= Alan Thompson =

Alan Thompson or Allan Thompson may refer to:

- Alan Thompson (canoeist) (born 1959), New Zealand canoer, double gold medallist at the 1984 Summer Olympics
- Alan Thompson (footballer, born 1952), English footballer, played for Sheffield Wednesday and Stockport County
- Alan Thompson (footballer, born 1973), English footballer, played mainly for Bolton Wanderers and Celtic
- Alan Thompson (rugby league, born 1953), Australian rugby league footballer
- Alan Thompson (rugby league, born 1922) (1922–2008), Australian rugby league footballer
- Alan Thompson (swimming coach) (active since 1999), Australian swimming coach
- Alan Thompson (British politician) (1924–2017), British Labour MP for Dunfermline
- Alan Thompson (Washington politician) (1927–2019), American politician in the state of Washington
- Alan Thompson (broadcaster) (1963–2017), Welsh radio broadcaster
- Alan S. Thompson (born 1954), vice admiral in the United States Navy
- Alan Thompson (Australian footballer) (born 1951), Australian rules footballer for Fitzroy
- Allan Thompson (footballer) (1910–1984), Australian rules footballer for Fitzroy
- Allan Thompson (comics), fictional character from The Adventures of Tintin by Hergé
- Alan Thompson (American football) (born 1949), American football running back in the Canadian Football League
- Alan Thompson (neurologist), Irish physician

== See also ==
- Ed Thompson (Wisconsin politician) (1944–2011), birth name Allan Thompson, American politician from Wisconsin
- Allen Thompson (disambiguation)
- Al Thompson (disambiguation)
- Alan Thomson (disambiguation)
