= Catherine Emmanuelle =

American politician

Member of the Eau Claire City Council At-Large
- Incumbent
- Assumed office September 24, 2012
- Preceded by: Dana Wachs

Personal details
- Born: January 14, 1980 (age 46) Oakland, California
- Party: Democratic
- Spouse: David Jones
- Children: Siena, Nico, and Reya
- Education: University of Wisconsin–Eau Claire (B.A.); University of Minnesota Duluth (M.A.P.L.)

Catherine Nicole Emmanuelle (born January 14, 1980) is an At-Large Member of the Eau Claire City Council. She is a Democrat.

== Life and career ==
Emmanuelle was born in Oakland, California, and grew up in the Bay Area. Catherine started working in the fifth grade, at her first job as a paper delivery girl. She went on to work as a server in a restaurant, and an employee at Blue Cross and Blue Shield. She was one of two Californian representatives on a nationwide research project. After visiting all 50 states and surveying 13,000 teenagers for a nonprofit organization, Emmanuelle decided to move to Eau Claire in 2000. Emmanuelle became a displaced homemaker and single mother in 2007. During her time as a nontraditional student at the University of Wisconsin-Eau Claire, Emmanuelle worked as an Intern for U.S. Senator Herb Kohl. Emmanuelle also worked on the re-election campaign of Kathleen Vinehout.

In September 2012, Emmanuelle was appointed to the Eau Claire City Council to fill the seat left vacant by new State Representative Dana Wachs. In 2013, she was elected to the seat. Notably, she is the first Latina elected in the community's history.

In addition to serving on the City Council, Emmanuelle serves on the board of directors for Visit Eau Claire, and on the City of Eau Claire appointments committee, economic policy advisory committee, and affirmative action committee. Catherine works for The University of Wisconsin-Extension as the first Area Extension Director for Chippewa, Dunn, and Eau Claire Counties. She serves with colleagues to bring the Wisconsin Idea alive through transformational education in the tri-county area. Before this role, she was a family living educator for the University of Wisconsin-Extension in Trempealeau County, Wisconsin, where she partnered with organizations and people to build family resilience through complex social issues, alternatives to incarceration, treatment and diversion courts, immigrant families, and community leadership development.

Catherine was the recipient of the 2013 University of Wisconsin Outstanding Women of Color in Education award. In 2014, Emmanuelle was a featured panelist for "Conversation: A Nation Reimagined: A New Way Forward" sponsored by The Shriver Report and The Atlantic. In 2017, Emmanuelle received the Outstanding Recent Alumnus Award from the University of Wisconsin.

== Breastfeeding ban ==
In 2017, Emmanuelle received national attention when her city council voted 7-1 to ban her from breastfeeding her 11-month old son during council meetings. This resulted in a groundswell of grassroots support, with social media hashtags including #StandwithCatherine, #LactateandLegislate, and #LetMomsLead all trending on Twitter.

Catherine was publicly supported in a CNN Op-Ed and in the Huffington Post. Coverage of Emmanuelle and the ban was featured in People Magazine, Yahoo, Bustle, Chicago Tribune, The New York Times, Glamour, and The Washington Post.

The Today Show ran a story about Emmanuelle, where she stated "It's a human right to be a parent and it's a human right to be able to feed your child,". Emerge Wisconsin and Moms Rising sent petitions with some 15,000 signatures in support of Emmanuelle to the City Council. The New York City Council, New York Women's Caucus, and women of the Wisconsin Legislature all penned open letters supporting Councilmember Emmanuelle.

== Publications ==
- Catherine Emmanuelle (2014-03-11). To the Brink and Back. Included in The Shriver Report: A Woman's Nation Pushes Back from the Brink. Macmillan Publishers. ISBN 978-1-137-27974-3.
- Catherine Emmanuelle (2011-04-05). The Awakening of Mamie Till-Mobley. Smithsonian Institution's National Museum of African American History and Culture.
