= Allan Thomson =

Allan Thomson may refer to:

- Allan Thomson (rugby league) (1943–2006), Australian rugby league footballer
- Allan Thomson (businessman) (1788–1884), banker, railroad executive, and city councilman of Wilmington, Delaware
- Allan Thomson (geologist) (1881–1928), New Zealand geologist, scientific administrator and museum director

== See also ==
- Allen Thomson, Scottish physician
- Alan Thomson (disambiguation)
- Alan Thompson (disambiguation)
