= 2018 Wisconsin gubernatorial election =

- November 6, 2018
- Turnout: 61.2% (▲6.7%)
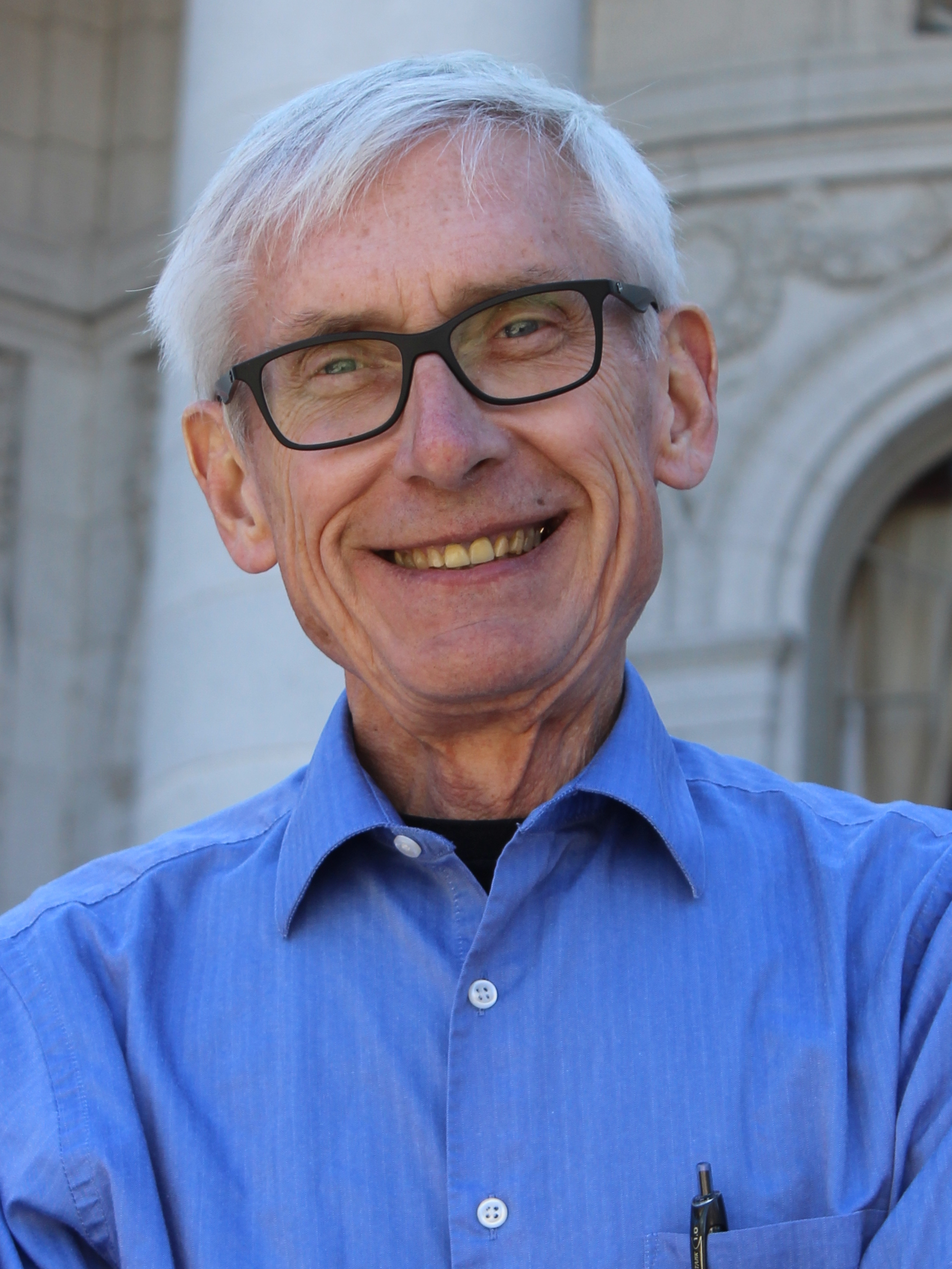

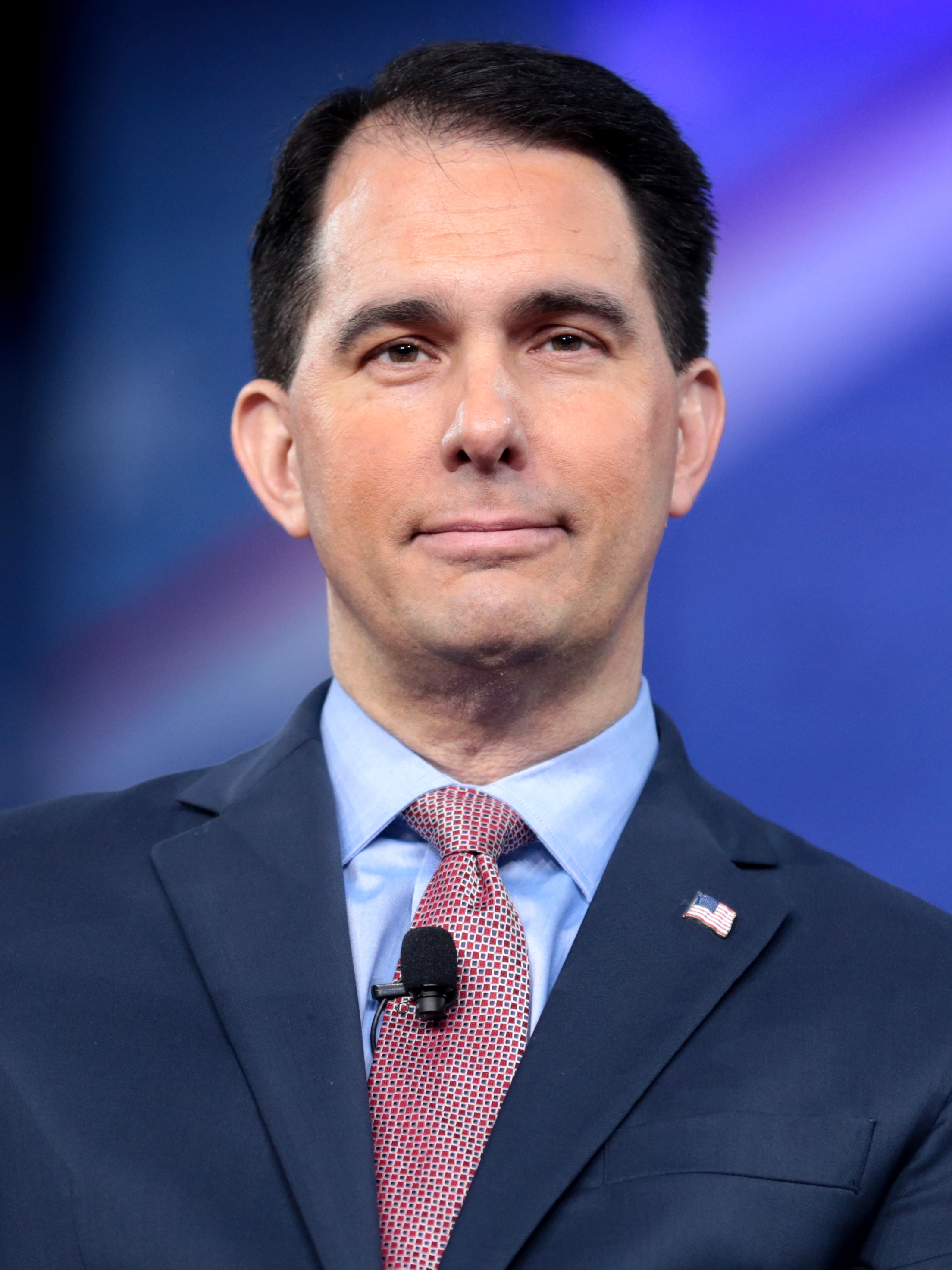
Nominee	Tony Evers	Scott Walker
Party	Democratic	Republican
Running mate	Mandela Barnes	Rebecca Kleefisch
Popular vote	1,324,307	1,295,080
Percentage	49.54%	48.44%
- Evers: 30–40% 40–50% 50–60% 60–70% 70–80% 80–90% >90% Walker: 20–30% 40–50% 50–60% 60–70% 70–80% 80–90% >90% Tie: 40–50% 50% No data
Governor before election
Scott Walker
Republican
Elected Governor
Tony Evers
Democratic

The 2018 Wisconsin gubernatorial election took place on November 6, 2018. It occurred concurrently with a Senate election in the state, elections to the state's U.S. House seats, and various other elections. Incumbent Republican Governor Scott Walker sought a third term, and was challenged by Democratic candidate and then-Superintendent of Public Instruction Tony Evers, as well as Libertarian Phil Anderson and independent Maggie Turnbull. Evers, along with his running mate Mandela Barnes, managed to defeat Walker and Lieutenant Governor Rebecca Kleefisch in a closely fought and widely watched race, ending the state's Republican trifecta.

The result was considered "too close to call" on election night, with Walker and Evers being separated by a mere few hundred votes for much of the night as counties reported their results. Shortly after midnight on November 7, Milwaukee County reported around 46,000 uncounted absentee ballots. From those ballots, Evers received 38,674 votes, or 84% of the total, and Walker 7,181, giving Evers a narrow lead. The race was called for him shortly after. As of 2026, this is the only Wisconsin gubernatorial election since 2002 where the incumbent was defeated.

Wisconsin was the only state in the 2018 gubernatorial election cycle to elect a Democratic governor while voting more Republican than the national average. (Note: Democrats won the popular vote in Wisconsin by 1.1 points, and won it 3.1 points nationally.) With a margin of 1.1%, this election was also the second-closest race of the 2018 gubernatorial election cycle, behind only the election in Florida. Walker was one of two incumbent governors to be defeated for re-election in 2018, the other being Republican Bruce Rauner in neighboring Illinois, who had lost decisively to J. B. Pritzker.

As previously mentioned, the deep purple state of Wisconsin hosted among the most competitive contests for governor in the nation, with Evers edging out Walker by just around 1.1%. He received 49.5% of the statewide vote to Walker's 48.4%, making it the closest gubernatorial election in the state since 1964. It also marked the first time a Democrat won the state's governor's office since Jim Doyle was re-elected in 2006. Despite a relatively small shift from the 2016 presidential election, in which Donald Trump narrowly flipped the state, to this one, Evers carried seven counties that were won by Trump two years prior: Columbia, Crawford, Grant, Kenosha, Richland, Sauk, and Vernon.

In comparison to the last gubernatorial race (2014), both candidates improved their parties' vote totals; Walker received around 35,000 more votes than he did in 2014, while Evers received over 200,000 more votes than that of Mary Burke, the Democratic nominee in the last election who ultimately lost to Walker by around 5.7%. Evers' 2018 victory margin was significantly lower than that of Democrat Tammy Baldwin in the concurrent Senate election, in which she was re-elected by a double-digit margin in an impressive display of ticket-splitting.

Evers' victory came amidst key Democratic victories in all other statewide races held concurrently, including pickups in the state's attorney general (Josh Kaul) and state treasurer (Sarah Godlewski) races, and a solid re-election for Democrat Doug La Follette as secretary of state.

At the age of 67, Evers became the oldest elected governor of Wisconsin.

== Republican primary ==
=== Governor ===
==== Candidates ====
- Robert Meyer, businessman and candidate for mayor of Sun Prairie in 2007
- Scott Walker, incumbent governor

==== Endorsements ====
Scott Walker

Federal officials

- Mike Pence, vice president of the United States
- Donald Trump, president of the United States

Statewide officials

- Tommy Thompson, former governor of Wisconsin

Organizations

- Associated Builders and Contractors
- National Federation of Independent Business

==== Results ====
Republican gubernatorial primary results
Party	Candidate	Votes	%
Republican	Scott Walker (incumbent)	417,276	91.54%
Republican	Robert Meyer	38,269	8.40%
Republican	Ryan Carson (write-in)	11	0.00%
Republican	Adams Nicholas Paul (write-in)	7	0.00%
Write-in		267	0.06%
Total votes		455,830	100.00%

=== Lieutenant governor ===
==== Candidates ====
- Rebecca Kleefisch, incumbent lieutenant governor

==== Results ====
Republican lieutenant gubernatorial primary results
Party	Candidate	Votes	%
Republican	Rebecca Kleefisch (incumbent)	407,420	99.73%
Write-in		1,092	0.27%
Total votes		408,512	100.00%

== Democratic primary ==
=== Governor ===
==== Nominee ====
- Tony Evers, superintendent of public instruction of Wisconsin (2009–2019)

==== Eliminated in primary ====
- Matt Flynn, former chair of the Democratic Party of Wisconsin, retired partner at Quarles & Brady and candidate for U.S. Senate in 1986
- Mike McCabe, former executive director of Wisconsin Democracy Campaign and candidate for the State Assembly in 1998
- Mahlon Mitchell, president of the Professional Fire Fighters of Wisconsin and nominee for lieutenant governor in 2012
- Josh Pade, lawyer
- Kelda Helen Roys, former state representative and candidate for WI-02 in 2012
- Paul Soglin, mayor of Madison and nominee for WI-02 in 1996
- Kathleen Vinehout, state senator and candidate for governor in 2012

==== Withdrew ====
- Mike Crute, liberal talk radio broadcaster (endorsed McCabe)
- Michele Doolan, businesswoman (endorsed Flynn)
- Andy Gronik, businessman (remained on ballot; endorsed Roys)
- Bob Harlow, candidate for CA-18 in 2016 (endorsed Flynn)
- Kurt Kober, businessman (ran for lieutenant governor)
- Jeff Rumbaugh, disability rights activist (endorsed McCabe)
- Dana Wachs, state representative (remained on ballot; endorsed Evers)

==== Declined ====
- Chris Abele, Milwaukee County executive
- Mark Bakken, businessman
- Peter Barca, state representative and former U.S. representative
- Tom Barrett, mayor of Milwaukee, former U.S. representative, nominee for governor in 2010 and 2012, and candidate in 2002
- John T. Chisholm, Milwaukee County district attorney (endorsed Flynn)
- Kevin Conroy, president and CEO of Exact Sciences
- Timothy Cullen, former state senator
- Katherine Gehl, former president and CEO of Gehl Foods
- Gordon Hintz, minority leader of the State Assembly
- Brett Hulsey, former state representative and candidate for governor in 2014
- Ron Kind, U.S. representative
- James Kreuser, Kenosha County executive
- Joe Parisi, Dane County executive
- Mark Pocan, U.S. representative
- Jennifer Shilling, Democratic leader of the State Senate

==== Endorsements ====
Tony Evers

U.S. senators

- Russ Feingold, Wisconsin (former)
- Herb Kohl, Wisconsin (former)

U.S. representatives

- Steve Kagen, Wisconsin's 8th congressional district (former)
- Dave Obey, Wisconsin's 7th congressional district (former)

State officials

- Barbara Lawton, former lieutenant governor of Wisconsin

State legislators

- Spencer Black, former state representative
- Fred Clark, former state representative
- John Lehman, former state senator
- Mark Miller, state senator
- Sondy Pope, state representative
- Calvin Potter, former state senator
- Bob Turner, former state representative
- Dana Wachs, state representative
- Mandy Wright, former state representative

Municipal elected officials

- Susan J. M. Bauman, former mayor of Madison
- Joel Skornicka, former mayor of Madison

Labor unions

- Wisconsin Postal Workers Union
Matt Flynn

State elected officials

- Tony Earl, former governor of Wisconsin

County elected officials

- John T. Chisholm, district attorney of Milwaukee County
- John La Fave, register of deeds of Milwaukee County and former state representative

Individuals

- Ernesto Chacon, president of the Federation for Civic Action
- James Santelle, former United States attorney for the Eastern District of Wisconsin
- Edward J. Zore, chairman of Northwestern Mutual
Mike McCabe

Individuals

- Tim Canova, candidate for Florida's 23rd congressional district (Independent)
Mahlon Mitchell

U.S. senators

- Kamala Harris, U.S. senator from California

U.S. representatives

- Gwen Moore, U.S. representative from Wisconsin's 4th congressional district

Labor unions

- AFSCME Council 32
- Amalgamated Transit Union Local 998
- International Union of Operating Engineers Local 139
- Service Employees International Union Wisconsin State Council
- Wisconsin State AFL–CIO
Kelda Roys

U.S. senators

- Kirsten Gillibrand, U.S. senator

National organizations

- #VoteProChoice
- EMILY's List
- Feminist Majority
- NARAL Pro-Choice America
- National Organization for Women
- Women's March Wisconsin

State legislators

- Jessica King, state senator (former)
- Nick Milroy, state representative
- Christine Sinicki, state representative
- Amanda Stuck, state representative
- Lisa Subeck, state representative
- JoCasta Zamarripa, state representative

Individuals

- Bon Iver, indie folk band
- Andy Gronik, businessman
- Chelsea Handler, actor and comedian
- Jane Lynch, actor and comedian
- Sarah Silverman, actor and comedian
- Bradley Whitford, actor, best known from The West Wing
Dana Wachs (withdrew)

U.S. representatives

- Dave Obey, 7th congressional district (former)

State legislators

- Jill Billings, state representative
- Jonathan Brostoff, state representative
- Dave Considine, state representative
- Steve Doyle, state representative
- Dianne Hesselbein, state representative
- LaTonya Johnson, state senator
- Nick Milroy, state representative
- Tod Ohnstad, state representative
- Christine Sinicki, state representative
- Mark Spreitzer, state representative
- Lisa Subeck, state representative

==== Polling ====
Poll source	Date(s) administered	Sample size	Margin of error	Tony Evers	Matt Flynn	Andy Gronik*	Mike McCabe	Mahlon Mitchell	Josh Pade	Kelda Roys	Paul Soglin	Kathleen Vinehout	Dana Wachs*	Other	Undecided
Emerson College	July 26–28, 2018	282	± 6.3%	30%	5%	–	5%	5%	–	7%	5%	10%	–	–	33%
Marist College	July 15–19, 2018	466	± 5.3%	25%	3%	2%	7%	3%	1%	3%	6%	7%	2%	<1%	41%
Marquette University	July 11–15, 2018	305	± 6.6%	31%	5%	–	3%	6%	0%	3%	4%	6%	–	0%	38%
Marquette University	June 13–17, 2018	278	± 6.4%	25%	7%	4%	7%	4%	1%	2%	7%	5%	2%	1%	34%
FM3 Research (D) (Note: Poll sponsored by Soglin's campaign.)	March 16–19, 2018	601	± 4.0%	30%	6%	2%	4%	6%	–	3%	17%	12%	3%	–	16%
Marquette University	February 25 – March 1, 2018	318	± 7.1%	18%	7%	3%	6%	4%	–	0%	9%	5%	4%	1%	44%
Public Policy Polling (D) (Note: Poll sponsored by Evers' campaign.)	January 8–10, 2018	747	± 3.6%	29%	5%	2%	5%	5%	–	2%	10%	11%	4%	–	28%

An asterisk (*) denotes that a candidate withdrew before the primary but remained on the ballot.

==== Results ====
Results by county: Evers—50–60% Evers—40–50% Evers—30–40% Mitchell—30–40% Vinehout—30–40% Vinehout—40–50% Vinehout—50–60%

Democratic gubernatorial primary results
Party	Candidate	Votes	%
Democratic	Tony Evers	225,082	41.77%
Democratic	Mahlon Mitchell	87,926	16.32%
Democratic	Kelda Helen Roys	69,086	12.82%
Democratic	Kathleen Vinehout	44,168	8.20%
Democratic	Mike McCabe	39,885	7.40%
Democratic	Matt Flynn	31,580	5.86%
Democratic	Paul Soglin	28,158	5.23%
Democratic	Andy Gronik (withdrawn)	6,627	1.23%
Democratic	Dana Wachs (withdrawn)	4,216	0.78%
Democratic	Josh Pade	1,908	0.35%
Write-in		221	0.11%
Total votes		538,857	100.00%

=== Lieutenant governor ===
Mandela Barnes, a former state representative from Milwaukee, defeated opponent Kurt Kober by a 2 to 1 margin for the nomination, becoming the first African American to be nominated by a major party for a Wisconsin gubernatorial ticket. (Note: Mahlon Mitchell was nominated by the Democrats for lieutenant governor in the 2012 Wisconsin lieutenant gubernatorial recall election, however that was held as a separate election for lieutenant governor)

==== Candidate ====
===== Nominee =====
- Mandela Barnes, former state representative, and candidate for state senate in 2016

===== Eliminated in primary =====
- Kurt J. Kober, businessman

==== Results ====
Results by county: Barnes—70–80% Barnes—60–70% Barnes—50–60% Kober—60–70%

Democratic lieutenant gubernatorial primary results
Party	Candidate	Votes	%
Democratic	Mandela Barnes	326,855	67.86%
Democratic	Kurt J. Kober	153,994	31.97%
Democratic	Corban Gehler (write-in)	12	0.00%
Democratic	William Henry Davis III (write-in)	8	0.00%
Democratic	Scattering	775	0.16%
Total votes		481,644	100.00%

== Libertarian primary ==
=== Governor ===
==== Nominee ====
- Phil Anderson, chairman of the Wisconsin Libertarian Party and Libertarian nominee for the U.S. Senate in 2016

==== Endorsements ====
Phil Anderson

State officials

- William Weld, former governor of Massachusetts (1991–1997)

==== Results ====
Libertarian gubernatorial primary results
Party	Candidate	Votes	%
Libertarian	Philip Anderson	1,673	98.35%
Write-in		28	1.65%
Total votes		1,701	100.00%

=== Lieutenant governor ===
==== Nominee ====
- Patrick Baird, U.S. Navy veteran

==== Results ====
Libertarian lieutenant gubernatorial primary results
Party	Candidate	Votes	%
Libertarian	Patrick Baird	1,636	98.85%
Write-in		19	1.15%
Total votes		1,655	100.00%

== Green primary ==
=== Governor ===
==== Nominee ====
- Michael White

==== Withdrew ====
- Nick De Leon, pastor (endorsed Democrat Matt Flynn)

==== Results ====
Green gubernatorial primary results
Party	Candidate	Votes	%
Green	Michael J. White	817	95.78%
Write-in		36	4.22%
Total votes		853	100.00%

=== Lieutenant governor ===
==== Nominee ====
- Tiffany Anderson

==== Results ====
Green primary results
Party	Candidate	Votes	%
Green	Tiffany Anderson	793	98.02%
Write-in		16	1.98%
Total votes		809	100.00%

== Independent candidates ==
=== Governor ===
- Maggie Turnbull, astrobiologist

=== Lieutenant governor ===
- Wil Losch, Turnbull's running mate

== General election ==
Despite the fact that Scott Walker had won three prior races for governor in 2010, 2012, and 2014 by fairly comfortable margins, his bid for a third term was complicated by rising unpopularity due to his policies concerning public education and infrastructure. Walker also faced backlash for a deal his administration made with Taiwanese company Foxconn in 2017 to create jobs in the state in exchange for around $4.5 billion in taxpayer subsidies. In 2018, the deal resulted in around $90 million of funding for roads being diverted to a stretch of I-94 that was set to be near a future Foxconn plant from the rest of state. The poor condition of many roads around the state as well as the lack of work being done to redo them prompted a campaign where potholes were being labeled as “Scott”-holes.

Walker's approval ratings were hobbled further by the unpopularity of Republican U.S. President Donald Trump in Wisconsin. Walker himself sounded the alarm on this several times in early 2018 after Democrats won two special elections to the Wisconsin State Senate in typically Republican districts and an election to the Wisconsin Supreme Court. In April 2018, Walker warned that Wisconsin was "at risk of a blue wave" in November. The Walker campaign generally focused on promoting the popular parts of his record, such as a freeze on tuition at public universities and record low unemployment.

The result was expected to be close, with a record $93 million spent on the race by the two major campaigns and special interest groups from in and out of the state. In the end, Walker was ultimately defeated by Democrat Tony Evers, who garnered a slightly more than 1% margin of victory, as Democrats swept every statewide race up for election.

=== Predictions ===
Source	Ranking	As of
The Cook Political Report	Tossup	October 26, 2018
The Washington Post	Tossup	November 5, 2018
FiveThirtyEight	Lean D (flip)	November 5, 2018
Rothenberg Political Report	Tossup	November 1, 2018
Sabato's Crystal Ball	Lean D (flip)	November 5, 2018
RealClearPolitics	Tossup	November 4, 2018
Daily Kos	Tossup	November 5, 2018
Fox News (Note: The Fox News Midterm Power Rankings uniquely does not contain a category for Safe/Solid races)	Lean D (flip)	November 5, 2018
Politico	Tossup	November 5, 2018
Governing	Tossup	November 5, 2018

=== Polling ===
View source data.

Poll source	Date(s) administered	Sample size	Margin of error	Scott Walker (R)	Tony Evers (D)	Phil Anderson (L)	Other	Undecided
Research Co.	November 1–3, 2018	450	± 4.6%	44%	45%	–	3%	9%
Emerson College	October 29–31, 2018	604	± 4.1%	46%	51%	–	2%	1%
Marquette University	October 24–28, 2018	1,154 LV	± 3.2%	47%	47%	3%	–	0%
Marquette University	October 24–28, 2018	1,400 RV	± 3.0%	47%	44%	5%	–	2%
Ipsos	October 12–18, 2018	1,193	± 3.0%	45%	48%	–	2%	5%
Marquette University	October 3–7, 2018	799 LV	± 3.9%	47%	46%	5%	–	1%
Marquette University	October 3–7, 2018	1,000 RV	± 3.6%	47%	43%	7%	–	2%
Marist College	September 30 – October 3, 2018	571 LV	± 4.8%	42%	50%	3%	2%	3%
Marist College	September 30 – October 3, 2018	571 LV	± 4.8%	43%	53%	–	1%	3%
Marist College	September 30 – October 3, 2018	781 RV	± 4.1%	42%	49%	3%	3%	4%
Marist College	September 30 – October 3, 2018	781 RV	± 4.1%	43%	52%	–	1%	3%
Ipsos	September 14–24, 2018	1,109	± 3.0%	43%	50%	–	3%	4%
Marquette University	September 12–16, 2018	614 LV	± 4.4%	44%	49%	6%	–	1%
Marquette University	September 12–16, 2018	800 RV	± 4.0%	43%	47%	7%	–	2%
Public Policy Polling (D) (Note: Poll sponsored by High Ground Action Fund, an independent expediture group supporting Democratic candidates.)	September 4–5, 2018	726	± 4.0%	45%	49%	–	–	6%
Suffolk University	August 18–24, 2018	500	± 4.4%	44%	46%	2%	1%	7%
Marquette University	August 15–19, 2018	601 LV	± 4.5%	46%	46%	6%	–	2%
Marquette University	August 15–19, 2018	800 RV	± 4.0%	46%	44%	7%	–	3%
Public Policy Polling (D)	August 15–16, 2018	596	± 4.0%	44%	49%	–	–	7%
Emerson College	July 26–28, 2018	632	± 4.2%	41%	48%	–	5%	7%
Marist College	July 15–19, 2018	906	± 3.8%	41%	54%	–	<1%	5%
Marquette University	June 13–17, 2018	800	± 4.0%	48%	44%	–	–	5%
Public Policy Polling (D)	May 9–10, 2018	644	± 3.9%	45%	49%	–	–	6%

Hypothetical polling

with Kelda Roys

Poll source	Date(s) administered	Sample size	Margin of error	Scott Walker (R)	Kelda Roys (D)	Undecided
Marquette University	June 13–17, 2018	800	± 4.0%	48%	40%	7%

with Matt Flynn

Poll source	Date(s) administered	Sample size	Margin of error	Scott Walker (R)	Matt Flynn (D)	Undecided
Marquette University	June 13–17, 2018	400	± 5.6%	46%	42%	10%

with Mike McCabe

Poll source	Date(s) administered	Sample size	Margin of error	Scott Walker (R)	Mike McCabe (D)	Undecided
Marquette University	June 13–17, 2018	400	± 5.6%	44%	42%	9%

with Mahlon Mitchell

Poll source	Date(s) administered	Sample size	Margin of error	Scott Walker (R)	Mahlon Mitchell (D)	Undecided
Marquette University	June 13–17, 2018	400	± 5.6%	45%	41%	11%

with Josh Pade

Poll source	Date(s) administered	Sample size	Margin of error	Scott Walker (R)	Josh Pade (D)	Undecided
Marquette University	June 13–17, 2018	400	± 5.6%	49%	36%	11%

with Paul Soglin

Poll source	Date(s) administered	Sample size	Margin of error	Scott Walker (R)	Paul Soglin (D)	Undecided
Marquette University	June 13–17, 2018	400	± 5.6%	48%	39%	8%

with Kathleen Vinehout

Poll source	Date(s) administered	Sample size	Margin of error	Scott Walker (R)	Kathleen Vinehout (D)	Undecided
Marquette University	June 13–17, 2018	400	± 5.6%	48%	39%	9%

Poll source	Date(s) administered	Sample size	Margin of error	Scott Walker (R)	Generic Democrat	Undecided
Public Policy Polling (D)	October 17–18, 2017	1,116	± 2.9%	43%	48%	8%

with Andy Gronik

Poll source	Date(s) administered	Sample size	Margin of error	Scott Walker (R)	Andy Gronik (D)	Undecided
Marquette University	June 13–17, 2018	400	± 5.6%	46%	41%	11%

with Dana Wachs

Poll source	Date(s) administered	Sample size	Margin of error	Scott Walker (R)	Dana Wachs (D)	Undecided
Marquette University	June 13–17, 2018	400	± 5.6%	49%	38%	9%

=== Debate ===
2018 Wisconsin gubernatorial election debate
No.	Date	Host	Moderator	Link	Republican	Democratic
Key: P Participant A Absent N Not invited I Invited W Withdrawn						
Key: P Participant A Absent N Not invited I Invited W Withdrawn					Scott Walker	Tony Evers
1	Oct. 26, 2018	University of Wisconsin-Milwaukee; WTMJ-TV; WUWM	Charles Benson; Shannon Sims; Mitch Teich	YouTube	P	P

=== Results ===
Evers won the election by a 1.09% margin.

2018 Wisconsin gubernatorial election
Party	Candidate	Votes	%	±%
Democratic	Tony Evers; Mandela Barnes	1,324,307	49.54%	+2.95%
Republican	Scott Walker (incumbent); Rebecca Kleefisch (incumbent)	1,295,080	48.44%	−3.82%
Libertarian	Phil Anderson; Patrick Baird	20,225	0.76%	
Independent	Margaret Turnbull; Wil Losch	18,884	0.71%	
Green	Michael J. White; Tiffany Anderson	11,087	0.41%	
Independent	Arnie Enz	2,745	0.10%	
Write-in		980	0.04%	
Majority		29,227	1.09%	
Total votes		2,673,308	100.00%	
Democratic gain from Republican		Swing	+6.77%	

==== By county ====
County	Tony Evers Democratic		Scott Walker Republican		All Others Various		Margin		Total votes cast
County	#	%	#	%	#	%	#	%	Total votes cast
Adams	3,892	41.89%	5,209	56.07%	190	2.04%	-1,317	-14.18%	9,291
Ashland	4,168	60.23%	2,584	37.34%	168	2.43%	1,584	22.89%	6,920
Barron	7,623	41.05%	10,655	57.38%	290	1.56%	-3,032	-16.33%	18,568
Bayfield	5,152	58.57%	3,458	39.31%	187	2.13%	1,694	19.26%	8,797
Brown	51,724	44.72%	61,424	53.10%	2,521	2.18%	-9,700	-8.39%	115,669
Buffalo	2,385	39.91%	3,463	57.95%	128	2.14%	-1,078	-18.04%	5,976
Burnett	2,742	36.14%	4,664	61.47%	182	2.40%	-1,922	-25.33%	7,588
Calumet	8,992	37.94%	14,313	60.38%	398	1.68%	-5,321	-22.45%	23,703
Chippewa	11,739	42.26%	15,499	55.80%	537	1.93%	-3,760	-13.54%	27,775
Clark	4,015	34.28%	7,469	63.76%	230	1.96%	-3,454	-29.49%	11,714
Columbia	14,124	52.25%	12,363	45.73%	547	2.02%	1,761	6.51%	27,034
Crawford	3,354	50.79%	3,117	47.20%	133	2.01%	237	3.59%	6,604
Dane	220,052	74.69%	69,206	23.49%	,5365	1.82%	150,846	51.20%	294,623
Dodge	13,552	35.84%	23,516	62.20%	742	1.96%	-9,964	-26.35%	37,810
Door	8,151	48.01%	8,536	50.27%	292	1.72%	-385	-2.27%	16,979
Douglas	11,034	58.82%	7,251	38.65%	474	2.53%	3,783	20.17%	18,759
Dunn	8,667	46.96%	9,255	50.14%	535	2.90%	-588	-3.19%	18,457
Eau Claire	26,768	54.82%	20,855	42.71%	1,210	2.48%	5,913	12.11%	48,833
Florence	643	29.48%	1,503	68.91%	35	1.60%	-860	-39.43%	2,181
Fond du Lac	16,439	36.38%	27,941	61.84%	806	1.78%	-11,502	-25.45%	45,186
Forest	1,486	37.32%	2,421	60.80%	75	1.88%	-935	-23.48%	3,982
Grant	9,665	49.32%	9,502	48.49%	430	2.19%	163	0.83%	19,597
Green	9,378	54.87%	7,333	42.91%	379	2.22%	2,045	11.97%	17,090
Green Lake	2,633	32.17%	5,411	66.12%	140	1.71%	-2,778	-33.94%	8,184
Iowa	6,674	59.72%	4,289	38.38%	213	1.91%	2,385	21.34%	11,176
Iron	1,264	40.88%	1,785	57.73%	43	1.39%	-521	-16.85%	3,092
Jackson	3,713	46.32%	4,129	51.51%	174	2.17%	-416	-5.19%	8,016
Jefferson	16,018	41.98%	21,475	56.28%	664	1.74%	-5,457	-14.30%	38,157
Juneau	4,247	41.92%	5,689	56.15%	195	1.92%	-1,442	-14.23%	10,131
Kenosha	34,481	50.65%	31,512	46.29%	2,081	3.06%	2,969	4.36%	68,074
Kewaunee	3,572	37.60%	5,792	60.97%	135	1.42%	-2,220	-23.37%	9,499
La Crosse	32,103	56.24%	23,537	41.23%	1,441	2.52%	8,566	15.01%	57,081
Lafayette	3,135	47.76%	3,324	50.64%	105	1.60%	-189	-2.88%	6,564
Langlade	2,825	30.49%	5,712	61.65%	728	7.86%	-2,887	-31.16%	9,265
Lincoln	5,335	39.49%	7,865	58.22%	310	2.29%	-2,530	-18.73%	13,510
Manitowoc	13,513	38.00%	21,360	60.07%	683	1.92%	-7,847	-22.07%	35,556
Marathon	24,057	38.71%	36,886	59.36%	1,201	1.93%	-12,829	-20.64%	62,144
Marinette	6,193	35.58%	10,916	62.72%	296	1.70%	-4,723	-27.14%	17,405
Marquette	2,911	40.46%	4,143	57.58%	141	1.96%	-1,232	-17.12%	7,195
Menominee	866	76.50%	233	20.58%	33	2.92%	633	55.92%	1,132
Milwaukee	262,124	66.55%	124,055	31.50%	7,698	1.95%	138,069	35.05%	393,877
Monroe	6,969	41.48%	9,464	56.34%	366	2.18%	-2,495	-14.85%	16,799
Oconto	5,858	33.30%	11,490	65.32%	243	1.38%	-5,632	-32.02%	17,591
Oneida	7,850	40.05%	11,248	57.39%	502	2.56%	-3,398	-17.34%	19,600
Outagamie	36,290	43.51%	45,359	54.38%	1,765	2.12%	-9,069	-10.87%	83,414
Ozaukee	18,394	35.94%	32,069	62.66%	713	1.39%	-13,675	-26.72%	51,176
Pepin	1,333	42.52%	1,745	55.66%	57	1.82%	-412	-13.14%	3,135
Pierce	8,193	46.81%	8,740	49.94%	568	3.25%	-547	-3.13%	17,501
Polk	7,333	39.42%	10,866	58.41%	404	2.17%	-3,533	-18.99%	18,603
Portage	18,007	51.64%	15,958	45.76%	906	2.60%	2,049	5.88%	34,871
Price	2,585	38.70%	3,996	59.83%	98	1.47%	-1,411	-21.13%	6,679
Racine	40,498	46.45%	44,770	51.35%	1,922	2.20%	-4,272	-4.90%	87,190
Richland	3,623	51.37%	3,285	46.58%	145	2.06%	338	4.79%	7,053
Rock	39,680	58.04%	26,904	39.35%	1,782	2.61%	12,776	18.69%	68,366
Rusk	2,184	35.81%	3,797	62.26%	118	1.93%	-1,613	-26.45%	6,099
Sauk	15,630	54.02%	12,615	43.60%	687	2.37%	3,015	10.42%	28,932
Sawyer	3,484	42.50%	4,542	55.41%	171	2.09%	-1,058	-12.91%	8,197
Shawano	6,121	34.01%	11,478	63.77%	401	2.23%	-5,357	-29.76%	18,000
Sheboygan	20,801	39.07%	31,520	59.20%	926	1.74%	-10,719	-20.13%	53,247
St. Croix	16,690	41.65%	22,108	55.17%	1,272	3.17%	-5,418	-13.52%	40,070
Taylor	2,269	28.05%	5,690	70.35%	129	1.59%	-3,421	-42.30%	8,088
Trempealeau	5,393	44.01%	6,623	54.04%	239	1.95%	-1,230	-10.04%	12,255
Vernon	6,550	50.13%	6,276	48.03%	240	1.84%	274	2.10%	13,066
Vilas	4,510	36.03%	7,814	62.42%	195	1.56%	-3,304	-26.39%	12,519
Walworth	17,394	38.26%	27,088	59.59%	977	2.15%	-9,694	-21.32%	45,459
Washburn	3,292	41.59%	4,461	56.35%	163	2.06%	-1,169	-14.77%	7,916
Washington	18,703	26.51%	50,958	72.23%	884	1.25%	-32,255	-45.72%	70,545
Waukesha	72,131	32.52%	146,699	66.14%	2,977	1.34%	-74,568	-33.62%	221,807
Waupaca	8,143	36.23%	13,909	61.89%	421	1.87%	-5,766	-25.66%	22,473
Waushara	3,742	35.21%	6,719	63.21%	168	1.58%	-2,977	-28.01%	10,629
Winnebago	35,610	47.01%	38,368	50.65%	1,775	2.34%	-2,758	-3.64%	75,753
Wood	13,638	41.23%	18,871	57.04%	572	1.73%	-5,233	-15.82%	33,081
Total	1,324,307	49.54%	1,295,080	48.44%	53,921	2.02%	29,227	1.09%	2,673,308

Counties that flipped from Republican to Democratic

- Grant (largest city: Platteville)
- Kenosha (largest city: Kenosha)
- Richland (largest city: Richland Center)

==== By congressional district ====
Despite losing the state, Walker won five of eight congressional districts.

District	Walker	Evers	Representative
1st	54%	44%	Paul Ryan
2nd	28%	70%	Mark Pocan
3rd	48%	50%	Ron Kind
4th	24%	74%	Gwen Moore
5th	61%	37%	Jim Sensenbrenner
6th	57%	41%	Glenn Grothman
7th	57%	41%	Sean Duffy
8th	56%	42%	Mike Gallagher

== Aftermath ==
Despite the close result, Scott Walker was unable to request a recount due to a law he had signed himself two years prior, which requires the margin of difference to be within 1%.

=== Lame duck legislative session ===
Early in December 2018, a special legislative session was called by Walker to pass a series of bills to limit the powers of Governor-elect Evers, as well as incoming Democratic Attorney General Josh Kaul, who had defeated incumbent Brad Schimel in the concurrent attorney general election.

Other bills being considered included restrictions on early voting and the passage of Medicaid work requirements, which Walker had previously held off on due to the election. A similar law restricting early voting that was passed several years prior had been ruled as unconstitutional.

The bills were widely denounced by Democrats and others as a "power grab." Representative Gwen Moore described the move as a "coup" that "hijacked the voters' will." Walker and other Republicans meanwhile argued that the bills were necessary ”checks on power” and that they did not actually strip any real powers from the executive. Lawsuits were filed by Evers and various labor unions almost immediately after Walker signed the bills into law.

== See also ==
- 2018 Wisconsin elections
- 2018 United States gubernatorial elections
- 2018 United States elections

== Notes ==
Partisan clients
