= Herbert Thompson =

Herbert Thompson may refer to:

- Herbert Hugh Thompson, security consultant
- Herbert Thompson (Egyptologist) (1859–1944), British Egyptologist
- Herbert Thompson (Leicestershire cricketer) (1886–1941)
- Herbert Thompson (Surrey cricketer) (1869–1947), English cricketer
- Herbert Thompson (sprinter), winner of the 60 yards at the 1943 USA Indoor Track and Field Championships
- Herbert J. Thompson (1881–1937), American Thoroughbred racehorse trainer
- Herbert Thompson (civil servant) (1898–1984), English civil servant
- Herbert Thompson Jr. (1933–2006), American prelate of the Episcopal Church

== See also ==
- Bert Thompson (disambiguation)
- Herbert Thomson
