= Oswell Borradaile =

English cricketer

Personal information
- Full name: Oswell Robert Borradaile
- Born: 9 May 1859; Westminster, London, England
- Died: 11 May 1935 (aged 76); Bexhill-on-Sea, Sussex, England
- Batting: Right-handed
- Bowling: Right-arm medium
- Relatives: Thomas Reay (cousin)

Domestic team information
- Years: Team
- 1894: Essex

Career statistics
Competition	First-class
Matches	1
Runs scored	7
Batting average	3.50
100s/50s	–/–
Top score	5
Catches/stumpings	1/–
- Source: Cricinfo, 3 March 2021

Oswell Robert Borradaile (9 May 1859 – 11 May 1935) was an English cricketer and a cricket administrator who was the secretary of Essex County Cricket Club for 31 years from 1890.

The son of The Reverend Abraham Borradaile, he was born at Westminster in May 1859. He was educated at Westminster School, where he was in Grant's House. A right-handed batsman and right-arm medium pace bowler, Borradaile had played minor matches for Essex from 1891. He made his sole appearance in first-class cricket for Essex against Surrey at Leyton in 1894: from the lower-middle order, he scored 2 runs in the first innings in which he batted before being dismissed by Tom Richardson, and 5 runs in the second in which he was dismissed leg before by Herbert Thompson, as Essex lost the match by an innings margin. While fielding, he took one catch, that of Bill Brockwell from the bowling of Walter Mead.

It was as a cricket administrator that Borradaile became better known. He was secretary of Essex from 1890 and steered the county club towards first-class status in 1894 and membership of the enlarged County Championship from 1895. He remained in post for 31 years, and was credited with saving the club from bankruptcy: Borradaile's predecessor, Morton Peto Betts, had saddled the club with big debts through the purchase of the County Ground at Leyton. The debt was finally removed in 1921, the year Borradaile resigned through ill-health, by the sale of the ground to the Army Sports Central Board. Borradaile was described by Wisden as "a man of strong personality, tremendous enthusiasm and energy". During the First World War, he played an active part in keeping the game alive by arranging for teams to play the Marylebone Cricket Club, whom Borradaile had played minor matches for from 1879 to 1910. He died at Bexhill-on-Sea in May 1935. His cousin was the cricketer and clergyman Thomas Reay.
