= Libertarian Party of Wisconsin =

State affiliate of the Libertarian Party

- Chairperson: Stephen Ecker
- Founded: 1973
- Headquarters: Greenfield, Wisconsin
- Ideology: Libertarianism
- National affiliation: Libertarian Party (United States)
- Colors: Gold-yellow
- Seats in the Senate: 0 / 33
- Seats in the Assembly: 0 / 99
- Seats in the U.S. Senate: 0 / 2
- Seats in the U.S. House of Representatives: 0 / 8
- Other elected officials: 1 (March 2026)

Website
- www.lpwi.org

The Libertarian Party of Wisconsin is the Wisconsin affiliate of the Libertarian Party. Founded in 1973, it is one of the oldest state affiliates in the Libertarian Party. In 2002, Ed Thompson, brother of Tommy Thompson and the Mayor of Tomah, Wisconsin, ran for Governor of Wisconsin, garnering over 10% of the vote. This was a record for a Libertarian gubernatorial candidate in Wisconsin running against both a Democratic and Republican candidate.

Wisconsin requires parties to poll at least 1% in a statewide election in order to be recognized for ballot status and to conduct party primaries. The Libertarian Party of Wisconsin met this test in 2014 with the candidacies of Madison attorney Tom Nelson for Attorney General (3%), Milwaukee political consultant Andy Craig for secretary of state (3%), and former Mayor Jerry Shidell of Rhinelander for state treasurer (2%).

In 2022, the sitting state chair of the Libertarian Party of Wisconsin, Jacob VandenPlas, ran for Congress (U.S. House of Representatives, WI District 8) and received 10.5% of the vote in a three-way race, a state of Wisconsin record. (the Democratic candidate was listed on the ballot as an Independent due to failing to meet ballot access paperwork requirements).

== Current office holders ==
- Mark Hepfinger -- Cottage Grove Municipal Court Judge
- Dennis Kenealy -- Erin Town Council Chairperson
- Dave Ripp -- Dane County Board of Supervisors, District 29
- Kevin Scheunnemann -- Kewaskum Village Board
- Brad Sponholz -- Greenfield Planning Commission
- Andy Williams -- Cleveland Village Board
- Brian Defferding -- Winnebago County Board of Supervisors, District 6

== Vote totals for Libertarian candidates in Wisconsin ==
=== Federal elections ===
==== U.S. President ====
| Year | Candidate | Votes | Percentage |
|---|---|---|---|
| 1972 | John Hospers (Write-in) | 101 | 0.01% |
| 1976 | Roger MacBride | 3,814 | 0.18% |
| 1980 | Ed Clark | 29,135 | 1.28% |
| 1984 | David Bergland | 4,884 | 0.22% |
| 1988 | Ron Paul | 5,157 | 0.56% |
| 1992 | Andre Marrou | 2,877 | 0.11% |
| 1996 | Harry Browne | 7,929 | 0.36% |
| 2000 | Harry Browne | 6,640 | 0.26% |
| 2004 | Michael Badnarik | 6,464 | 0.22% |
| 2008 | Bob Barr | 8,858 | 0.30% |
| 2012 | Gary Johnson | 20,439 | 0.67% |
| 2016 | Gary Johnson | 106,674 | 3.58% |

==== U.S. Senate ====
| Year | Candidate | Votes | Percentage |
|---|---|---|---|
| 1980 | Bervin J. Larson | 9,679 | 0.44% |
| 1992 | William Bittner | 9,147 | 0.4% |
| 1994 | James R. Dean | 15,439 | 1.0% |
| 1998 | Tom Ender | 5,591 | 0.32% |
| 2000 | Tim Peterson | 21,348 | 0.8% |
| 2004 | Arif Khan | 8,367 | 0.28% |
| 2012 | Joseph Kexel | 62,240 | 2.07% |
| 2016 | Phillip Anderson | 87,531 | 2.97% |

=== State elections ===
==== Gubernatorial ====
| Year | Candidate | Votes | Percentage |
|---|---|---|---|
| 1982 | Larry Smiley | 9,734 | 0.62% |
| 1994 | David Harmon | 11,639 | 0.74% |
| 1998 | Jim Mueller | 11,071 | 0.63% |
| 2002 | Ed Thompson | 185,455 | 10.45% |
| 2010 | Terry Virgil | 6,790 | 0.31% |
| 2014 | Robert Burke | 18,720 | 0.78% |
| 2018 | Phillip Anderson | 20,320 | 0.76% |

== Conventions ==
- 2016 – The 2016 convention was held on April 16 in Wisconsin Dells, and included speaker David Boaz and presidential candidate Gary Johnson.
- 2017 – The 2017 LPWI convention was held in Tomahawk on April 21, and included speaker Gavin Seim.
- 2018 – The 2018 LPWI convention was held in Madison on April 14.
- 2019 – The 2019 LPWI convention was held in Sturgeon Bay from May 3–5. Mary Ruwart was a speaker.
- 2021 - The 2021 LPWI convention was held in Eau Claire, Wisconsin from April 23–25. Speakers include Jo Jorgensen, Spike Cohen, Adam Kokesh.

== See also ==
- Political party strength in Wisconsin
- Comparison of politics of parties of the United States
