= Al Thompson (disambiguation) =

Al Thompson (1884–1960) was an American actor.

Al Thompson may also refer to:

- Al Thompson and Son's
- Al Thompson, bassist in Bill Haley and the Comets

== See also ==
- Albert Thompson (disambiguation)
- Allen Thompson (disambiguation)
- Alan Thompson (disambiguation)
- Alvin Thompson (born 1953), judge
