= Albert Thompson =

Albert Thompson may refer to:

- Albert Thompson (Australian politician) (1886–1973), Australian politician
- Albert Thompson (Georgia politician) (1922–2004), American politician and jurist
- Albert Meysey-Thompson (1848–1894), English footballer
- Albert Thompson (footballer, born 1885) (1885–1956), English footballer
- Albert Thompson (footballer, born 1912) (1912–?), Welsh footballer
- Albert Thompson (sport shooter) (born 1952), Irish sports shooter
- Albert C. Thompson (1842–1910), American judge
- Albert G. Thompson (1928–2016), American educator and philanthropist

== See also ==
- Al Thompson (disambiguation)
- Bert Thompson (disambiguation)
