= Matt Flynn (politician) =

American novelist and politician

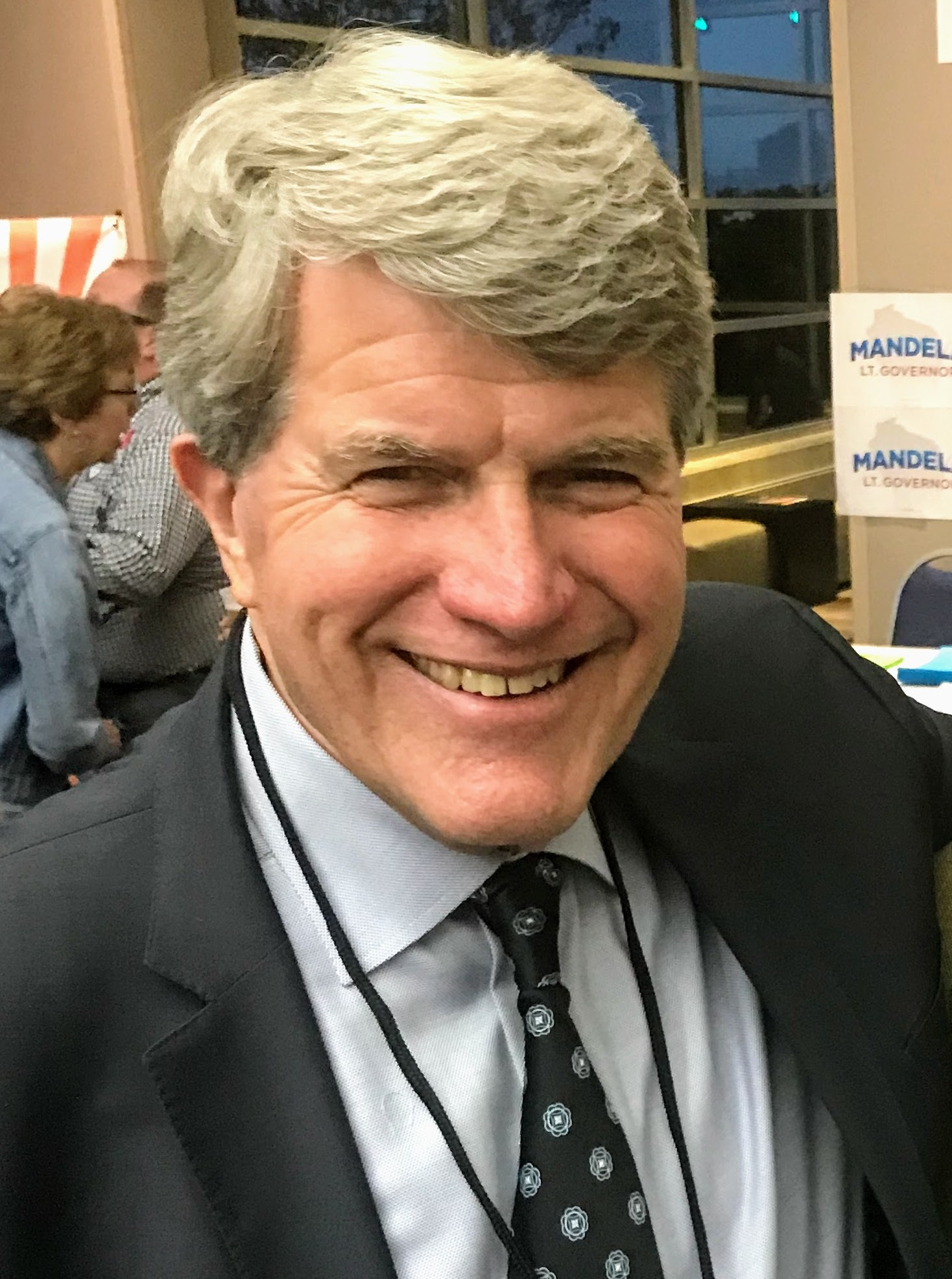

Chair of the Wisconsin Democratic Party
- In office October 1981 – June 1985
- Preceded by: Joe Checota
- Succeeded by: Suellen Albrecht

Personal details
- Born: Matthew Joseph Flynn; October 3, 1947 (age 79) New York City, U.S.
- Party: Democratic
- Education: Yale University (BA); University of Wisconsin–Madison (JD)

Matthew Joseph Flynn (born October 3, 1947) is an American attorney and politician from Wisconsin. Flynn served as chairman of the Democratic Party of Wisconsin from 1981 to 1985 and as a partner in the Milwaukee law firm of Quarles & Brady. Flynn ran unsuccessfully for the Democratic nomination for Governor of Wisconsin in 2018 and is a past unsuccessful candidate for federal office.

== Early life and military service ==
Flynn was born in 1947 in New York City and raised in Middlebush, New Jersey. He graduated from Yale College in 1969 and served as an officer in the United States Navy from 1969 to 1972. After being honorably discharged, Flynn subsequently attended the University of Wisconsin Law School, where, in his capacity as editor-in-chief of the Wisconsin Law Review, he authored a proposal in 1974 that sought to reform the Milwaukee Police Department by increasing its political independence and accountability to the community. In the article, Flynn argued that the provisions established in the late 19th century to shield the police from venal politicians only served to make Wisconsin police independent of constructive public and political control. Flynn suggested new legislation to increase public input to check police discretion.

== Career ==
=== Early legal career and political involvement ===
Following his graduation, Flynn was a law clerk to Chief Judge Thomas Edward Fairchild of the United States Court of Appeals for the Seventh Circuit from 1975 until 1976. In 1976, Flynn entered private practice in Milwaukee with the firm Quarles & Brady.

In 1978, Flynn was the Democratic nominee for United States Representative in the 9th congressional district, losing to Republican state Senator Jim Sensenbrenner. In 1980, he served as Milwaukee County chair for U.S. Senator Ted Kennedy's unsuccessful presidential bid.

=== Wisconsin Democratic Party chairman (1981–1985) ===
In October 1981, Flynn was elected as state chair of the Democratic Party of Wisconsin. Flynn embraced a progressive platform as state chair and advocated to maintain Wisconsin's open presidential primary, a stance that put him at odds with the Democratic National Committee. During Flynn's first term as chairman, the state party reelected Senator William Proxmire and reclaimed the governorship after a four-year period of Republican control. Flynn imposed fiscal controls on party spending and mounted an aggressive fundraising campaign that eliminated debt accumulated by the party under his predecessors.

=== Litigation ===
After completing his second term as state Democratic chairman, Flynn returned to Quarles & Brady, retiring in 2017 as a partner. During his career, Flynn represented clients including the Episcopal Diocese of Milwaukee, Milwaukee-based corporation Johnson Controls, local TV station WISN-TV, and the Archdiocese of Milwaukee in civil litigation concerning the Catholic Church sex abuse crisis. In his personal capacity, Flynn has supported expanding reporting requirements surrounding sex abuse and increasing the civil liability of clergy members accused of abuse.

=== Senate and congressional elections ===
In 1986, Flynn contested the Democratic nomination for the Senate seat held by Republican Bob Kasten, placing second to former deputy attorney general Ed Garvey in the primary. In 1988 and 2004, he placed second in Democratic primaries for Wisconsin's 5th congressional district and 4th congressional district.

During the administration of Governor Jim Doyle, Flynn served one term as chair of the governor's Judicial Selection Commission from 2004 to 2006.

=== Activism and writing (2004–present) ===
Flynn co-chaired John Kerry's unsuccessful 2004 presidential campaign in Wisconsin and served on Hillary Clinton's finance committee during her unsuccessful Wisconsin 2008 presidential primary campaign against Barack Obama.

Flynn has written two fiction novels since retirement, publishing a political satire called Pryme Knumber in 2012 and a followup work, Bernie Weber and the Riemann Hypothesis, in 2017.

Flynn has written a progressive political blog and was a regular pundit on the now-defunct Milwaukee television show Belling & Co, providing a Democratic perspective.

Flynn has hosted the radio show "Matt Flynn Direct" on WRRD since 2019.

== 2018 gubernatorial campaign ==
In October 2017, Flynn announced his candidacy for the Democratic nomination to oppose Scott Walker in the 2018 Wisconsin gubernatorial election. In November 2017, Flynn received attention for his proposal to legalize both recreational and medicinal cannabis in Wisconsin. Flynn received numerous endorsements, including the support of former Governor Tony Earl, Milwaukee County District Attorney John Chisholm, Milwaukee County Register of Deeds John La Fave, businessman Edward J. Zore, former Wisconsin Secretary of Administration Steve Bablitch, and former Wisconsin Secretary of Commerce Cory Nettles. Milwaukee County Supervisor Sylvia Ortiz-Velez also endorsed Flynn for Governor. Flynn vowed to work to repeal economic policies implemented during Governor Walker's tenure, which Flynn called "wage-killing." He also planned to introduce a bill to raise the minimum wage in Wisconsin to $15 per hour.

The Republican Party of Wisconsin criticized Flynn for his past legal work on behalf of the Archdiocese of Milwaukee in cases involving allegations of sexual abuse.

Several activists and organizations called for Flynn to drop-out of the gubernatorial race due to his representation of the Archdiocese, including State Representatives Chris Taylor and Melissa Sargent, the Women's March Wisconsin Chapter, National Organization for Women Wisconsin Chapter, the Survivors Network of those Abused by Priests, and The Capital Times. Flynn has responded by telling his critics to "jump in a lake." Flynn compared accusations against him to "McCarthyism" and told a survivor of abuse to "knock it off."

Flynn finished sixth in the Democratic primary, garnering 5.9% of the primary vote, to 41.8% for primary victor Tony Evers.

== Electoral history ==
=== U.S. House, 4th district (2004) ===
Year	Election	Date	Elected				Defeated				Total	Plurality
2004	Primary	Sep. 14	Gwen Moore	Democratic	48,858	64.20%	Matt Flynn	Dem.	19,377	25.46%	76,103	29,481
2004	Primary	Sep. 14	Gwen Moore	Democratic	48,858	64.20%	Tim Carpenter	Dem.	7,801	10.25%	76,103	29,481

=== Wisconsin Governor (2018) ===
Year	Election	Date	Elected				Defeated				Total	Plurality
2018	Primary	Aug. 14	Tony Evers	Democratic	225,082	41.77%	Mahlon Mitchell	Dem.	87,926	16.32%	538,857	137,156
2018	Primary	Aug. 14	Tony Evers	Democratic	225,082	41.77%	Kelda Roys	Dem.	69,086	12.82%	538,857	137,156
2018	Primary	Aug. 14	Tony Evers	Democratic	225,082	41.77%	Kathleen Vinehout	Dem.	44,168	8.20%	538,857	137,156
2018	Primary	Aug. 14	Tony Evers	Democratic	225,082	41.77%	Mike McCabe	Dem.	39,885	7.40%	538,857	137,156
2018	Primary	Aug. 14	Tony Evers	Democratic	225,082	41.77%	Matt Flynn	Dem.	31,580	5.86%	538,857	137,156
2018	Primary	Aug. 14	Tony Evers	Democratic	225,082	41.77%	Paul Soglin	Dem.	28,158	5.23%	538,857	137,156
2018	Primary	Aug. 14	Tony Evers	Democratic	225,082	41.77%	Andy Gronik (withdrawn)	Dem.	6,627	1.23%	538,857	137,156
2018	Primary	Aug. 14	Tony Evers	Democratic	225,082	41.77%	Dana Wachs (withdrawn)	Dem.	4,216	0.78%	538,857	137,156
2018	Primary	Aug. 14	Tony Evers	Democratic	225,082	41.77%	Josh Pade	Dem.	1,908	0.35%	538,857	137,156
2018	Primary	Aug. 14	Tony Evers	Democratic	225,082	41.77%	Paul Boucher (write-in)	Dem.	10	0.00%	538,857	137,156
