= Doug Kane =

American politician

Douglas Nelson Kane is an American politician, economist, and author who served as a Democratic member of the Illinois House of Representatives from 1975 to 1983.

== Early life ==
Kane earned a Bachelor of Arts in English, a Master of Science in journalism, and a Ph.D. in economics, all from the University of Illinois Urbana-Champaign. He worked for Democratic house staff and Governor Dan Walker and was a delegate for Edmund Muskie at the 1972 Democratic National Convention. He was elected to the Capital Township Board of Auditors in 1969 and served a single four-year term.

== Illinois House of Representatives ==
In the 1974 general election, Kane was elected to the Illinois House of Representatives as one of three members from the 50th district, which included Sangamon and Montgomery counties, along with Republican J. David Jones and fellow Democrat James T. Londrigan. Kane represented the Springfield area from 1975 to 1983.

== Post-legislative career in Illinois ==
In 1983, Kane became the executive director of the EPTOW Coalition, a joint effort between Illinois Railroads Association, the Taxpayers' Federation of Illinois, the League of Women Voters of Illinois and the Illinois Environmental Council, to create a user fee for truck drivers to cover the costs of repairs resulting from an increased weight limit. He also served as Deputy Auditor General for a time in the 1980s.

In the 1986 congressional election, Kane successfully ran for the Democratic nomination as a write-in candidate before opting not to be a candidate in the general election. Local party leaders appointed James Dawson, a member of the Tazewell County Board, to be the nominee. In 1992, Kane ran for the Illinois Senate against State Representative Karen Hasara to represent the newly drawn 50th district which included Sangamon and Menard counties as well as the eastern half of Cass County.

== Move to Wisconsin ==
In 1995, Kane and his wife Kathleen Vinehout moved to Alma, Wisconsin to pursue farming. In 2006, Vinehout was elected to the Wisconsin State Senate. In 2014, Kane was elected to the Buffalo County, Wisconsin Board of Supervisors and is the chairman of the board. He served for a time on the school board in Alma, Wisconsin.

Kane is an economist and President of Program Analysis Inc., a consulting firm that specializes in economic and public policy issues. One of his current clients is the State of Illinois Office of Management and Budget that sought his help with the economic effects of the gross receipts tax.

Kane's book Our Politics: Reflections on Political Life was published in 2019 by Southern Illinois University Press. It describes the travails of public office and the political, economic, and social forces that shape political decision-making. He publishes weekly articles on the blog View from a Distance.
