= Bert Thomson =

Bert or Bertie Thomson may refer to:

- Bert Thomson (bowls) (born 1927), Scottish international lawn bowler
- Bert Thomson, musician with Eva Trout
- Bert Thomson, councillor in South Lanarkshire Council election, 2012
- Bertie Thomson (1907–1937), Scottish footballer
- Bert Thomson (footballer, born 1929) (1929–2011), Scottish footballer, wing half for Rochdale, see List of Rochdale A.F.C. players (25–99 appearances)

== See also ==
- Bert Thompson (disambiguation)
- Herbert Thomson, engineer
