= Bert Thompson =

Bert Thompson may refer to:

- Bert Thompson (musician) who worked with John C. Marshall (musician), see de:Bert Thompson
- Bert Thompson (Canadian politician), candidate in 2009 Nova Scotia general election and Dartmouth East
- Bert Thompson, character in Holiday on the Buses played by Wilfrid Brambell
- Bert Thompson (Christian apologist), see Level of support for evolution

== See also ==
- Albert Thompson (disambiguation)
- Robert Thompson (disambiguation)
- Herbert Thompson (disambiguation)
- Bertie Thompson, athlete
- Bert Thomson (disambiguation)
