= Quarles & Brady =

United States law firm

Quarles & Brady LLP
- Headquarters: 411 East Wisconsin Center; Milwaukee, Wisconsin
- No. of offices: 13
- No. of attorneys: 550 (2023)
- Major practice areas: Business Law | Intellectual Property Law | Employment Law | Environment Law | Litigation | Real Estate Law | Health Care Law | Trust & Estate Law | Franchise Law.
- Key people: Michael Aldana, Managing Partner and Chair of Executive Committee
- Revenue: $349M (2023)
- Profit per equity partner: $813,000 (2023)
- Date founded: 1892
- Founder: Joseph V. Quarles Jr., Thomas Wilson Spence & Charles Quarles (Quarles, Spence & Quarles); William McIlvaine & John P. Wilson (Wilson & McIlvaine)
- Company type: Limited liability partnership
- Website: Quarles.com

Quarles & Brady LLP is an American law firm with thirteen offices nationwide. According to the National Law Journal's 2012 rankings, it is the 107th largest law firm in the United States, and the second-largest firm in the state of Wisconsin (after Foley & Lardner). The firm also ranked 184th in profit per attorney on the 2010 AmLaw 200 survey.

== History ==
The Quarles firm was formed in 1892. In 1974, the Quarles firm & Brady firm merged. At the time, the combined firm had 70 lawyers In 2000, the firm merged with Streich Lang, a Phoenix, Arizona law firm. After being known in Arizona as Quarles & Brady Streich Lang LLP, the firm shortened its name and is now uniformly known as Quarles & Brady LLP.

== Practice areas ==
Quarles & Brady has practices in commercial litigation, product liability, environmental law, regulatory compliance, Corporate law & securities law, mergers & acquisitions, private equity, antitrust, tax law, intellectual property, and real estate.

== Notable lawyers and alumni ==
- John Daniels Jr., philanthropist, businessman and former chairman.
- Tony Earl, 41st Governor of Wisconsin (1983–1986).
- Ron Kind, U.S. Congressman who represented Wisconsin's 3rd congressional district from 1997 to 2023.
- Matt Flynn, former chair of the Democratic Party of Wisconsin and candidate for governor in 2018.
- Joseph V. Quarles Jr., co-founder of the firm, U.S. senator (1899–1905) and U.S. district judge (1905–1911).
- Kwame Raoul, 42nd Attorney General of Illinois (2019–present).
- David S. Ruder, chairman of the U.S. Securities and Exchange Commission (1987–1989)
- Thomas Wilson Spence, co-founder of the firm, state legislator, died during arguments in front of the Wisconsin Supreme Court (1912).
