= Thomas Reay =

English cricketer and clergyman

Personal information
- Full name: Thomas Osmotherly Reay
- Born: 24 January 1834; London, England
- Died: 14 June 1914 (aged 80); Prittlewell, Essex, England
- Batting: Unknown
- Relatives: Oswell Borradaile (cousin)

Domestic team information
- Years: Team
- 1853–1855: Marylebone Cricket Club

Career statistics
Competition	First-class
Matches	2
Runs scored	14
Batting average	7.00
100s/50s	–/–
Top score	8
Catches/stumpings	1/–
- Source: Cricinfo, 13 May 2021

Thomas Osmotherly Reay (24 January 1834 – 14 June 1914) was an English first-class cricketer and clergyman.

The son of John Reay, he was born at London in January 1834. He was educated at Eton College, where he played for the cricket eleven for three years. From Eton he went up to Exeter College, Oxford. Reay was a member of Oxford University Cricket Club, but did not play first-class cricket for the club. He did however play two first-class matches for the Marylebone Cricket Club while studying at Oxford, playing against the Surrey Club at The Oval in 1853 and Oxford University at Oxford in 1855. He scored 14 runs in these two matches, with a highest score of 8.

After graduating from Oxford he took holy orders in the Anglican Church. Reay held two ecclesiastical posts in Essex, the first at Dovercourt from 1871 to 1880, and the second at Prittlewell for 34 years from 1880. He was also a chaplain to the 1st Essex Artillery Volunteers. He died at Prittlewell. His cousin was Oswell Borradaile, a prominent figure in Essex County Cricket Club.
