= Mike McCabe =

American activist (born 1960)

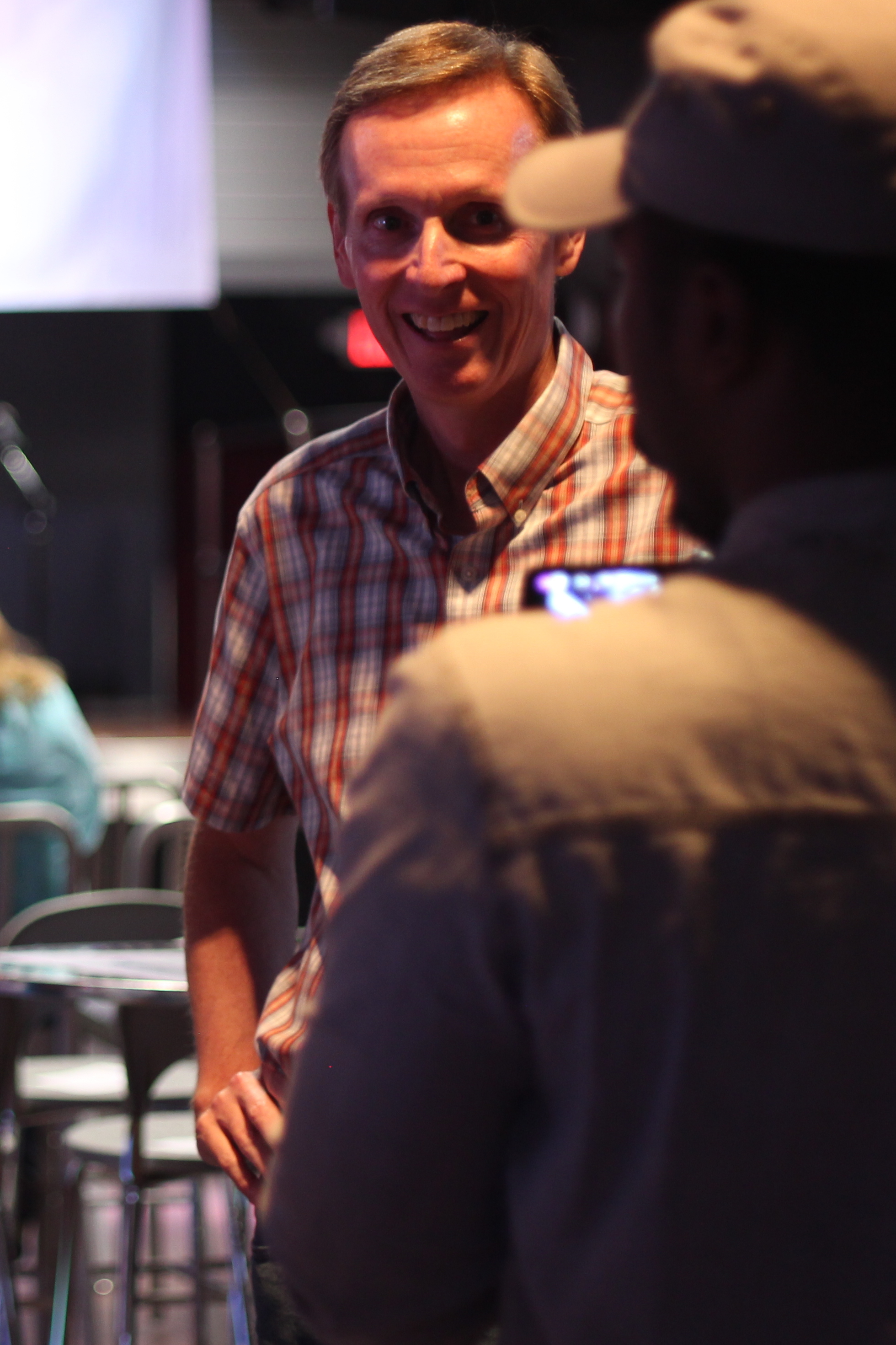
- Born: May 23, 1960 (age 66); Stoughton, Wisconsin, U.S.
- Education: University of Wisconsin, Madison (BA)
- Political party: Democratic

Mike McCabe (born May 23, 1960) is a political reform activist in Wisconsin. He worked for 15 years as executive director of the Wisconsin Democracy Campaign and founded Blue Jean Nation, a nonpartisan group that describes itself as "commoners working to house the politically homeless and transform parties that are failing America."

On September 12, 2017, McCabe announced that he would run as a Democrat in the 2018 Wisconsin gubernatorial election, stating that it was in response to a letter from 190 Wisconsinites urging him to run. McCabe placed fifth in the primary election.

== Early life and career ==
McCabe was born in Stoughton, Wisconsin and lived on an 80-acre farm near Evansville in the early part of his childhood. He grew up on a 200-acre farm outside of Curtiss for most of his upbringing. McCabe is a 1978 graduate of Owen-Withee High School, which inducted him into its Alumni Hall of Fame in 2014, and a 1982 graduate of the University of Wisconsin School of Journalism, which honored him with its Distinguished Service Award in 2015.

Mike worked for six years as communications director and legislative liaison for Madison public schools. He also worked as a newspaper reporter and as a legislative aide for three Republican members of the Wisconsin State Assembly. In addition, he served with his wife in the Peace Corps in the West African country of Mali. For 15 years, McCabe was the head of the Wisconsin Democracy Campaign, a group that lobbies for having taxpayers finance political campaigns to reduce the influence of special interests. While claiming to be bipartisan, his organizations were decidedly pro-Democrat and anti-Republican.

McCabe's group was influential in banning the legislative caucus staff that performed campaign work on state time. He also helped pass laws that created a public financing system for state Supreme Court races and established the nonpartisan Government Accountability Board to oversee elections and ethics laws — though both those laws were later repealed by Scott Walker. With McCabe as executive director, the Wisconsin Democracy Campaign tracked campaign contributions during state elections in pursuit of its mission, which is to "advocate for a real democracy that allows the common good to prevail over narrow interests by reinforcing and protecting the values of honesty, fairness, transparency, accountability, citizen participation, competition, and respect for constitutional rights and the rule of law."

== 2018 gubernatorial campaign ==
McCabe announced his political committee "Commoners for Mike McCabe" and gubernatorial run in July 2017. McCabe ran as a Democrat once before, against Mark Pocan for the state Assembly in 1998.

== Books ==
In 2014, McCabe published Blue Jeans in High Places sharing his view of Wisconsin state politics, which he regards as corrupt and highly influenced by political financiers and lobbyists.

A similar work, more concerned with treatment than diagnosis, was Unscrewing America: Hints and Hopes from the Heartland (2020). His novel about a misunderstood rural Wisconsin youth, Miracles along County Q, was published in 2024.

== Electoral history ==
=== Wisconsin Governor (2018) ===
Year	Election	Date	Elected				Defeated				Total	Plurality
2018	Primary	Aug. 14	Tony Evers	Democratic	225,082	41.77%	Mahlon Mitchell	Dem.	87,926	16.32%	538,857	137,156
2018	Primary	Aug. 14	Tony Evers	Democratic	225,082	41.77%	Kelda Roys	Dem.	69,086	12.82%	538,857	137,156
2018	Primary	Aug. 14	Tony Evers	Democratic	225,082	41.77%	Kathleen Vinehout	Dem.	44,168	8.20%	538,857	137,156
2018	Primary	Aug. 14	Tony Evers	Democratic	225,082	41.77%	Mike McCabe	Dem.	39,885	7.40%	538,857	137,156
2018	Primary	Aug. 14	Tony Evers	Democratic	225,082	41.77%	Matt Flynn	Dem.	31,580	5.86%	538,857	137,156
2018	Primary	Aug. 14	Tony Evers	Democratic	225,082	41.77%	Paul Soglin	Dem.	28,158	5.23%	538,857	137,156
2018	Primary	Aug. 14	Tony Evers	Democratic	225,082	41.77%	Andy Gronik (withdrawn)	Dem.	6,627	1.23%	538,857	137,156
2018	Primary	Aug. 14	Tony Evers	Democratic	225,082	41.77%	Dana Wachs (withdrawn)	Dem.	4,216	0.78%	538,857	137,156
2018	Primary	Aug. 14	Tony Evers	Democratic	225,082	41.77%	Josh Pade	Dem.	1,908	0.35%	538,857	137,156
2018	Primary	Aug. 14	Tony Evers	Democratic	225,082	41.77%	Paul Boucher (write-in)	Dem.	10	0.00%	538,857	137,156
