= Paul Soglin =

American politician (born 1945)

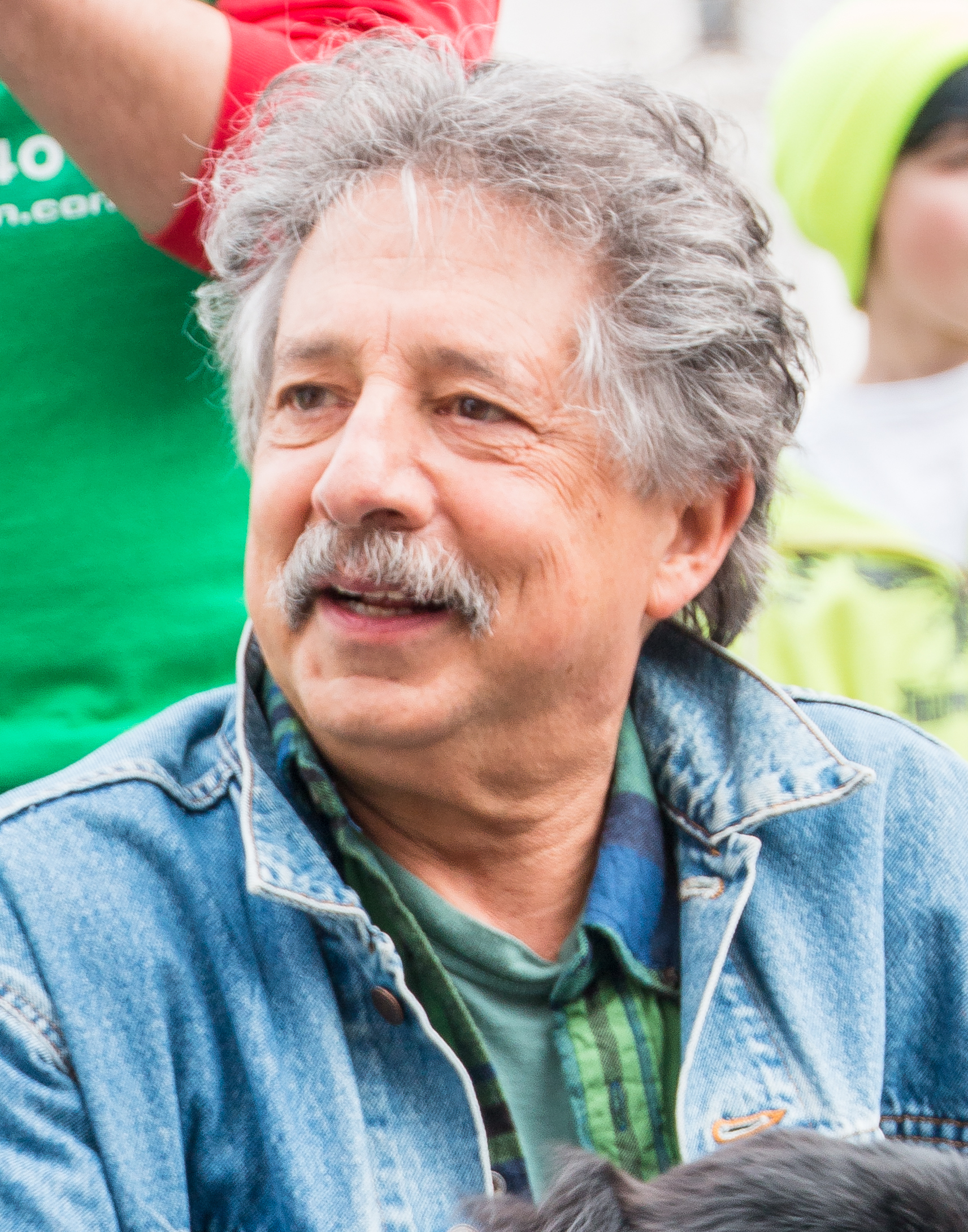
- Soglin in 2015

50th, 53rd, and 56th Mayor of Madison
- In office April 19, 2011 – April 16, 2019
- Preceded by: Dave Cieslewicz
- Succeeded by: Satya Rhodes-Conway
- In office April 18, 1989 – April 15, 1997
- Preceded by: F. Joseph Sensenbrenner Jr.
- Succeeded by: Susan J. M. Bauman
- In office April 17, 1973 – April 17, 1979
- Preceded by: William Dyke
- Succeeded by: Joel Skornicka

Personal details
- Born: April 22, 1945 (age 81) Chicago, Illinois, U.S.
- Party: Democratic
- Spouse: Sara
- Children: 3
- Education: University of Wisconsin–Madison (BA, JD)

Paul R. Soglin (born April 22, 1945) is an American politician who served as the 50th, 53rd, and 56th mayor of Madison, Wisconsin. A member of the Democratic Party, Soglin served a total of 22 years as mayor in three stints from 1973–1979, 1989–1997, and 2011–2019. He was the Democratic nominee for Wisconsin's 2nd congressional district in 1996 and ran in the 2018 Democratic primary for governor of Wisconsin.

== Early life and education ==
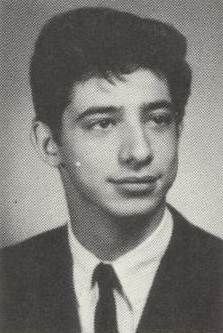
Soglin in the University of Wisconsin–Madison yearbook, 1966

Soglin was raised in the Hyde Park neighborhood of Chicago, Illinois. He attended Hyde Park High School (now Hyde Park Career Academy) and graduated from Highland Park High School in 1962. He enrolled at the University of Wisconsin–Madison that fall as a pre-medical student, obtaining a Bachelor of Arts with honors in history in 1966. After spending three years in the university's history graduate program, he went on to earn a Juris Doctor degree from the University of Wisconsin Law School in 1972. Both of Soglin's parents were Jewish and he and his siblings were raised as secular Jews. On Sundays he attended the South Side School of Jewish Studies.

== Activism ==
In 1962 he was elected treasurer of the UW-Madison chapter of the Student Nonviolent Coordinating Committee (SNCC). In October 1963, Soglin joined 200 classmates at a rally on the steps of the Memorial Union protesting the presence of U.S. military advisers who were suspected of active participation in the Vietnam War.

In 1964 a group of suburban women partnered with William Moyer, Grace Mary and Hub Stern and other Chicago area activists focusing their Housing Opportunities Program through the Chicago Regional Office of the American Friends Service Committee (AFSC). The effort which was to create open housing in the Chicago suburbs was known as the North Shore Summer Project (NSSP). In the late spring of 1965 Soglin and a dozen other college students set out in suburbs such as Winnetka, Wilmette, and Kenilworth going door-to door with petitions calling for real estate agents to show and sell homes to "Negroes". Before the summer was out volunteers had contacted over 600 home sellers and over 1,500 other residents.

Soglin participated in demonstrations against the Dow Chemical Company on the University of Wisconsin–Madison campus in 1967. Dow had come to the University of Wisconsin–Madison campus to recruit engineering students as potential new employees, but students protested the company's presence because of Dow's role in the manufacture of napalm and Agent Orange used in Vietnam. Beaten by police during the demonstrations, Soglin was elected to lead the subsequent student strike.

Much of this demonstration was captured on film, and an interview of Soglin by journalist and author David Maraniss served as the basis for several chapters of the book They Marched Into Sunlight, and for the PBS documentary Two Days in October. Interview footage with Soglin also figures prominently in the documentary, The War at Home (1979), which chronicled the history of Madison in the Vietnam War era.

== Political career ==
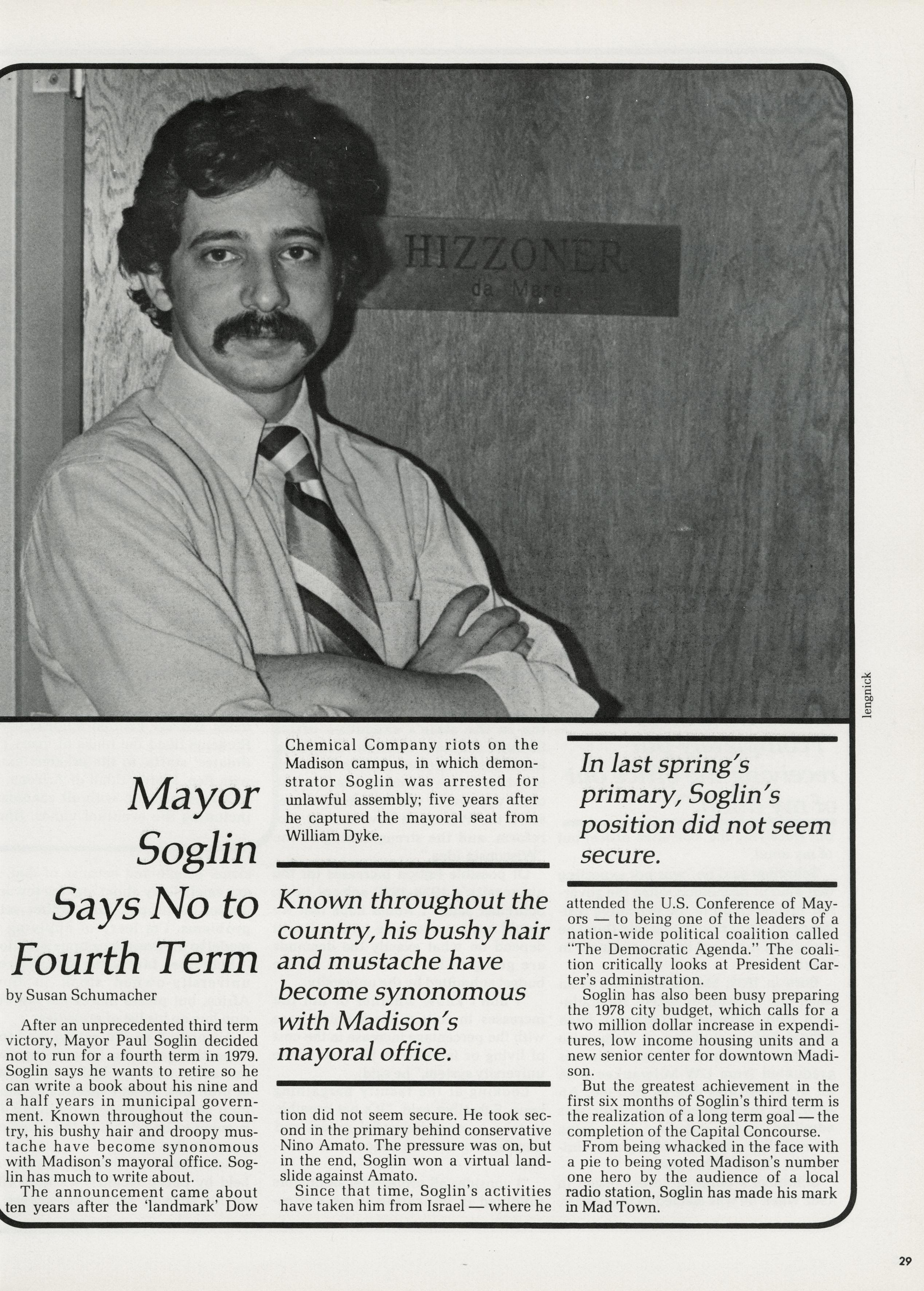
Soglin in the University of Wisconsin–Madison yearbook, 1978

While a graduate student in the University of Wisconsin–Madison History Department, Soglin was elected to the Madison Common Council in 1968. He was re-elected in 1970 and 1972. In November 1972, Soglin announced that he was a candidate for mayor of Madison. He advanced in the March 1973 primary election, and upset incumbent Mayor William Dyke in the April 3, 1973, spring general election.

In May 1969, Soglin, while representing the Eighth Ward, was arrested twice at the first Mifflin Street Block Party. He was tried and found guilty of failing to obey the lawful order of a police officer. The charge of unlawful assembly was dismissed in Dane County Courts. The arrest was later described as a "badge of honor," as Soglin was intentionally defying the city's attempt to ban the left-wing gathering.

Soglin served as mayor of Madison for three terms, from 1973 to 1979. In 1975, Mayor Soglin gave the key to the city to Cuban Prime Minister Fidel Castro. From 1979 to 1980 he was a fellow at Harvard Kennedy School at Harvard University. After working for nearly a decade as a lawyer in Madison, Soglin returned to office in 1989, serving three additional terms as mayor until 1997. In October 1996 he announced he would resign as mayor effective April 1997, regardless of the outcome of his congressional campaign. At the time Soglin was campaigning for the United States House of Representatives, seeking to represent Wisconsin's 2nd congressional district in the election scheduled for November 5, 1996. His bid was unsuccessful. In 2003, he sought election again as mayor of Madison and was defeated by a narrow margin by Dave Cieslewicz.

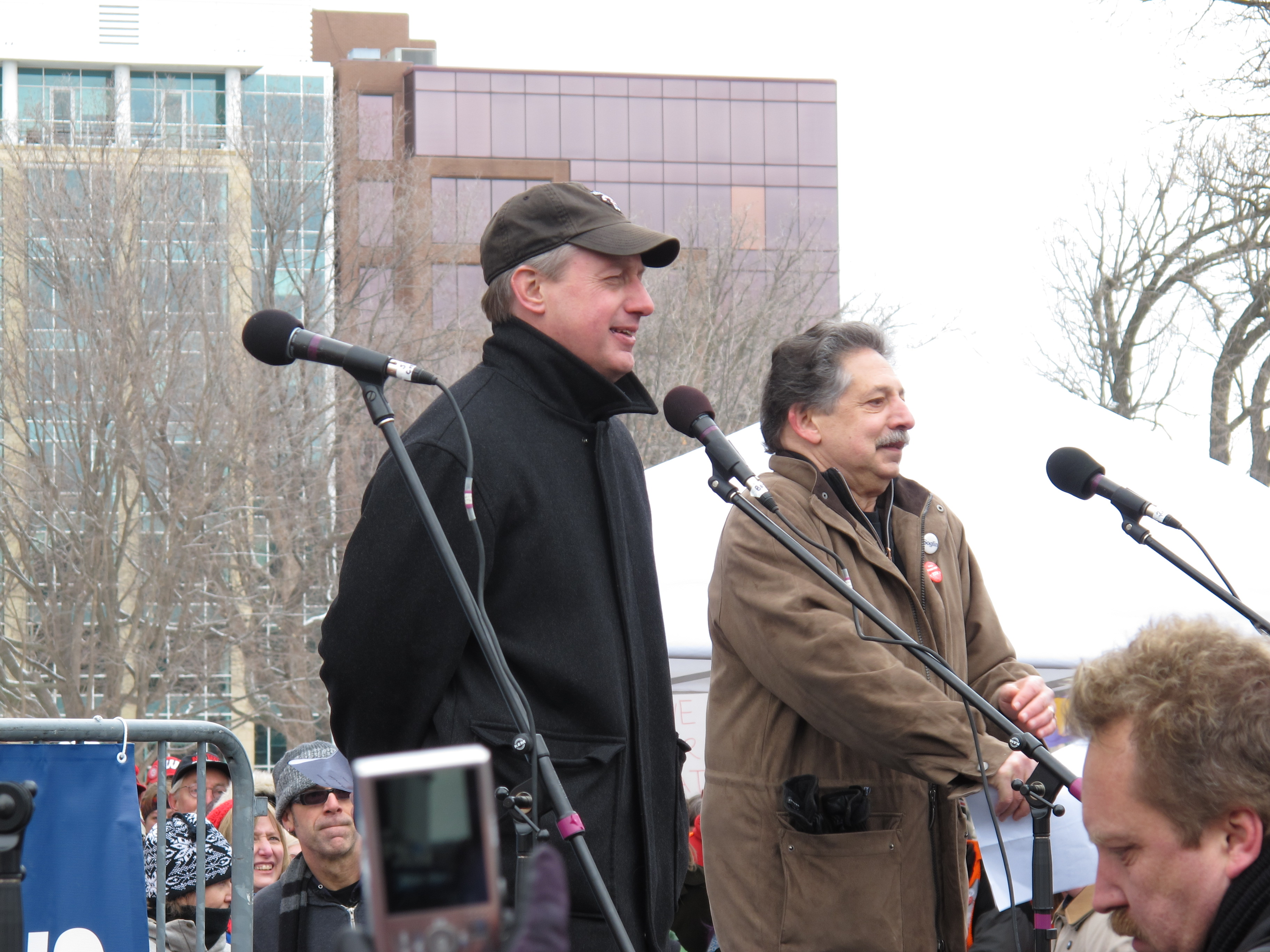
Dave Cieslewicz and Soglin speaking at a rally during the 2011 Wisconsin protests

Soglin returned to city politics in 2011 as a candidate in the 2011 mayoral election, where he defeated the incumbent Cieslewicz in a close race. He took the oath of office for his third stint as mayor on April 19, 2011. After returning to office in 2011, food policy in the city became a priority for Mayor Soglin. In 2013, he was named Chairman of the Food Policy Task Force of the United States Conference of Mayors. He initially served as co-chair with Boston Mayor Thomas Menino, and later was co-chair with Washington, D.C., Mayor Muriel Bowser. The task force was established to develop strategies to increase access to healthy, affordable food in low-income communities, increase food procurement from local sources, promote food-related economic development, and reduce obesity. In 2018, Soglin and Bowser, at the 86th winter meeting of the U.S. Conference of Mayors in Washington, D.C., announced they would join 160 other cities in signing the Milan Urban Food Policy Pact.

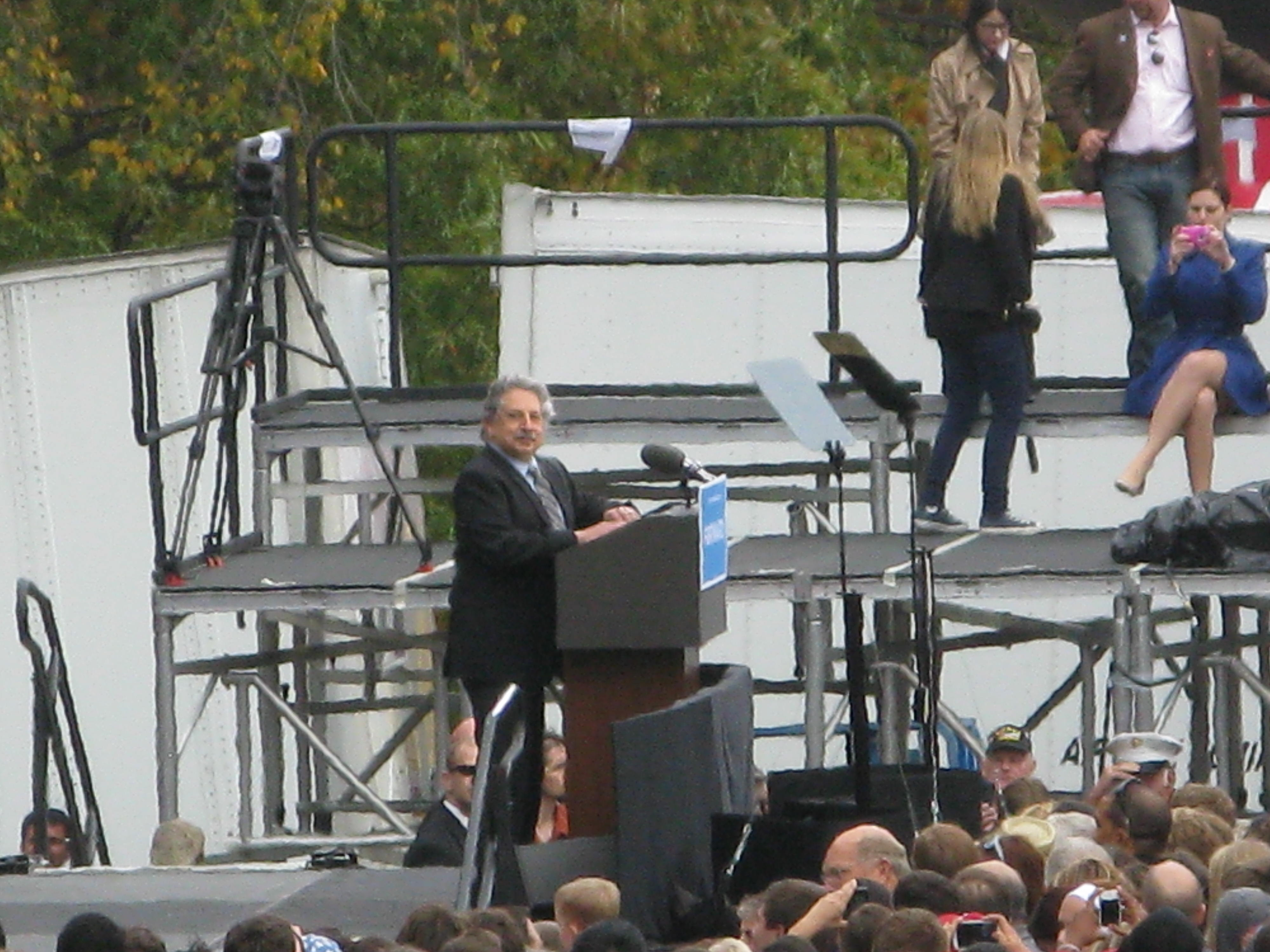
Soglin speaking at a September 2012 rally for the Barack Obama presidential re-election campaign

On April 7, 2015, Soglin was again re-elected defeating Alderman Scott Resnick with a record 72% of the vote 37,790 to 14,235. Mayor Soglin jokingly said, using the rhetoric of his critics, "I'm the guy, if you can't tell the difference between us, who is identified as old, tired, gray and bland. Well, I'm going to show you old, tired, gray and bland."

Soglin joined the 2018 campaign for governor of Wisconsin, running in the Democratic primary against nine other candidates. Soglin eventually finished a distant seventh in the Democratic primary, losing to state superintendent Tony Evers, who would ultimately go on to defeat incumbent Governor Scott Walker in the general election.

Despite initially stating during his gubernatorial campaign that he would not run for reelection as mayor of Madison, Soglin announced that he would be seeking another term in October 2018. Soglin ultimately advanced through the February primary election, but was defeated in the April general election by former alderman Satya Rhodes-Conway. Rhodes-Conway became Madison's first openly-gay mayor, and only the second female mayor in the city's history. Soglin was defeated soundly in the election by a wide 62% to 38% margin. Rhodes-Conway won in over 80% of the city's wards, but ran up large majorities in the University of Wisconsin precincts that had first brought Soglin to office 46 years earlier.

=== Accomplishments as mayor ===
Among the changes and accomplishments on Soglin's watch:

- Soglin led the project to construct the State Street Mall and the Concourse around the Capitol Square.
- Under his guidance, the city started its first day care program, providing certification for independent day care centers.
- During his first administration, the city coordinated renovation of several buildings on State Street to build the Madison Civic Center. (That center was later renovated and is now the Overture Center.)
- Soglin led reforms in the city's hiring of women and minorities.
- Soglin led the city of Madison's effort in the 1990s of Monona Terrace, to construct a building conceived by architect Frank Lloyd Wright in the 1930s.
- In 1975, Soglin became the first U.S. mayor and only the fourth politician from the United States to meet Fidel Castro.

Madison's bond rating (per Moody's Investment Services) was upgraded from AA to AAA status in Soglin's first term in office after he made a personal visit to the New York offices of the rating company. Madison was also named to the most livable cities list several times during Soglin's second tenure as mayor, capturing the number one spot in 1996 and again in 1998.

In 2018 the Brookings Institution found that of the one hundred largest U.S. cities, "...only 11 metro areas achieved inclusive economic growth and prosperity by posting improvements across every measure: Cincinnati, Des Moines, Detroit, Greenville, Madison, Minneapolis–St. Paul, Portland, Providence, San Francisco, Spokane, and Washington, D.C."

== Personal life ==
Soglin is married and has 3 children, 1 of whom is actress Rachael Soglin.

== Electoral history ==
=== Madison Mayor (1973–1977) ===
1973 Madison mayoral election
Party	Candidate	Votes	%	±%
Primary Election, March 6, 1973
Nonpartisan	William Dyke (incumbent)	16,243	36.16%	
Nonpartisan	Paul Soglin	11,485	25.56%	
Nonpartisan	David Stewart	10,350	23.04%	
Nonpartisan	Leo Cooper	6,150	13.69%	
Nonpartisan	R. Whelan Burke	283	0.63%	
Nonpartisan	David Robb	161	0.36%	
Nonpartisan	Joseph Kraemer	122	0.27%	
Nonpartisan	Mark Gregersen	27	0.06%	
	Scattering	105	0.23%	
Total votes		44,926	100.0%	
General Election, April 3, 1973
Nonpartisan	Paul Soglin	37,548	52.35%	
Nonpartisan	William Dyke (incumbent)	34,179	47.65%	
Plurality		3,369	4.70%	
Total votes		71,727	100.0%	

=== United States House of Representatives (1996) ===
Wisconsin's 2nd congressional district election, 1996
Party	Candidate	Votes	%	±%
Primary Election, September 10, 1996
Republican	Scott L. Klug (incumbent)	26,750	45.39%	
Democratic	Paul Soglin	25,439	43.17%	
Democratic	Patrick J. O'Brien	6,576	11.16%	
Libertarian	Ben Masel	165	0.27%	
Total votes		58,930	100.0%	
General Election, November 5, 1996
Republican	Scott L. Klug (incumbent)	154,557	57.36%	
Democratic	Paul Soglin	110,467	41.00%	
Libertarian	Ben Masel	4,226	1.57%	
Plurality		44,090	16.36%	
Total votes		269,450	100.0%	
Republican hold				

=== Madison Mayor (2003) ===
Madison, Wisconsin, Mayoral Election, 2003
Party	Candidate	Votes	%	±%
Primary Election, February 20, 2003
Nonpartisan	Dave Cieslewicz	14,326	35.16%	
Nonpartisan	Paul Soglin	14,144	34.72%	
Nonpartisan	Bert G. Zipperer	6,610	16.22%	
Nonpartisan	Susan J. M. Bauman (incumbent)	4,681	11.49%	
Nonpartisan	Will Sandstrom	492	1.20%	
Nonpartisan	Davy Mayer	389	0.95%	
Write-in		92	0.22%	
Total votes		45,415	100.0%	
General Election, April 4, 2003
Nonpartisan	Dave Cieslewicz	29,717	50.76%	
Nonpartisan	Paul Soglin	28,528	48.73%	
Plurality		1,189	2.03%	
Total votes		58,536	100.0%	

=== Madison Mayor (2011–2019) ===
Year	Election	Date	Elected				Defeated				Total	Plurality
2011	Primary	Feb. 15	Paul Soglin	Nonpartisan	18,693	49.49%	Dave Cieslewicz (inc)	Non.	17,500	46.33%	37,771	1,193
2011	Primary	Feb. 15	Paul Soglin	Nonpartisan	18,693	49.49%	Nick Hart	Non.	598	1.58%	37,771	1,193
2011	Primary	Feb. 15	Paul Soglin	Nonpartisan	18,693	49.49%	John Blotz	Non.	569	1.50%	37,771	1,193
2011	Primary	Feb. 15	Paul Soglin	Nonpartisan	18,693	49.49%	Dennis Amadeus de Nure	Non.	274	0.72%	37,771	1,193
2011	General	Apr. 5	Paul Soglin	Nonpartisan	44,542	49.76%	Dave Cieslewicz (inc)	Non.	43,829	48.96%	89,504	713
2015	Primary	Feb. 17	Paul Soglin (inc)	Nonpartisan	11,856	52.79%	Scott Resnick	Non.	5,223	23.25%	22,460	6,633
2015	Primary	Feb. 17	Paul Soglin (inc)	Nonpartisan	11,856	52.79%	Bridget Maniaci	Non.	3,311	14.74%	22,460	6,633
2015	Primary	Feb. 17	Paul Soglin (inc)	Nonpartisan	11,856	52.79%	Richard V. Brown Sr.	Non.	1,034	4.60%	22,460	6,633
2015	Primary	Feb. 17	Paul Soglin (inc)	Nonpartisan	11,856	52.79%	Christopher Daly	Non.	973	4.33%	22,460	6,633
2015	General	Apr. 7	Paul Soglin (inc)	Nonpartisan	37,734	71.96%	Scott Resnick	Non.	14,195	27.07%	52,435	23,539
2019	Primary	Feb. 19	Paul Soglin (inc)	Nonpartisan	10,771	28.57%	Satya Rhodes-Conway	Non.	10,448	27.71%	37,706	323
2019	Primary	Feb. 19	Paul Soglin (inc)	Nonpartisan	10,771	28.57%	Mo Cheeks	Non.	8,801	27.45%	37,706	323
2019	Primary	Feb. 19	Paul Soglin (inc)	Nonpartisan	10,771	28.57%	Raj Shukla	Non.	6,954	16.31%	37,706	323
2019	Primary	Feb. 19	Paul Soglin (inc)	Nonpartisan	10,771	28.57%	Nick Hart	Non.	386	0.75%	37,706	323
2019	General	Apr. 2	Satya Rhodes-Conway	Nonpartisan	47,915	61.92%	Paul Soglin (inc)	Non.	29,150	37.67%	77,376	18,765

=== Wisconsin Governor (2018) ===
Year	Election	Date	Elected				Defeated				Total	Plurality
2018	Primary	Aug. 14	Tony Evers	Democratic	225,082	41.77%	Mahlon Mitchell	Dem.	87,926	16.32%	538,857	137,156
2018	Primary	Aug. 14	Tony Evers	Democratic	225,082	41.77%	Kelda Roys	Dem.	69,086	12.82%	538,857	137,156
2018	Primary	Aug. 14	Tony Evers	Democratic	225,082	41.77%	Kathleen Vinehout	Dem.	44,168	8.20%	538,857	137,156
2018	Primary	Aug. 14	Tony Evers	Democratic	225,082	41.77%	Mike McCabe	Dem.	39,885	7.40%	538,857	137,156
2018	Primary	Aug. 14	Tony Evers	Democratic	225,082	41.77%	Matt Flynn	Dem.	31,580	5.86%	538,857	137,156
2018	Primary	Aug. 14	Tony Evers	Democratic	225,082	41.77%	Paul Soglin	Dem.	28,158	5.23%	538,857	137,156
2018	Primary	Aug. 14	Tony Evers	Democratic	225,082	41.77%	Andy Gronik (withdrawn)	Dem.	6,627	1.23%	538,857	137,156
2018	Primary	Aug. 14	Tony Evers	Democratic	225,082	41.77%	Dana Wachs (withdrawn)	Dem.	4,216	0.78%	538,857	137,156
2018	Primary	Aug. 14	Tony Evers	Democratic	225,082	41.77%	Josh Pade	Dem.	1,908	0.35%	538,857	137,156
2018	Primary	Aug. 14	Tony Evers	Democratic	225,082	41.77%	Paul Boucher (write-in)	Dem.	10	0.00%	538,857	137,156

== Notes ==
Political offices
Preceded by William Dyke	Mayor of Madison; 1973–1979	Succeeded by Joel Skornicka
Preceded by F. Joseph Sensenbrenner Jr.	Mayor of Madison; 1989–1997	Succeeded by Susan J. M. Bauman
Preceded by Dave Cieslewicz	Mayor of Madison; 2011–2019	Succeeded by Satya Rhodes-Conway
