= Alan Thomson =

Alan Thomson or Allan Thomson may refer to:

- Alan Thomson (cricketer) (1945–2022), former Australian cricketer and Australian rules football umpire
- Alan Thomson (sportsman, born 1899) (1899–1938), Australian cricketer and Australian rules footballer
- Alan Thomson (canoeist) (born 1961), Canadian canoer
- Alan Thomson (musician) (born 1960), bass player and vocalist
- Allan Thomson (rugby league) (born 1943), Australian rugby league player

== See also ==
- Alan Thompson (disambiguation)
