= Kathleen Vinehout =

American politician

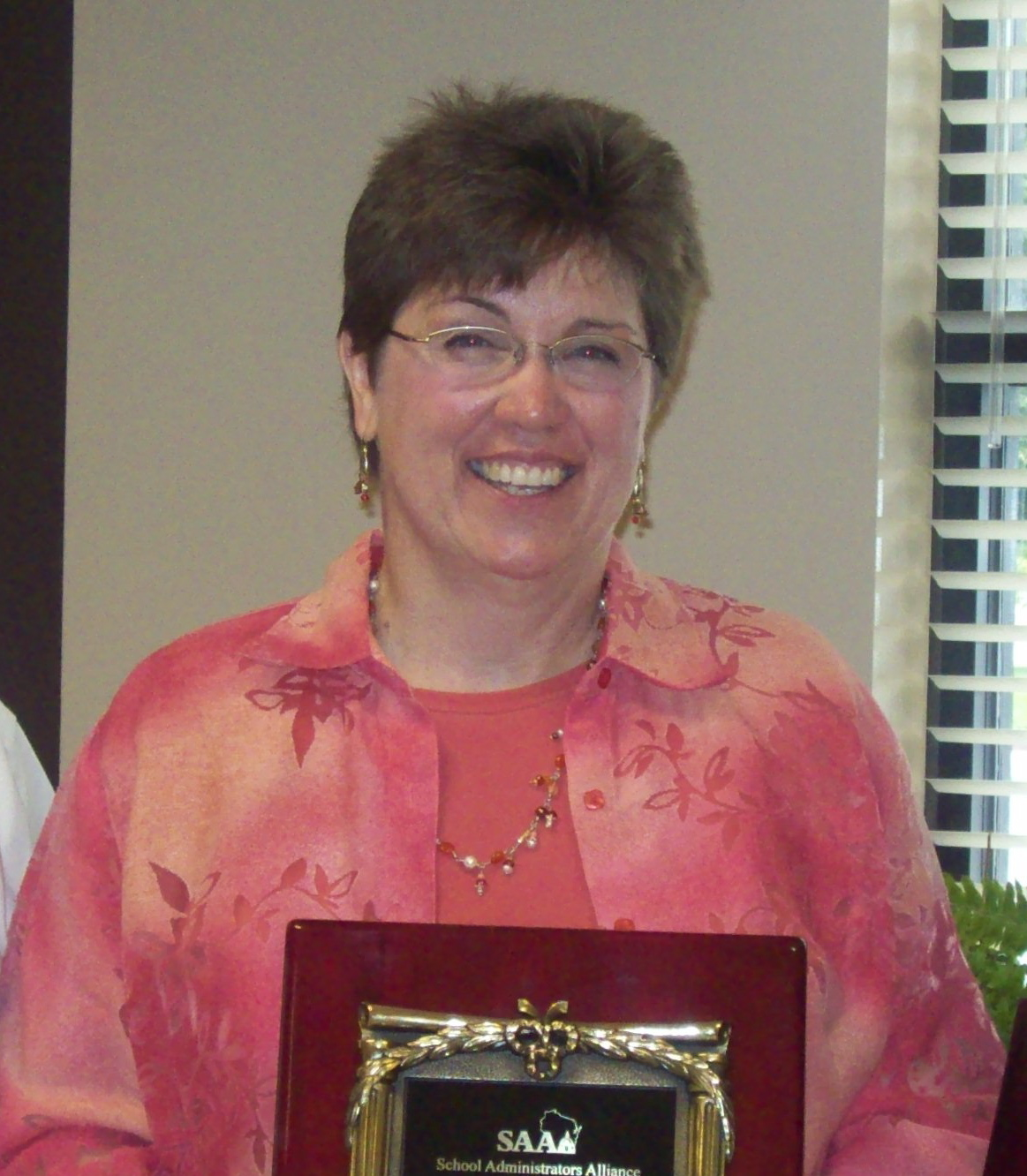

Member of the Wisconsin Senate from the 31st district
- In office January 3, 2007 – January 7, 2019
- Preceded by: Ron Brown
- Succeeded by: Jeff Smith

Personal details
- Born: June 16, 1958 (age 68) Albany, New York, U.S.
- Party: Democratic
- Spouse: Doug Kane
- Children: 1
- Education: Lincoln Land Community; College; Southern Illinois University Carbondale (BS); Saint Louis University (MPH, PhD)
- Website: Campaign Website

Kathleen Vinehout (born June 16, 1958) is a former Democratic member of the Wisconsin Senate, representing the 31st district since 2007. She was an unsuccessful primary candidate for Governor of Wisconsin in the 2012 recall election against Scott Walker as well as the 2018 election.

== Early life and education ==
Vinehout was born on June 16, 1958, in Albany, New York, and grew up in Aurora, Illinois. Her father was a laborer and her mother a registered nurse, and both served in the United States Air Force. She earned a Bachelor of Science degree in education from Southern Illinois University in 1980, a Master of Public Health from Saint Louis University in 1982, and a PhD in Health Services Research from Saint Louis University in 1987. She also received an associate degree in agriculture from the Lincoln Land Community College in 1992.

== Career ==
=== Academic ===
Vinehout directed both the graduate and undergraduate programs in health administration at the University of Illinois Springfield, serving for ten years. She was a member of the faculty and teaching in the Health Services Administration and Women’s Studies Programs. Her academic work focused on state health policy, the history of health care reform and health problems facing rural communities.

=== Family business ===
After working in academia, Vinehout worked as the primary operator of the family's fifty-cow dairy farm. The farm had a rolling herd average of 21,000 pounds of milk and received many quality milk awards. Vinehout's family farm in Alma is certified organic and produces hay and grain. Vinehout was president of the Dairy Herd Improvement Association in Buffalo County, Wisconsin, for several years and represented the district at statewide meetings. She also assisted the Wisconsin Farmers Union in agriculture and dairy policy and worked part-time in 2005 as an advocate at the state capitol for the Farmers Union. She served on the Buffalo County Agricultural Fair Association Board and the Buffalo County Farm Bureau Board. Vinehout was formerly a member of the Wisconsin Holstein Association and she and her family have shown cattle at district shows.

=== Wisconsin Senate ===
Vinehout was elected to the Wisconsin Senate in 2006, defeating Republican Incumbent Ron Brown. She was reelected in 2010 and 2014.

==== Committee assignments ====
In her first term, Vinehout chaired the Senate Committee on Agriculture and Higher Education and served as Co-Chair of the Joint Committee on Audit. She also served in a leadership position as Vice-chair of the Senate Democratic Caucus and as a member of the Economic Development; Children, Families and Work Force Development; Public Health, Senior Issues, Long Term Care and Job Creation Senate Committees.

Vinehout was the chair of the Democratic Party of Buffalo County and served on the Mississippi River Regional Planning Commission and the Alma Chamber of Commerce. In 2005, the Democratic Party of Wisconsin awarded her with the Eleanor Roosevelt Award for her work in grassroots organizing. On November 2, 2010, Vinehout was reelected to the Wisconsin Senate beating Ed Thompson. On November 9, 2010, with only 352 votes separating the two candidates, Thompson asked for a recount. On November 19, 2010, Thompson conceded the election to Vinehout.

==== 2011 Wisconsin protests ====
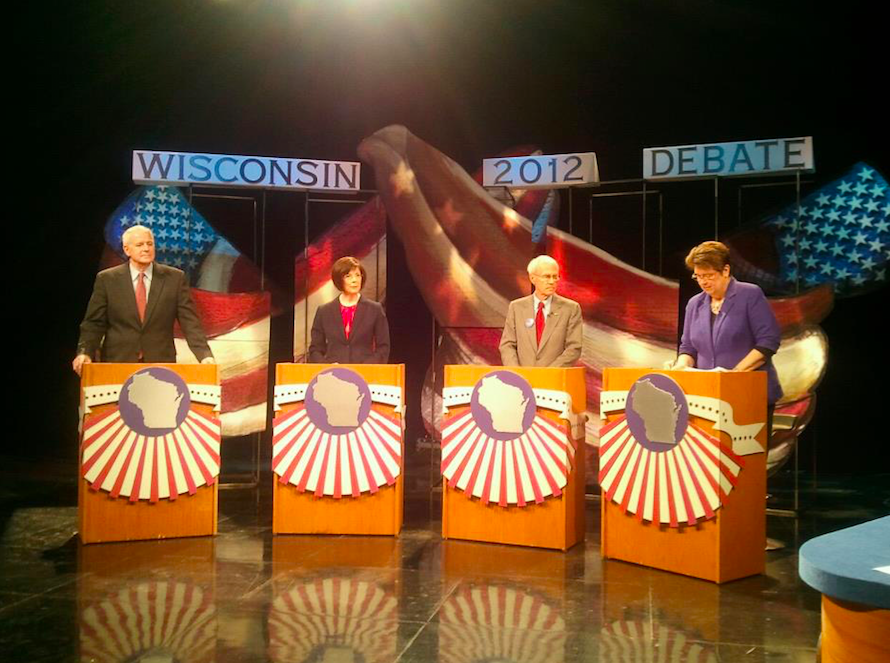
Four candidates (including Vinehout) at recall primary debate for Governor of Wisconsin, 2012

During the protests in Wisconsin, Vinehout, along with the 13 other Democratic State Senators, left the state to deny the State Senate a quorum on Governor Scott Walker's controversial "Budget Repair" legislation. She returned to the State of Wisconsin on March 12, 2011.

=== Wisconsin 2012 recall election ===
Vinehout was a candidate in the Democratic Primary during the 2012 Wisconsin Gubernatorial Recall Election. She garnered four percent of the vote, coming in third.

=== 2014 gubernatorial election ===
In January 2014, Senator Vinehout announced she would not run for Governor of Wisconsin because of injuries she received in a car accident in Racine County, Wisconsin, in December 2013.

=== 2018 gubernatorial election ===
In June 2017 Vinehout officially registered a committee for the 2018 Wisconsin governor election.

== Political positions ==
=== Health care ===
Sen. Vinehout describes fixing health care as a passion of hers. Before she was elected into the State Senate, her family was without health care for a couple years when her son required an emergency appendectomy.

She believes Wisconsin should accept the federal Medicaid expansion that current Governor Walker rejected. Doing so would cover 79,000 more people and give Wisconsin roughly $286 million in cash to spend. In her alternative budget, she puts this extra money towards mental health and substance abuse programs.

She favors creating a Wisconsin-based market-place for health care, which would keep coverage and prices in the state relatively stable even if funding from the federal government were to lag. It would also allow Wisconsin to offer BadgerCare as a public option.

=== Education ===
Vinehout believes that Wisconsin public schools need to be funded more by state money instead of property taxes and that the state needs to fix its school funding formula that representatives from both parties have described as "broken." On her website, she says that "Despite increases in the Governor's election-year budget, schools haven't recovered from the massive cuts in state aid in 2011. In real dollars, schools will be getting less in the next two years than a decade ago." In her alternative budget, she eliminates corporate tax breaks and cash payments and uses that money to pay for public education.

Her alternative budget also includes replacing the money current Governor Walker cut from the University of Wisconsin system over his eight years in office and investing an additional $100 million in needs-based financial aid.

She was also a member of the Wisconsin 14 who left the state to protest Governor Walker's contentious Act 10 bill that eliminated collective bargaining for teachers. She believes that Walker's actions disrespected school teachers and had a profoundly negative effect on Wisconsin's schools.

=== Environment ===
Vinehout favors having DNR run by an independent Secretary appointed by the Natural Resources Board rather than a Secretary appointed by the Governor. She has called for restoring funding of the Department of Natural Resources, rehiring scientists, seriously addressing the threat of climate change, and stronger environmental protections, especially of sand mines and CAFOs.

=== Economy ===
Sen. Vinehout has criticized the slow rate of growth under Gov. Scott Walker's policies. She believes state must create an environment in which the private sector thrives. The public sector should be focused on enriching the economic soil so that all plants can start and grow.

=== Local control ===
Vinehout states that the government must stop forcing local communities to accept policies and priorities that do not reflect local needs, conditions, or values. Local community decisions must be made by local residents.

=== Veterans ===
Vinehout wants to fix the management problems that are present in Wisconsin's Veterans homes. She wants to restore funding to veterans' programs including for homeless veterans (the Veteran Assistance Program) and the Assistance to Needy Veterans program that was cut by Governor Walker. She also believes it is necessary to restore the advisory organizations that have been disbanded, especially the Board of Veterans Affairs committees that deal with program review, legislation, long term care, and financing.

=== Racial equality ===
Vinehout insists on a $15 an hour minimum wage, changing Truth in Sentencing standards, offering treatment alternatives to prison, providing mental health services, improving inner city public schools, and expanding home ownership. She believes that President Obama's Task Force on 21st Century Policing holds the steps toward building trust between our citizens and law enforcement.

== Controversies ==
In 2009, Planned Parenthood revoked its endorsement of Kathleen when she authored an amendment to a reproductive rights bill that was designed to ensure access to birth control. Under the original bill, pharmacists would be required to fill prescriptions for abortion medication regardless of their religious beliefs. Sen. Vinehout claimed that such language violated the Wisconsin constitution, which states that no "control of, or interference with, the rights of conscience be permitted " and authored an amendment to the bill that allowed pharmacists to conscientiously object as long as they ensured that the patient would be able to receive the abortion drugs.

A bill very similar to the one Kathleen proposed passed in the Wisconsin state budget in 2010 with the backing of Planned Parenthood.

Vinehout considers herself pro-choice and believes that contraception should always be accessible and that abortions should be safe, legal, and rare.

In 2010 and 2014, Vinehout received an "A" rating from the NRA Political Victory Fund. However, she has disagreed with their policies on many occasions. She supports increased background checks, banning bump stocks, and a continuation of the ban on fully automatic weapons.

When speaking about gun issues, she has referenced her grandfather's death because of gun violence.

== Electoral history ==
=== Wisconsin Senate (2006–2014) ===
Year	Election	Date	Elected				Defeated				Total	Plurality
2006	Primary	Sep. 12	Kathleen Vinehout	Democratic	9,235	64.21%	Chris Danou	Dem.	5,143	35.76%	14,382	4,092
2006	General	Nov. 7	Kathleen Vinehout	Democratic	31,895	51.58%	Ron Brown (inc)	Rep.	29,890	48.33%	61,840	2,005
2010	General	Nov. 2	Kathleen Vinehout (inc)	Democratic	30,314	50.27%	Ed Thompson	Rep.	29,911	49.61%	60,298	403
2014	General	Nov. 4	Kathleen Vinehout (inc)	Democratic	35,508	52.32%	Mel Pittman	Rep.	32,317	47.62%	67,863	3,191

=== Wisconsin Governor (2012) ===
Year	Election	Date	Elected				Defeated				Total	Plurality
2012	Primary	May 8	Tom Barrett	Democratic	390,191	58.10%	Kathleen Falk	Dem.	229,236	34.13%	671,602	160,955
2012	Primary	May 8	Tom Barrett	Democratic	390,191	58.10%	Kathleen Vinehout	Dem.	26,967	4.02%	671,602	160,955
2012	Primary	May 8	Tom Barrett	Democratic	390,191	58.10%	Douglas La Follette	Dem.	19,497	2.90%	671,602	160,955
2012	Primary	May 8	Tom Barrett	Democratic	390,191	58.10%	Gladys Huber	Dem.	4,847	0.72%	671,602	160,955
2012	Primary	May 8	Tom Barrett	Democratic	390,191	58.10%	Scattering	Dem.	864	0.13%	671,602	160,955

=== Wisconsin Governor (2018) ===
Year	Election	Date	Elected				Defeated				Total	Plurality
2018	Primary	Aug. 14	Tony Evers	Democratic	225,082	41.77%	Mahlon Mitchell	Dem.	87,926	16.32%	538,857	137,156
2018	Primary	Aug. 14	Tony Evers	Democratic	225,082	41.77%	Kelda Roys	Dem.	69,086	12.82%	538,857	137,156
2018	Primary	Aug. 14	Tony Evers	Democratic	225,082	41.77%	Kathleen Vinehout	Dem.	44,168	8.20%	538,857	137,156
2018	Primary	Aug. 14	Tony Evers	Democratic	225,082	41.77%	Mike McCabe	Dem.	39,885	7.40%	538,857	137,156
2018	Primary	Aug. 14	Tony Evers	Democratic	225,082	41.77%	Matt Flynn	Dem.	31,580	5.86%	538,857	137,156
2018	Primary	Aug. 14	Tony Evers	Democratic	225,082	41.77%	Paul Soglin	Dem.	28,158	5.23%	538,857	137,156
2018	Primary	Aug. 14	Tony Evers	Democratic	225,082	41.77%	Andy Gronik (withdrawn)	Dem.	6,627	1.23%	538,857	137,156
2018	Primary	Aug. 14	Tony Evers	Democratic	225,082	41.77%	Dana Wachs (withdrawn)	Dem.	4,216	0.78%	538,857	137,156
2018	Primary	Aug. 14	Tony Evers	Democratic	225,082	41.77%	Josh Pade	Dem.	1,908	0.35%	538,857	137,156
2018	Primary	Aug. 14	Tony Evers	Democratic	225,082	41.77%	Paul Boucher (write-in)	Dem.	10	0.00%	538,857	137,156

== Personal life ==
Vinehout owns a farm with her husband, Doug, a former member of the Illinois House of Representatives and current member of the Board of Education in Alma. Her family operates a 223-acre (0.90 km^{2}) organic farm near Alma, Wisconsin. She owns a cat and a pair of horses. Doug and Kathleen have one son, Nathan, a graduate of Macalester College.
