= Allan Thompson (footballer) =

Australian rules footballer

Personal information
- Full name: Allan Theodore Thompson
- Born: 27 October 1910; Wodonga, Victoria
- Died: 21 January 1984 (aged 73); Cheltenham East, Victoria
- Original team: Prahran
- Height: 183 cm (6 ft 0 in)
- Weight: 83 kg (183 lb)

Playing career^{1}
Years	Club	Games (Goals)
1934–1936	Fitzroy	23 (23)
- ^{1} Playing statistics correct to the end of 1936.

Allan Theodore Thompson (27 October 1910 – 21 January 1984) was an Australian rules footballer who played for the Fitzroy Football Club in the Victorian Football League (VFL).
