= Alan Thomson (sportsman, born 1899) =

Australian sportsman

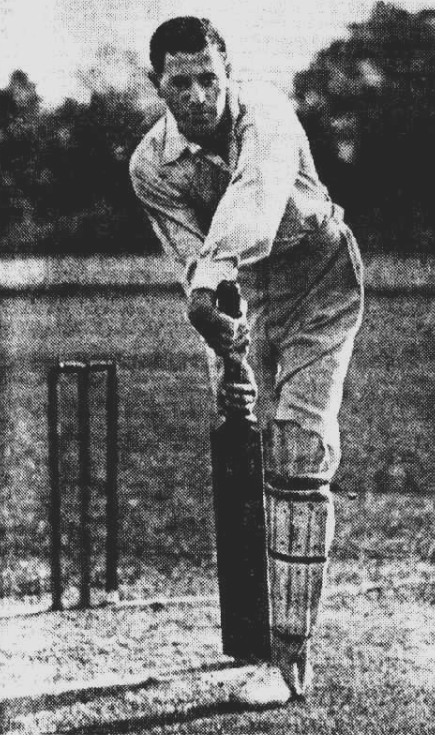

Personal information
- Born: 1 September 1899; Tibooburra, New South Wales, Australia
- Died: 15 September 1938 (aged 39); Tibooburra, New South Wales, Australia

Domestic team information
- Years: Team
- 1926: Victoria
- Source: Cricinfo, 21 November 2015

Alan Thomson (1 September 1899 – 15 September 1938) was an Australian sportsman. He played one first-class cricket match for Victoria in 1926. He also played Australian rules football for the St Kilda Football Club in the Victorian Football League (VFL).

== See also ==
- List of Victoria first-class cricketers
