= Allen Thompson =

Allen Thompson may refer to:

- Allen and James Thompson (1846–1906), soldiers and Medal of Honor recipients
- Allen C. Thompson (1906–1980), U.S. politician
- Allen Edwin Thompson (1855–1910), politician in Manitoba, Canada

== See also ==
- Allan Thompson (comics), fictional character from The Adventures of Tintin by Hergé
- Alan Thompson (disambiguation)
