= Alan Thompson (Australian footballer) =

Australian footballer

Personal information
- Full name: Alan Thompson
- Born: 20 November 1951 (age 74)
- Original team: South Warrnambool
- Height: 185 cm (6 ft 1 in)
- Weight: 78 kg (172 lb)
- Position: Wing

Playing career^{1}
Years	Club	Games (Goals)
1970–1979	Fitzroy	138 (59)
- ^{1} Playing statistics correct to the end of 1979.

Alan Thompson (born 20 November 1951) is a former Australian rules footballer who played for the Fitzroy Football Club in the Victorian Football League (VFL).
