= Herbert Thompson (Leicestershire cricketer) =

English cricketer

Herbert Thompson (14 May 1886 – 8 August 1941) played first-class cricket for Leicestershire between 1908 and 1910. He was born at Knighton, Leicester and died at Sevenoaks, Kent.

Thompson played as a middle-order right-handed batsman in 10 matches spread across three seasons. In his first game against Derbyshire in August 1908, he made a second innings of 72 and this remained by some distance his highest first-class cricket score. With William Odell he put on 95 in 80 minutes for the seventh wicket and it was this stand, said Wisden Cricketers' Almanack, "that saved the side", the match being left drawn. Thompson appeared in three more games in the 1908 season, five in 1909 and one in 1910 but in none of these games did he pass 30 runs in an innings.

His Wisden obituary in the 1942 edition of the Almanack refers to him as "Henry Thompson" and states that he was the honorary secretary of the Incogniti itinerant cricket team.
