= Dana Wachs =

21st century American politician

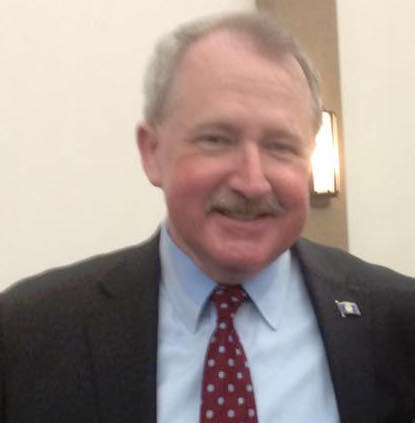

Member of the Wisconsin State Assembly from the 91st district
- In office January 7, 2013 – January 7, 2019
- Preceded by: Chris Danou
- Succeeded by: Jodi Emerson

Personal details
- Born: Dana John Wachs; August 25, 1957 (age 69) Eau Claire, Wisconsin, U.S.
- Party: Democratic
- Spouses: Tina L. Stewart (div. 1997); Beverly Wickstrom (m. 2000)
- Children: 3 with Tina Stewart
- Education: Marquette University (BA); Valparaiso University (JD)
- Profession: Lawyer

Dana John Wachs (born August 25, 1957) is an American lawyer and Democratic politician from Eau Claire, Wisconsin. He was a member of the Wisconsin State Assembly for six years, representing Wisconsin's 91st Assembly district from 2013 to 2019. He was also a member of the University of Wisconsin Board of Regents from 2022 until 2024. He previously served on the Eau Claire City Council. He was an unsuccessful candidate for Governor of Wisconsin in the 2018 Democratic primary.

== Early life and legal career ==
Born in Eau Claire, Wisconsin to Lucille (a teacher) and Ray Wachs (former Eau Claire City Attorney and City Manager), Wachs graduated from Eau Claire Memorial High School, Marquette University and received his J.D. degree from Valparaiso University School of Law.

Wachs has practiced law in Eau Claire for 30 years. He has achieved the highest rating, AV, by Martindale-Hubbell for legal ability and ethical standards. He has been named a Wisconsin Super Lawyer. He has also been recognized as one of the top lawyers in Wisconsin by Milwaukee Magazine and was named to the National “Top 100 Lawyers” list by the National Trial Lawyers Organization. Wachs is a member of the Wisconsin State Bar Association, the American Association for Justice, the Wisconsin Association for Justice, the American Bar Association and the National Trial Lawyer Organization. Wachs practices at Gingras, Thomsen & Wachs in Eau Claire.

As an attorney, Wachs has negotiated $6 million, $2.9 million, and $1 million settlements in separate medical malpractice cases. He also successfully argued before the Wisconsin Supreme Court for an expansion of medical malpractice law.

== Eau Claire City Council ==
Wachs served as a member of the Eau Claire City Council from 2009 to 2012. During his time on the City Council, Wachs served on the City/County Health Committee, Transit Commission, Affirmative Action Committee, Parks and Waterway Committee, Library Board, and Economic Policy Advisory Committee.

== Wisconsin State Assembly ==
In November 2012, Wachs was elected unopposed to the Wisconsin State Assembly as a Democrat. He was re-elected unopposed in 2014. In 2016, Wachs was elected to serve on the Credentials Committee at the Democratic National Convention.

During his first term in the Wisconsin State Assembly, Rep. Wachs served on the Assembly Committees on Colleges and Universities, Constitution and Ethics, Criminal Justice, Judiciary, and Workforce Development. He was also the Vice-Chair of the Legislative Council Study Committee on the Transfer of Structured Settlement Payments.

In 2013, Wachs introduced Assembly Bill Assembly Bill 51, the "Revolving Door" bill. This proposal would have prohibited any former legislator from working as a lobbyist for 24 months after they leave office. In 2014, he introduced Assembly Joint Resolution 80, which would have called for a statewide advisory referendum on whether or not Wisconsin should adopt a nonpartisan system of redistricting.

For the 2015 legislative session, Rep. Wachs served as the ranking Democratic member on the Assembly Committees on Judiciary and Colleges and Universities. He also served on the Constitution and Ethics Committee.

== Run for Governor ==
Wachs was one of ten declared candidates for the Democratic nomination for Governor of Wisconsin in 2018, but was the second to drop out, leaving the race in June and endorsing Tony Evers for the nomination.

== University of Wisconsin System Board of Regents ==
In 2022 Governor Evers appointed Wachs to the University of Wisconsin System Board of Regents.

In March 2024, on the last day of floor activity in the state Senate for the 106th Wisconsin Legislature, the Senate voted to reject Wachs' appointment to the board of regents. Senate Republicans explained their vote, saying that it was retaliation for Wachs voting against the funding deal offered by the Legislature in 2023, which required the University to gut DEI programs.

Wachs' removal was part of a historically unique situation in Wisconsin, in which Senate Republicans have wielded their confirmation power in an increasingly partisan and punitive manner against the two-term Democratic governor, Tony Evers. Since Evers took office, in January 2019, the Senate has rejected 21 of his appointments. In the prior 40 years, the Senate rejected only 4 gubernatorial appointees.

== Personal life ==
Wachs has three adult children with his first wife, Tina. He is currently married to Beverly Wickstrom.

== Electoral history ==
=== Wisconsin Assembly (2012–2016) ===
Year	Election	Date	Elected				Defeated				Total	Plurality
2012	General	Nov. 6	Dana Wachs	Democratic	23,030	97.28%	--Unopposed--				23,674	22,386
2014	General	Nov. 4	Dana Wachs (inc)	Democratic	14,686	96.97%	--Unopposed--				15,145	14,227
2016	General	Nov. 8	Dana Wachs (inc)	Democratic	17,780	60.87%	Bill Ingram	Rep.	11,341	38.82%	29,211	6,439

=== Wisconsin Governor (2018) ===
Year	Election	Date	Elected				Defeated				Total	Plurality
2018	Primary	Aug. 14	Tony Evers	Democratic	225,082	41.77%	Mahlon Mitchell	Dem.	87,926	16.32%	538,857	137,156
2018	Primary	Aug. 14	Tony Evers	Democratic	225,082	41.77%	Kelda Roys	Dem.	69,086	12.82%	538,857	137,156
2018	Primary	Aug. 14	Tony Evers	Democratic	225,082	41.77%	Kathleen Vinehout	Dem.	44,168	8.20%	538,857	137,156
2018	Primary	Aug. 14	Tony Evers	Democratic	225,082	41.77%	Mike McCabe	Dem.	39,885	7.40%	538,857	137,156
2018	Primary	Aug. 14	Tony Evers	Democratic	225,082	41.77%	Matt Flynn	Dem.	31,580	5.86%	538,857	137,156
2018	Primary	Aug. 14	Tony Evers	Democratic	225,082	41.77%	Paul Soglin	Dem.	28,158	5.23%	538,857	137,156
2018	Primary	Aug. 14	Tony Evers	Democratic	225,082	41.77%	Andy Gronik (withdrawn)	Dem.	6,627	1.23%	538,857	137,156
2018	Primary	Aug. 14	Tony Evers	Democratic	225,082	41.77%	Dana Wachs (withdrawn)	Dem.	4,216	0.78%	538,857	137,156
2018	Primary	Aug. 14	Tony Evers	Democratic	225,082	41.77%	Josh Pade	Dem.	1,908	0.35%	538,857	137,156
2018	Primary	Aug. 14	Tony Evers	Democratic	225,082	41.77%	Paul Boucher (write-in)	Dem.	10	0.00%	538,857	137,156
