= Ernesto Chacon =

Ernesto Chacon (born 1938), a Texas native, has served as president and director of the Federation for Civic Action, a Latino and low-income civil rights organization based in Milwaukee, Wisconsin, since 1989.

He is a former director and president of the Latin American Union for Civil Rights (LAUCR) in Milwaukee, and helped organize the protests which led to the Spanish Speaking Outreach Institute at the University of Wisconsin–Milwaukee.

Chacon has worked for the National Association of Government Employees and as a labor consultant in San Antonio, Texas. He also served on the Committee of the United Farm Workers of America in California, worked as a consultant with National Council of La Raza in Washington, D.C., and co-founded Milwaukee's Mexican Fiesta in 1977.

A recipient of the United Migrant Opportunity Services (UMOS) Lifetime Achievement Award and the Spanish Times Latino Leader of the Year, he is a member of Stop Latino on Latino Violence and the Committees on Civil Rights and Better Education.

Chacon and his wife Lutecia Gonzalez have six adult children and live in Milwaukee. He is employed by the Milwaukee Office of Governor Jim Doyle of Wisconsin.
