= Albert G. Thompson =

American educator and philanthropist (1928 – 2016)

Coordinates: 14°32′13″N 90°46′16.6″W

Albert Gray Thompson (Dec 5, 1928 – May 29, 2016) was an American educator and philanthropist. He spent the bulk of his academic career at Marquette University, although he also spent several years teaching and researching in Central America. After his retirement in 1988, he and his wife established a small coffee plantation outside Antigua Guatemala. They used the plantation as an educational tool, a fund-raising project (to provide scholarships and employment for local youth), and a tourist destination.

== Finca Los Nietos ==
At his 1988 retirement from Marquette University, Thompson and his wife traveled to the small town of San Lorenzo de Cubo, 7 km southwest of Antigua Guatemala. They reclaimed a patch of mountainous land which had been used as a trash dump, and turned it into a coffee-producing tract. They created small artisanal bags of coffee, selling them to shops in town, shipping them to the States, and giving tours to tourists. They became a cherished part of their small community, sent many Guatemalan girls to school, employed the local teens, became part of the community, and were considered family by many of the locals. In addition to his work on the coffee plantation, Thompson painted, explored silversmithing, and designed the house that they had built on the plantation. He became a self-taught expert on the local fauna, and cultivated several species of orchids.

By 2003 their small plantation boasted 2000 coffee trees, with an annual production of 400 lb (180 kg) of red coffee beans. They also purchased neighbors' crops, and provided a roasted product for market. They sought ways to "localize" their product, bagging their coffee with local weavings, making and affixing small hand-made dolls on the bag cincture, and hiring a woman to hand-dip coffee beans (as well as peanuts and pretzels) in chocolate.

In addition to growing and processing coffee, the Finca became a small cultural center. Beginning in 1996, visitors were invited to enjoy Dr. Thompson's "coffee class". They learned of soil composition, harvesting, processing and roasting coffee; observed the art of orchid growing; and toured gardens with over 150 different flowers, bushes and trees. By 2003, some 4000 visitors had been logged at the center.

In 2008 the project was sold to a Cuban-American family, Raúl and Christina Keilt. The new owners built on the foundation provided by the two decades of effort from the Thompsons, continuing the plantation's reputation as a combination resort/tourist-education site.

== Scholarships ==
In nearby San Antonio Aguas Calientes is the Hermano Pedro Catholic School (K-9th grades). The Thompsons spearheaded a scholarship fund for students, that was used to support 8 girls each year in the school. They also worked with donors from the States to construct a carpentry shop classroom at the school.

== Published works ==
- Detours: From Classrooms to a Guatemalan Coffee Farm (2003)

== Personal ==
Thompson married Carolyn. They had five children.
