= Ed Thompson (Wisconsin politician) =

American businessman and politician (1944–2011)

Mayor of Tomah
- In office April 15, 2008 – April 20, 2010
- Preceded by: Charles Ludeking
- Succeeded by: John Rusch
- In office April 2000 – April 2002
- Preceded by: Bud Johnson
- Succeeded by: Charles Ludeking

Personal details
- Born: Allan Edward Thompson; December 25, 1944 Elroy, Wisconsin, U.S.
- Died: October 22, 2011 (aged 66) Tomah, Wisconsin, U.S.
- Party: Libertarian
- Other political affiliations: Republican
- Spouse: Kathy Nelson
- Children: 4
- Relatives: Tommy Thompson (brother)
- Education: UW-Madison

Allan Edward Thompson (December 25, 1944 – October 22, 2011) was an American businessman and politician. He served as Mayor of Tomah, Wisconsin for two non-consecutive terms, and was the Libertarian candidate for Governor of Wisconsin in 2002, receiving nearly 11% of the vote in that race. His older brother, Tommy Thompson, was the 42nd governor of Wisconsin.

== Early life, education, and business career ==
Thompson was born in Elroy, Wisconsin. His mother, Julie (née Dutton), was a teacher, and his father, Allan Thompson, owned and ran a gas station and country grocery store. A graduate of Royall High School in 1963, he was active in the drama department and competed in football, basketball, and track. Ed was the younger brother of Tommy Thompson. After high school, Ed briefly attended the University of Wisconsin–Madison before enlisting in the U.S. Navy during the Vietnam War. After being honorably discharged from the Navy, he married Kathy Nelson; the couple settled in Elroy and had four children: Ann Marie, Kristin Beth, Allan Edward “Chip” Thompson, and Joshua Thompson.

Thompson was the owner of the Tee-Pee supper club, a restaurant in Tomah, and was the subject of the documentary A Remarkable Man. His older brother, Tommy Thompson, a Republican, was formerly Governor of Wisconsin and United States Secretary of Health and Human Services.

== Political experience ==
=== Tomah politics ===
In 2000, he defeated incumbent mayor Bud Johnson with 57% of the vote. He served only one two-year term.

On April 5, 2005, Thompson won an unexpected victory in the common council election in Tomah. Thompson was not running for the position but was, unknown to him, the subject of a write-in campaign. He received 31 of 34 votes. His "opponent", John Buick, received one vote from Thompson himself. Thompson initially declined to accept the position, but later reconsidered. He was sworn in on April 15, 2005, and served two years on the Tomah common council.

In 2008, Thompson took the place of outgoing mayor Ludeking, whom he defeated in the mayoral election on April 1 by nearly a 2–1 margin. Thompson was sworn into office for his second (non-consecutive) two-year term as mayor of Tomah on April 15, 2008.

=== 2002 gubernatorial campaign ===
Thompson became the Libertarian party nominee in April and ran against Democrat Jim Doyle, the state Attorney General, and incumbent Republican Governor Scott McCallum, the former Lieutenant Governor who had assumed the office in 2001 after Governor Tommy Thompson left to become U.S. Secretary of Health and Human Services.

The 2002 governor's race is considered by some to have been the most negative campaign in the state's history. In response Thompson, publicly critical of the negative campaigning of both major party candidates, became a more viable option for some voters, and garnered 10% of the vote. Doyle won the election with a plurality of 45% of the vote, becoming the state's first Democratic governor since Anthony Earl was defeated in 1986. Doyle was sworn in on January 6, 2003 at the State Capitol in Madison.

=== 2010 State Senate campaign ===
Thompson announced in October 2009 that he would run as a Republican for the 31st district Wisconsin State Senate seat in 2010, against incumbent Kathleen Vinehout. The 31st District included all of Trempealeau, Buffalo, Jackson and Pepin counties, and parts of Monroe, Pierce, Dunn, Eau Claire and Clark counties. On November 2, 2010, Vinehout defeated Thompson, who was still campaigning for the office, despite being recently diagnosed with pancreatic cancer in September 2010. On November 9, 2010, he requested a recount with only 352 votes separating Thompson from Vinehout. On November 19, 2010, he conceded the election to Vinehout.

=== Death ===
Thompson died of pancreatic cancer on October 22, 2011, in Tomah.

== Electoral history ==
=== Wisconsin Governor (2002) ===
Wisconsin Gubernatorial Election 2002
Party	Candidate	Votes	%	±%
Democratic	Jim Doyle	800,515	45.1	
Republican	Scott McCallum (incumbent)	734,779	41.4	
Libertarian	Ed Thompson	185,455	10.5	

=== Tomah Mayor (2008) ===
- Ed Thompson (L), 66%
- Charles Ludeking (Independent) (Inc.), 34%

=== Wisconsin Senate (2010) ===
- Kathleen Vinehout (D) (Inc.), 50.3%
- Ed Thompson (R), 49.6%

Party political offices
Preceded by Jim Mueller	Libertarian nominee for Governor of Wisconsin; 2002	Vacant Title next held by Terry Virgil
