= Edward J. Zore =

American CEO

- Born: 1945 (age 80–81); Milwaukee, Wisconsin
- Education: UW–Milwaukee, BA, MA
- Occupations: Chairman and former CEO of Northwestern Mutual
- Spouse: Married
- Children: 2

Edward J. Zore (born 1945) is the former president and CEO of Northwestern Mutual and current chairman. He became Northwestern Mutual's 16th president on March 31, 2000 and chief executive officer on June 1, 2001. Zore joined Northwestern Mutual investment department in 1969. He served as the company's Executive Vice President, Chief Financial Officer, Chief Investment Officer and trustee of Northwestern Mutual. He was inducted as an honoree of the SMEI Academy of Achievement in 2003, and was named among the 100 most influential people in business ethics in 2008. Zore retired from Northwestern Mutual CEO on June 30, 2010. He was succeeded by John Schlifske.

He is a former chairman of the board of the American Council of Life Insurers and an honorary board member of the Million Dollar Round Table Foundation. Additionally, he serves as an advisory board member of the Millstein Center for Corporate Governance and Performance at the Yale School of Management.

Zore obtained his B.A. and M.A. in Economics from the University of Wisconsin–Milwaukee.
