= Herbert Thompson (Surrey cricketer) =

English cricketer

Herbert Thompson (6 December 1869 – 22 October 1947) was an English first-class cricketer active 1894–1919 who played for Surrey. He was born in West Norwood; died in Caterham.
