= Progressive Dane =

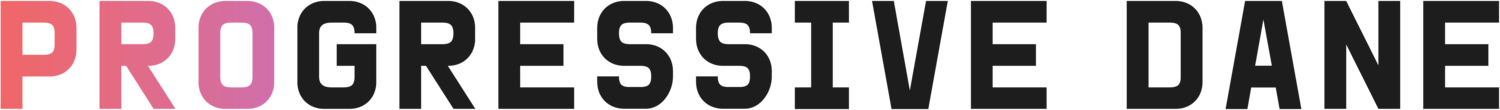
- Abbreviation: ProDane or PD
- Co-Chair: Brenda Konkel
- Treasurer: Martha Kemble
- Founded: 1992; 34 years ago
- Preceded by: Citizens Party
- Ideology: Progressivism
- Political position: Center-left to left-wing
- National affiliation: New Party (until 1998)
- Madison Common Council: 6 / 20
- Dane County Board of Supervisors: 7 / 37
- Madison School Board: 5 / 7

Website
- www.prodane.org

Progressive Dane (ProDane or PD) is a progressive political party in Dane County, Wisconsin. ProDane formed in fall 1992 as a chapter of the New Party, which dissolved in 1998.

ProDane focuses near-exclusively on local elections. ProDane routinely wins seats on the Dane County Board of Supervisors, the Madison Common Council, the Mayor of Madison the Madison Metropolitan School District Board of Education, and the Fitchburg Common Council.

All of these entities have non-partisan elections, with no party primaries and no party names on ballots. Thus, while Progressive Dane organizes itself as a political party, and attempts to elect ProDane candidates, its candidates can also be endorsed by the Democrats and/or Greens. In some elections, ProDane has worked with Democrats and with Greens. This is similar to the electoral fusion strategy of the New Party and the Richmond Progressive Alliance.

ProDane holds regular Progressive Caucus meetings with its elected officials.

Notable elected officials include former mayor Dave Cieslewicz and incumbent mayor Satya Rhodes-Conway.

== History ==
In the 1990s, ProDane ran candidates for the state legislature and for statewide offices. However, these attempts were unsuccessful. Instead, focusing on local elections, by 1997 ProDane had grown strong enough to be the 2nd-largest party, after the Democrats, in Dane County.

Progressive Dane achieved a high level of electoral success in the early 2000s. In 2001, John Nichols said ProDane "may well be the most successful homegrown political party in the United States". In 2005, Madison mayor and Progressive Dane member Dave Cieslewicz remarked, "For all intents and purposes, they are the [city’s] governing party right now." In this period, ProDane raised the Madison minimum wage and passed a sexuality non-discrimination ordinance.

In 2004, in response to the success of ProDane and ProDane's endorsement of a Green candidate for Dane County Treasurer, the Democratic Party of Dane County began making explicit endorsements in Dane elections and running liberal Democrats against ProDane candidates.

In 2006, ProDane endorsed a "NO" vote on Referendum 1, which would have invalidated same-sex marriages.

== Ideology ==
Progressive Dane has a city, county, and education party platform. Last revised in 2025, Progressive Dane's county platform supports many progressive policies, including: equitable economic development, criminal justice reform, and response to climate change. Last revised in 2024, ProDane's city platform includes: open and democratic government, housing justice, community policing, quality healthcare, and employee rights. ProDane's education platform contains principles and areas of priority including support for: public school funding, labor rights, equity and inclusion, Social–emotional learning, and community schools.

Endorsed elected officials are expected to vote in accordance with the party's platform and pre-emptively disclose any anticipated votes which are contrary to the party's platform. An elected official may be removed from the ProDane's caucus for taking actions contrary to the party's platform or non-communication with the party.

== Electoral history ==
The table below shows the number of ProDane elected officials. Madison and Fitchburg offices are elected in odd years in April (shown below), Dane County offices in even years, and School Board on both:

Year	Dane County Board of Supervisors	Madison Common Council	Mayor of Madison	Madison School Board	Fitchburg Common Council	Refs
2001	6 / 37	7 / 20	did not control	3 / 7	0 / 8	
2003	7 / 37	6 / 20	Dave Cieslewicz	2 / 7	0 / 8	
2005	5 / 37	7 / 20	Dave Cieslewicz	3 / 7	0 / 8	
2007	6 / 37	6 / 20	did not control	3 / 7	0 / 8	
2009	5 / 37	3 / 20	did not control	4 / 7	0 / 8	
2011	4 / 37	4 / 20	did not control	3 / 7	1 / 8	
2013	5 / 37	3 / 20	did not control	4 / 7	0 / 8	
2015	7 / 37	3 / 20	did not control	3 / 7	0 / 8	
2017	6 / 37	5 / 20	did not control	2 / 7	1 / 8	
2019	3 / 37	7 / 20	Satya Rhodes-Conway	2 / 7	0 / 8	
2021	3 / 37	7 / 20	Satya Rhodes-Conway	2 / 7	0 / 8	
2023	4 / 37	7 / 20	Satya Rhodes-Conway	1 / 7	0 / 8	
2024	5 / 37	7 / 20	Satya Rhodes-Conway	0 / 7	0 / 8	
2026	7 / 37	6 / 20	Satya Rhodes-Conway	5 / 7	0 / 8	

In the 2003 mayoral election, ProDane endorsed Green and Socialist candidate Bert Zipperer in the first round, who lost. Mayor Dave Cieslewicz was a member of ProDane from 2003 to 2005, but not 2007 or 2009.

== Election results ==
ProDane has endorsed electoral candidates for local, state, and federal offices. The vast majority of ProDane candidates ran for nonpartisan local offices. State and federal candidates usually run as Green Party candidates.

ProDane has won many local offices, but never a state legislature, statewide, or federal office.

=== Federal elections ===
In 2000, ProDane endorsed Green candidate Ralph Nader for president. In 2006, ProDane endorsed Green candidate Rae Vogler for Senate.

=== State legislature elections ===
Year	Candidate	Office	State	District	Votes	%	Result	Notes	Ref
2010	Ben Manski	Assembly	Wisconsin	77	7,762	31.08%	Lost	ran as Green candidate	

=== Local elections ===
Year	Candidate	Office	City	District	Votes	%	Result	Notes	Ref
2023	Satya Rhodes	Mayor	Madison	At-Large	63,078	55.2%	Won	nonpartisan election	
2023	John Duncan	Common Council	Madison	1	4,540	98.7%	Won	nonpartisan election, unopposed	
2023	Julianna Bennett	Common Council	Madison	2	2,767	71.7%	Won	nonpartisan election	
2023	Mike Verveer	Common Council	Madison	4	2,356	53.0%	Won	nonpartisan election	
2023	Marsha Rummel	Common Council	Madison	6	3,870	55.8%	Won	nonpartisan election	
2023	MGR Govindarajan	Common Council	Madison	8	2,305	50.9%	Won	nonpartisan election	
2023	Nikki Conklin	Common Council	Madison	9	2,667	53.8%	Won	nonpartisan election	
2023	Yannette Figueroa Cole	Common Council	Madison	10	2,684	50.4%	Won	nonpartisan election	
2023	Julia Matthews	Common Council	Madison	12	2,402	42.8%	Lost	nonpartisan election	
2023	Noah Lieberman	Common Council	Madison	14	1,384	49.7%	Lost	nonpartisan election	
2023	Michelle Ellinger Linley	Common Council	Madison	18	1,753	33.8%	Won	nonpartisan election	
2022	Heidi Wegleitner	Board of Supervisors	Dane County	2	1,784	98.6%	Won	nonpartisan election, unopposed	
2022	Yogesh Chawla	Board of Supervisors	Dane County	6	2,403	99.2%	Won	nonpartisan election, unopposed	
2022	Jacob Wright	Board of Supervisors	Dane County	17	1,841	98.7%	Won	nonpartisan election, unopposed	
2022	Kierstin Huelsemann	Board of Supervisors	Dane County	27	1,033	98.0%	Won	nonpartisan election, unopposed	
2021	Patrick Heck	Common Council	Madison	2	1,613	61.8%	Won	nonpartisan election	
2021	Benji Ramirez	Common Council	Madison	2	987	37.8%	Lost	nonpartisan election	
2021	Charly Rowe	Common Council	Madison	3	648	23.4%	Lost	nonpartisan election	
2021	Mike Verveer	Common Council	Madison	4	1,502	97.8%	Won	nonpartisan election, unopposed	
2021	Ayomi Obuseh	Common Council	Madison	8	162	33.6%	Lost	nonpartisan election	
2021	Juliana Bennet	Common Council	Madison	8	317	65.8%	Won	nonpartisan election	
2021	Nikki Conklin	Common Council	Madison	9	2,058	55.7%	Won	nonpartisan election	
2021	Yannette Figueroa Cole	Common Council	Madison	10	2,030	58.5%	Won	nonpartisan election	
2021	Tessa Echeverria	Common Council	Madison	12	716	24.3%	Lost	nonpartisan election	
2021	Tag Evers	Common Council	Madison	13	2,773	81.0%	Won	nonpartisan election	
2021	Grant Foster	Common Council	Madison	15	2,009	96.8%	Won	nonpartisan election, unopposed	
2021	Rebecca Kemble	Common Council	Madison	18	1,380	45.2%	Lost	nonpartisan election	
2021	Aisha Moe	Common Council	Madison	19	1,288	35.7%	Lost	nonpartisan election	
2021	Goodwill Obieze	Board of Supervisors	Dane County	12	192	13.6%	Lost	nonpartisan election, did not advance to top-two general	
2020	Heidi Wegleitner	Board of Supervisors	Dane County	2	4,615	98.9%	Won	nonpartisan election, unopposed	
2020	Richard Kilmer	Board of Supervisors	Dane County	4	3,249	99.2%	Won	nonpartisan election, unopposed	
2020	Yogesh Chawla	Board of Supervisors	Dane County	6	5,889	99.2%	Won	nonpartisan election, unopposed	
2020	José Eladio Rea	Board of Supervisors	Dane County	5	745	44.9%	Lost	nonpartisan election	
2020	Savion Castro	Madison School Board	Madison	2	67,557	99.1%	Won	nonpartisan election, unopposed	
2020	Wayne Strong	Madison School Board	Madison	7	31,533	39.4%	Lost	nonpartisan election	
2020	Max Prestigiacomo	Common Council	Madison	8	1,318	98.7%	Won	nonpartisan election, unopposed	
2019	Ali Muldrow	Madison School Board	Madison	4	48,975	69.3%	Won	nonpartisan election	
2019	Ananda Mirilli	Madison School Board	Madison	5	38,214	57.6%	Won	nonpartisan election	
2019	Satya Rhodes	Mayor	Madison	At-Large	47,915	61.9%	Won	nonpartisan election	
2019	Patrick Heck	Common Council	Madison	2	2,670	73.1%	Won	nonpartisan election	
2019	Mike Verveer	Common Council	Madison	4	2,724	97.8%	Won	nonpartisan election, unopposed	
2019	Marsha Rummel	Common Council	Madison	6	4,462	97.8%	Won	nonpartisan election, unopposed	
2019	Badri Lankella	Common Council	Madison	7	1,166	43.1%	Lost	nonpartisan election	
2019	Matthew Mitnick	Common Council	Madison	8	735	44.4%	Lost	nonpartisan election	
2019	Diane Farsetta	Common Council	Madison	12	1,749	47.1%	Lost	nonpartisan election	
2019	Tag Evers	Common Council	Madison	13	2,953	62.5%	Won	nonpartisan election	
2019	Grant Foster	Common Council	Madison	15	1,771	53.1%	Won	nonpartisan election	
2019	Samba Baldeh	Common Council	Madison	17	1,898	75.3%	Won	nonpartisan election	
2019	Rebecca Kemble	Common Council	Madison	18	2,806	98.6%	Won	nonpartisan election, unopposed	
2019	Keith Furman	Common Council	Madison	19	2,189	51.1%	Won	nonpartisan election	
2019	Christian Albouras	Common Council	Madison	20	2,005	68.8%	Won	nonpartisan election, unopposed	
2018	Anna Moffit	Madison School Board	Madison	1	27,644	46.9%	Lost	nonpartisan election	
2018	Heidi Wegleitner	Board of Supervisors	Dane County	2	3,263	98.6%	Won	nonpartisan election, unopposed	
2018	Richard Kilmer	Board of Supervisors	Dane County	4	2,487	98.8%	Won	nonpartisan election, unopposed	
2018	Yogesh Chawla	Board of Supervisors	Dane County	6	3,014	52.6%	Won	nonpartisan election	
2018	Al Matano	Board of Supervisors	Dane County	11	2,397	47.0%	Lost	nonpartisan election	
2018	Tanya Buckingham	Board of Supervisors	Dane County	24	2,329	63.4%	Won	nonpartisan election	
2017	Ledell Zellers	Common Council	Madison	2	1,948	98.3%	Won	nonpartisan election, uncontested	
2017	Mike Verveer	Common Council	Madison	4	1,470	98.7%	Won	nonpartisan election, uncontested	
2017	Marsha Rummel	Common Council	Madison	6	3,239	97.9%	Won	nonpartisan election, uncontested	
2017	Bradley Campbell	Common Council	Madison	11	1,407	39.9%	Lost	nonpartisan election	
2017	Samba Baldeh	Common Council	Madison	17	1,179	98.2%	Won	nonpartisan election, uncontested	
2017	Rebecca Kemble	Common Council	Madison	18	1,647	98.4%	Won	nonpartisan election, uncontested	
2017	Steve Arnold	Mayor	Fitchburg	At-Large	2,221	41.4%	Lost	nonpartisan election	
2017	Dorothy Krause	Common Council	Fitchburg	1-1	412	54.1%	Won	nonpartisan election	
2017	Wanda McCann	Common Council	Fitchburg	1-2	369	47.8%	Lost	nonpartisan election	
2017	Linda Brewer	Common Council	Fitchburg	2-4	568	43.7%	Lost	nonpartisan election	
2017	Jay Allen	Common Council	Fitchburg	3-5	377	43.5%	Lost	nonpartisan election	
2017	Ali Muldrow	Madison School Board	Madison	6	20,536	44.1%	Lost	nonpartisan election	
2017	Chris Carusi	Madison School Board	Madison	6	10,670	28.9%	Lost	nonpartisan election, lost in primary	
2017	Nicki Vander Meulen	Madison School Board	Madison	7	29,028	68.3%	Won	nonpartisan election	
2017	Matt Andrzejewski	Madison School Board	Madison	7	8,700	24.2%	Lost	nonpartisan election, lost in primary	
2016	Rob Franklin	Board of Supervisors	Dane County	1	1,451	28.6%	Lost	nonpartisan election, top-two general	
2016	Adam Brabender	Board of Supervisors	Dane County	1	174	12.2%	Lost	nonpartisan election, did not advance to top-two general	
2016	Heidi Wegleitner	Board of Supervisors	Dane County	2	4,196	97.8%	Won	nonpartisan election, unopposed	
2016	Richard Kilmer	Board of Supervisors	Dane County	4	3,137	98.6%	Won	nonpartisan election, unopposed	
2016	Angelito Tenorio	Board of Supervisors	Dane County	5	1,723	36.7%	Lost	nonpartisan election	
2016	John Hendrick	Board of Supervisors	Dane County	6	4,480	98.6%	Won	nonpartisan election, unopposed	
2016	Al Matano	Board of Supervisors	Dane County	11	4,055	99.1%	Won	nonpartisan election, unopposed	
2016	Michele Ritt	Board of Supervisors	Dane County	18	3,292	66.8%	Won	nonpartisan election	
2016	Dorothy Krause	Board of Supervisors	Dane County	27	1,997	96.9%	Won	nonpartisan election, unopposed	
2016	Dean Loumos	Madison School Board	Madison	3	68,529	98.9%	Won	nonpartisan election, unopposed	
2016	T.J. Mertz	Madison School Board	Madison	5	67,948	98.8%	Won	nonpartisan election, unopposed	
2015	Barbara McKinney	Common Council	Madison	1	999	64.1%	Won	nonpartisan election	
2015	Ledell Zellers	Common Council	Madison	2	0	100%	Won	nonpartisan election, unopposed	
2015	Mike Verveer	Common Council	Madison	4	0	100%	Won	nonpartisan election, unopposed	
2015	Marsha Rummel	Common Council	Madison	6	0	100%	Won	nonpartisan election, unopposed	
2015	Zach Madden	Common Council	Madison	13	1,399	43.0%	Won	nonpartisan election	
2015	David Ahrens	Common Council	Madison	15	0	100%	Won	nonpartisan election, unopposed	
2015	Samba Baldeh	Common Council	Madison	17	1,004	50.6%	Won	nonpartisan election	
2015	Rebecca Kemble	Common Council	Madison	18	1,710	55.5%	Won	nonpartisan election, opponent was Her	
2015	Peng Her	Common Council	Madison	18	1,367	44.4%	Lost	nonpartisan election, opponent was Kemble	
2015	Steve Arnold	Mayor	Fitchburg	At-Large	2,517	50.7%	Won	nonpartisan election	
2015	Michael Childers	Common Council	Fitchburg	1-2	255	40.0%	Lost	nonpartisan election	
2015	Dorothy Krause	Common Council	Fitchburg	1-1	0	100%	Won	nonpartisan election, unopposed	
2015	Roger Backes	Common Council	Fitchburg	2-5	606	39.1%	Lost	nonpartisan election	
2015	Zyronia Mims	Common Council	Fitchburg	3-6	305	39.4%	Lost	nonpartisan election	
2015	Jake Johnson	Common Council	Fitchburg	4-7	0	100%	Won	nonpartisan election, unopposed	
2015	Anna Moffit	Madison School Board	Madison	1	0	100%	Won	nonpartisan election, unopposed	
2014	Heidi Wegleitner	Board of Supervisors	Dane County	2	0	100%	Won	nonpartisan election, unopposed	
2014	Kyle Richmond	Board of Supervisors	Dane County	4	0	100%	Won	nonpartisan election, unopposed	
2014	Leland Pan	Board of Supervisors	Dane County	5	279	54.7%	Won	nonpartisan election	
2014	John Hendrick	Board of Supervisors	Dane County	6	0	100%	Won	nonpartisan election, unopposed	
2014	Al Matano	Board of Supervisors	Dane County	11	0	100%	Won	nonpartisan election, unopposed	
2014	Michele Ritt	Board of Supervisors	Dane County	18	0	100%	Won	nonpartisan election, unopposed	
2014	Dorothy Krause	Board of Supervisors	Dane County	27	528	58.1%	Won	nonpartisan election	
2013	Ledell Zellers	Common Council	Madison	2	1,074	51.7%	Won	nonpartisan election	
2013	Barbara Davis	Common Council	Madison	3	872	39.6%	Lost	nonpartisan election	
2013	Mike Verveer	Common Council	Madison	4	0	100%	Won	nonpartisan election, unopposed	
2013	Marsha Rummel	Common Council	Madison	6	2,588	70.2%	Won	nonpartisan election	
2013	Leslie Peterson	Common Council	Madison	12	920	39.9%	Lost	nonpartisan election	
2013	Zach Madden	Common Council	Madison	13	1,077	38.9%	Lost	nonpartisan election	
2013	Hawk Sullivan	Common Council	Madison	15	1,024	45.9%	Lost	nonpartisan election	
2013	Dean Loumos	Madison School Board	Madison	3	18,286	50.2%	Won	nonpartisan election	
2013	TJ Mertz	Madison School Board	Madison	5	22,889	64.9%	Won	nonpartisan election	
2012	Heidi Wegleitner	Board of Supervisors	Dane County	2	1038	72.68%	Won	nonpartisan election	
2012	Kyle Richmond	Board of Supervisors	Dane County	4	0	100%	Won	nonpartisan election, unopposed	
2012	Leland Pan	Board of Supervisors	Dane County	5	212	54.63%	Won	nonpartisan election	
2012	John Hendrick	Board of Supervisors	Dane County	6	0	100%	Won	nonpartisan election, unopposed	
2012	Al Matano	Board of Supervisors	Dane County	11	0	100%	Won	nonpartisan election, unopposed	
2012	Arlene Silveira	Madison School Board	Madison	1	27,966	65.15%	Won	nonpartisan election	
2012	Michael Flores	Madison School Board	Madison	2	17,417	39.34%	Lost	nonpartisan election	
2011	Samuel Stevenson	Common Council	Madison	2	1,850	47.80%	Lost	nonpartisan election	
2011	Michael Verveer	Common Council	Madison	4	0	100%	Won	nonpartisan election, unopposed	
2011	Marsha Rummel	Common Council	Madison	6	4,026	71.00%	Won	nonpartisan election	
2011	Kyle Szarzynski	Common Council	Madison	8	880	42.30%	Lost	nonpartisan election	
2011	Brian Solomon	Common Council	Madison	10	2,841	69.24%	Won	nonpartisan election	
2011	Satya Rhodes	Common Council	Madison	12	0	100%	Won	nonpartisan election, unopposed	
2011	TJ Mertz	Common Council	Madison	13	1,224	35.63%	Lost	nonpartisan election	
2011	Marjorie Passman	Madison School Board	Madison	6	0	100%	Won	nonpartisan election, unopposed	
2011	Dorothy Krause	Common Council	Fitchburg	1	566	54.05%	Won	nonpartisan election	
2010	Barbara Vedder	Board of Supervisors	Dane County	2	0	100%	Won	nonpartisan election, unopposed	
2010	Michael Johnson	Board of Supervisors	Dane County	5	100	38.02%	Lost	nonpartisan election	
2010	John Hendrick	Board of Supervisors	Dane County	6	0	100%	Won	nonpartisan election, unopposed	
2010	Al Matano	Board of Supervisors	Dane County	11	0	100%	Won	nonpartisan election, unopposed	
2010	Kyle Richmond	Board of Supervisors	Dane County	27	878	67.48%	Won	nonpartisan election	
2010	Arlene Silveria	Madison School Board	Madison	1	0	100%	Won	nonpartisan election, unopposed	
2009	Brenda Konkel	Common Council	Madison	2	900	48.00%	Lost	nonpartisan election	
2009	Mike Verveer	Common Council	Madison	4	0	100%	Won	nonpartisan election, unopposed	
2009	Marsha Rummel	Common Council	Madison	6	0	100%	Won	nonpartisan election, unopposed	
2009	Katrina Flores	Common Council	Madison	8	110	20.71%	Lost	nonpartisan election, did not advance to top-two general	
2009	Satya Rhodes	Common Council	Madison	12	0	100%	Won	nonpartisan election, unopposed	
2009	Arlene Silviera	Madison School Board	Madison	1	0	100%	Won	nonpartisan election, unopposed	
2009	Beth Moss	Madison School Board	Madison	3	0	100%	Won	nonpartisan election, unopposed	
2008	Barbara Vedder	Board of Supervisors	Dane County	2	0	100%	Won	nonpartisan election, unopposed	
2008	Wyndham Manning	Board of Supervisors	Dane County	5	304	66.08%	Won	nonpartisan election	
2008	Chuck Erickson	Board of Supervisors	Dane County	13	0	100%	Won	nonpartisan election, unopposed	
2008	John Hendrick	Board of Supervisors	Dane County	6	1,711	84.03%	Won	nonpartisan election	
2008	Al Matano	Board of Supervisors	Dane County	11	1,578	58.92%	Won	nonpartisan election	
2008	Kyle Richmond	Board of Supervisors	Dane County	27	0	100%	Won	nonpartisan election, unopposed	
2008	Marj Passman	Madison School Board	Madison	6	0	100%	Won	nonpartisan election, unopposed	
2007	Brenda Konkel	Common Council	Madison	2	0	100%	Won	nonpartisan election, unopposed	
2007	Mike Verveer	Common Council	Madison	4	0	100%	Won	nonpartisan election, unopposed	
2007	Robbie Webber	Common Council	Madison	5	763	55.37%	Won	nonpartisan election	
2007	Marsha Rummel	Common Council	Madison	6	2,356	71.26%	Won	nonpartisan election	
2007	Lauren Woods	Common Council	Madison	8	416	44.11%	Lost	nonpartisan election	
2007	Tim Gruber	Common Council	Madison	11	1,748	50.36%	Won	nonpartisan election	
2007	Satya Rhodes	Common Council	Madison	12	1,399	51.96%	Won	nonpartisan election	
2007	Vicky Selkowe	Common Council	Madison	15	1,108	41.4%	Lost	nonpartisan election	
2007	Beth Moss	Madison School Board	Madison	3	28,673	64.66%	Won	nonpartisan election	
2007	Johnny Winston	Madison School Board	Madison	4	28,684	66.60%	Won	nonpartisan election	
2007	Marj Passman	Madison School Board	Madison	5	20,416	46.38%	Lost	nonpartisan election	
2006	Ashok Kumar	Board of Supervisors	Dane County	5	465	69.61%	Won	nonpartisan election	
2006	Chuck Erickson	Board of Supervisors	Dane County	13	0	100%	Won	nonpartisan election, unopposed	
2006	John Hendrick	Board of Supervisors	Dane County	6	0	100%	Won	nonpartisan election, unopposed	
2006	Al Matano	Board of Supervisors	Dane County	11	0	100%	Won	nonpartisan election, unopposed	
2006	Kyle Richmond	Board of Supervisors	Dane County	27	0	100%	Won	nonpartisan election, unopposed	
2006	Arlene Silviera	Madison School Board	Madison	1	0	100%	Won	nonpartisan election, unopposed	
2005	Lisa Subeck	Common Council	Madison	1	714	40.77%	Lost	nonpartisan election	
2005	Brenda Konkel	Common Council	Madison	2	0	100%	Won	nonpartisan election, unopposed	
2005	Mike Verveer	Common Council	Madison	4	0	100%	Won	nonpartisan election, unopposed	
2005	Robbie Webber	Common Council	Madison	5	629	62.90%	Won	nonpartisan election	
2005	Judy Olson	Common Council	Madison	6	0	100%	Won	nonpartisan election, unopposed	
2005	Austin King	Common Council	Madison	8	0	100%	Won	nonpartisan election, unopposed	
2005	Brian Benford	Common Council	Madison	12	1,044	55.79%	Won	nonpartisan election	
2005	Chris Kratchowill	Common Council	Madison	10	726	32.32%	Lost	nonpartisan election	
2005	Tim Gruber	Common Council	Madison	11	0	100%	Won	nonpartisan election, unopposed	
2005	Sarah King	Common Council	Madison	13	781	45.22%	Lost	nonpartisan election	
2005	Lori Nitzel	Madison School Board	Madison	15	796	43.73%	Lost	nonpartisan election	
2004	Beth Gross	Board of Supervisors	Dane County	2	810	52.73%	Won	nonpartisan election	
2004	Brett Hulsey	Board of Supervisors	Dane County	4	1,824	70.15%	Won	nonpartisan election	
2004	Echnaton Vedder	Board of Supervisors	Dane County	5	0	100%	Won	nonpartisan election, unopposed	
2004	Jeff Schimpff	Board of Supervisors	Dane County	10	642	16.19%	Lost	nonpartisan election, did not advance to top-two general	
2004	Al Matano	Board of Supervisors	Dane County	11	1,638	65.46%	Won	nonpartisan election	
2004	Chuck Erickson	Board of Supervisors	Dane County	13	0	100%	Won	nonpartisan election, unopposed	
2004	Jeanne Behrend	Board of Supervisors	Dane County	20	828	47.15%	Lost	nonpartisan election	
2004	Dorothy Valentine	Board of Supervisors	Dane County	25	556	34.46%	Lost	nonpartisan election	
2004	Kyle Richmond	Board of Supervisors	Dane County	27	0	100%	Won	nonpartisan election, unopposed	
2004	Caroline Werner	Board of Supervisors	Dane County	35	854	28.45%	Lost	nonpartisan election, did not advance to top-two general	
2004	Shwaw Vang	Madison School Board	Madison	3	19,987	70.76%	Won	nonpartisan election	
2004	Johnny Winston Jr.	Madison School Board	Madison	4	15,682	55.42%	Won	nonpartisan election	
2003	Brenda Konkel	Common Council	Madison	2	2,004	77.10%	Won	nonpartisan election	
2003	Mike Verveer	Common Council	Madison	4	0	100%	Won	nonpartisan election, unopposed	
2003	Judy Olson	Common Council	Madison	6	0	100%	Won	nonpartisan election, unopposed	
2003	Austin King	Common Council	Madison	8	763	65.38%	Won	nonpartisan election	
2003	Jean MacCubbin	Common Council	Madison	11	0	100%	Won	nonpartisan election, unopposed	
2003	Brian Benford	Common Council	Madison	12	1,573	55.09%	Won	nonpartisan election	
2003	Bert Zipperer	Mayor	Madison	At-Large	6,610	16.22%	Lost	nonpartisan election, did not advance to top-two general	
2002	Brett Hulsey	Board of Supervisors	Dane County	4	1,630	61.95%	Won	nonpartisan election	
2002	Echnaton Vedder	Board of Supervisors	Dane County	5	423	63.13%	Won	nonpartisan election	
2002	John Hendrick	Board of Supervisors	Dane County	6	0	100%	Won	nonpartisan election, unopposed	
2002	Al Matano	Board of Supervisors	Dane County	11	0	100%	Won	nonpartisan election, unopposed	
2002	Chuck Erickson	Board of Supervisors	Dane County	13	0	100%	Won	nonpartisan election, unopposed	
2002	Joe Lindstrom	Board of Supervisors	Dane County	15	433	42.87%	Lost	nonpartisan election	
2002	Andrew Kraiss	Board of Supervisors	Dane County	16	731	39.51%	Lost	nonpartisan election	
2002	Jeanne Behrend	Board of Supervisors	Dane County	20	796	47.29%	Lost	nonpartisan election	
2002	Kyle Richmond	Board of Supervisors	Dane County	27	678	54.24%	Won	nonpartisan election	
2002	Scott McCormick	Board of Supervisors	Dane County	27	335	36.45%	Lost	nonpartisan election, did not advance to top-two general	
2002	Tom Powell	Common Council	Madison	5	504	51.85%	Won	nonpartisan election	
2001	District 2: Brenda Konkel	Common Council	Madison	2	1,001	55.21%	Won	nonpartisan election	
2001	District 4: Mike Verveer	Common Council	Madison	4	0	100%	Won	nonpartisan election, unopposed	
2001	District 5: Jessy Tolkan	Common Council	Madison	5	369	67.58%	Won	nonpartisan election	
2001	District 6: Judy Olson	Common Council	Madison	6	0	100%	Won	nonpartisan election, unopposed	
2001	District 8: Todd Jarrell	Common Council	Madison	8	712	67.68%	Won	nonpartisan election	
2001	District 11: Jean MacCubbin	Common Council	Madison	11	0	100%	Won	nonpartisan election, unopposed	
2001	District 13: Matt Sloan	Common Council	Madison	13	0	100%	Won	nonpartisan election, unopposed	
2001	District 15: Kent Palmer	Common Council	Madison	15	0	100%	Won	nonpartisan election, unopposed	
2001	Shwaw Vang	Madison School Board	Madison	3	18,372	56.37%	Won	nonpartisan election	
2000	District 5: Tom Powell	Board of Supervisors	Dane County	5	412	69.24%	Won	nonpartisan election	
2000	District 6: John Hendrick	Board of Supervisors	Dane County	6	0	100%	Won	nonpartisan election, unopposed	
2000	District 8: Echnaton Vedder	Board of Supervisors	Dane County	8	569	65.25%	Won	nonpartisan election	
2000	District 10: Chuck Erickson	Board of Supervisors	Dane County	10	914	38.33%	Lost	nonpartisan election	
2000	District 11: Al Matano	Board of Supervisors	Dane County	11	1,175	50.17%	Won	nonpartisan election	
2000	District 13: Regina Rhyne	Board of Supervisors	Dane County	13	794	48.71%	Won	nonpartisan election	
2000	District 19: Brett Hulsey	Board of Supervisors	Dane County	19	0	100%	Won	nonpartisan election, unopposed	
2000	District 20: Forrest Aguirre	Board of Supervisors	Dane County	20	928	41.67%	Lost	nonpartisan election	
2000	District 21: Penny Andrews	Board of Supervisors	Dane County	21	78	15.75%	Lost	nonpartisan election, did not advance to top-two general	
2000	Bill Keys	Madison School Board	Madison	1	18,149	55.24%	Won	nonpartisan election	

== See also ==
- American Left
- Democratic Socialists of America
- Richmond Progressive Alliance
- Green Party of the United States
- History of the socialist movement in the United States
- List of mayors of Madison, Wisconsin
