= Mayoral elections in Madison, Wisconsin =

Nonpartisan elections are currently held every four years, in the year preceding a United States presidential election, to elect the mayor of Madison, Wisconsin.

== 1874 ==
1874 Madison mayoral election
Party	Candidate	Votes	%	±%
General election, April 7, 1874
Democratic	Silas U. Pinney	1,015	66.78	
Republican	Hiram Giles	505	33.22	
Plurality		510	33.55	
Total votes		1,520	100	
Democratic hold				

== 1875 ==
Silas U. Pinney was re-elected in 1875.

== 1876 ==
1876 Madison mayoral election
Party	Candidate	Votes	%	±%
General election, April 4, 1876
Democratic	John N. Jones	879	50.84	
Independent Democrat	Silas U. Pinney (incumbent)	850	49.16	
Plurality		29	1.68	
Total votes		1,729	100	
Democratic hold				

== 1969 and 1971 ==
William Dyke was elected in both 1969 and 1971

== 1973 ==
Paul Soglin (a member of the Madison Common Council) won an upset victory over incumbent mayor William Dyke.

1973 Madison mayoral election
Party	Candidate	Votes	%	±%
Primary election, March 6, 1973
Nonpartisan	William Dyke (incumbent)	16,243	36.16	
Nonpartisan	Paul Soglin	11,485	25.56	
Nonpartisan	David Stewart	10,350	23.04	
Nonpartisan	Leo Cooper	6,150	13.69	
Nonpartisan	R. Whelan Burke	283	0.63	
Nonpartisan	David Robb	161	0.36	
Nonpartisan	Joseph Kraemer	122	0.27	
Nonpartisan	Mark Gregersen	27	0.06	
	Scattering	105	0.23	
Total votes		44,926	100	
General election, April 3, 1973
Nonpartisan	Paul Soglin	37,548	52.35	
Nonpartisan	William Dyke (incumbent)	34,179	47.65	
Plurality		3,369	4.70	
Total votes		71,727	100	

== 1975 and 1977 ==
Paul Soglin won re-election.

== 1983 ==
1983 Madison mayoral election
- April 5, 1983
Candidate	Joseph Sensenbrenner	Robert Reynolds
Party	Nonpartisan	Nonpartisan
Popular vote	22,025	19,575
Percentage	52.94%	47.06%
Mayor before election
Joel Skornicka
Independent
Elected mayor
Joseph Sensenbrenner
Democratic

The 1989 Madison mayoral election saw the election of Joseph Sensenbrenner.

Both Sensenbrenner and his general election opponent, Robert "Toby" Reynolds, were lawyers. Sensenbrenner was a deputy attorney general of Wisconsin, and also formerly worked as an aide to Patrick J. Lucey during Lucey's governorship. Both Sensenbrenner and Reynolds were considered to be liberal members of the Democratic Party. The election was considered the most major local election held in the state in 1983. It coincided on the ballot with the 1983 Wisconsin Supreme Court election.

In December 1982, incumbent Madison Mayor Joel Skornicka announced he would not run for a third term. Two weeks later, Sensenbrenner announced his candidacy. Sensenbrenner quickly earned the endorsement of the outgoing Mayor and inherited many of his campaign supporters and staff. Sensenbrenner's campaign emphasized his experience in state government and management skills, and, in the crowded 8-person nonpartisan primary, he came in a close second to former alderman and past mayoral candidate Robert Reynolds. Reynolds and Sensenbrenner faced off in the April election, with both running on a liberal Democratic platform. Sensenbrenner continued to emphasize his managerial acumen, while Reynolds focused more on his desire to lead and motivate the city's various constituencies. Sensenbrenner prevailed with 53% of the vote in the April general election.

1983 Madison mayoral election
Party	Candidate	Votes	%
Nonpartisan primary (February 15, 1983)
Nonpartisan	Robert Reynolds	7,394	37.66%
Nonpartisan	Joseph Sensenbrenner	6,961	35.45%
Nonpartisan	Michael Briggs	3,397	17.30%
Nonpartisan	Michael Ducey	1,018	5.18%
Nonpartisan	Carol Gainer	341	1.74%
Nonpartisan	Thomas Byrne	291	1.48%
Nonpartisan	Douglas Wanberg	126	0.64%
Nonpartisan	Syed Ameen	108	0.55%
Plurality		433	2.21%
Total votes		19,636	100.0%
General election (April 5, 1983)
Nonpartisan	Joseph Sensenbrenner (incumbent)	22,025	52.94%
Nonpartisan	Robert Reynolds	19,575	47.06%
Plurality		2,450	5.89%
Total votes		41,600	100.0%

== 1985 ==
1985 Madison mayoral election
Party	Candidate	Votes	%
General election (April 2, 1985)
Nonpartisan	Joseph Sensenbrenner (incumbent)	24,536	73.49
Nonpartisan	Alex Cunningham	8,852	26.51
Plurality		15,684	46.97
Total votes		33,388	100.0

== 1987 ==
1987 Madison mayoral election
Party	Candidate	Votes	%
General election (April 7, 1987)
Nonpartisan	Joseph Sensenbrenner (incumbent)	36,341	67.48
Nonpartisan	Mary Kay Baum	17,510	32.52
Plurality		18,831	34.97
Total votes		53,851	100.0

== 1989 ==
1989 Madison mayoral election
- April 4, 1989
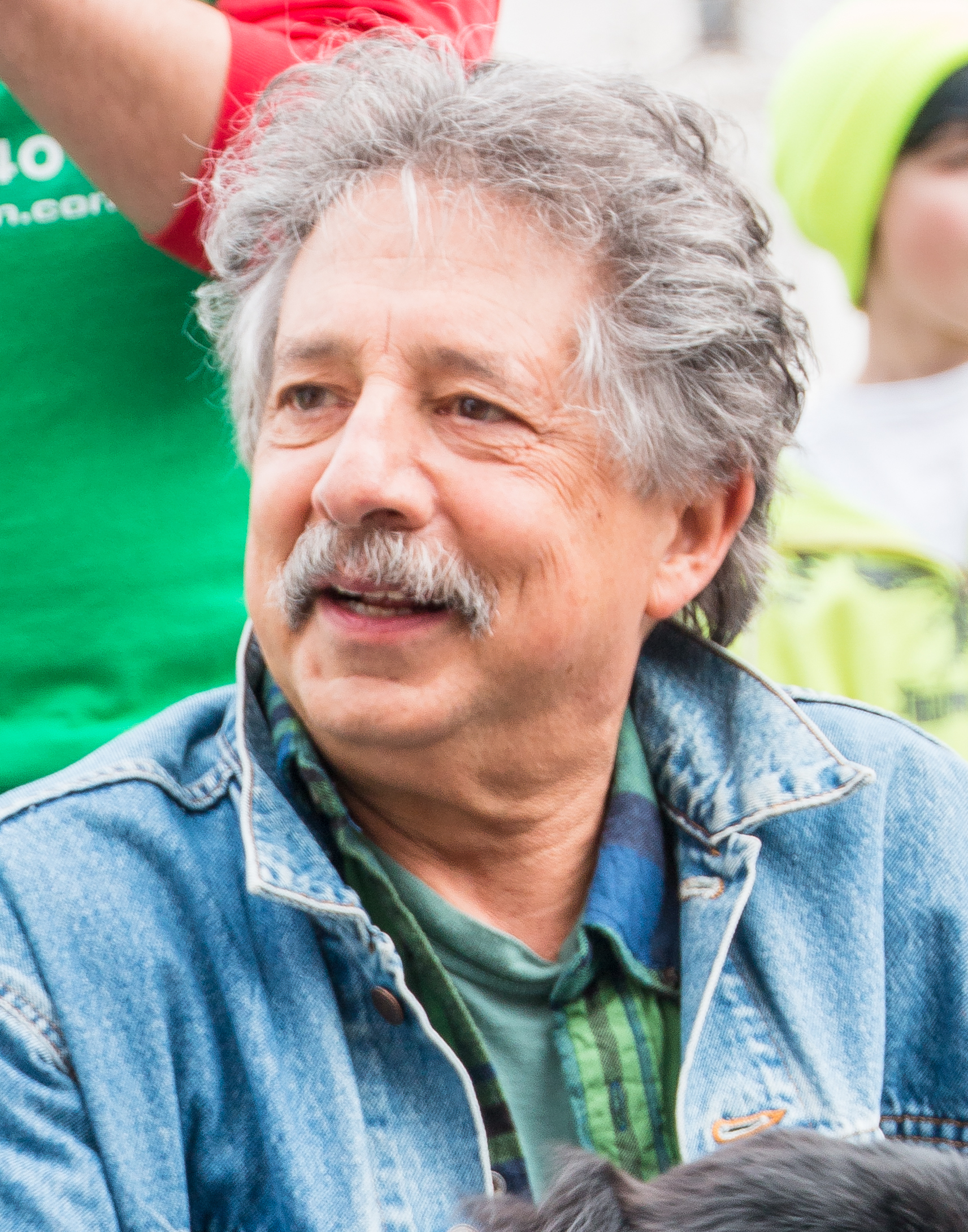

Candidate	Paul Soglin	Joseph Sensenbrenner
Party	Nonpartisan	Nonpartisan
Popular vote	34,537	26,280
Percentage	56.79%	43.21%
Mayor before election
Joseph Sensenbrenner
Democratic
Elected mayor
Paul Soglin
Democratic

In the 1989 Madison mayoral election, incumbent mayor Sensenbrenner sought reelection while advocating for a proposed convention center on Lake Monona. He was challenged by former mayor Soglin (who had served six years as mayor in the 1970s) and four other candidates. Sensenbrenner faced attacks throughout the race on the prioritization of the city's convention center project (seen as a luxury pavilion for the city's elites) over the interests and services for working class downtown and near-downtown districts. Sensenbrenner barely survived the February primary, with only 50 votes separating him from 3rd place finisher Rick Berg. Also on the April election ballot was a city referendum for raising property taxes to pay for Sensenbrenner's proposed convention center. Sensenbrenner and the referendum were defeated by a similar margin. Despite the setback for the convention center, it did eventually get built. As mayor, Soglin quickly reversed his position from the campaign, and the convention center, now known as Monona Terrace, was opened in 1997.

1989 Madison mayoral election
Party	Candidate	Votes	%
Nonpartisan primary (February 21, 1989)
Nonpartisan	Paul Soglin	15,600	39.31%
Nonpartisan	Joseph Sensenbrenner (incumbent)	10,575	26.65
Nonpartisan	Richard Berg	10,526	26.52
Nonpartisan	Eugene Parks	1,841	4.64
Nonpartisan	John Roussos	892	2.25
Nonpartisan	Dennis DeNure	251	0.63
Plurality		5,025	12.66
Total votes		39,685	100.0
General election (April 4, 1989)
Nonpartisan	Paul Soglin	34,537	56.79
Nonpartisan	Joseph Sensenbrenner (incumbent)	26,280	43.21
Plurality		8,257	13.58
Total votes		60,817	100.0

== 1991, 1993, 1995 ==
Paul Soglin was re-elected

== 1997 (special) ==
Madison mayoral special election, 1997
- February 17, 1997 (primary); April 1, 1997 (general)
- Turnout: 26% reg. voters (Note: Wisconsin allows same-day voter registration. "Registered voters" election turnout is calculated by dividing the ballots cast (a figure that includes ballots cast voters who registered day-of on Election Day) by the voter registration as it stood on the eve of Election Day (a total which excludes day-of voters).) ▲3 pp (primary); 32% reg. voters ▼2 pp (general)
Candidate	Susan J. M. Bauman	Wayne Bigelow
Party	Nonpartisan	Nonpartisan
Popular vote	25,455	25,389
Percentage	49.23%	49.10%
Mayor before election
Paul Soglin
Democratic
Elected mayor
Susan J. M. Bauman
Democratic

The 1997 Madison mayoral special election was held February 17 and April 1, 1997, to elect the mayor of Madison, Wisconsin. It was held after the resignation of incumbent mayor Paul Soglin. It saw the election of Susan J. M. Bauman.

=== Candidates ===
- Ray Allen, Madison School Board member
- Richard H. Anderson
- Susan J. M. Bauman, alderperson on the Madison Common Council
- Wayne Bigelow, president of the Madison Common Council
- John Hendrick, supervisor on the Dane County Board since 1994
- Mary Lang-Sollinger, community activist and political fundraiser
- Tom Neale
- David Travis, member of the Wisconsin State Assembly

=== Results ===
The February county and city primaries saw 42,483 ballots cast in Madison, reported as a turnout of 26% (compared to election-eve voter registration).

1997 Madison mayoral primary results
Candidate	Votes	%
Wayne Bigelow	9,332	22.38
Susan J. M. Bauman	9,100	21.82
Ray Allen	7,954	19.07
John Hendrick	6,875	16.49
David Travis	4,588	11.00
Mary Lang-Sollinger	3,513	8.42
Richard H. Anderson	198	0.48
Tom Neale	145	0.35
Total votes	41,695	100
Undervotes	788	1.85
Turnout	42,483	25%

The April county and city general elections saw 52,619 ballots cast in Madison, reported as a turnout of 32% (compared to election-eve voter registration).

1997 Madison mayoral general election results
Candidate	Votes	%
Susan J. M. Bauman	25,455	49.23
Wayne Bigelow	25,389	49.10
Denis Collins write-in	462	0.89
Other write-ins	398	0.76
Total votes	51,704	100
Undervotes	915	1.74
Turnout	52,619	32%

== 1999 ==
Madison mayoral election, 1999
- April 9, 1999
- Turnout: 31% reg. voters ▼1 pp
Candidate	Susan J. M. Bauman	Eugene Parks
Party	Nonpartisan	Nonpartisan
Popular vote	35,204	8,294
Percentage	80.04%	18.85%
Mayor before election
Susan J. M. Bauman
Democratic
Elected mayor
Susan J. M. Bauman
Democratic

The 1999 Madison mayoral election was held April 9, 1999, to elect the mayor of Madison, Wisconsin. It saw the reelection of incumbent mayor Susan J. M. Bauman.

Since only two candidates ran, no primary was held.

=== Results ===
The April county and city general saw 45,248 ballots cast in Madison, reported as a turnout of 31% (compared to election-eve voter registration).

1999 Madison mayoral general election results
Candidate	Votes	%
Susan J. M. Bauman (incumbent)	35,204	80.04
Eugene Parks	8,294	18.85
Write-ins	483	1.09
Total votes	43,981	100
Undervotes	1,267	2.80
Turnout	45,248	31%

== 2003 ==
2003 Madison mayoral election
- February 20, 2003 (primary); April 4, 2003 (general)
- Turnout: 26% reg. voters (primary); 38% reg. voters ▲7 pp (general)
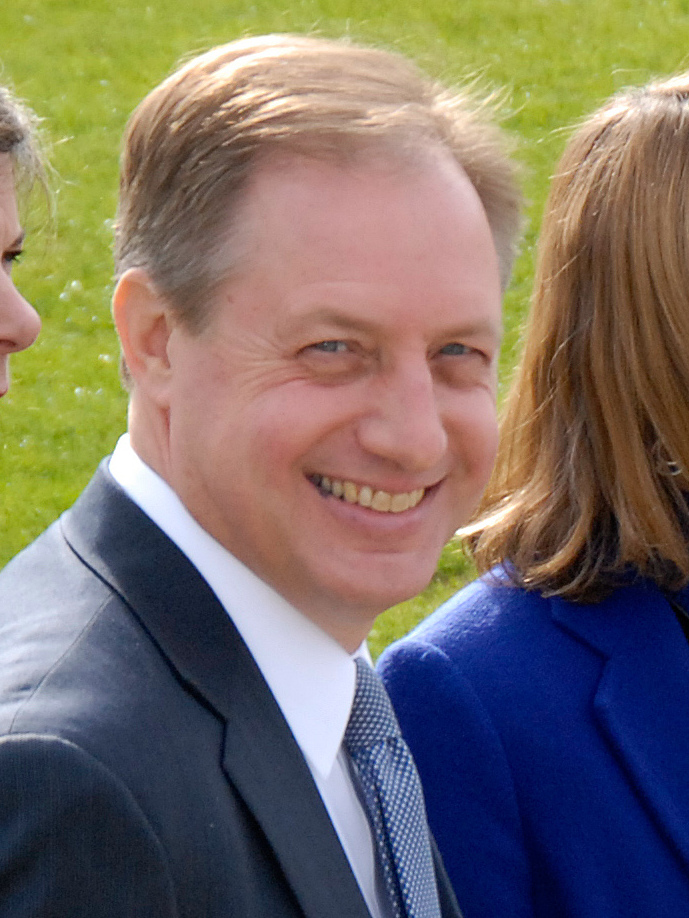

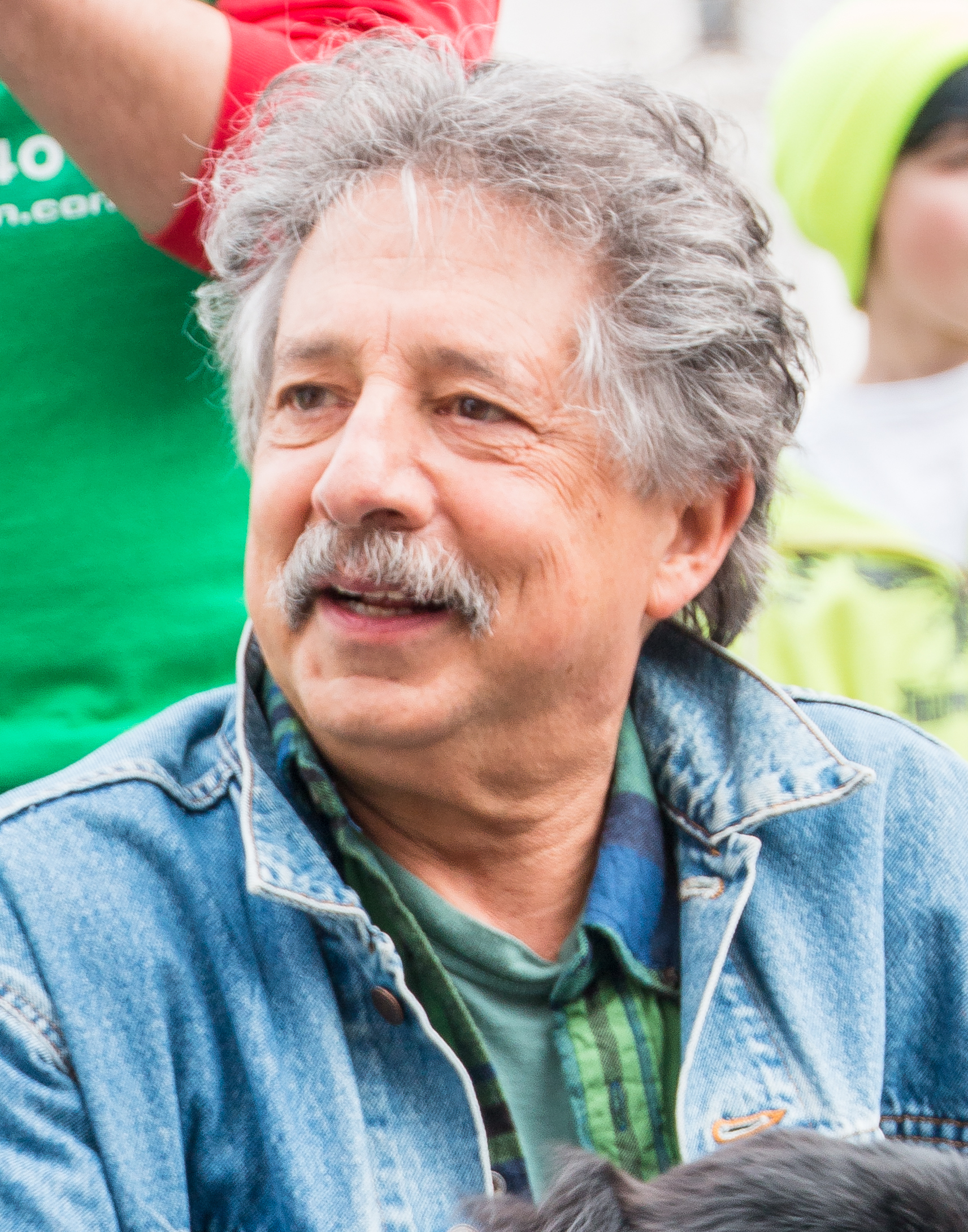
Candidate	Dave Cieslewicz	Paul Soglin
Party	Nonpartisan	Nonpartisan
Popular vote	29,717	28,528
Percentage	50.76%	48.73%
Results by precinct
Cieslewicz
50–60%
60–70%
70-80%
Soglin
50–60%
60–70%
Mayor before election
Susan J. M. Bauman
Democratic
Elected mayor
Dave Cieslewicz
Democratic

The 2003 Madison mayoral election was held February 20 and April 4, 2003, to elect the mayor of Madison, Wisconsin. It saw the election of Dave Cieslewicz. Incumbent mayor Susan J. M. Bauman was eliminated in the primary.

=== Candidates ===
- Susan J. M. Bauman, incumbent mayor
- Dave Cieslewicz, former member of the Dane County Board of Supervisors
- Davy Mayer
- Will Sandstrom
- Paul R. Soglin, former mayor
- Bert G. Zipperer

=== Results ===
Primary results by precinct: Cieslewicz: <30%; 30–40%; 40–50%; 50–60%; Soglin: <30%; 30–40%; 40–50%; 50–60%; Zipperer: 30–40%; 40–50%; 60–70%; Tie—39.29%

2003 Madison mayoral primary results
Candidate	Votes	%
Dave Cieslewicz	14,326	35.16
Paul R. Soglin	14,144	34.72
Bert G. Zipperer	6,610	16.22
Susan J. M. Bauman (incumbent)	4,681	11.49
Will Sandstrom	492	1.20
Davy Mayer	389	0.95
Write-ins	92	0.22
Total votes	40,734	100
Undervotes	245	0.60
Turnout	40,979	26%

2003 Madison mayoral general election results
Candidate	Votes	%
Dave Cieslewicz	29,717	50.76
Paul R. Soglin	28,528	48.73
Write-ins	291	0.49
Total votes	58,536	100
Undervotes	555	1.35
Turnout	40,979	38%

== 2007 ==
2007 Madison mayoral election
- February 22, 2007 (primary); April 5, 2007 (general)
- Turnout: 17% reg. voters ▼9 pp (primary); 30% reg. voters ▼2 pp (general)
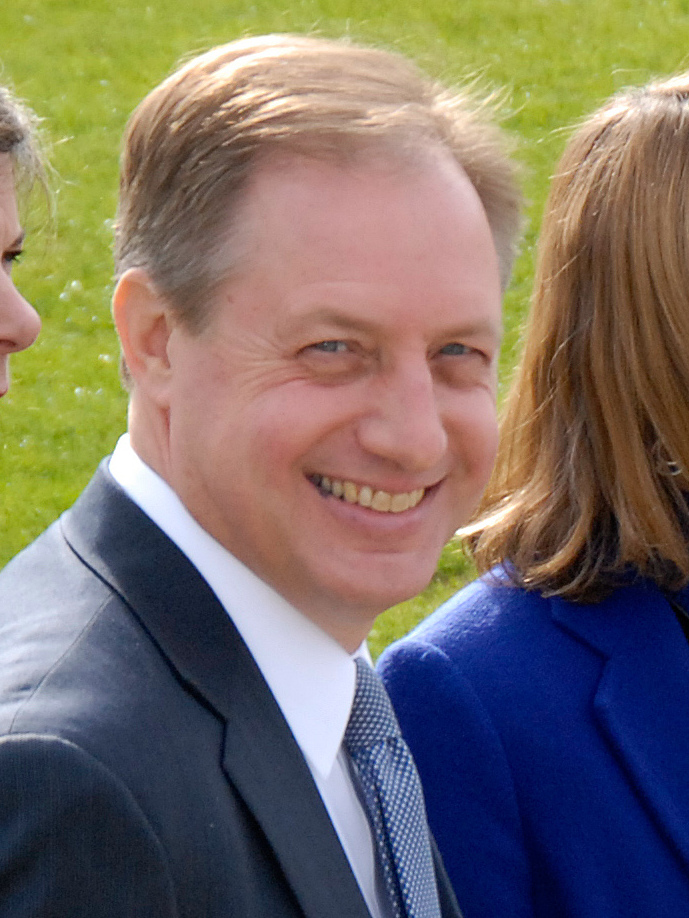

Candidate	Dave Cieslewicz	Ray Allen
Party	Nonpartisan	Nonpartisan
Popular vote	30,812	18,816
Percentage	61.78%	37.72%
Mayor before election
Dave Cieslewicz
Democratic
Elected mayor
Dave Cieslewicz
Democratic

The 2007 Madison mayoral election was held February 22 and April 5, 2007, to elect the mayor of Madison, Wisconsin. It saw the reelection of incumbent mayor Dave Cieslewicz.

=== Candidates ===
- Ray Allen, Madison School Board member and 1997 mayoral candidate
- Dave Cieslewicz, incumbent mayor
- Peter Munoz
- Will Sandstrom, 2003 mayoral candidate

=== Results ===
2007 Madison mayoral primary results
Candidate	Votes	%
Dave Cieslewicz (incumbent)	15,488	57.50
Ray Allen	8,042	29.86
Peter Munoz	2,661	9.88
Will Sandstrom	641	2.38
Write-ins	100	0.37
Total votes	26,932	100
Undervotes	300	1.10
Turnout	27232	17%

2007 Madison mayoral general election results
Candidate	Votes	%
Dave Cieslewicz (incumbent)	30,812	61.78
Ray Allen	18,816	37.72
Write-ins	244	0.48
Total votes	49,872	100
Undervotes	1,519	3.14
Turnout	48353	30%

== 2011 ==
2011 Madison mayoral election
- February 15, 2011 (primary); April 5, 2011 (general)
- Turnout: 22% reg. voters ▲5 pp (primary); 54% reg. voters ▲24 pp (general)
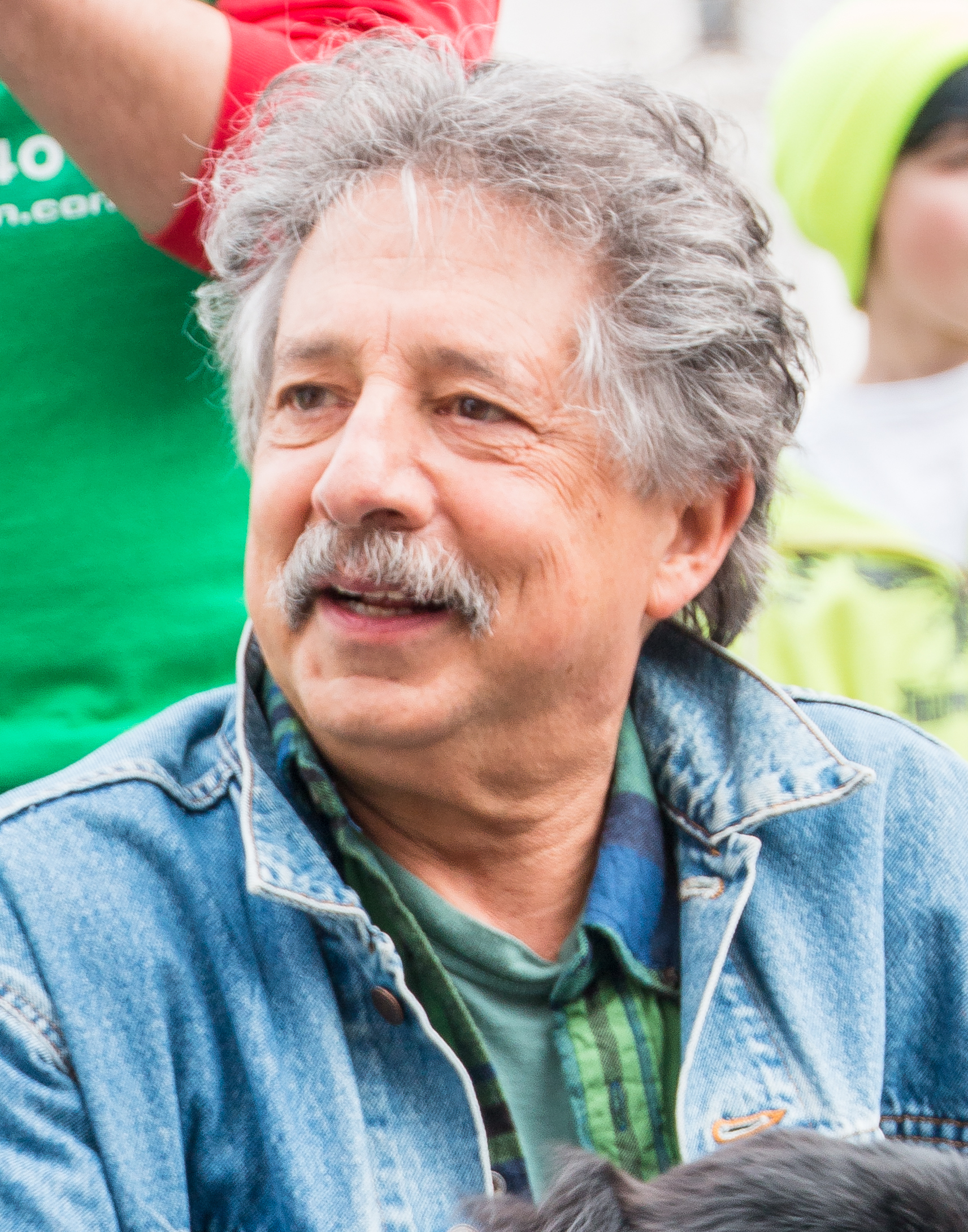

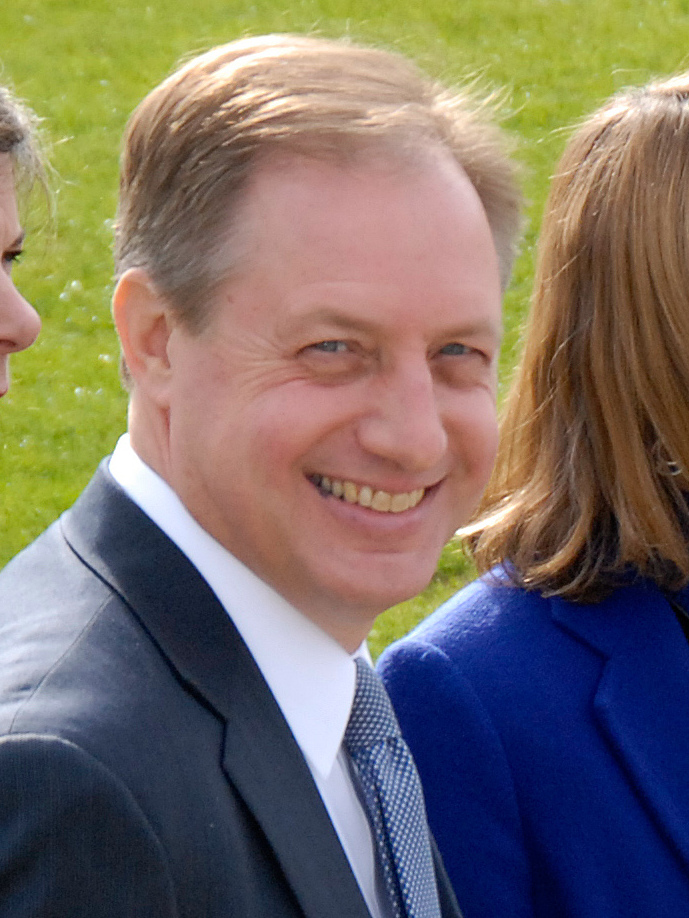
Candidate	Paul Soglin	Dave Cieslewicz
Party	Nonpartisan	Nonpartisan
Popular vote	44,542	43,829
Percentage	49.76%	48.96%
Mayor before election
Dave Cieslewicz
Democratic
Elected mayor
Paul Soglin
Democratic

The 2011 Madison mayoral election was held April 4, 2003, to elect the mayor of Madison, Wisconsin. It saw former mayor Paul Soglin return to the mayoralty by unseating incumbent mayor Dave Cieslewicz.

The primary and general election both coincided with those for a high-profile state supreme court race.

=== Candidates ===
- John Blotz
- Dave Cieslewicz, incumbent mayor
- Dennis Amadeus de Nure
- Nick Hart
- Paul R. Soglin, former mayor

=== Results ===
2011 Madison mayoral primary results
Candidate	Votes	%
Paul R. Soglin	18,693	49.49
Dave Cieslewicz (incumbent)	17,500	46.33
Nick Hart	598	1.58
John Blotz	569	1.50
Dennis Amadeus de Nure	274	0.72
Write-ins	137	0.36
Total votes	37,771	100
Undervotes	818	2.12
Turnout	38589	22%

2011 Madison mayoral general election results
Candidate	Votes	%
Paul R. Soglin	44,542	49.76
Dave Cieslewicz (incumbent)	43,829	48.96
Write-ins	1,133	1.26
Total votes	89,504	100
Undervotes	4,472	4.76
Turnout	93976	54%

== 2015 ==
2015 Madison mayoral election
- February 17, 2015 (primary); April 7, 2015 (general)
- Turnout: 12% reg. voters ▼10 pp (primary); 30% reg. voters ▼20 pp (general)
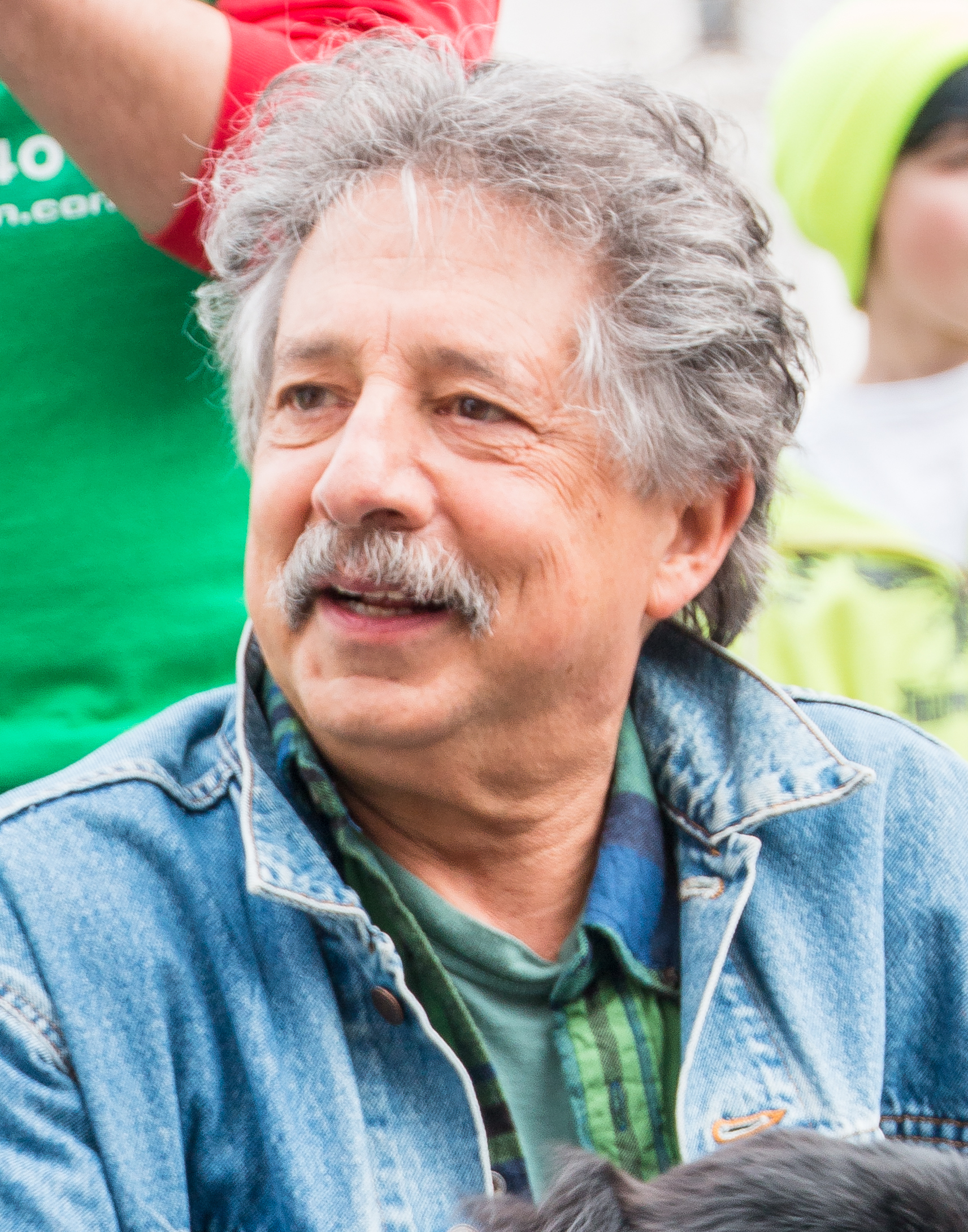

Candidate	Paul Soglin	Scott Resnick
Party	Nonpartisan	Nonpartisan
Popular vote	37,734	14,195
Percentage	72.0%	27.1%
Results by precinct
Soglin
40–50%
50–60%
60–70%
70-80%
80-90%
Resnick
No Votes
50–60%
60–70%
70-80%
Mayor before election
Paul Soglin
Democratic
Elected mayor
Paul Soglin
Democratic

The 2015 Madison mayoral election was held February 17 and April 7, 2015, to elect the mayor of Madison, Wisconsin. It saw the reelection of incumbent mayor Paul Soglin.

=== Candidates ===
- Richard V. Brown Sr.
- Christopher Daly
- Bridget Maniaci, former 2nd district member of the Madison Common Council (2009–2013)
- Scott Resnick, 8th district member of the Madison Common Council since 2011 and tech executive
- Paul Soglin, incumbent mayor

=== Results ===
2015 Madison mayoral primary results
Candidate	Votes	%
Paul R. Soglin (incumbent)	11,856	52.8
Scott Resnick	5,223	23.3
Bridget Maniaci	3,311	14.7
Richard V. Brown, Sr.	1,034	4.6
Christopher Daly	973	4.3
Write-ins	63	0.3
Total votes	22,460	100
Undervotes		
Turnout		12%

2015 Madison mayoral general election results
Candidate	Votes	%
Paul R. Soglin (incumbent)	37,734	72.0
Scott Resnick	14,195	27.1
Write-ins	506	1.0
Total votes	52,435	100
Undervotes	1,812	3.34
Turnout	54247	30%

== 2019 ==
2019 Madison mayoral election
- February 19, 2019 (primary); April 2, 2019 (general)
- Turnout: 21% reg. voters ▲9 pp (primary); 44% reg. voters ▲14 pp (general)
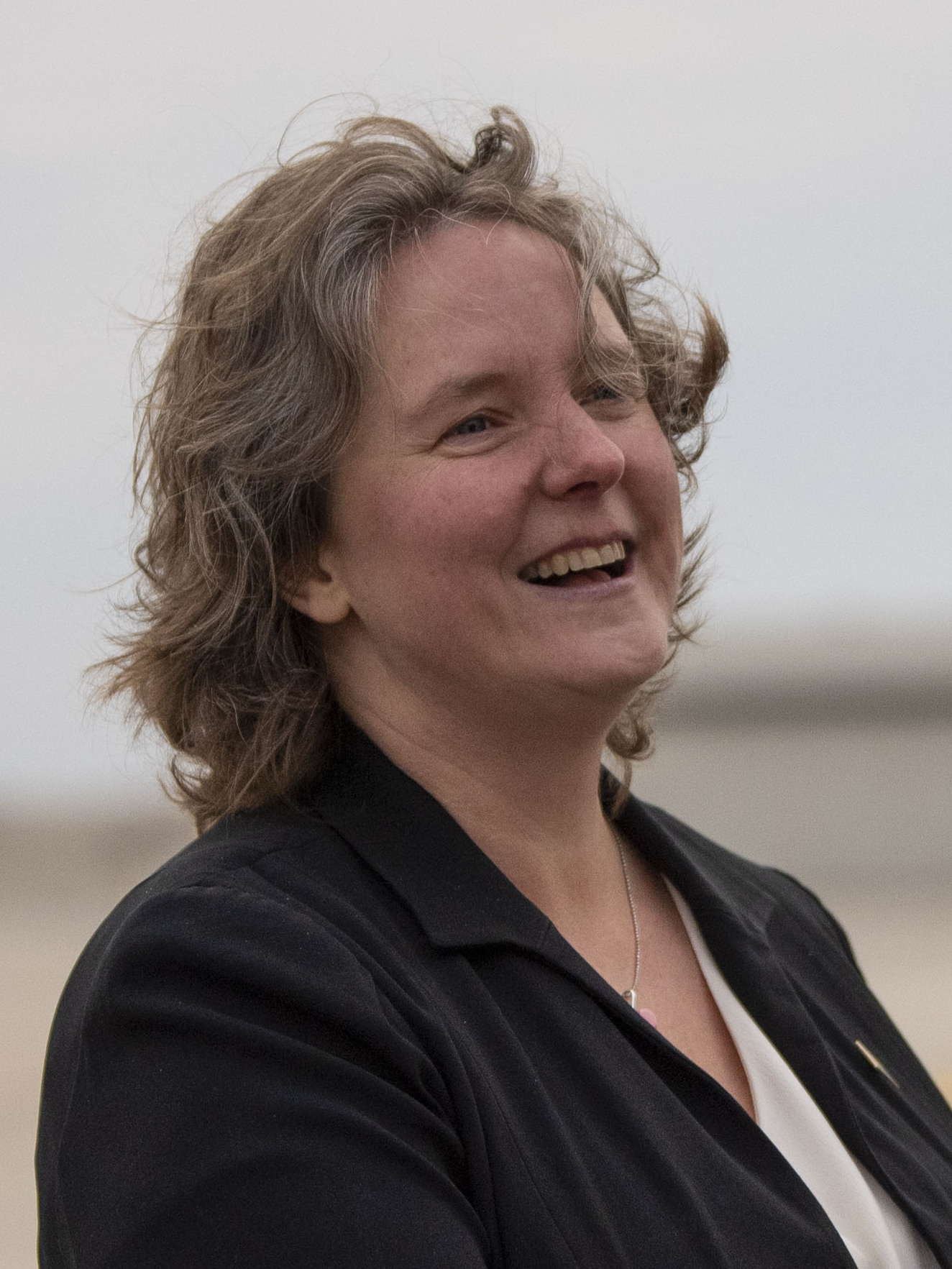

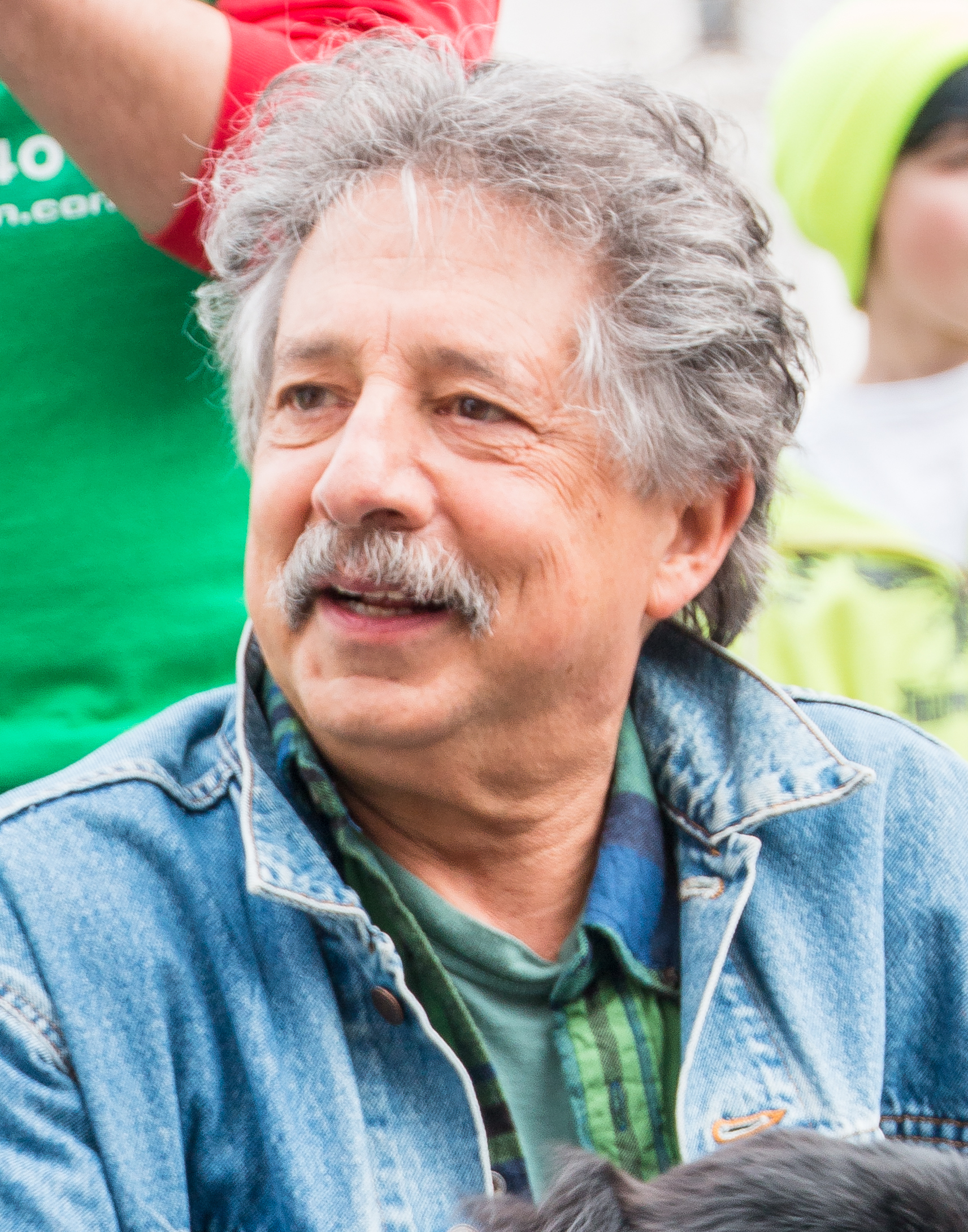
Candidate	Satya Rhodes-Conway	Paul Soglin
Party	Nonpartisan	Nonpartisan
Popular vote	47,915	29,150
Percentage	61.9%	37.7%
Results by precinct
Conway
50–60%
60–70%
70-80%
80-90%
>90%
Soglin
50–60%
60–70%
70-80%
>90%
Tie
No Votes
50%
Mayor before election
Paul Soglin
Democratic
Elected mayor
Satya Rhodes-Conway
Democratic

The 2019 Madison mayoral election was held February 19 and April 2, 2019, to elect the mayor of Madison, Wisconsin. It saw the election of Satya Rhodes-Conway, who unseated incumbent mayor Paul Soglin. Conway became the second woman and the first openly-gay individual elected mayor in the city's history.

=== Candidates ===
- Maurice "Mo" Cheeks, 10th district member of the Madison Common Council since 2013 and vice president of Business Development at MIOsoft
- Nick Hart
- Satya Rhodes-Conway, former 12th district member of the Madison Common Council
- Raj Shukla
- Paul Soglin, incumbent mayor

=== Results ===
2019 primary results by precinct: Conway: <30%; 30–40%; 40–50%; 60–70%; >90%; Soglin: <30%; 30–40%; 40–50%; 50–60%; >90%; Shukla: <30%; 30–40%; 40–50%; Cheeks: <30%; 30–40%; >90%; Tie: 20–30%; 30–40%; 50%; No Votes

2019 Madison mayoral primary results
Candidate	Votes	%
Paul R. Soglin (incumbent)	10,771	28.6
Satya Rhodes-Conway	10,448	27.7
Mo Cheeks	8,801	23.3
Raj Shukla	6,954	18.4
Nick Hart	386	1.0
Write-ins	346	0.9
Total votes	37,706	100
Undervotes	47	0.12
Turnout	37,753	21%

2019 Madison mayoral general election results
Candidate	Votes	%
Satya Rhodes-Conway	47,915	61.9
Paul R. Soglin (incumbent)	29,150	37.7
Write-ins	311	0.4
Total votes	77,376	100
Undervotes	2,077	2.61
Turnout	79,453	44%

== 2023 ==
2023 Madison mayoral election
- February 21, 2023 (primary); April 4, 2023 (general)
- Turnout: 21% reg. voters ▲18 pp (primary); 63% reg. voters ▲19 pp (general)
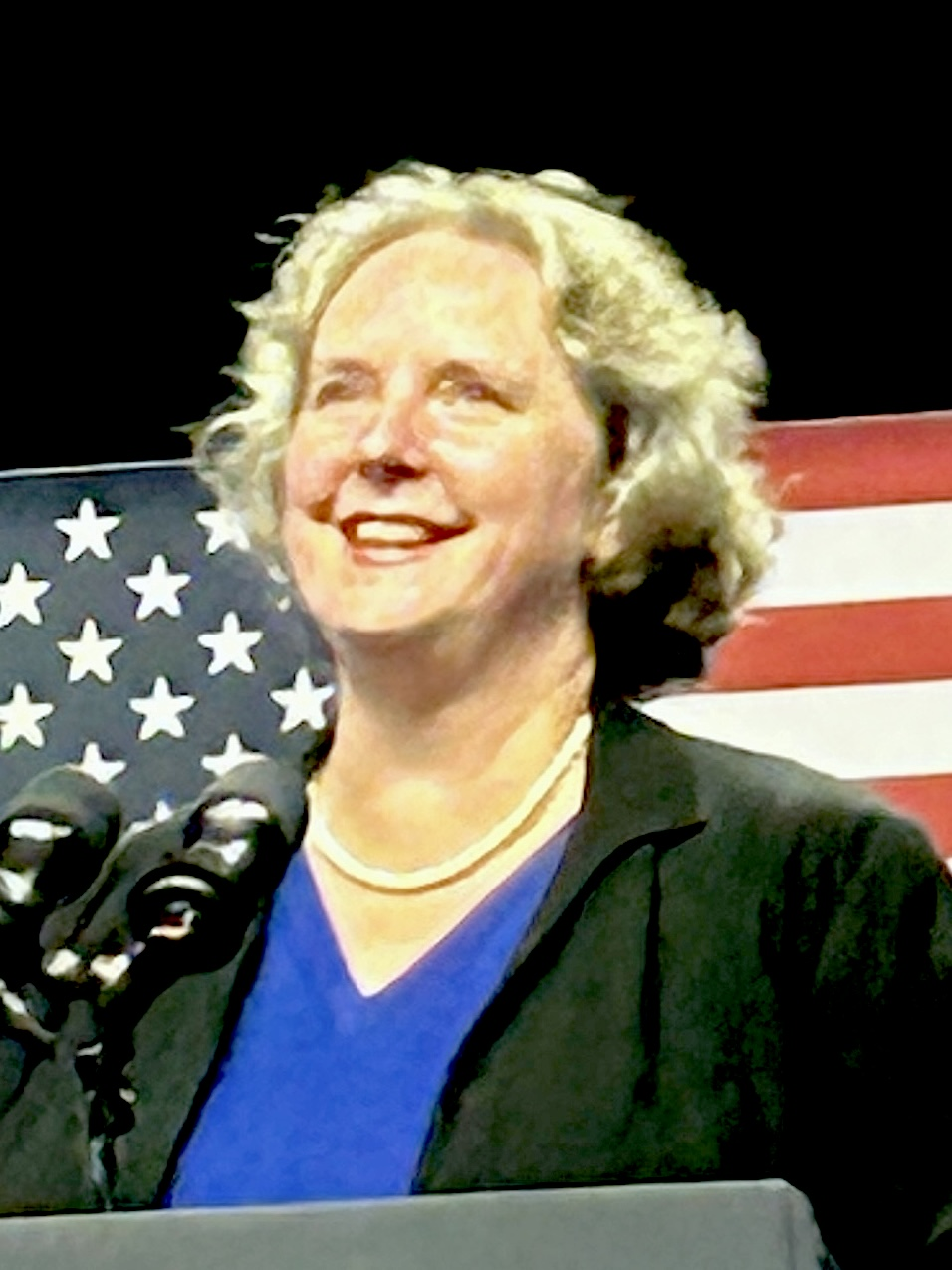

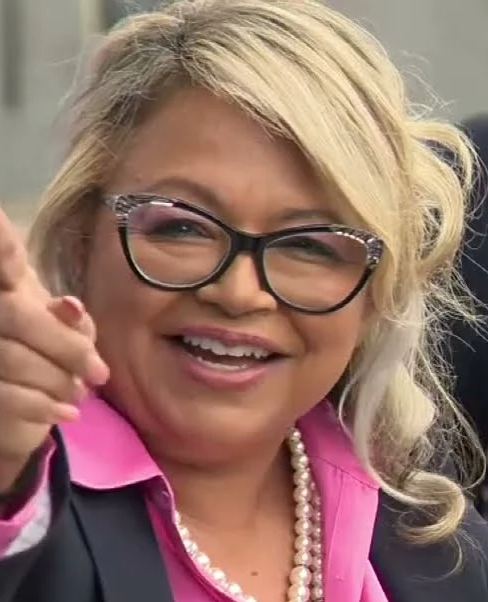
Candidate	Satya Rhodes-Conway	Gloria Reyes
Party	Nonpartisan	Nonpartisan
Popular vote	63,066	50,402
Percentage	55.2%	44.1%
Results by aldermanic district
Conway
50–60%
60–70%
Reyes
50–60%
Results by precinct
Conway
50–60%
60–70%
70-80%
Reyes
40–50%
50–60%
60–70%
Tie
No Votes
40–50%
50%
Mayor before election
Satya Rhodes-Conway
Nonpartisan
Elected mayor
Satya Rhodes-Conway
Nonpartisan

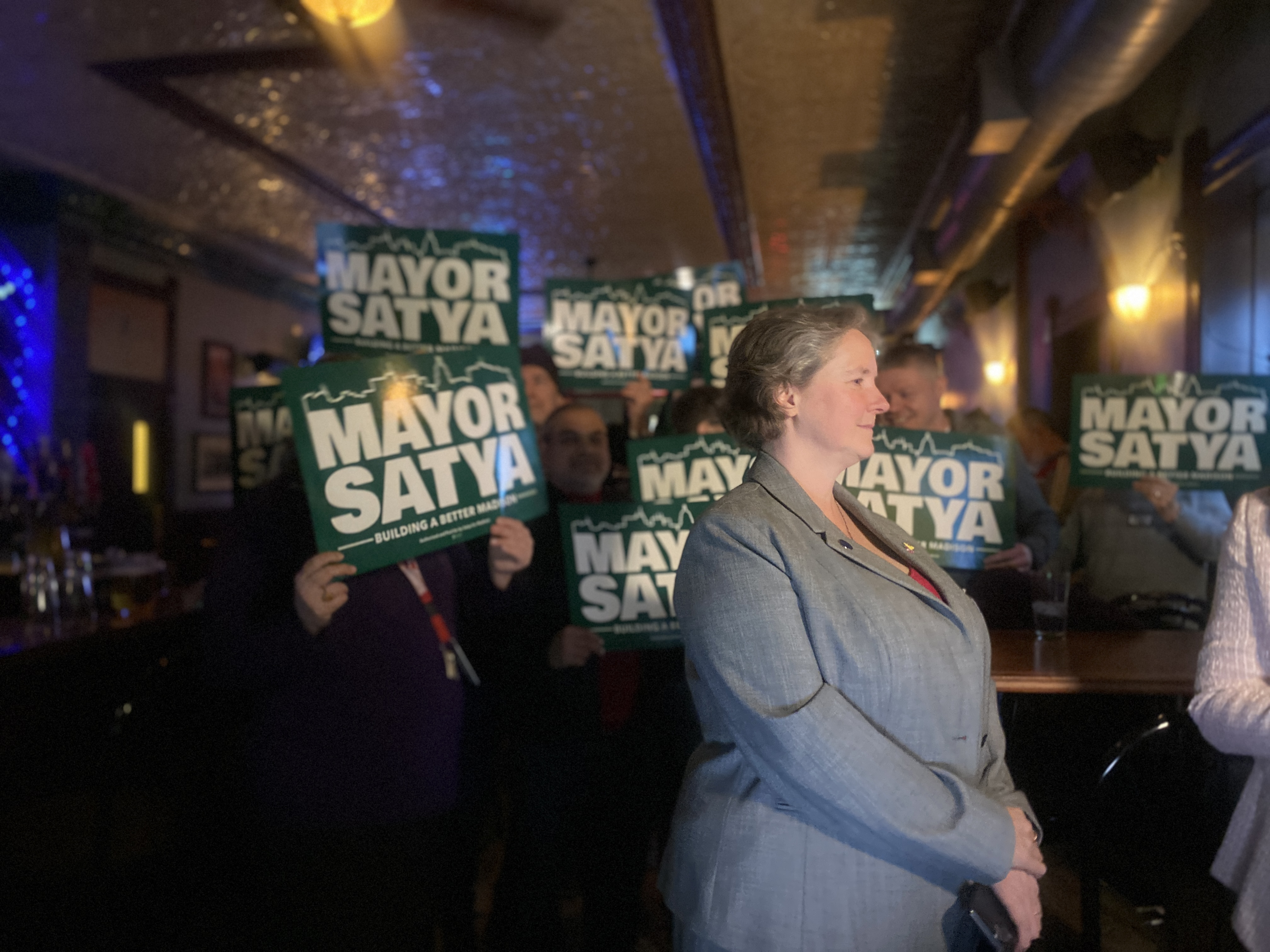
Rhodes-Conway at a campaign party on the night of the primary election

The 2023 Madison mayoral election was held on April 4, 2023, to elect the mayor of Madison, Wisconsin.

A primary election was held on February 21, 2023, to narrow down the candidates to two. It saw record turnout due to the concurrent primary for the 2023 Wisconsin Supreme Court election. Satya Rhodes-Conway and Gloria Reyes qualified for the general election, while Scott Kerr was eliminated. Daniel Howell Jr., a write-in candidate, planned on running as a write-in candidate for the general election in addition to the primary.

=== Candidates ===
- Daniel Howell Jr., caseworker and former Wisconsin Badgers football player (write-in)
- Scott Kerr, traffic engineer (endorsed Reyes in the runoff)
- Gloria Reyes, former deputy mayor and president of the Madison Board of Education
- Satya Rhodes-Conway, incumbent mayor

=== Forums ===
2023 Madison mayoral candidate forums
No.	Date	Host	Link	Nonpartisan	Nonpartisan	Nonpartisan	Nonpartisan
Key: P Participant A Absent N Not invited I Invited O Out of race							
Key: P Participant A Absent N Not invited I Invited O Out of race				Daniel Howell Jr.	Scott Kerr	Gloria Reyes	Satya Rhodes-Conway
1	January 30, 2023	Community associations (Note: Hosted by Midvale Heights Community Association, Sunset Village Community Association, Regent Neighborhood Association, Westmorland Neighborhood Association, Summit Woods Neighborhood Association, University Hill Farms Association, and Crawford Marlborough Nakoma Neighborhood)	YouTube	N	P	P	P
2	January 31, 2023	Urban League of Greater Madison (Note: Co-hosted by NAACP Dane County Branch, 100 Black Men of Madison, and Wisconsin Interfaith Voter Engagement.)	YouTube	N	P	P	P
3	February 27, 2023	Wisconsin Policy Forum (Note: Co-hosted by Downtown Madison, Inc.)	YouTube	N	O	P	P

=== Endorsements ===
Satya Rhodes-Conway

U.S. representatives

- Mark Pocan, WI-2 (2013–present)

County officials

- Richard Kilmer, former Dane County supervisor from the 4th district (2016–2020)
- Patrick Miles, chair of the Dane County Board of Supervisors from the 34th district (2006–present)
- Joe Parisi, Dane County executive (2011–present) and former state assemblyman from the 48th district (2005–2011)

Madison alders

- Juliana Bennett, 8th ward (2021–present)
- Patrick Heck, 2nd ward (2019–present)
- Sabrina Madison, 17th ward (2022–present)
- Erik Paulson, 3rd ward (2022–present)
- Mike Verveer, 4th ward (1995–present)

Madison school board members

- Savion Castro, 2nd ward (2019–present)
- Ali Muldrow, 4th ward (2019–present)
- Nicki Vander Meulen, 7th ward (2017–present)

Editorial boards

- The Badger Herald
- The Capital Times

Labor unions

- American Federation of Teachers Wisconsin
- Madison Teachers Incorporated
- Wisconsin AFL-CIO

Organizations

- 314 Action
- Citizen Action of Wisconsin - affiliate of People's Action
- EMILY's List
- Fair Wisconsin PAC
- LGBTQ Victory Fund
- LPAC
- Planned Parenthood Advocates of Wisconsin - affiliate of Planned Parenthood Action Fund
- Progressive Change Campaign Committee
- Wisconsin League of Conservation Voters

Political parties

- Dane County Democratic Party (co-endorsement with Reyes)
Gloria Reyes

County officials

- Kalvin Barrett, Dane County sheriff (2021–present)

Local officials

- David Couper, former chief of the Madison Police Department (1972–1993)
- Christina Gomez Schmidt, Madison school board member from the 6th ward (2004–2023)
- Barbara Harrington-McKinney, Madison alder from the 1st ward (2015–2023)
- Ananda Mirilli, former Madison school board member from the 5th ward (2019–2022)
- Paul Soglin, former mayor of Madison (1973–1979, 1989–1997, and 2011–2019)
- Noble Wray, former chief of the Madison Police Department (2004–2013)

Editorial boards

- Wisconsin State Journal

Labor unions

- Madison Professional Police Officers Association

Political parties

- Dane County Democratic Party (co-endorsement with Rhodes-Conway)

=== Results ===
2023 Madison mayoral primary results
Candidate	Votes	%
Satya Rhodes-Conway (incumbent)	43,822	59.5
Gloria Reyes	20,507	27.9
Scott Kerr	8,658	11.8
Write-ins (Note: Includes Daniel Howell Jr., who ran as a write-in candidate.)	608	0.8
Total votes	73,595	100
Undervotes	2,141	2.83
Turnout	75,736	39%

2023 Madison mayoral runoff results
Candidate	Votes	%
Satya Rhodes-Conway (incumbent)	63,066	55.2
Gloria Reyes	50,402	44.1
Write-ins	755	0.7
Total votes	114,223	100
Undervotes	6,170	5.12
Turnout	120,393	63%

== 2027 ==
2027 Madison mayoral election
- February 16, 2027 (primary); April 6, 2027 (general)
Party	Nonpartisan	Nonpartisan
Incumbent Mayor
Satya Rhodes-Conway
Democratic

The 2027 Madison mayoral election will be held April 6, 2027 to elect the mayor of Madison, Wisconsin, with a primary on February 16, 2027. Incumbent mayor Satya Rhodes-Conway ran for re-election to a third term but withdrew from the race in October 2026.

=== Candidates ===
==== Declared ====
- Syed Abbas, former president of the Madison Common Council (2022) from the 12th district (2019–2022) and candidate for Wisconsin's 46th Assembly district in 2022
- Brian Benford, former Madison Common Council alder from the 6th district (2021–2023) and candidate for Wisconsin's 26th Senate district in 2020
- Kaleem Caire, founder and CEO of One City Schools
- Jonny Hinds, businessman
- April Kigeya, former Dane County supervisor from the 15th district (2022–2026)
- Larry Williams, hospitality and food service director

==== Publicly expressed interest ====
- Jason Ilstrup, president of Downtown Madison Inc.

==== Potential ====
- Sabrina Madison, president of the Madison Common Council (2026–present) from the 17th district (2022–present) (previously endorsed Rhodes-Conway)
- Scott Resnick, former Madison Common Council alder from the 8th district (2011–2015) and runner-up for mayor in 2015
- Regina Vidaver, Madison Common Council alder from the 5th district (2021–present) (previously endorsed Rhodes-Conway)

==== Withdrawn ====
- Satya Rhodes-Conway, incumbent mayor

==== Declined ====
- Francesca Hong, state assemblymember from the 76th district (2021–present) and candidate for governor of Wisconsin in 2026 (endorsed Rhodes-Conway)
- Noble Wray, former Madison chief of police (endorsed Caire)

=== Endorsements ===
Kaleem Caire

Local officials

- Susan Bauman, former mayor of Madison (1997–2003)
- Dave Cieslewicz, former mayor of Madison (2003–2011)
- Joe Sensenbrenner, former mayor of Madison (1983–1989) (candidate's campaign treasurer)

Individuals

- Gloria Ladson-Billings, professor
- Noble Wray, former Madison chief of police
April Kigeya

Local officials

- Dana Pellebon, former Dane County supervisor
Satya Rhodes-Conway (withdrawn)

State legislators

- Francesca Hong, state assemblymember from the 76th district (2021–present)

Local officials

- Sabrina Madison, president of the Madison Common Council (2026–present) from the 17th district (2022–present)
- Regina Vidaver, Madison Common Council alder from the 5th district (2021–present)
- 8 other alders
