= Madison City Channel =

Cable television station in Wisconsin

- United States
- City: Madison, Wisconsin

Links
- Website: www.cityofmadison.com/citychannel

The Madison City Channel (MCC) is a Government-access television (GATV) cable television station operated by the City of Madison, Wisconsin. The channel airs live and archived meetings and events involving the governments of the City of Madison and Dane County; reports and announcements from and profiles of government officials and representatives; and programs on current events, issues, and services that affect the city and area.

The channel originally aired on Channel 12 of Charter Communications Madison cable system (where it was commonly known by City Channel 12 or CitiCable 12). On September 30, 2008, the channel moved to Channel 98 on Charter's basic analog tier and Channel 994 on the digital tier. An aborted relocation plan in August 2008 would have seen the channel move to the digital-only tier, a move allowed by a provision in the Video Competition Act that was passed by Wisconsin's legislature in 2007; the move faced objections from the member stations of the Wisconsin Association of Public, educational, and government access (PEG) channels.

== History ==
In June 2001, the MCC website launched an indexing system which allowed users to go directly to listed agenda items in its Madison Common Council video streams. Tom Alesia of the Wisconsin State Journal called the update "the future of online TV" and station manager Brad Clark said they might be the first American channel to implement it.
