= Dave Cieslewicz =

American politician

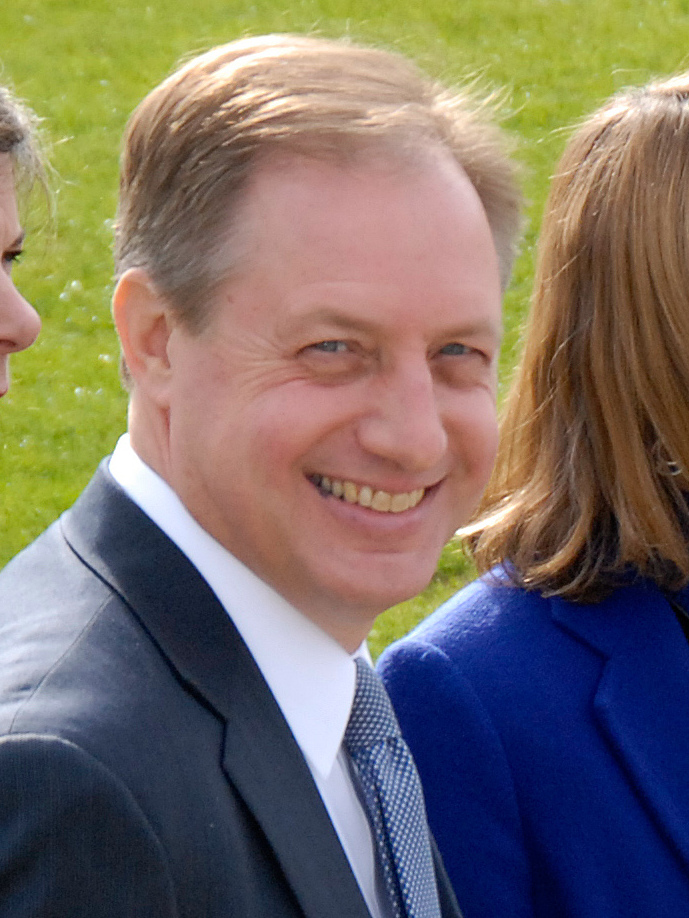
- Cieslewicz in 2009

55th Mayor of Madison
- In office April 22, 2003 – April 19, 2011
- Preceded by: Susan Bauman
- Succeeded by: Paul Soglin

Personal details
- Born: February 17, 1959 (age 67) West Allis, Wisconsin, U.S.
- Party: Democratic
- Other political affiliations: Progressive Dane
- Spouse: Dianne Cieslewicz
- Education: University of Wisconsin, Madison

David J. Cieslewicz (/tʃɛsˈlɛvɪtʃ/; Polish pronunciation: [t͡ɕɛɕˈlevit͡ʂ]; born February 17, 1959), commonly referred to as Mayor Dave during his term, is an American politician who was the mayor of Madison, Wisconsin from 2003 to 2011. He is a member of the Democratic Party.

== Personal life and early career ==
Cieslewicz was born and grew up in the Milwaukee suburb of West Allis, and came to Madison as a student at the University of Wisconsin–Madison. He is of Polish descent and was raised in what he identified as a Polish neighborhood. His wife is Dianne Cieslewicz, who worked as chief of staff to state Senator Fred Risser, and they reside in the Regent Street neighborhood on Madison's near-west side.

Prior to seeking the mayor's office, Cieslewicz was executive director of "1000 Friends of Wisconsin", a land use advocacy organization that lobbied for Wisconsin's Smart Growth planning law. He was also a staffer in the Wisconsin State Legislature, a lobbyist for the Nature Conservancy, and an elected member of the Dane County Board of Supervisors. He lost a state Assembly race in 1992 to Tammy Baldwin, she later became a U.S. Senator.

== Election ==
Cieslewicz replaced Susan J. M. Bauman as mayor of Madison in 2003, after defeating activist and former mayor Paul Soglin in a close contest. He was re-elected to a second four-year term in 2007, defeating Republican Ray Allen, a businessman. In 2011, Cieslewicz ran for a third term as mayor losing in a tight race to opponent, former Mayor Paul Soglin, whom he had defeated in 2003.

== Accomplishments in office ==
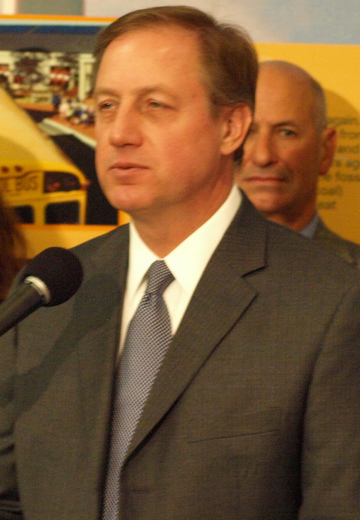
Cieslewicz in 2009

- In conjunction with former Alderperson Brenda Konkel, the city enacted a mandatory inclusionary zoning ordinance, which required most new housing developments to provide 15% of their units at affordable prices to people of modest incomes in exchange for density bonuses and other incentives. The mayor announced in his April 2009 state of the city address that this initiative had been a failure.
- A municipal minimum wage was enacted in March, 2004 with the leadership of Alder Austin King. Scaled to rise to $7.75 per hour by 2008 and thereafter to be indexed to inflation, Madison's wage ordinance made it the fourth city in the country with its own minimum standard. Madison's efforts prompted Milwaukee, La Crosse, and Eau Claire to establish their own municipal minimum wages. This resulted in a statewide compromise in May 2005, where Wisconsin's minimum wage rose to $6.50 per hour in exchange for prohibiting wage modifications at the municipal level.
- Updates to city infrastructure were implemented, including new automated recycling and refuse collection programs, a merger of the city's civil rights departments, the creation of a comprehensive city planning process, and the creation of the city's first municipal swimming pool.
- Cieslewicz supported an initiative that defeated the opening of a casino in Madison.
- Cieslewicz and the city council implemented a citywide smoking ban, that prohibited smoking in any public space, including bars and taverns. The ban went into effect in July 2005.
- He was a member of the Mayors Against Illegal Guns Coalition, a bi-partisan group with a goal of "making the public safer by getting illegal guns off the streets."
- Cieslewicz launched the New Cities Project, an organization of mayors and chiefs of staff dedicated to fostering progressive metropolitan leadership.

== Political activity ==
In the 2004 presidential election, Cieslewicz endorsed John Edwards the week before the Wisconsin presidential primary. Edwards finished second, behind Sen. John Kerry.

Cieslewicz endorsed Edwards again in the 2008 campaign. When Edwards withdrew from the race, Cieslewicz endorsed Barack Obama.

=== Criticism ===
Cieslewicz was criticized for firing city employees through budget reshuffling; he eliminated a job through budget cuts, but then created a similar job with a different title. Madison's bicycle-pedestrian safety coordinator, Arthur Ross was fired in this way, in a move supported by the Wisconsin Bicycle Federation. Cieslewicz became executive director of Wisconsin Bicycle Federation after his 2011 mayoral defeat.

A gag rule used by Madison's Parks Department to limit employees' access to the press and to alders was compared to a practice used by Cieslewicz's own office. Former alderman Ken Golden accused Cieslewicz of being a bully towards his staff and city employees. In response to those critics, Cieslewicz unveiled in December 2004 a vision for economic development with support from the Chamber of Commerce, the Economic Development Commission, the Convention and Visitors Bureau, and other business organizations.

Political offices
Preceded by Susan Bauman	Mayor of Madison; 2003–2011	Succeeded by Paul Soglin
