= Satya Rhodes-Conway =

American politician (born 1971)

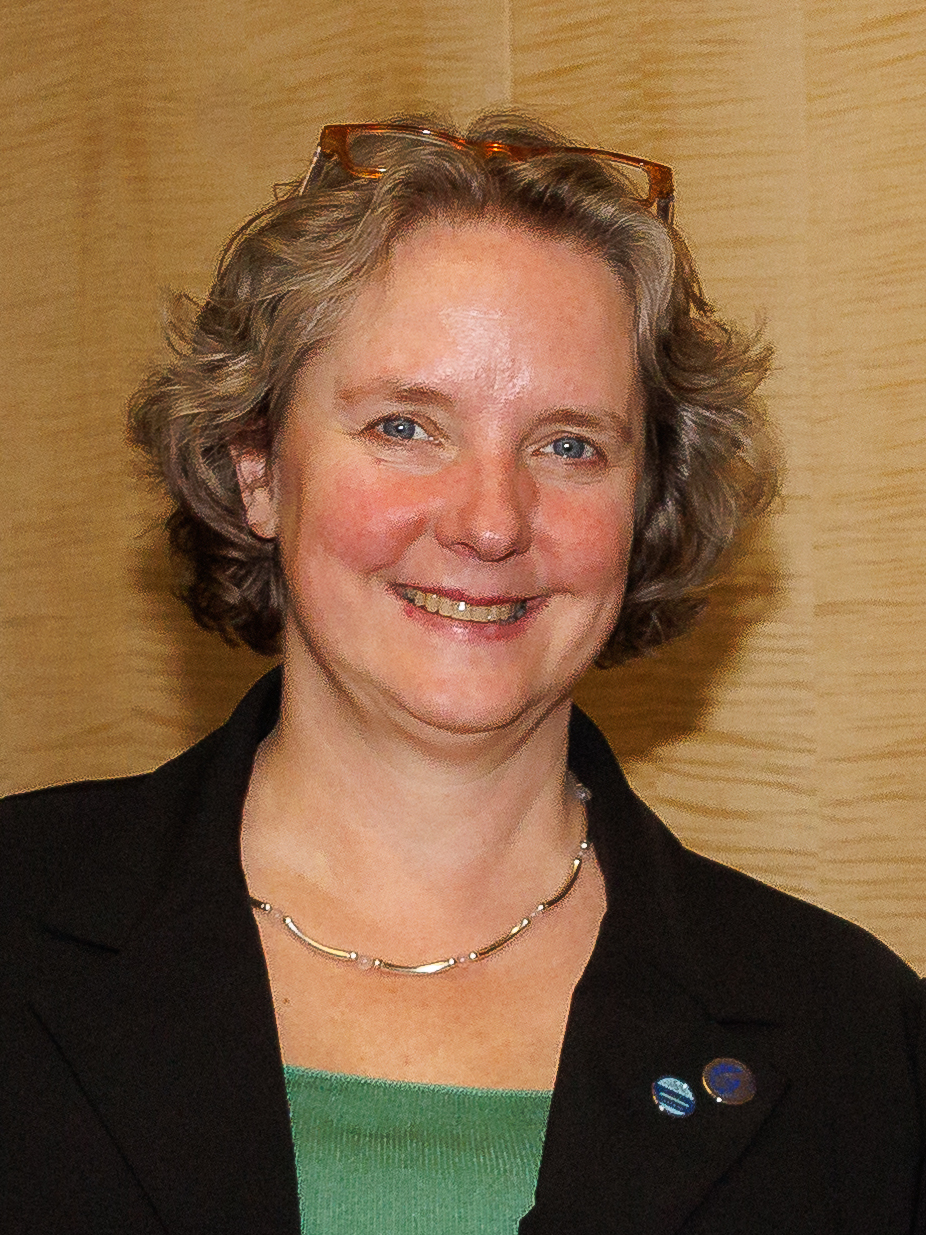
- Rhodes-Conway in 2024

57th Mayor of Madison
- Incumbent
- Assumed office April 16, 2019
- Preceded by: Paul Soglin

Member of the Madison Common Council from the 12th district
- In office April 2007 – April 2013
- Preceded by: Brian Benford
- Succeeded by: Larry Palm

Personal details
- Born: November 3, 1971 (age 54) Española, New Mexico, U.S.
- Party: Democratic
- Other political affiliations: Progressive Dane
- Education: Smith College (BS); University of California, Irvine (MS)
- Website: City website

Satya Rhodes-Conway (born November 3, 1971) is an American politician who has served since 2019 as the 57th mayor of Madison, Wisconsin. A member of the Democratic Party and Progressive Dane, she previously served on the Madison Common Council from 2007 to 2013. First elected in 2019 and re-elected in 2023, Rhodes-Conway is the first out lesbian elected as a mayor in Wisconsin, and the second woman to become mayor of Madison.

== Early life and career ==
Satya Rhodes-Conway was born in 1971, in Española, New Mexico, and raised in Ithaca, New York. She attended Smith College and earned a master's degree from the University of California, Irvine. Rhodes-Conway moved to Madison, Wisconsin, around 2000. She worked at the State Environmental Resource Center, as a senior associate with the University of Wisconsin's Center on Wisconsin Strategy, and served on several municipal committees, as chair of the Long Range Metro Transit Ad Hoc Planning Committee, and a subcommittee member of the Commission on the Environment. Rhodes-Conway became managing director of the University of Wisconsin–Madison Mayors Innovation Project in 2005.

== Madison City Council (2007–2013) ==
From 2007 through 2013, Rhodes-Conway served two terms as an alder (city councilor) on the Madison Common Council. Her campaigns for alder saw Rhodes-Conway receive endorsements from the Green Party of the United States, the Progressive Dane party and the Democratic Party in bids for political office. She began campaigning for Brian Benford's open seat on the Madison Common Council in December 2006, and was one of nine new alders elected to the Madison Common Council in 2007. Rhodes-Conway announced in November 2012 that she would not run for reelection, and stepped down from the position upon the end of her third term in April 2013. She was succeeded in office by Larry Palm.

== 2019 Madison mayoral election ==
Rhodes-Conway announced that she would run for the mayorship in May 2018. She and incumbent mayor Paul Soglin were the top two finishers in a primary held on February 19, 2019. The 2019 mayoral primary was Madison's most expensive, as six candidates raised a total of $453,365; $83,331 of that total was raised by Rhodes-Conway's campaign. Rhodes-Conway finished second, 323 votes behind Soglin, to advance to the general election.

Rhodes-Conway's campaign focused on a short list of issues, including bringing bus rapid transit to Madison, increasing the supply of affordable housing, combatting climate change, and promoting racial equity. During the primary, Rhodes-Conway's support came largely from the Isthmus and neighboring wards. Debates between Rhodes-Conway and Soglin covered a number of topics, including affordable housing, the municipal economy, public safety, and policing. Rhodes-Conway won support from Wisconsin State Assemblywoman Terese Berceau and Dane County Executive Joe Parisi. She was subsequently endorsed by the Wisconsin State Journal editorial board, The Capital Times, and The Daily Cardinal. Throughout the campaign, Rhodes-Conway raised more money than Soglin, and spent more on expenditures. Milwaukee County Executive Chris Abele spent $47,000 on mailings supportive of Rhodes-Conway's mayoral bid, an amount described by the Wisconsin State Journal as "unusual, if not unprecedented," due to its origin outside of Dane County.

Rhodes-Conway defeated Soglin in the April 2, 2019, election, earning victory with over 61 percent of the vote. Voter turnout was approximately 36 percent. Rhodes-Conway's electoral victory was driven by large margins in the Isthmus, Near East Side, and West Side. She managed to flip wards in the Far East Side and West Side, parts of the city that previously voted for Soglin. In a ward near Capitol Square, Rhodes-Conway won by a 68.5-point margin. She is the second woman to be elected mayor of Madison and the first openly gay person elected to the office. Lori Lightfoot was elected Mayor of Chicago on the same day Rhodes-Conway won Madison's mayoral election. Former Mayor of Houston Annise Parker stated that both victories "leave us well-positioned to make 2019 the year of the lesbian mayor."

== Mayor of Madison (2019–present) ==
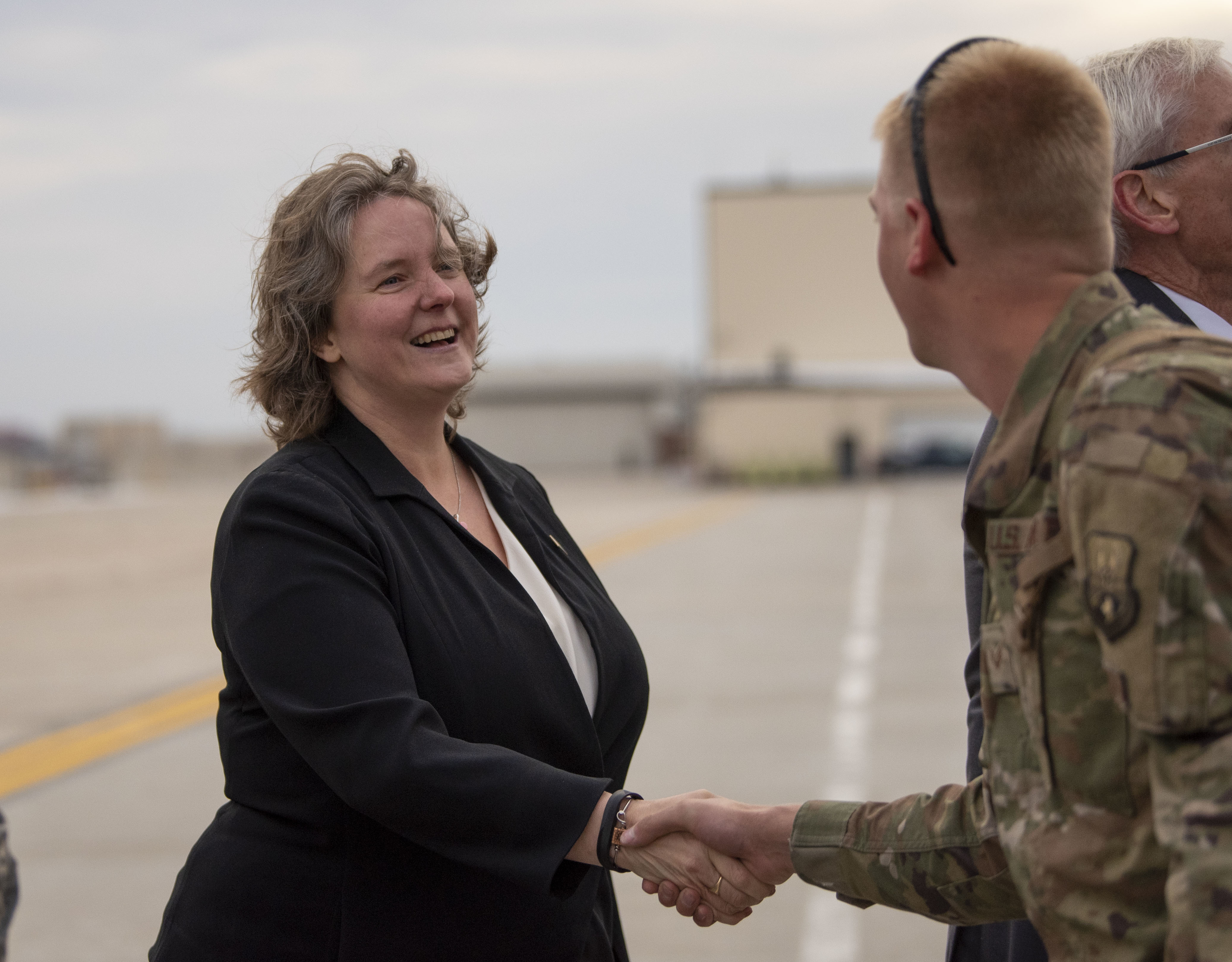
Rhodes-Conway greeting a U.S. Air Force Airman who was returning from service in Afghanistan, in November 2019

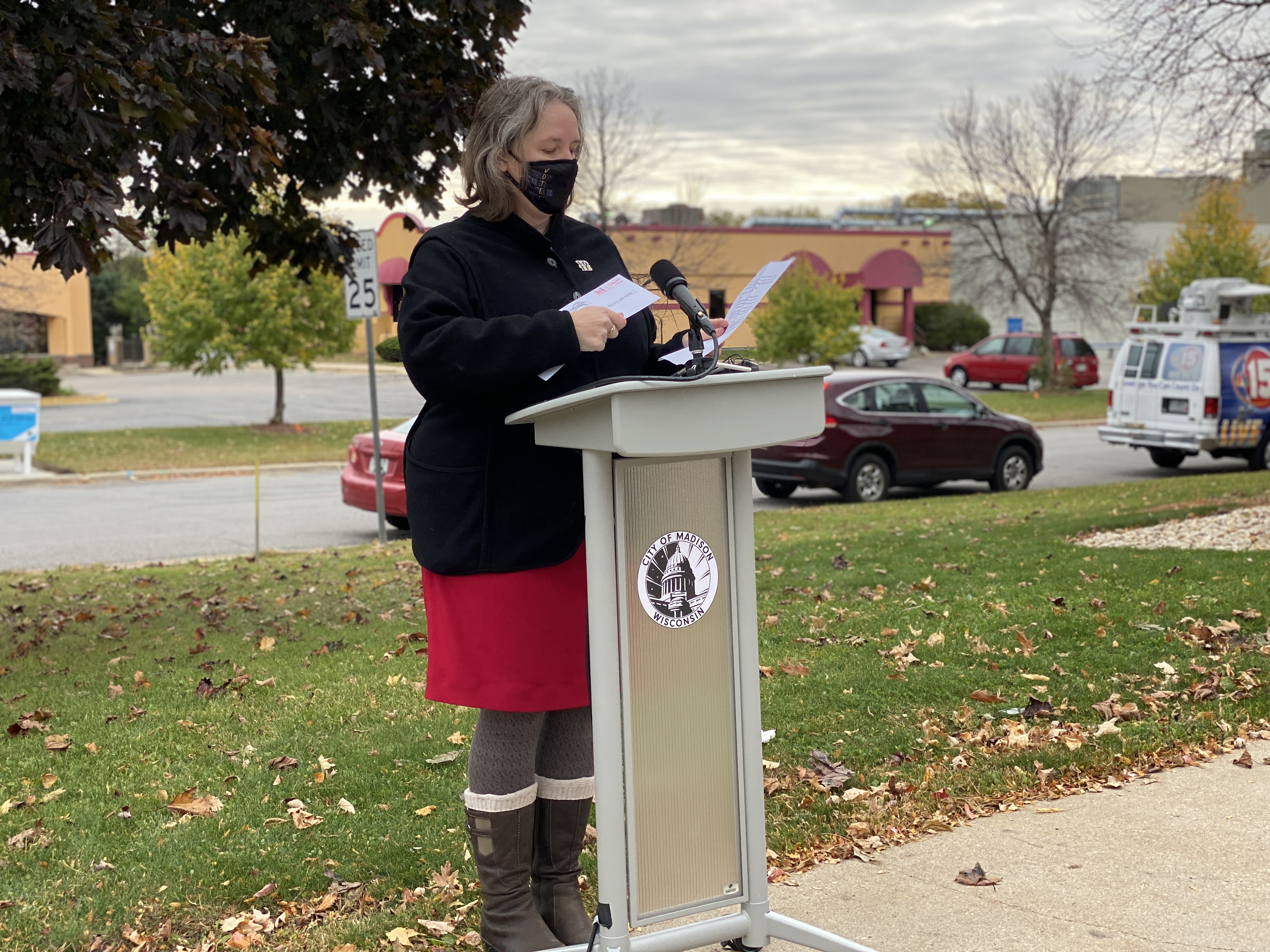
Rhodes-Conway speaking in October 2020

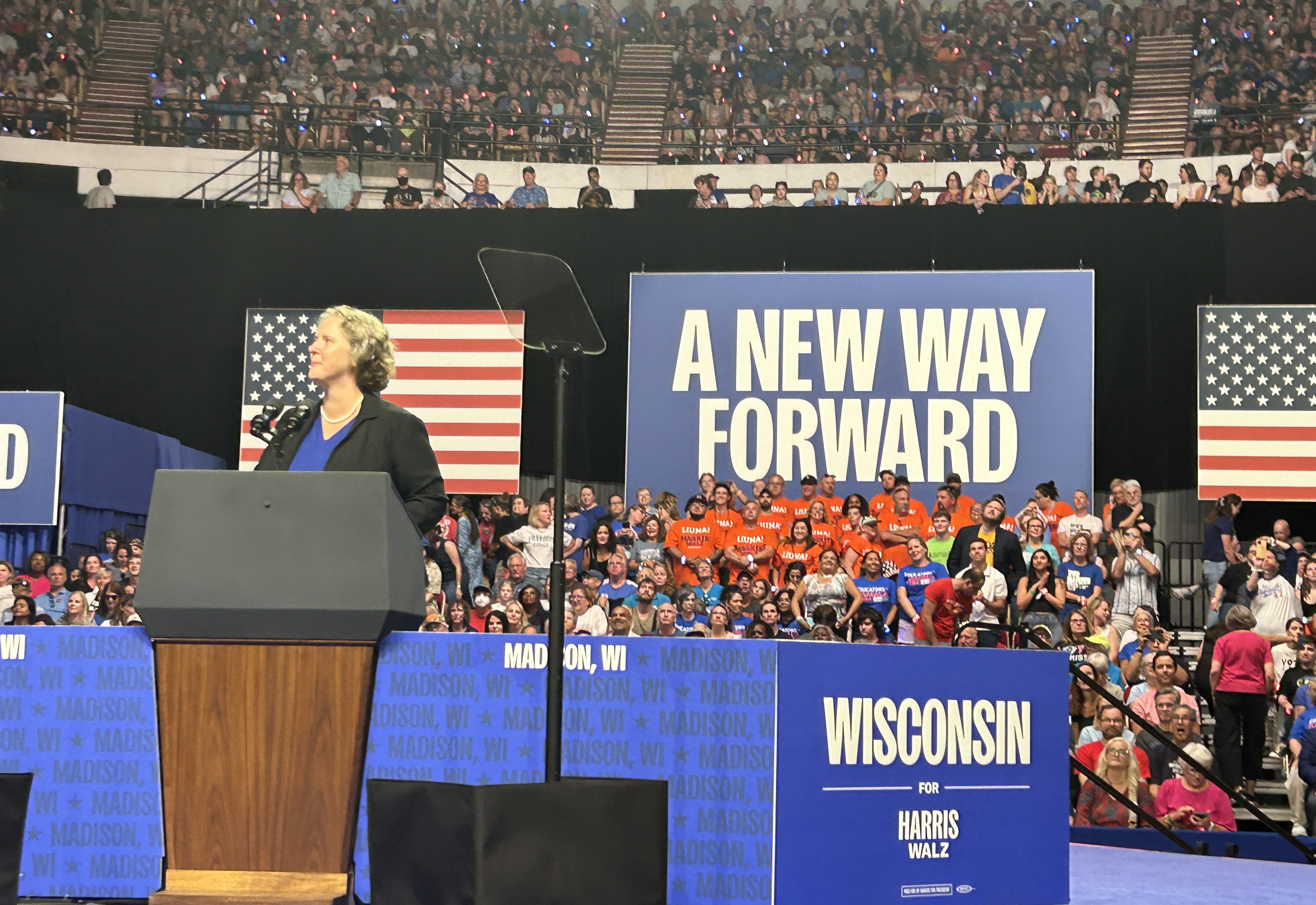
Rhodes-Conway speaking at the Alliant Energy Center during a September 2024 rally for Kamala Harris' presidential campaign

Rhodes-Conway was inaugurated as mayor of Madison on April 16, 2019. On her first day as mayor, she held a joint press conference with Dane County Executive Joe Parisi to announce a maintenance and reconstruction agreement for Buckeye Road. It was a compromise that Parisi could not work out with Soglin in the months preceding the election.

Rhodes-Conway stuck to the agenda she campaigned on in 2019 when she defeated long-time incumbent Mayor Paul Soglin. Her accomplishments in her first term faced considerable opposition—particularly zoning changes intended to increase housing density and a Bus Rapid Transit system, which prompted a redesign of the entire Metro system. Rhodes-Conway was re-elected in 2023.

=== Response to George Floyd protests ===
Starting in May 2020, protests spread across the United States in response to the murder of George Floyd. Protests in Madison began on May 30. Initially, Rhodes-Conway seemed supportive of the demonstrations, stating "George Floyd should be alive tonight and the fact that he isn't, is an American tragedy... I also want to say that I completely agree with the protestors that were around the Capitol square and right here in front of this building earlier today. I agree with their message, I agree with their right to protest and I agree with how determinedly and peacefully they protested today."

However, after protesters were tear-gassed by police on the first night of demonstrations, tensions escalated. Alice Herman, writing for Tone Madison, recounted that "As protesters—chanting 'hands up, don't shoot,' and repeating George Floyd's name—advanced from the campus end of State Street toward the Capitol, cops formed barricades across the street, repeatedly deploying tear gas to route the advancing protesters into side streets. The tear gas set off panicked stampedes, which were the most frightening and dangerous moments of the day." Multiple Madison alders released a statement condemning the tear-gassing of protesters. The next day, Rhodes-Conway declared a state of emergency and imposed a 9:30 pm curfew on the isthmus area of the city, stating "I want to be clear that this is in response to a number of people endangering themselves and others by shattering glass, destroying property, and engaging in widespread, systematic looting of local businesses."

On June 3, Rhodes-Conway released a password-protected video, intended only for consumption by Madison Police Department members; however, the video was leaked to the public. In the video, Rhodes-Conway stated "You must be exhausted. I know I am, and you're facing a much more difficult situation than I am. It must be absolutely infuriating to stand in heavy gear outside while listening to people constantly insult your chosen profession... You are not what the protesters say you are. I know that... I was so focused on the task of addressing the concerns of our community that I didn't remember that you need and deserve both recognition and appreciation." The video was leaked in a Facebook group.

Rhodes-Conway publicly apologized for the statements made in the leaked video, saying "Black lives matter. I believe deeply in this and yet I failed to center this in my message to the police department... I realize I may have done irreparable harm with my actions, and I realize too that I may have permanently lost any trust I had." In response to the mayor's inability to take a solid stance on the protest, a recall effort was launched in July 2020. However, it failed to gather enough signatures in the allotted timeframe.

== Personal life ==
Satya Rhodes-Conway's mother, Anne Rhodes, is an artist. Her father, Bob Conway, is a manager of art collections. Her parents divorced when she was five years old, and her mother subsequently came out as a lesbian. Satya Rhodes-Conway and Amy Klusmeier have been partners since 2009.

Political offices
Preceded by Paul Soglin	Mayor of Madison; 2019–present	Incumbent
