= Nonpartisan =

Nonpartisan or non-partisan may refer to:

== General political concepts ==
- Nonpartisanship, also known as Nonpartisanism, co-operation without reference to political parties
- Non-partisan democracy, an election with no official recognition of political parties
- Nonpartisan politician, independent or non-party politician

== Specific political parties ==
- Nonpartisan Bloc for Cooperation with the Government, Second Polish Republic (1927–1935)
- Nonpartisan League, North Dakota, USA (1915–1956)
- Non-Partisan Association, Vancouver, British Columbia, Canada (since 1937)
- Alberta Non-Partisan League, Alberta, Canada (1916–1919)
- Non-Partisan Deputies, Norway (1997–2017)
- Non-Partisan Independent Group, 1930s fraction of the Conservative Party of British Columbia, Canada
- The non-partisans, a 1910s Zionist workers movement
- Non-Partisan Solidarity Union, Taiwan

== See also ==
- Partisan (disambiguation)
