= John B. Heim =

American politician

John B. Heim (July 15, 1848 – November 2, 1919) was an American politician.

Heim was born in Rochester, New York. He moved to Madison, Wisconsin in 1858 and was in the bookbinding business. In 1881, Heim served on the Madison Common Council and was also Mayor of Madison, Wisconsin from 1912 to 1913. In 1915, Heim served in the Wisconsin State Assembly and was a Democrat. Heim died in Madison, Wisconsin.
