= F. Joseph Sensenbrenner Jr. =

20th century American politician

Joe Sensenbrenner

52nd Mayor of Madison, Wisconsin
- In office April 1983 – April 18, 1989
- Preceded by: Joel Skornicka
- Succeeded by: Paul Soglin

Deputy Attorney General of Wisconsin
- In office March 1981 – April 1983
- Governor: Martin J. Schreiber; Lee S. Dreyfus
- Preceded by: David Hanson
- Succeeded by: Edward Garvey

Personal details
- Born: Frank Joseph Sensenbrenner Jr. 1948 (age 77–78) Appleton, Wisconsin
- Party: Democratic
- Spouse: Mary Ellyn Drury (m. 1976)
- Children: 2 sons
- Relatives: Jim Sensenbrenner (2nd cousin)
- Education: Williams College (B.A.); University of Pennsylvania Law School (J.D.)
- Profession: management consultant, attorney

Frank Joseph "Joe" Sensenbrenner Jr. (born 1948) is a retired American attorney, management consultant, and Democratic politician. He was the 52nd Mayor of Madison, Wisconsin, serving from 1983 to 1989, and held high-ranking offices in the state government, serving as executive secretary and legal advisor to Governor Patrick J. Lucey, and as Deputy Attorney General of Wisconsin under Bronson La Follette. He is currently President of the Board of Rooted, a non-profit organization which works to encourage healthy and sustainable neighborhoods in Madison.

== Early life and education ==
Born into a well-off family in Appleton, Wisconsin, Sensenbrenner graduated from Georgetown Preparatory School, a Jesuit boarding school in North Bethesda, Maryland. He received his bachelor's degree in classics and political economy from Williams College in 1970, and went on to earn his J.D. from University of Pennsylvania in 1973.

== Career ==
Before his third year in law school, in the summer of 1972, Sensenbrenner went to work in the Wisconsin state government as an intern for the Health Policy and Planning Task Force. After being admitted to the State Bar of Wisconsin, Sensenbrenner was employed as a pardon and extradition counsel to Governor Patrick J. Lucey, and was soon promoted to legal advisor to the Governor. He briefly left the Governor's office to accept a role as an Assistant Attorney General in the Wisconsin Department of Justice, but returned to Lucey's office in December 1975 when he was appointed executive secretary and chief of staff. He served with Lucey until his resignation, and then returned to the Wisconsin Department of Justice as an Assistant Attorney General for local government issues. He was subsequently promoted to Deputy Attorney General in 1981 by Attorney General Bronson La Follette. He remained in the job until his election as Mayor of Madison in April 1983.

In December 1982, incumbent Madison Mayor Joel Skornicka announced he would not run for a third term. Two weeks later, Sensenbrenner announced his candidacy. Sensenbrenner quickly earned the endorsement of the outgoing Mayor and inherited many of his campaign supporters and staff. Sensenbrenner's campaign emphasized his experience in state government and management skills, and, in the crowded 8-person nonpartisan primary, he came in a close second to former alderman and past mayoral candidate Robert Reynolds. Reynolds and Sensenbrenner faced off in the April election, with both running on a liberal Democratic platform. Sensenbrenner continued to emphasize his managerial acumen, while Reynolds focused more on his desire to lead and motivate the city's various constituencies. Sensenbrenner prevailed with 53% of the vote in the April general election. Sensenbrenner went on to win reelection in 1985, taking 73% of the vote, and again in 1987.

In 1989, Sensenbrenner sought reelection while advocating for a proposed convention center on Lake Monona. Sensenbrenner was challenged by former Mayor Paul Soglin, who had served six years as mayor in the 1970s, and four other candidates. He faced attacks throughout the race on the prioritization of the convention center, seen as a luxury pavilion for the city's elites, over the interests and services for working class downtown and near-downtown districts. Sensenbrenner barely survived the February primary, with only 50 votes separating him from 3rd place finisher Rick Berg. Also on the April election ballot was a city referendum for raising property taxes to pay for Sensenbrenner's proposed convention center. Sensenbrenner and the referendum were defeated by a similar margin. Despite the setback for the convention center, it did eventually get built. New-Mayor Paul Soglin quickly reversed his position from the campaign and the convention center, now known as Monona Terrace, was opened in 1997.

After leaving government, Sensenbrenner started a management consulting business, Sensenbrenner Associates, and offered his services to businesses and governments. He retired in 2009.

== Personal life and family ==
Sensenbrenner is a great-grandson and inheritor of Wisconsin industrialist Frank Jacob Sensenbrenner, the 2nd President of the Kimberly-Clark corporation and a former President of the University of Wisconsin Board of Regents. Jim Sensenbrenner, who represented Wisconsin for 21 terms in the United States House of Representatives, is a second cousin of Joe Sensenbrenner.

He married Mary Ellyn Drury of Portage, Wisconsin, on May 22, 1976, at St. Mary's Catholic Church in Portage. At the time of their wedding, he was executive secretary to Governor Lucey and she was an attorney for the Office of the State Insurance Commissioner. They have two adult sons and still reside in Madison.

Outside of politics and business, Sensenbrenner became involved in several nonprofits, serving on the boards of the Grassroots Leadership College, the Bartell Community Theatre, and the Urban Open Space Foundation, which pushed the development of Madison's McPike Park in 1999. Sensenbrenner is still President of the Board of the nonprofit Rooted, the successor organization to the Urban Open Space Foundation.

== Electoral history ==
=== Madison Mayor (1983–1989) ===
1983 Madison mayoral election
| Party | Candidate | Votes | % |
|---|---|---|---|
Nonpartisan primary (February 15, 1983)
| Nonpartisan | Robert Reynolds | 7,394 | 37.66% |
| Nonpartisan | Joseph Sensenbrenner | 6,961 | 35.45% |
| Nonpartisan | Michael Briggs | 3,397 | 17.30% |
| Nonpartisan | Michael Ducey | 1,018 | 5.18% |
| Nonpartisan | Carol Gainer | 341 | 1.74% |
| Nonpartisan | Thomas Byrne | 291 | 1.48% |
| Nonpartisan | Douglas Wanberg | 126 | 0.64% |
| Nonpartisan | Syed Ameen | 108 | 0.55% |
| Plurality | | 433 | 2.21% |
| Total votes | | 19,636 | 100.0% |
General election (April 5, 1983)
| Nonpartisan | Joseph Sensenbrenner | 22,025 | 52.94% |
| Nonpartisan | Robert Reynolds | 19,575 | 47.06% |
| Plurality | | 2,450 | 5.89% |
| Total votes | | 41,600 | 100.0% |

1985 Madison mayoral election
| Party | Candidate | Votes | % |
|---|---|---|---|
General election (April 2, 1985)
| Nonpartisan | Joseph Sensenbrenner (inc.) | 24,536 | 73.49% |
| Nonpartisan | Alex Cunningham | 8,852 | 26.51% |
| Plurality | | 15,684 | 46.97% |
| Total votes | | 33,388 | 100.0% |

1987 Madison mayoral election
| Party | Candidate | Votes | % |
|---|---|---|---|
General election (April 7, 1987)
| Nonpartisan | Joseph Sensenbrenner (inc.) | 36,341 | 67.48% |
| Nonpartisan | Mary Kay Baum | 17,510 | 32.52% |
| Plurality | | 18,831 | 34.97% |
| Total votes | | 53,851 | 100.0% |

1989 Madison mayoral election
| Party | Candidate | Votes | % |
|---|---|---|---|
Nonpartisan primary (February 21, 1989)
| Nonpartisan | Paul Soglin | 15,600 | 39.31% |
| Nonpartisan | Joseph Sensenbrenner (inc.) | 10,575 | 26.65% |
| Nonpartisan | Richard Berg | 10,526 | 26.52% |
| Nonpartisan | Eugene Parks | 1,841 | 4.64% |
| Nonpartisan | John Roussos | 892 | 2.25% |
| Nonpartisan | Dennis DeNure | 251 | 0.63% |
| Plurality | | 5,025 | 12.66% |
| Total votes | | 39,685 | 100.0% |
General election (April 4, 1989)
| Nonpartisan | Paul Soglin | 34,537 | 56.79% |
| Nonpartisan | Joseph Sensenbrenner (inc.) | 26,280 | 43.21% |
| Plurality | | 8,257 | 13.58% |
| Total votes | | 60,817 | 100.0% |

Political offices
| Preceded by Joel Skornicka | Mayor of Madison, Wisconsin; April 1983 – April 18, 1989 | Succeeded by Paul Soglin |
Legal offices
| Preceded by David Hanson | Deputy Attorney General of Wisconsin; March 1981 – April 1983 | Succeeded by Edward Garvey |
