= Non-Partisans (pre-state Zionist political movement) =

The non-partisans הבלתי מפלגתיים
- Leader: Berl Katznelson, Yitzhak Tabenkin, David Remez
- Dissolved: February 1919
- Merged into: Ahdut HaAvoda
- Ideology: Labor Zionism

The non-partisans (Hebrew: הבלתי מפלגתיים) was a labor Zionist social movement of workers in Palestine at the beginning of the 20th century.

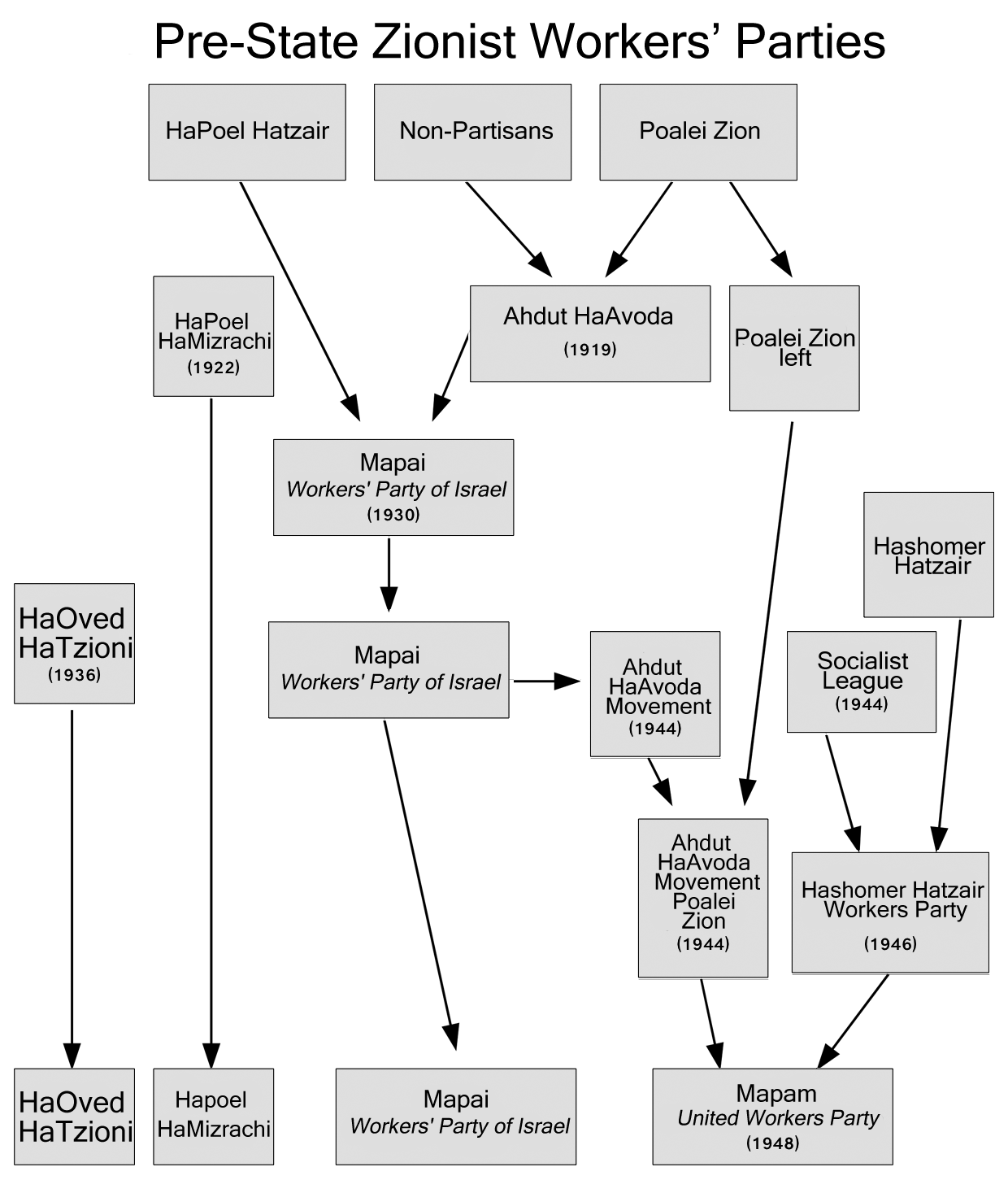
chart of zionist workers parties

It acted as a "third force" in the labor Zionist movement during the second and third aliyah periods, alongside the workers who were organized within the Poalei Zion and Hapoel Hatzair parties. Most of the financial and political power of those parties came from the Jewish diaspora.

Some of the workers who immigrated in the second aliyah did not find their place in either of the parties that had existed until then. For some it was due to ideological differences and for others, due to the desire to establish themselves independently in Palestine, without the affiliations and disputes that guided the parties and that were related to the Jewish public in the Diaspora (the question of the Hebrew language as a cultural language in the Diaspora for example, or the connection with the Socialist International).

The prominent non-partisan leaders were Berl Katznelson, Yitzhak Tabenkin, David Remez and Shmuel Yavnieli.

Their main activity in the Yishuv was the establishment of multiple workers unions (Histadrut Poalei Yehuda, Histadrut Poalei Ha'Galil, Histadrut Poalei Ha'Shomron - all which merged into the Histadrut), organizations that ensured the independent settlement of workers, the welfare of the workers and social and health insurance for the workers.

In February 1919, the Non-Partisans and the Poalei Zion Party merged and created Ahdut HaAvoda. A step which contributed to the establishment of the Histadrut.
