= Joel Skornicka =

American politician (1937–2019)

51st Mayor of Madison, Wisconsin
- In office April 18, 1979 – April 17, 1983
- Preceded by: Paul Soglin
- Succeeded by: F. Joseph Sensenbrenner Jr.

Personal details
- Born: January 29, 1937
- Died: November 16, 2019 (aged 82)
- Political party: Independent
- Education: University of Wisconsin–Madison
- Profession: Assistant Chancellor

Joel Skornicka (January 29, 1937 – November 16, 2019) was Mayor of Madison, Wisconsin from 1979 to 1983. Prior to becoming Mayor, he served as Assistant Chancellor of the University of Wisconsin-Madison. Skornicka received his bachelor's degree in political science in 1958 and his master's degree in public policy and administration in 1975, from University of Wisconsin–Madison He was an Independent.
