= Equity and inclusion in education =

Principle of equal access for learners

Equity and inclusion in education refers to the principle or policy that provides equal access for all learners to curriculum and programming within an educational setting. Some school boards have policies that include the terms inclusion and diversity. Equity is a term sometimes confused with equality. Equity and inclusion policy provide a framework for educators and academic administrators that guides training and delivery of instruction and programming. School boards use equity and inclusion principles to promote the use of resources that reflect the diversity of students and their needs. Diversity and inclusion is important in the classroom for multiple reasons There are children that come from all different walks of life. Everybody situation is not the same and we need to be culturally aware of that and be mindful.

Children have the inherent right to education as determined by the Goal 4 targets of the United Nations. In the past, equity and inclusion referred primarily to students with mental and/or physical challenges that prevented them from learning in regular classrooms. The principle now applies to marginalized students who live with any type of intersectionality based on their social identity. The capabilities approach introduced by Martha Nussbaum and Amartya Sen supports the ideal that each learner should be offered the freedom to choose from the alternative ways they learn and to do it as a shared experience, with the interaction of their peers.

It has been shown that schools that are able to implement inclusive and equitable practices tend to be more successful if they have endorsement or support at the regional and national levels of government. Besides the need for infrastructure and resources, cultural attitudes and beliefs strongly influence the creation and sustainability of effective programming in schools.

== Defining terms ==
In education, diversity refers to quantifying the number of different social groups represented in a school or schools within a school board. Examples of social groups could include LGBTQ+, females, and non-binary youth. Inclusion speaks to the qualitative experience that students have. Inclusion means students are able to express their authentic selves in the learning space and still have access to all learning opportunities. Equity refers to the concept of providing fair access to programming and learning opportunities based on the differing needs of each student. Equality refers to all students having access to programming and learning opportunities.

== History ==
In 1990, the United Nations created the Education for All (EFA) Declaration. This was a recognition of the inequalities faced by children all over the world in the provision of quality education. Inequalities are created by cultural, geographic, and political factors that continue today to impede equal access to education. In 1994, the World Conference on Special Needs in Salamanca, Spain put a focus on the aims of the EFA principles by recommending educational policy reform. The United Nations has encapsulated educational reform as target goals to be reached by 2030. These goals encompass all aspects of creating access to education: infrastructure, programs, teacher training, and scholarships, among others.
