= Susan J. M. Bauman =

American politician

54th Mayor of Madison, Wisconsin
- In office April 15, 1997 – April 22, 2003
- Preceded by: Paul Soglin
- Succeeded by: Dave Cieslewicz

Personal details
- Party: Democratic
- Education: University of Wisconsin Law School
- Profession: Lawyer, educator

Susan J. M. Bauman is an American attorney and former politician. She was the 54th mayor of Madison, Wisconsin, and the first woman to be elected mayor of that city.

== Biography ==
Bauman worked as an 8th grade mathematics teacher in the Madison Public School system for eight years, and became President of the teachers' union, Madison Teachers, Incorporated (MTI). Bauman, along with MTI Executive Director John Matthews, led a two-week strike commencing January 5, 1976. Two years later, Bauman left teaching and pursued a Juris Doctor degree, graduating from the University of Wisconsin Law School in 1981. After serving for twelve years as an Alderperson on the Madison City Council, Bauman was elected Mayor on April 1, 1997 to fill the unexpired term of Paul Soglin, who resigned to run for Congress. Two years later, on April 6, 1999, Bauman was elected to a full four-year term, having defeated Eugene Parks. In 2003, Bauman sought re-election, but failed to place among the top two candidates in the primary election, and was therefore not on the ballot for the general election. She was succeeded by Dave Cieslewicz.

On April 18, 2003, shortly after her electoral defeat, Wisconsin Governor Jim Doyle announced the appointment of Bauman to serve as a Commissioner on the Wisconsin Employment Relations Commission. Bauman served from June 1, 2003 until May 20, 2011.

Political offices
Preceded by Paul Soglin	Mayor of Madison, Wisconsin; 1997 - 2003	Succeeded by Dave Cieslewicz
