= Madison Common Council =

City government of Madison, Wisconsin, US

City of Madison Common Council

Type
- Type: Part-time Mayor-Council
- Houses: Unicameral

Leadership
- Mayor: Satya Rhodes-Conway
- President: Sabrina Madison
- Vice President: Carmella Glenn

Structure
- Seats: 21 (Including the Mayor)
- Length of term: 2 Years

Elections
- Voting system: Plurality by District

Meeting place
- City-County Building | 210 Martin Luther King, Jr. Blvd. Room 201

Website
- https://www.cityofmadison.com/council/

Madison Common Council is a city council of the legislative branch of the government of the City of Madison in Wisconsin. The Madison Common Council consists of 20 alderpersons elected from 20 districts who serve two-year terms. The Common Council considers ordinances and resolutions whose subject matter includes traffic codes, taxes and housing regulations, among other issues. The Council's presiding officer is the Mayor of Madison, who chairs meetings.

District	Member	First Term
1st	Devine O. Nzegwu	2026
2nd	Will Ochowicz	2025
3rd	Derek Field	2023
4th	Mike Verveer ^	1995
5th	Regina Vidaver ^	2021
6th	Davy Mayer	2025
7th	Badri Lankella	2025
8th	Ellen Zhang	2026
9th	Joann Pritchett	2025
10th	Yannette Figueroa Cole ^	2021
11th	Bill Tishler	2022
12th	Julia Matthews	2025
13th	Tag Evers	2019
14th	Noah Lieberman	2026
15th	Dina Nina Martinez-Rutherford	2023
16th	Sean O'Brien	2025
17th	Sabrina Madison *	2022
18th	Carmella Glenn **	2025
19th	John P. Guequierre	2024
20th	Barbara Harrington-McKinney	2015

* = Common Council President

** = Common Council Vice President

^ = Former Common Council President

^^ = Former Common Council Vice President

== Salary ==
Council Members currently receive $12,692 a year in base salary, the Council Vice President receives $13,692, and the Council President receives $15,444.

== History ==
The City of Madison was incorporated on March 7, 1856 and the first elections were held four days later on March 11. The Madison Common Council first met on April 7, 1856. There were twelve members of the inaugural council, three members elected from four wards. Council terms were for one year, however, the top vote getter in each ward was elected to a two year term. Subsequent elections were held on the first Monday of March, though this date was changed to the first Tuesday of April beginning in 1860, and remains so today. Over the next few decades additional wards and seats on the council were added as Madison grew. In 1887, the city charter was amended and the number of council members was reduced to two per ward, each serving two years terms but elected in alternating years. By 1932 the Madison Common Council had grown to twenty members from ten wards, and by a charter ordinance approved by the voters in the April 1932 election, the Council reorganized into a twenty ward, twenty member council with one alder per ward starting in 1933. The terms remained two years but the elections were staggered, so members from even numbered wards were elected in even numbered years and members from odd numbered wards were elected in odd numbered years.

In November 1946, voters approved a referendum that transitioned the city to a council-manager form of government, with a smaller, seven member council. Each council member of the smaller council was elected at-large from the entire city starting in the spring 1947 elections. The configuration was short-lived, and a citizen-initiated referendum was approved in November 1950 to switch back to the previous system of an elected mayor and a twenty member council elected from twenty different wards beginning in April 1951. The 1951 election elected all twenty members for a two year term, though another ordinance change in November 1952 restored the staggered elections and half the council was elected each year for a two year term starting in 1953.

In 1957, near the end of a long-running annexation battle with the Town of Madison, the twenty-first ward was added to the council, and in 1963 the council expanded once more to add the twenty-second ward. The city, somewhat inadvertently, switched back to electing all members at once via the 1972 and 1973 elections, with the half of the council up in the 1972 election elected to a one year term, and then all seats elected to two years terms beginning in the 1973 elections. (The plan had been to use the one year election in 1972 to bring all seats up at the same time in 1973 and then re-stagger, but delays in redistricting led the Council to stick to two year terms for all members. A 1972 state redistricting law also changed the term “ward” to “district.” Beginning in the April 1993 election, Madison returned to a twenty member council, and beginning in the April 2025 election, Madison returned to staggered council elections, with half of the council up for reelection each year, again with even numbered districts elected in even numbered years and odd numbered districts elected in odd numbered years.

== Notable former members ==
- Tammy Baldwin – U.S. senator from Wisconsin and former U.S. representative
- Paul Soglin – former mayor of Madison
- Lisa Subeck – member of the Wisconsin State Assembly
- Samba Baldeh – former member of the Wisconsin State Assembly
- Susan J. M. Bauman – former mayor of Madison
- Albert G. Schmedeman – 28th governor of Wisconsin
- John B. Heim – former mayor of Madison
- Ricardo González (politician) – first openly gay Latino elected to public office in the United States
- Archie Simonson - former Dale County judge, removed in the first ever successful judicial recall petition in Wisconsin
