= 2018 United States Senate election in Wisconsin =

- November 6, 2018
- Turnout: 61.2% ▼
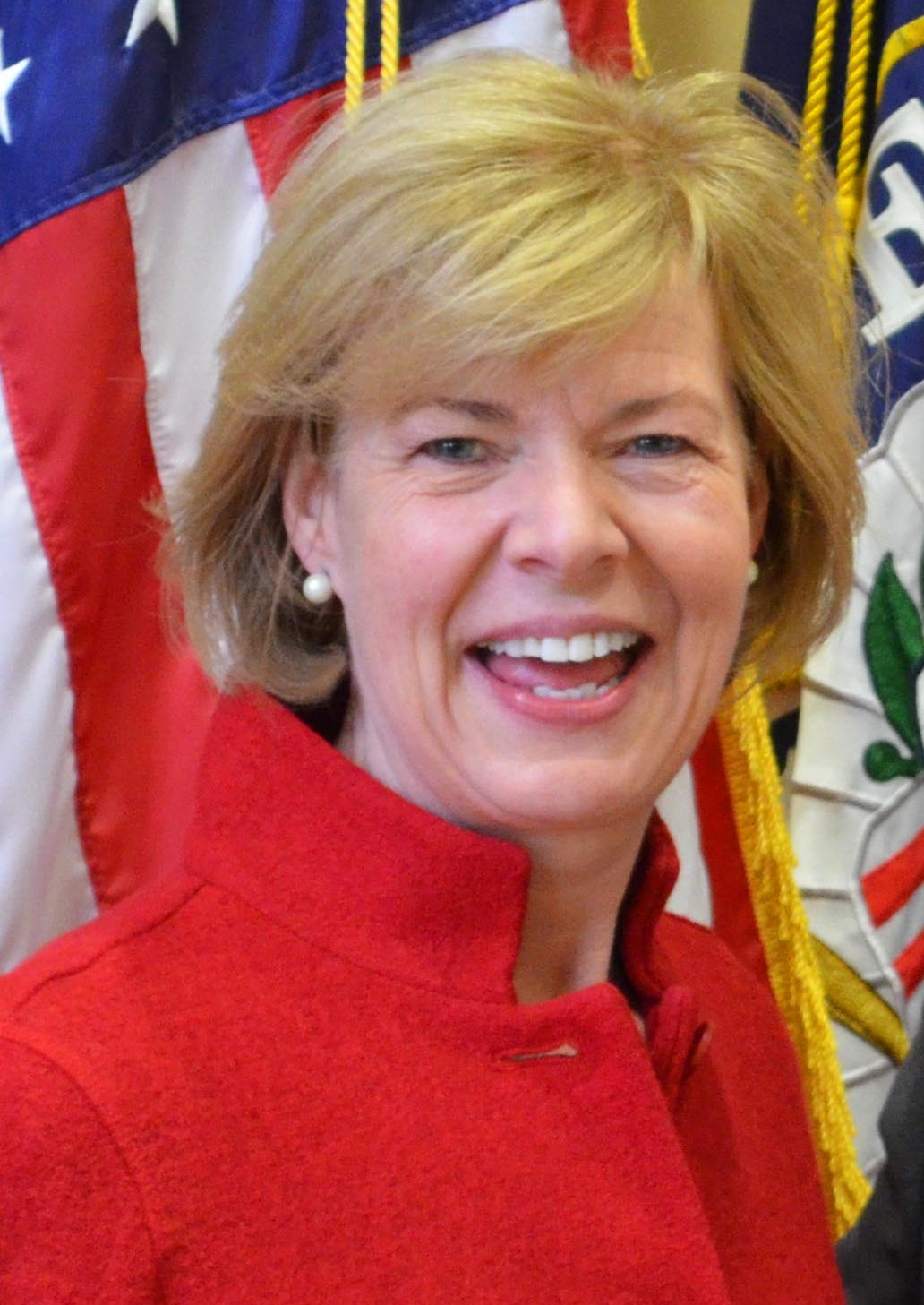

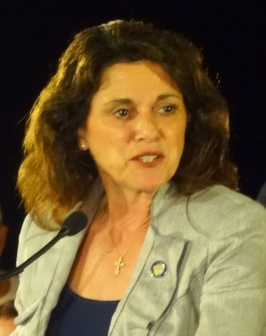
Nominee	Tammy Baldwin	Leah Vukmir
Party	Democratic	Republican
Popular vote	1,472,914	1,184,885
Percentage	55.36%	44.53%
- Baldwin: 40–50% 50–60% 60–70% 70–80% 80–90% >90% Vukmir: 50–60% 60–70% 70–80% 80–90% >90% Tie: 40–50% 50% No data
U.S. senator before election
Tammy Baldwin
Democratic
Elected U.S. Senator
Tammy Baldwin
Democratic

The 2018 United States Senate election in Wisconsin took place on November 6, 2018, to elect a member of the U.S. Senate from Wisconsin. This election coincided with a gubernatorial election, U.S. House elections and various other state and local elections. Incumbent Democratic senator Tammy Baldwin won re-election to a second term, defeating Republican nominee Leah Vukmir by more than 10 percentage points. This was one of ten Democratic-held Senate seats up for election in a state Donald Trump won in the 2016 presidential election. The primary elections were held on August 14, with a filing deadline on June 1. Baldwin was unopposed for the Democratic nomination, while Vukmir defeated Charles Barman, Griffin Jones, George Lucia and Kevin Nicholson in the Republican primary.

== Democratic primary ==
=== Candidates ===
==== Nominee ====
- Tammy Baldwin, incumbent U.S. senator

=== Endorsements ===
Tammy Baldwin

U.S. senators

- Cory Booker, U.S. senator from New Jersey (2013-present)
- Tammy Duckworth, U.S. senator from Illinois (2017-present)
- Dick Durbin, U.S. senator from Illinois (1997-present), Senate Minority Whip (2015-2021)
- Russ Feingold, former U.S. senator from Wisconsin (1993-2011)
- Al Franken, former U.S. senator from Minnesota (2009-2018)
- Kamala Harris, U.S. senator from California (2017-2021)
- Maggie Hassan, U.S. senator from New Hampshire (2017-present)
- Doug Jones, U.S. senator from Alabama (2018-2021)
- Catherine Cortez Masto, U.S. senator from Nevada (2017-present)
- Jeff Merkley, U.S. senator from Oregon (2009-present)
- Gary Peters, U.S. senator from Michigan (2015-present)
- Bernie Sanders, U.S. senator from Vermont (2007-present) (Independent)
- Elizabeth Warren, U.S. senator from Massachusetts (2013-present)
- Sheldon Whitehouse, U.S. senator from Rhode Island (2007-present)

Organizations

- Council for a Livable World
- Democracy for America
- EMILY's List
- End Citizens United
- J Street
- League of Conservation Voters
- LegitAction
- MoveOn.org
- National Organization for Women
- Natural Resources Defense Council
- Planned Parenthood Action Fund
- Sierra Club

=== Results ===
Democratic primary results
Party	Candidate	Votes	%
Democratic	Tammy Baldwin (incumbent)	510,812	99.64%
Write-in		1,848	0.36%
Total votes		512,660	100%

== Republican primary ==
=== Candidates ===
==== Nominee ====
- Leah Vukmir, state senator and State Senate Assistant Majority Leader

==== Eliminated in primary ====
- Charles Barman
- Griffin Jones
- George Lucia
- Kevin Nicholson, businessman and member of the Wisconsin Board of Veterans Affairs

==== Declined ====
- David Clarke, former Milwaukee County sheriff
- Sean Duffy, U.S. representative (running for reelection)
- Scott Fitzgerald, State Senate Majority Leader
- Mike Gallagher, U.S. representative
- Glenn Grothman, U.S. representative
- Eric Hovde, businessman and candidate for the U.S. Senate in 2012
- Rebecca Kleefisch, lieutenant governor of Wisconsin
- Dale Kooyenga, state representative
- Nicole Schneider, businesswoman
- Duey Stroebel, state senator
- Charlie Sykes, talk radio host
- Scott Walker, governor of Wisconsin (running for reelection)

=== Endorsements ===
Kevin Nicholson

Federal officials

- Steve Bannon, White House Chief Strategist (2017), executive chairman of Breitbart News
- John Bolton, 25th Ambassador to the United Nations (2005–2006)

U.S. senators

- Ted Cruz, U.S. senator from Texas (2013–present)
- Mike Lee, U.S. senator from Utah (2011–present)

State legislators

- Jesse Kremer, state assemblyman from the 59th district (2015–2019)
- David Zien, state senator from the 23rd district (1993–2007)

Organizations

- Club for Growth
- FreedomWorks
- Great America PAC
- Madison Project
- Senate Conservatives Fund
- Tea Party Patriots
- Wisconsin Family Action
- Wisconsin Right to Life

Newspapers

- Kenosha News
Leah Vukmir

Federal officials

- Reince Priebus, 27th White House Chief of Staff (2017)

U.S. representatives

- Sean Duffy, U.S. representative from Wisconsin's 7th congressional district (2011–2019)
- Glenn Grothman, U.S. representative from Wisconsin's 6th congressional district (2015–present)
- Paul Ryan, 54th Speaker of the House (2015–2019), U.S. representative from Wisconsin's 1st congressional district (1999–2019)
- Jim Sensenbrenner, U.S. representative from Wisconsin's 5th congressional district (2003–2021)

State officials

- Matt Adamczyk, 35th state treasurer of Wisconsin (2015–2019)
- Margaret Farrow, 42nd lieutenant governor of Wisconsin (2001–2003)

State legislators

- Scott Allen, state assemblyman from the 97th district (2015–present)
- Joan Ballweg, state assemblywoman from the 41st district (2005–2021)
- Kathy Bernier, state assemblywoman from the 68th district (2011–2019)
- Mark Born, state assemblyman from the 39th district (2013–present)
- Janel Brandtjen, state assemblyman from the 22nd district (2015–present)
- Ed Brooks, state assemblyman from the 50th district (2009–2019)
- Robert Brooks, state assemblyman from the 60th district (2015–present)
- Dave Craig, state senator from the 28th district (2017–2021)
- Alberta Darling, state senator from the 8th district (1993–2022)
- Mary Felzkowski, state assemblywoman from the 35th district (2013–2021)
- Dan Feyen, state senator from the 18th district (2017–present)
- Scott Fitzgerald, Wisconsin State Senate Majority Leader (2013-2021), state senator from the 13th district (1995-2021)
- Rick Gundrum, state assemblyman from the 58th district (2018-present)
- Cody Horlacher, state assemblyman from the 33rd district (2015-2023)
- André Jacque, state assemblyman from the 2nd district (2011-2019)
- John Jagler, state assemblyman from the 37th district (2013-2021)
- Adam M. Jarchow, state assemblyman from the 28th district (2015-2019)
- Dan Kapanke, state senator from the 32nd district (2005-2011)
- Terry Katsma, state assemblyman from the 26th district (2015-present)
- Samantha Kerkman, state assemblywoman from the 61st district (2013-2022)
- Joel Kitchens, state assemblyman from the 1st district (2015-present)
- Joel Kleefisch, state assemblyman from the 38th district (2005-2019)
- Dan Knodl, state assemblyman from the 24th district (2009-present)
- Dean Knudson, state assemblyman from the 30th district (2011-2017)
- Scott Krug, state assemblyman from the 72nd district (2011-present)
- Mike Kuglitsch, state assemblyman from the 84th district (2011-2022)
- Bob Kulp, state assemblyman from the 69th district (2013-2021)
- Mary Lazich, Wisconsin Senate President (2015-2017), state senator from the 28th district (1998-2017)
- Devin LeMahieu, state senator from the 9th district (2015-present)
- Amy Loudenbeck, state assemblywoman from the 31st district (2013-2023), 45th district (2011-2013)
- John Macco, state assemblyman from the 88th district (2015-present)
- Howard Marklein, Wisconsin Senate President Pro Tempore (2017-2021), state senator from the 17th district (2015-present)
- Dave Murphy, state assemblyman from the 56th district (2013-present)
- Stephen Nass, state senator from the 11th district (2015-present)
- Adam Neylon, state senator from the 98th district (2013-present)
- John Nygren, state assemblyman from the 89th district (2007-2020)
- Luther Olsen, state senator from the 14th district (2005-2021)
- Jim Ott, state assemblyman from the 23rd district (2007-2021)
- Jerry Petrowski, state senator from the 29th district (2012-present)
- Treig Pronschinske, state assemblyman from the 92nd district (2017-present)
- Romaine Quinn, state assemblywoman from the 75th district (2015-2021)
- Mike Rohrkaste, state assemblyman from the 55th district (2015-2021)
- Roger Roth, Wisconsin Senate President (2017-2021), state senator from the 19th district (2015-present)
- Joe Sanfelippo, state assemblyman from the 15th district (2013-2023)
- Michael Schraa, state assemblyman from the 53rd district (2013-present)
- Ken Skowronski, state assemblyman from the 82nd district (2014-2023)
- Patrick Snyder, state assemblyman from the 85th district (2017-present)
- John Spiros, state assemblyman from the 86th district (2013-present)
- Rob Stafsholt, state assemblyman from the 29th district (2017-2021)
- David Steffen, state assemblyman from the 4th district (2015-present)
- Jim Steineke, Wisconsin Assembly Majority Leader (2015-2022), state assemblyman from the 5th district (2011-2022)
- Duey Stroebel, state senator from the 20th district (2015-present)
- Rob Swearingen, state assemblyman from the 34th district (2013-present)
- Gary Tauchen, state assemblyman from the 6th district (2007-2023)
- Patrick Testin, state senator from the 24th district (2017-present)
- Jeremy Thiesfeldt, state assemblyman from the 52nd district (2011-2023)
- Travis Tranel, state assemblyman from the 49th district (2011-present)
- Van Wanggaard, state senator from the 21st district (2015-present)
- Tom Weatherston, state assemblyman from the 62nd district (2013-2019)
- Chuck Wichgers, state assemblyman from the 83rd district (2017-2023)
- Shannon Zimmerman, state assemblyman from the 30th district (2017-present)

Local officials

- Dave Ament, mayor of New Berlin
- David Beth, Kenosha County sheriff
- Christopher Bossert, Washington County supervisor
- John Bulawa, Washington County supervisor
- Michael Crowley, Waukesha County supervisor
- Paul Decker, Waukesha County board chairman
- Paul Farrow, Waukesha County executive (2015-present)
- Tyson Fettes, Racine County register of deeds
- Adam Gerol, Ozaukee County district attorney
- Tricia Hanson, Racine County district attorney
- Darlene Johnson, Waukesha County supervisor
- Bob Long, St. Croix County supervisor
- Travis Nez, former Price County supervisor
- Michael Nieskes, St. Croix County district attorney
- Harley Raebe, Green Lake County supervisor
- Dale Schmidt, Dodge County sheriff
- Dan Sebring, Milwaukee County supervisor
- Lawrence Smith, Winnebago County supervisor
- Peter Sorce, Washington County supervisor
- John Spears, Vernon County sheriff
- Daniel P. Vrakas, Waukesha County executive (2005-2015)
- Chuck Wood, Waukesha County supervisor
- Fred Zaug, Waupaca County supervisor
- David Zimmerman, Waukesha County supervisor

Individuals

- Rachel Campos-Duffy, television personality
- Michael W. Grebe, philanthropist, lawyer, businessman and conservative activist
- John C. McAdams, professor at Marquette University
- Kevin Nicholson, veteran and former 2018 Senate candidate
- Tonette Walker, First Lady of Wisconsin (2011-2019)
- Jay Weber, WISN-AM talk show host

Organizations

- Maggie's List
- NRA Political Victory Fund
- Republican Party of Wisconsin
- RightNOW Women
- Wisconsin Family Action
- Wisconsin Right to Life
- Wisconsin Young Republicans

=== Polling ===
Poll source	Date(s) administered	Sample size	Margin of error	Kevin Nicholson	Leah Vukmir	Other	Undecided
Emerson College	July 26–28, 2018	238	± 6.5%	35%	35%	3%	27%
Marist College	July 15–19, 2018	355	± 6.1%	38%	28%	<1%	34%
Hodas & Associates (R) (Note: Poll sponsored by Restoration PAC, a conservative super PAC that supported Nicholson.)	July 12–16, 2018	600	± 3.0%	33%	20%	–	47%
Marquette University	July 11–15, 2018	266	± 7.0%	32%	34%	2%	30%
Marquette University	June 13–17, 2018	274	± 6.9%	37%	32%	1%	30%
Hodas & Associates (R)	June 7–12, 2018	600	± 3.0%	28%	14%	–	58%
The Tarrance Group (R) (Note: Poll sponsored by Wisconsin Next PAC, a conservative super PAC that supported Vukmir.)	May 31 – June 4, 2018	800	± 3.5%	29%	36%	–	35%
American Viewpoint (R) (Note: Poll sponsored by Vukmir's campaign.)	May 29–31, 2018	500	± 4.4%	32%	30%	–	–
Hodas & Associates (R)	April 30 – May 3, 2018	240	± 6.0%	46%	15%	–	–
WPA Intelligence (R) (Note: Poll sponsored by Nicholson's campaign.)	April 2–4, 2018	1,028	± 3.1%	45%	27%	–	28%
Marquette University	February 25 – March 1, 2018	243	± 8.2%	28%	19%	2%	49%
WPA Intelligence (R)	January 22–23, 2018	350	± 5.2%	48%	9%	1% (Note: John Schiess 1%)	42%
WPA Intelligence (R)	January 2–3, 2018	350	± 5.2%	27%	10%	2% (Note: John Schiess 2%)	60%
WPA Intelligence (R)	December 6–7, 2017	1,004	± 3.1%	30%	23%	2%	45%

Notes

Hypothetical polling

Poll source	Date(s) administered	Sample size	Margin of error	David Clarke	Sean Duffy	Undecided
Magellan Strategies (R)	February 15–16, 2017	300	± 5.7%	32%	26%	42%

==== Results ====
Results by county Vukmir: 60–70%; 50–60%; 40–50%; Nicholson: 30–40%; 40–50%; 50–60%; 60–70%

Republican primary results
Party	Candidate	Votes	%
Republican	Leah Vukmir	217,230	48.90%
Republican	Kevin Nicholson	191,276	43.06%
Republican	George Lucia	18,786	4.23%
Republican	Griffin Jones	8,699	1.96%
Republican	Charles Barman	7,959	1.79%
Write-in		303	0.07%
Total votes		444,253	100%

== General election ==
=== Endorsements ===
Leah Vukmir (R)

U.S. executive branch officials

- Mike Pence, 48th vice president of the United States (2017-2021)
- Reince Priebus, 27th White House Chief of Staff (2017)
- Condoleezza Rice, 66th United States Secretary of State (2005-2009)
- Donald Trump, 45th president of the United States (2017-2021)

U.S. senators

- Ron Johnson, U.S. senator from Wisconsin (2011-present)

U.S. representatives

- Sean Duffy, U.S. representative from Wisconsin's 7th congressional district (2011-2019)
- Glenn Grothman, U.S. representative from Wisconsin's 6th congressional district (2015-present)
- Paul Ryan, 54th Speaker of the House of Representatives (2015-2019), U.S. representative from Wisconsin's 1st congressional district (1999-2019)
- Jim Sensenbrenner, U.S. representative from Wisconsin's 5th congressional district (2003-2021)

State officials

- Matt Adamczyk, 35th state treasurer of Wisconsin (2015-2019)
- Margaret Farrow, 42nd lieutenant governor of Wisconsin (2001-2003)

State legislators

- Scott Allen, state assemblyman from the 97th district (2015-present)
- Joan Ballweg, state assemblywoman from the 41st district (2005-2021)
- Kathy Bernier, state assemblywoman from the 68th district (2011-2019)
- Mark Born, state assemblyman from the 39th district (2013-present)
- Janel Brandtjen, state assemblyman from the 22nd district (2015-present)
- Ed Brooks, state assemblyman from the 50th district (2009-2019)
- Robert Brooks, state assemblyman from the 60th district (2015-present)
- Dave Craig, state senator from the 28th district (2017-2021)
- Alberta Darling, state senator from the 8th district (1993-2022)
- Mary Felzkowski, state assemblywoman from the 35th district (2013-2021)
- Dan Feyen, state senator from the 18th district (2017-present)
- Scott Fitzgerald, Wisconsin State Senate Majority Leader (2013-2021), state senator from the 13th district (1995-2021)
- Rick Gundrum, state assemblyman from the 58th district (2018-present)
- Cody Horlacher, state assemblyman from the 33rd district (2015-2023)
- André Jacque, state assemblyman from the 2nd district (2011-2019)
- John Jagler, state assemblyman from the 37th district (2013-2021)
- Adam M. Jarchow, state assemblyman from the 28th district (2015-2019)
- Dan Kapanke, state senator from the 32nd district (2005-2011)
- Terry Katsma, state assemblyman from the 26th district (2015-present)
- Samantha Kerkman, state assemblywoman from the 61st district (2013-2022)
- Joel Kitchens, state assemblyman from the 1st district (2015-present)
- Joel Kleefisch, state assemblyman from the 38th district (2005-2019)
- Dan Knodl, state assemblyman from the 24th district (2009-2023)
- Dean Knudson, state assemblyman from the 30th district (2011-2017)
- Scott Krug, state assemblyman from the 72nd district (2011-present)
- Mike Kuglitsch, state assemblyman from the 84th district (2011-2022)
- Bob Kulp, state assemblyman from the 69th district (2013-2021)
- Mary Lazich, Wisconsin Senate president (2015-2017), state senator from the 28th district (1998-2017)
- Devin LeMahieu, state senator from the 9th district (2015-present)
- Amy Loudenbeck, state assemblywoman from the 31st district (2013-2023), 45th district (2011-2013)
- John Macco, state assemblyman from the 88th district (2015-present)
- Howard Marklein, Wisconsin Senate president Pro Tempore (2017-2021), state senator from the 17th district (2015-present)
- Dave Murphy, state assemblyman from the 56th district (2013-present)
- Stephen Nass, state senator from the 11th district (2015-present)
- Adam Neylon, state senator from the 98th district (2013-present)
- John Nygren, state assemblyman from the 89th district (2007-2020)
- Luther Olsen, state senator from the 14th district (2005-2021)
- Jim Ott, state assemblyman from the 23rd district (2007-2021)
- Jerry Petrowski, state senator from the 29th district (2012-present)
- Treig Pronschinske, state assemblyman from the 92nd district (2017-present)
- Romaine Quinn, state assemblywoman from the 75th district (2015-2021)
- Mike Rohrkaste, state assemblyman from the 55th district (2015-2021)
- Roger Roth, Wisconsin Senate president (2017-2021), state senator from the 19th district (2015-2023)
- Joe Sanfelippo, state assemblyman from the 15th district (2013-2023)
- Michael Schraa, state assemblyman from the 53rd district (2013-present)
- Ken Skowronski, state assemblyman from the 82nd district (2014-2023)
- Patrick Snyder, state assemblyman from the 85th district (2017-present)
- John Spiros, state assemblyman from the 86th district (2013-present)
- Rob Stafsholt, state assemblyman from the 29th district (2017-2021)
- David Steffen, state assemblyman from the 4th district (2015-present)
- Jim Steineke, Wisconsin Assembly Majority Leader (2015-2022), state assemblyman from the 5th district (2011-2022)
- Duey Stroebel, state senator from the 20th district (2015-present)
- Rob Swearingen, state assemblyman from the 34th district (2013-present)
- Gary Tauchen, state assemblyman from the 6th district (2007-2023)
- Patrick Testin, state senator from the 24th district (2017-present)
- Jeremy Thiesfeldt, state assemblyman from the 52nd district (2011-2023)
- Travis Tranel, state assemblyman from the 49th district (2011-present)
- Van Wanggaard, state senator from the 21st district (2015-present)
- Tom Weatherston, state assemblyman from the 62nd district (2013-2019)
- Chuck Wichgers, state assemblyman from the 83rd district (2017-2023)
- Shannon Zimmerman, state assemblyman from the 30th district (2017-present)

Local officials

- Dave Ament, mayor of New Berlin
- David Beth, Kenosha County sheriff
- Christopher Bossert, Washington County supervisor
- John Bulawa, Washington County supervisor
- Michael Crowley, Waukesha County supervisor
- Paul Decker, Waukesha County board chairman
- Paul Farrow, Waukesha County executive (2015-present)
- Tyson Fettes, Racine County register of deeds
- Adam Gerol, Ozaukee County district attorney
- Tricia Hanson, Racine County district attorney
- Darlene Johnson, Waukesha County supervisor
- Bob Long, St. Croix County supervisor
- Travis Nez, former Price County supervisor
- Michael Nieskes, Racine County district attorney
- Harley Raebe, Green Lake County supervisor
- Dale Schmidt, Dodge County sheriff
- Dan Sebring, Milwaukee County supervisor
- Lawrence Smith, Winnebago County supervisor
- Peter Sorce, Washington County supervisor
- John Spears, Vernon County sheriff
- Daniel P. Vrakas, Waukesha County executive (2005-2015)
- Chuck Wood, Waukesha County supervisor
- Fred Zaug, Waupaca County supervisor
- David Zimmerman, Waukesha County supervisor

Individuals

- Rachel Campos-Duffy, television personality
- Michael W. Grebe, philanthropist, lawyer, businessman and conservative activist
- John C. McAdams, professor at Marquette University
- Eric Trump, businessman and son of U.S. President Donald Trump
- Tonette Walker, First Lady of Wisconsin (2011-2019)
- Jay Weber, WISN-AM talk show host

Organizations

- Maggie's List
- Milwaukee Police Association
- NRA Political Victory Fund
- Republican Party of Wisconsin
- RightNOW Women
- U.S. Chamber of Commerce
- Wisconsin Family Action
- Wisconsin Right to Life
- Wisconsin Young Republicans
Tammy Baldwin (D)

Former U.S. executive branch officials

- Joe Biden, 47th vice president of the United States (2009-2017)
- Barack Obama, 44th president of the United States (2009-2017)

U.S. senators

- Cory Booker, U.S. senator from New Jersey (2013-present)
- Tammy Duckworth, U.S. senator from Illinois (2017-present)
- Dick Durbin, U.S. senator from Illinois (1997-present), Senate Minority Whip (2015-2021)
- Russ Feingold, U.S. senator from Wisconsin (1993-2011)
- Al Franken, U.S. senator from Minnesota (2009-2018)
- Kamala Harris, U.S. senator from California (2017-2021)
- Maggie Hassan, U.S. senator from New Hampshire (2017-present)
- Doug Jones, U.S. senator from Alabama (2018-2021)
- Catherine Cortez Masto, U.S. senator from Nevada (2017-present)
- Jeff Merkley, U.S. senator from Oregon (2009-present)
- Gary Peters, U.S. senator from Michigan (2015-present)
- Bernie Sanders, U.S. senator from Vermont (2007-present) (Independent)
- Elizabeth Warren, U.S. senator from Massachusetts (2013-present)
- Sheldon Whitehouse, U.S. senator from Rhode Island (2007-present)

U.S. representatives

- Joe Kennedy III, U.S. representative from Massachusetts's 4th congressional district (2013-2021)
- Gwen Moore, U.S. representative from Wisconsin's 4th congressional district (2005-present)
- Mark Pocan, U.S. representative from Wisconsin's 2nd congressional district (2013-present)

State officials

- Tony Evers, 26th Wisconsin Superintendent of Public Instruction (2009-2019) and nominee for governor of Wisconsin in 2018

State legislators

- Mandela Barnes, state assemblyman from the 11th district (2013-2017) and nominee for lieutenant governor of Wisconsin in 2018

Local officials

- Bill de Blasio, 109th mayor of New York City (2014-2021)

Individuals

- Stephanie Schriock, political strategist
- Amy Siskind, activist and writer
- Bradley Whitford, actor and activist

Organizations

- Alliance for Retired Americans
- Council for a Livable World
- Democracy for America
- EMILY's List
- End Citizens United
- Feminist Majority Political Action Committee
- J Street
- League of Conservation Voters
- LegitAction
- MoveOn.org
- National Committee to Preserve Social Security and Medicare
- National Organization for Women
- Natural Resources Defense Council
- Planned Parenthood Action Fund
- Population Connection
- Rachel's Action Network
- Run with Pride
- Sierra Club
- United Automobile Workers

=== Debates ===
- Complete video of debate, October 8, 2018
- Complete video of debate, October 13, 2018

=== Predictions ===
Source	Ranking	As of
The Cook Political Report	Likely D	October 26, 2018
Inside Elections	Safe D	November 1, 2018
Sabato's Crystal Ball	Likely D	November 5, 2018
Fox News (Note: The Fox News Midterm Power Rankings uniquely does not contain a category for Safe/Solid races)	Likely D	November 5, 2018
CNN	Likely D	November 5, 2018
RealClearPolitics	Lean D	November 5, 2018

=== Polling ===
View source data.

Poll source	Date(s) administered	Sample size	Margin of error	Tammy Baldwin (D)	Leah Vukmir (R)	Other	Undecided
Research Co.	November 1–3, 2018	450	± 4.6%	50%	39%	–	11%
Emerson College	October 29–31, 2018	604	± 4.1%	53%	44%	–	3%
Marquette University	October 24–28, 2018	1,154 LV	± 3.2%	54%	43%	–	1%
Marquette University	October 24–28, 2018	1,400 RV	± 3.0%	52%	42%	–	3%
Ipsos	October 12–18, 2018	1,193	± 3.0%	54%	39%	3%	5%
Public Policy Polling (D) (Note: Poll sponsored by Protect Our Care.)	October 10–11, 2018	816	± 3.4%	52%	42%	–	6%
Marquette University	October 3–7, 2018	799 LV	± 3.9%	53%	43%	–	2%
Marquette University	October 3–7, 2018	1,000 RV	± 3.6%	53%	42%	–	3%
Marist College	September 30 – October 3, 2018	571 LV	± 4.8%	54%	40%	1%	5%
Marist College	September 30 – October 3, 2018	781 RV	± 4.1%	53%	40%	1%	6%
Ipsos	September 14–24, 2018	1,109	± 3.0%	52%	39%	4%	5%
Marquette University	September 12–16, 2018	614 LV	± 4.4%	53%	42%	–	2%
Marquette University	September 12–16, 2018	800 RV	± 4.0%	52%	40%	–	4%
Suffolk University	August 18–24, 2018	500	± 4.4%	50%	42%	–	8%
Marquette University	August 15–19, 2018	601 LV	± 4.5%	49%	47%	–	2%
Marquette University	August 15–19, 2018	800 RV	± 4.0%	51%	43%	–	4%
Emerson College	July 26–28, 2018	632	± 4.2%	50%	36%	4%	10%
Marist College	July 15–19, 2018	906	± 3.8%	55%	38%	1%	6%
SurveyMonkey/Axios	June 11 – July 2, 2018	968	± 4.5%	56%	40%	–	4%
Marquette University	June 13–17, 2018	800	± 4.0%	49%	40%	–	8%
Public Policy Polling (D)	March 15–16, 2018	910	± 3.3%	51%	39%	–	10%

Hypothetical polling

with Kevin Nicholson

Poll source	Date(s) administered	Sample size	Margin of error	Tammy Baldwin (D)	Kevin Nicholson (R)	Other	Undecided
Emerson College	July 26–28, 2018	632	± 4.2%	49%	40%	3%	9%
Marist College	July 15–19, 2018	906	± 3.8%	54%	39%	1%	6%
SurveyMonkey/Axios	June 11 – July 2, 2018	968	± 4.5%	55%	42%	–	3%
Marquette University	June 13–17, 2018	800	± 4.0%	50%	39%	–	7%
Public Policy Polling (D)	March 15–16, 2018	910	± 3.3%	51%	38%	–	11%

with generic Republican

Poll source	Date(s) administered	Sample size	Margin of error	Tammy Baldwin (D)	Generic Republican	Undecided
SurveyMonkey/Axios	February 12 – March 5, 2018	1,668	± 3.6%	49%	46%	5%

with David Clarke

Poll source	Date(s) administered	Sample size	Margin of error	Tammy Baldwin (D)	David Clarke (R)	Other	Undecided
Magellan Strategies (R)	February 9–10, 2017	500	± 4.4%	49%	35%	2%	14%

with Sean Duffy

Poll source	Date(s) administered	Sample size	Margin of error	Tammy Baldwin (D)	Sean Duffy (R)	Other	Undecided
Magellan Strategies (R)	February 9–10, 2017	500	± 4.4%	49%	36%	2%	13%

=== Results ===
Despite initial expectations of a potentially close race, Baldwin ended up winning by over 10 percentage points, which was the highest margin of victory for a Wisconsin Democratic statewide candidate in 2018. She ran up the margins in the traditional Democratic strongholds of Milwaukee and Madison, but also won in western Wisconsin, Green Bay and most of the counties bordering Illinois, including Racine, Rock, and Kenosha counties. This was the largest margin of victory for the Democrats in a major Wisconsin statewide campaign (presidential, senate, gubernatorial) since 2008.

United States Senate election in Wisconsin, 2018
Party	Candidate	Votes	%	±%
Democratic	Tammy Baldwin (incumbent)	1,472,914	55.36%	+3.95%
Republican	Leah Vukmir	1,184,885	44.53%	−1.33%
Write-in		2,964	0.11%	N/A
Total votes		2,660,763	100.00%	N/A
Democratic hold				

==== By county ====
County	Tammy Baldwin Democratic		Leah Vukmir Republican		Write-ins		Margin		Total votes cast
County	#	%	#	%	#	%	#	%	Total votes cast
Adams	4,537	48.3%	4,854	51.6%	8	0.1%	-317	-3.3%	9,399
Ashland	4,533	65.8%	2,351	34.1%	8	0.1%	2,182	31.7%	6,892
Barron	8,571	46.3%	9,911	53.6%	11	0.1%	-1,340	-7.3%	18,493
Bayfield	5,541	63.1%	3,233	36.8%	1	0.0%	2,308	26.3%	8,775
Brown	59,132	51.4%	55,750	48.5%	184	0.2%	3,382	2.9%	115,066
Buffalo	2,945	49.8%	2,968	50.2%	4	0.1%	-23	-0.4%	5,917
Burnett	3,239	43.0%	4,289	57.0%	0	0.0%	-1,050	-14.0%	7,528
Calumet	10,741	45.6%	12,822	54.4%	0	0.0%	-2,081	-8.8%	23,563
Chippewa	13,798	49.9%	13,830	50.1%	1	0.0%	-32	-0.2%	27,629
Clark	5,084	43.7%	6,558	56.3%	2	0.0%	-1,474	-12.6%	11,644
Columbia	15,230	56.5%	11,674	43.3%	36	0.1%	3,556	13.2%	26,940
Crawford	3,852	58.8%	2,703	41.2%	0	0.0%	1,149	17.6%	6,555
Dane	228,050	77.6%	65,515	22.3%	414	0.1%	162,535	55.3%	293,979
Dodge	16,007	42.7%	21,482	57.3%	1	0.0%	-5,475	-14.6%	37,490
Door	9,442	55.7%	7,494	44.2%	11	0.1%	1,948	11.5%	16,947
Douglas	11,689	62.8%	6,925	37.2%	8	0.0%	4,764	25.6%	18,622
Dunn	9,743	53.0%	8,623	46.9%	1	0.0%	1,120	6.1%	18,367
Eau Claire	29,614	60.9%	18,957	39.0%	71	0.1%	10,657	21.9%	48,642
Florence	729	33.6%	1,438	66.4%	0	0.0%	-709	-32.8%	2,167
Fond du Lac	19,065	42.7%	25,496	57.2%	41	0.1%	-6,431	-14.5%	44,602
Forest	1,879	47.6%	2,062	52.3%	3	0.1%	-183	-4.7%	3,944
Grant	10,554	54.3%	8,860	45.6%	6	0.0%	1,694	8.7%	19,420
Green	10,294	60.4%	6,732	39.5%	11	0.1%	3,562	20.9%	17,037
Green Lake	3,222	39.7%	4,893	60.3%	2	0.0%	-1,671	-20.6%	8,117
Iowa	7,270	65.4%	3,835	34.5%	9	0.1%	3,435	30.9%	11,114
Iron	1,459	47.6%	1,605	52.4%	0	0.0%	-146	-4.8%	3,064
Jackson	4,370	54.8%	3,611	45.2%	0	0.0%	759	9.6%	7,981
Jefferson	18,055	47.6%	19,809	52.3%	47	0.1%	-1,754	-4.7%	37,911
Juneau	4,658	46.1%	5,429	53.8%	9	0.1%	-771	-7.7%	10,096
Kenosha	38,296	56.7%	29,181	43.2%	112	0.2%	9,115	13.5%	67,589
Kewaunee	4,287	45.3%	5,158	54.6%	9	0.1%	-871	-9.3%	9,454
La Crosse	35,731	62.8%	21,160	37.2%	0	0.0%	14,571	25.6%	56,891
Lafayette	3,592	55.3%	2,900	44.7%	1	0.0%	692	10.6%	6,493
Langlade	3,889	42.6%	5,239	57.4%	0	0.0%	-1,350	-14.8%	9,128
Lincoln	6,463	48.3%	6,901	51.6%	15	0.1%	-438	-3.3%	13,379
Manitowoc	16,541	46.8%	18,795	53.1%	37	0.1%	-2,254	-6.3%	35,373
Marathon	29,084	47.1%	32,661	52.8%	68	0.1%	-3,577	-5.7%	61,813
Marinette	7,520	43.6%	9,731	56.4%	1	0.0%	-2,211	-12.8%	17,252
Marquette	3,337	46.8%	3,791	53.1%	6	0.1%	-454	-6.3%	7,134
Menominee	896	80.3%	220	19.7%	0	0.0%	676	60.6%	1,116
Milwaukee	280,426	71.4%	111,684	28.4%	748	0.2%	168,742	43.0%	392,858
Monroe	8,151	48.7%	8,559	51.2%	21	0.1%	-408	-2.5%	16,731
Oconto	7,042	40.4%	10,392	59.6%	15	0.1%	-408	-19.2%	16,731
Oneida	9,338	48.0%	10,112	51.9%	23	0.1%	-774	-3.9%	19,473
Outagamie	41,618	50.2%	41,354	49.8%	2	0.0%	264	0.4%	82,974
Ozaukee	21,464	42.1%	29,480	57.8%	66	0.1%	-8,016	-15.7%	51,010
Pepin	1,529	49.2%	1,578	50.8%	0	0.0%	-49	1.6%	3,107
Pierce	9,216	52.8%	8,247	47.2%	3	0.0%	969	5.6%	17,466
Polk	8,299	44.8%	10,245	55.2%	0	0.0%	-1,946	-10.4%	18,544
Portage	20,170	58.1%	14,510	41.8%	45	0.1%	5,660	16.3%	34,725
Price	3,136	47.2%	3,515	52.8%	0	0.0%	-379	-5.6%	6,651
Racine	45,397	52.3%	41,213	47.5%	140	0.2%	4,184	4.8%	86,750
Richland	4,000	57.3%	2,980	42.7%	6	0.1%	1,020	14.6%	6,986
Rock	42,616	62.7%	25,322	37.2%	73	0.1%	17,294	25.5%	68,011
Rusk	2,654	43.9%	3,381	55.9%	11	0.2%	-727	-12.0%	6,046
St. Croix	18,765	47.1%	21,069	52.9%	30	0.1%	-2,304	-5.8%	39,864
Sauk	16,960	58.8%	11,866	41.2%	0	0.0%	5,094	17.6%	28,826
Sawyer	3,938	48.6%	4,159	51.3%	3	0.0%	-221	-2.7%	8,100
Shawano	7,414	41.5%	10,438	58.5%	0	0.0%	-3,024	-17.0%	17,852
Sheboygan	24,183	45.7%	28,667	54.2%	75	0.1%	-4,484	-8.5%	52,925
Taylor	3,028	37.7%	5,005	62.3%	2	0.0%	-1,977	-24.6%	8,035
Trempealeau	6,526	53.6%	5,633	46.3%	9	0.1%	893	7.3%	12,168
Vernon	7,495	57.8%	5,459	42.1%	5	0.0%	2,036	15.7%	12,969
Vilas	5,308	42.5%	7,166	57.4%	17	0.1%	-1,858	-14.9%	12,491
Walworth	20,299	44.9%	24,844	54.9%	73	0.2%	-4,545	-10.0%	45,216
Washburn	3,664	46.6%	4,190	53.3%	4	0.1%	-526	-6.7%	7,858
Washington	23,072	32.9%	47,102	67.1%	1	0.0%	-24,030	-34.2%	70,175
Waukesha	84,147	38.1%	136,190	61.7%	293	0.1%	-52,043	-23.6%	220,630
Waupaca	9,509	42.6%	12,792	57.3%	15	0.1%	-3,283	-14.7%	22,316
Waushara	4,434	42.1%	6,106	57.9%	0	0.0%	-1,672	-15.8%	10,540
Winnebago	40,185	53.2%	35,282	46.7%	118	0.2%	4,903	6.5%	75,585
Wood	15,992	48.6%	16,899	51.3%	28	0.1%	-907	-2.7%	32,919
Totals	1,472,914	55.4%	1,184,885	44.5%	2,964	0.1%	288,029	10.9%	2,660,763

Counties that flipped from Democratic to Republican

- Buffalo (largest city: Mondovi)
- Forest (largest city: Crandon)
- Juneau (largest city: Mauston)
- Lincoln (largest city: Merrill)
- Pepin (largest city: Durand)
- Price (largest city: Park Falls)
- Sawyer (largest city: Hayward)
- Chippewa (largest city: Chippewa Falls)
- Wood (largest city: Marshfield)

Counties that flipped from Republican to Democratic

- Outagamie (largest city: Appleton)
- Brown (largest city: Green Bay)

==== By congressional district ====
As a result of partisan gerrymandering, Baldwin only won three out of the state's eight Congressional districts, despite winning the election comfortably by over ten percentage points.

District	Baldwin	Vukmir	Representative
1st	49.6%	50.3%	Bryan Steil
2nd	73%	26%	Mark Pocan
3rd	56%	44%	Ron Kind
4th	79%	21%	Gwen Moore
5th	43%	57%	Jim Sensenbrenner
6th	47%	52%	Glenn Grothman
7th	48%	52%	Sean Duffy
8th	48%	51%	Mike Gallagher

== See also ==
- 2018 United States Senate elections
- 2018 Wisconsin gubernatorial election
- 2018 Wisconsin elections

== Notes ==
Partisan clients
