= Senator Panzer =

Senator Panzer may refer to:

- Frank E. Panzer (1890–1969), Wisconsin State Senate
- Mary Panzer (born 1951), Wisconsin State Senate
