= Hubbard, Wisconsin =

Hubbard is the name of some places in the U.S. state of Wisconsin:

- Hubbard, Dodge County, Wisconsin, a town
- Hubbard, Rusk County, Wisconsin, a town
