= Nate Gustafson =

21st century American politician

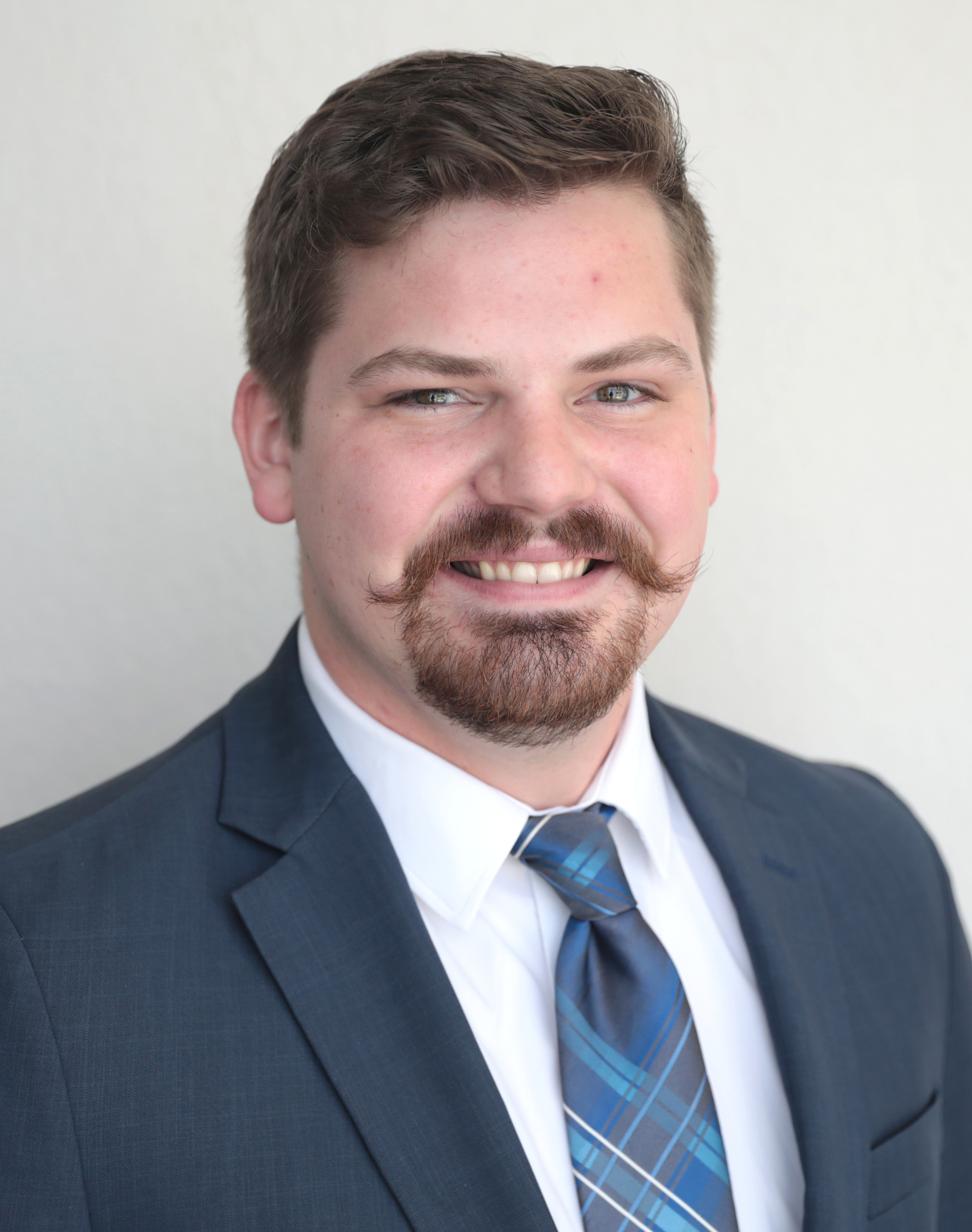

Member of the Wisconsin State Assembly from the 55th district
- Incumbent
- Assumed office January 3, 2023
- Preceded by: Rachael Cabral-Guevara

Member of the Winnebago County, Wisconsin, Board of Supervisors from the 28th district
- Incumbent
- Assumed office April 2022
- Preceded by: Jerry Finch

Personal details
- Born: February 28, 1995 (age 31) Appleton, Wisconsin, U.S.
- Party: Republican
- Education: Fox Valley Technical College (AS); University of Wisconsin–Oshkosh
- Occupation: Systems analyst
- Website: Official website Campaign website
- Nickname: Gus

Nate "Gus" Gustafson (born February 28, 1995) is an American information technology professional and Republican politician from Winnebago County, Wisconsin. He is a member of the Wisconsin State Assembly, representing Wisconsin's 55th Assembly district since January 2023. He is also currently a member of the Winnebago County board of supervisors.

== Biography ==
Nate Gustafson was born in Appleton, Wisconsin, and raised in the village of Fox Crossing, Wisconsin (formerly the town of Menasha). He attended public schools in the Neenah Joint School District, and went on to attend University of Wisconsin–Oshkosh, Fox Cities Campus. He ultimately received his associate's degree in cybersecurity from the Fox Valley Technical College in 2018.

He has worked for a number of companies in northern Winnebago County, and is now working health and human services analyst for Outagamie County.

== Political career ==
Gustafson's first job in politics was serving as campaign manager for Rachael Cabral-Guevara during her first run for Wisconsin State Assembly in 2020. After her successful election, he worked for Elijah Behnke in his 2021 special election. Following that campaign, he created Winnebago County for Freedom, a volunteer organization in his community to boost conservative candidates.

In the Spring 2022 election, he was elected to the Winnebago County board of supervisors.

In March 2022, Cabral-Guevara announced she would run for Wisconsin State Senate that year, rather than seeking another term in the Assembly. That same day, Gustafson launched his campaign to succeed Cabral-Guevara in the 55th Assembly district. Gustafson faced no challengers in the Republican primary, and went on to defeat Democrat Stefanie A. Holt in the general election, receiving 54% of the vote.

He assumed office in January 2023.

In October 2023, Gustafson attend a rally for the anti-LGBT organization, Gays Against Groomers, which had about a dozen attendees and garnered attention for its hateful signage which falsely accused trans people and LGBT activists of "coordinated child abuse". Two other Republican Wisconsin state legislators, Reps. Joy Goeben and John Macco also attended the rally.

On April 11, 2024, former GOP presidential candidate Vivek Ramaswamy announced that he was endorsing Gustafson after signing Ramaswamy's American Truth Pledge, for Gustafson's reelection campaign for the 55th Assembly district seat.

== Electoral history ==
=== Wisconsin Assembly (2022, 2024) ===
Year	Election	Date	Elected				Defeated				Total	Plurality
2022	General	Nov. 8	Nate Gustafson	Republican	15,098	54.53%	Stefanie A. Holt	Dem.	12,571	45.41%	27,686	2,527
2024	Primary	Aug. 13	Nate Gustafson (inc)	Republican	4,643	55.01%	Michael Schraa	Rep.	3,787	44.86%	8,441	856
2024	General	Nov. 5	Nate Gustafson (inc)	Republican	22,609	60.37%	Kyle Kehoe	Dem.	14,803	39.53%	37,452	7,806

Wisconsin State Assembly
Preceded by Rachael Cabral-Guevara	Member of the Wisconsin State Assembly from the 55th district January 3, 2023 – present	Incumbent
