= Grebe (disambiguation) =

A grebe is an aquatic diving bird.

Grebe may also refer to:

== Geographical features ==
- Grebe Lake in Yellowstone park
- Grebe River in New Zealand

== Military ==
- USS Grebe (AM-43), a minesweeper of the US Navy
- HMS Grebe, an air base of Britain's Royal Navy in Alexandria, Egypt
- SUM-N-2 Grebe, a torpedo launcher of the US Navy
- Gloster Grebe, a fighter of Britain's Royal Air force in the 1920s-1930s

== People ==
- Camilla Grebe (born 1968), Swedish novelist
- Alfred H. Grebe (1895-1935), American radio broadcaster
- Stephanie Grebe (born 1987), German table tennis player
- William Grebe (1869–1960), American fencer
- Wilhelm Grebe, architect for Hitler
- Konrad Grebe (1907–1972), German mining engineer
- Michael W. Grebe, American lawyer, philanthropist and conservative activist
