= Dean Kaufert =

American politician (born 1957)

Member of the Wisconsin State Assembly
- Incumbent
- Assumed office January 6, 2025
- Preceded by: Michael Schraa
- Succeeded by: Becky Nichols (elect)
- Constituency: 53rd Assembly district
- In office January 7, 1991 – January 5, 2015
- Preceded by: Esther K. Walling
- Succeeded by: Mike Rohrkaste
- Constituency: 55th Assembly district

Mayor of Neenah, Wisconsin
- In office April 2014 – April 2022
- Preceded by: George Scherck
- Succeeded by: Jane B. Lang

Personal details
- Born: May 23, 1957 (age 69) Menasha, Wisconsin, U.S.
- Party: Republican
- Education: University of Wisconsin–Stevens Point
- Occupation: Politician, small business owner
- Website: Campaign website

Dean R. Kaufert (born May 23, 1957) is an American business owner and Republican politician from Neenah, Wisconsin. He is a member of the Wisconsin State Assembly, representing Wisconsin's 53rd Assembly district since 2025. He previously represented the 55th Assembly district from 1991 to 2015, and served as mayor of Neenah from 2014 to 2022.

== Early life ==
Dean Kaufert was born in Menasha, Wisconsin, on May 23, 1957. He was raised and educated in Menasha and neighboring Neenah, Wisconsin, graduating from Neenah's Armstrong High School in 1975. After graduation, Kaufert was employed at Jay's Foods, a grocer.

In these years, Kaufert was active in local recreational bowling, basketball, and baseball leagues. Through these interests, in 1983, Kaufert and a friend decided to start a small business dealing in trophies, plaques, and other similar awards, known as All-Sport Trophy & Engraving.

== Political career ==
In 1986, Kaufert won his first public office when he was elected to the Neenah City Council. He defeated incumbent city councilmember Lester Herzfeld, 343–245, in what was considered a local upset. Kaufert credited his win to an aggressive door-to-door canvassing effort. Kaufert won a rematch two years later for another two-year term, and was re-elected without opposition in 1990.

A few weeks after his 1990 city council re-election, Kaufert announced he intended to seek the Republican Party nomination for Wisconsin State Assembly in the 55th Assembly district. His run effectively set up a primary challenge against incumbent Esther K. Walling, but a month later, Walling announced she would not run again. Her withdrawal invited a wave of additional candidates to jump into the race, and Kaufert ultimately faced three opponents in the Republican primary, but prevailed with 48% of the vote. In the general election, Kaufert defeated Democrat Stanley P. Sevenich with 59% of the vote. Kaufert resigned from the city council shortly after winning election to the Assembly.

He won re-election twice, in 1992 and 1994, by wide margins, then faced no opponent for the next five elections.

In the 1997 legislative term, Kaufert was appointed to a coveted seat on the Legislature's Joint Finance Committee, responsible for Wisconsin's budget and appropriations process.

In 1998, Kaufert sponsored a bill legalizing chemical castration of sex offenders as a condition of parole. The bill passed and as of 2026 remains on the books of the Wisconsin Statutes. A 2021 report by the Wisconsin Legislative Council (non-partisan research staff of the Wisconsin State Legislature) found no records of chemical castration's use in the state.

In 2006, Kaufert faced a serious challenge in the general election from Democrat Mark Westphal, the president of the Fox Valley Area Labor Council for the previous 10 years. Westphal campaigned against the Republican majority in the Legislature, which he cast as overly partisan and focused on special interests. Boosted by a national Democratic wave, Westphal gave Kaufert his closest race yet; Kaufert prevailed by 811 votes. Westphal ran again in 2008, but Kaufert won again by the slightly larger margin of 2,080 votes.

The 2010 election ushered in full Republican control of Wisconsin state government, and resulted in Republicans passing one of the most dramatic gerrymanders in United States history. Kaufert's district saw its most significant reconfiguration since 1954. Neenah's twin city, Menasha, was removed from the district and replaced with parts of rural neighboring townships in Winnebago and Outagamie counties.

In 2014 Kaufert was elected mayor of Neenah, Wisconsin. The night of his mayoral election, Kaufert announced he would not run for re-election to the Assembly, but remained in both offices until the end of the 2013–2014 term.

Kaufert was re-elected without opposition to another four-year term as mayor in 2018, but announced in 2021 that he would not run for a third term.

In May 2024, Kaufert announced his intention to run again for Wisconsin State Assembly in the new 53rd Assembly district. The 2024 redistricting had returned Kaufert's hometown, Neenah, to the same district as twin city Menasha, assembling the new 53rd Assembly district in a configuration similar to Kaufert's old 55th Assembly district prior to the 2011 redistricting. In the general election, Kaufert faced fellow Neenah resident Duane Shukoski, a labor union leader at the local Kimberly-Clark plant. The district was projected to be highly competitive, and the result proved to be one of the closest legislative races in the state. Kaufert prevailed by just 364 votes.

On April 27, 2026, Kaufert announced that he was not seeking reelection to the State Assembly.

== Personal life and family ==
Dean Kaufert is one of four children born to Kenneth Kaufert and Ruth (née Raddatz) Kaufert. Dean's parents divorced, and both subsequently remarried. His mother died of a long illness at the relatively young age of 37, in 1976.

Dean Kaufert married Renee Strunk on July 22, 1978. They have two adult children and still reside in Neenah.

== Electoral history ==
=== Wisconsin Assembly, 55th district (1990–2012) ===
Year	Election	Date	Elected				Defeated				Total	Plurality
1990	Primary	Sep. 11	Dean R. Kaufert	Republican	1,821	48.91%	Kenneth A. Harwood	Rep.	1,180	31.69%	3,723	641
1990	Primary	Sep. 11	Dean R. Kaufert	Republican	1,821	48.91%	Owen W. Williams	Rep.	521	13.99%	3,723	641
1990	Primary	Sep. 11	Dean R. Kaufert	Republican	1,821	48.91%	John W. Collins	Rep.	201	5.40%	3,723	641
1990	General	Nov. 6	Dean R. Kaufert	Republican	8,221	59.01%	Stanley P. Sevenich	Dem.	5,710	40.99%	13,931	2,511
1992	General	Nov. 3	Dean R. Kaufert (inc)	Republican	14,435	62.93%	David M. Kollath	Dem.	8,502	37.07%	22,937	5,933
1994	General	Nov. 8	Dean R. Kaufert (inc)	Republican	9,955	69.01%	Jason J. Hanson	Dem.	4,471	30.99%	14,426	5,484
1996	General	Nov. 5	Dean R. Kaufert (inc)	Republican	16,065	100.0%	--unopposed--				16,065	
1998	General	Nov. 3	Dean R. Kaufert (inc)	Republican	12,296	100.0%	--unopposed--				12,296	
2000	General	Nov. 7	Dean R. Kaufert (inc)	Republican	17,556	98.42%	--unopposed--				17,837	
2002	General	Nov. 5	Dean R. Kaufert (inc)	Republican	12,312	98.74%	--unopposed--				12,469	
2004	General	Nov. 2	Dean R. Kaufert (inc)	Republican	19,662	98.30%	--unopposed--				20,003	
2006	General	Nov. 7	Dean R. Kaufert (inc)	Republican	10,396	51.99%	Mark Westphal	Dem.	9,585	47.93%	19,997	811
2008	General	Nov. 4	Dean R. Kaufert (inc)	Republican	14,259	53.88%	Mark Westphal	Dem.	12,179	46.02%	26,466	2,080
2010	General	Nov. 2	Dean R. Kaufert (inc)	Republican	13,569	98.79%	--unopposed--				13,735	
2012	Primary	Aug. 14	Dean R. Kaufert (inc)	Republican	4,612	64.94%	Jay Schroeder	Rep.	2,487	35.02%	7,102	2,125
2012	General	Nov. 6	Dean R. Kaufert (inc)	Republican	19,142	62.95%	Mark Westphal	Dem.	10,202	33.55%	30,408	8,940
2012	General	Nov. 6	Dean R. Kaufert (inc)	Republican	19,142	62.95%	Rich Martin	Ind.	1,016	3.34%	30,408	8,940

=== Neenah mayor (2014, 2018) ===
Year	Election	Date	Elected				Defeated				Total	Plurality
2014	General	Apr. 1	Dean R. Kaufert	Nonpartisan	2,623	57.65%	George Scherck (inc)	Non.	1,927	42.35%	4,550	696
2018	General	Apr. 3	Dean R. Kaufert (inc)	Nonpartisan			--unopposed--					

=== Wisconsin Assembly, 53rd district (2024) ===
Year	Election	Date	Elected				Defeated				Total	Plurality
2024	General	Nov. 5	Dean R. Kaufert	Republican	15,801	50.51%	Duane J. Shukoski	Dem.	15,437	49.35%	31,280	364

Wisconsin State Assembly
Preceded by Esther K. Walling	Member of the Wisconsin State Assembly from the 55th district January 7, 1991 – January 5, 2015	Succeeded by Mike Rohrkaste
Preceded by Michael Schraa	Member of the Wisconsin State Assembly from the 53rd district January 6, 2025 – present	Incumbent
Political offices
Preceded by George Scherck	Mayor of Neenah, Wisconsin; April 2014 – April 2022	Succeeded by Jane B. Lang
