= James R. Lewis (legislator) =

American legislator (1936–2020)

James R. Lewis (May 3, 1936 – October 9, 2020) was an American evangelist, businessman and former Republican member of the Wisconsin State Assembly, who was removed from office after being convicted of perjury.

== Background ==
Lewis was born in Milwaukee, Wisconsin. He attended Rufus King High School, University of Wisconsin–Milwaukee, and Moody Bible Institute; worked as an evangelist for the Billy Graham Evangelistic Association; married; and became active in the organizations Citizens for Decency Through Law and Christian Business Men's Committee (of which he was a regional director). As of 1972–1974 he lived in the Town of Barton in Washington County. An ordained minister, Lewis founded Christian Bible Fellowship, a regional missionary society, in 1988.

== Legislative service ==
He was elected to represent the newly created 53rd Assembly District (portions of Dodge, Fond du Lac, and Washington counties) in 1972 with 9341 votes, to 7939 for Democrat Lehman Eichstadt. In 1974 he almost lost a challenge in the Republican primary to Mary Panzer (daughter of Frank E. Panzer, a former state senator from this area), receiving 1830 votes to her 1749; but won the general election by a more comfortable margin. He saw no challenge in the 1976 primary and was reelected easily. In 1978 he was re-elected without opposition.

== Conviction and removal from office ==
Lewis became part of a group who attempted to persuade laser scientist Myron Muckerheide (formerly with NASA) to create a laser gun "designed to blind people", and to sell it to Guatemalan colonel Federico Fuentes in order to raise funds to build a laetrile factory in South America (Lewis had been a prominent Wisconsin advocate for the legalization and manufacture of laetrile). Muckerheide contacted the FBI, the laser was never built, and in 1979 Lewis pleaded guilty to perjury for lying to a federal grand jury investigating the scheme. Lewis, apologized, saying he "...made a very, very serious mistake and I regret that very much." Fellow Republican Governor Lee Dreyfus declined to request a presidential pardon for Lewis, although he was quoted as saying the six-month sentence was too harsh.

Under the relevant provisions of Wisconsin law, Lewis was removed from office. In the subsequent special election, Mary Panzer was elected to take his place.

== After removal ==
Lewis worked for a family owned business, Sunseed Natural Foods, in West Bend. He served on the board of the Mid-American Health Organization (a regional lobbying organization for health food stores and sellers of dietary supplements) and as its president (2002-2010).

Lewis died on October 9, 2020, in Wisconsin Dells.

Wisconsin State Assembly
Preceded by District Created	Member of the Wisconsin State Assembly from the 53rd district January 1, 1973–November 21, 1979	Succeeded by Mary Panzer
