= Wisconsin's 55th Assembly district =

American legislative district in east-central Wisconsin

Wisconsin's 55th State Assembly district
- 2024 map defined in 2023 Wisc. Act 94; 2022 map defined in Johnson v. Wisconsin Elections Commission; 2011 map was defined in 2011 Wisc. Act 43
Assemblymember
Nate Gustafson; R–Fox Crossing
since January 3, 2023 (3 years)
- Demographics: 91.19% White; 1.23% Black; 2.71% Hispanic; 2.83% Asian; 1.5% Native American; 0.08% Hawaiian/Pacific Islander
- Population (2020) • Voting age: 60,099; 47,374
- Website: Official website
- Notes: East-central Wisconsin

The 55th Assembly district of the Wisconsin is one of 99 districts in the Wisconsin State Assembly. Located in east-central Wisconsin, the district comprises most of Winnebago County and part of southern Outagamie County. It includes all of the city of Omro and the village of Winneconne, the portion of Fox Crossing west of the Fox River, and the southern quarter of the city of Oshkosh. The district is represented by Republican Nate Gustafson, since January 2023.

The 55th Assembly district is located within Wisconsin's 19th Senate district, along with the 56th and 57th Assembly districts.

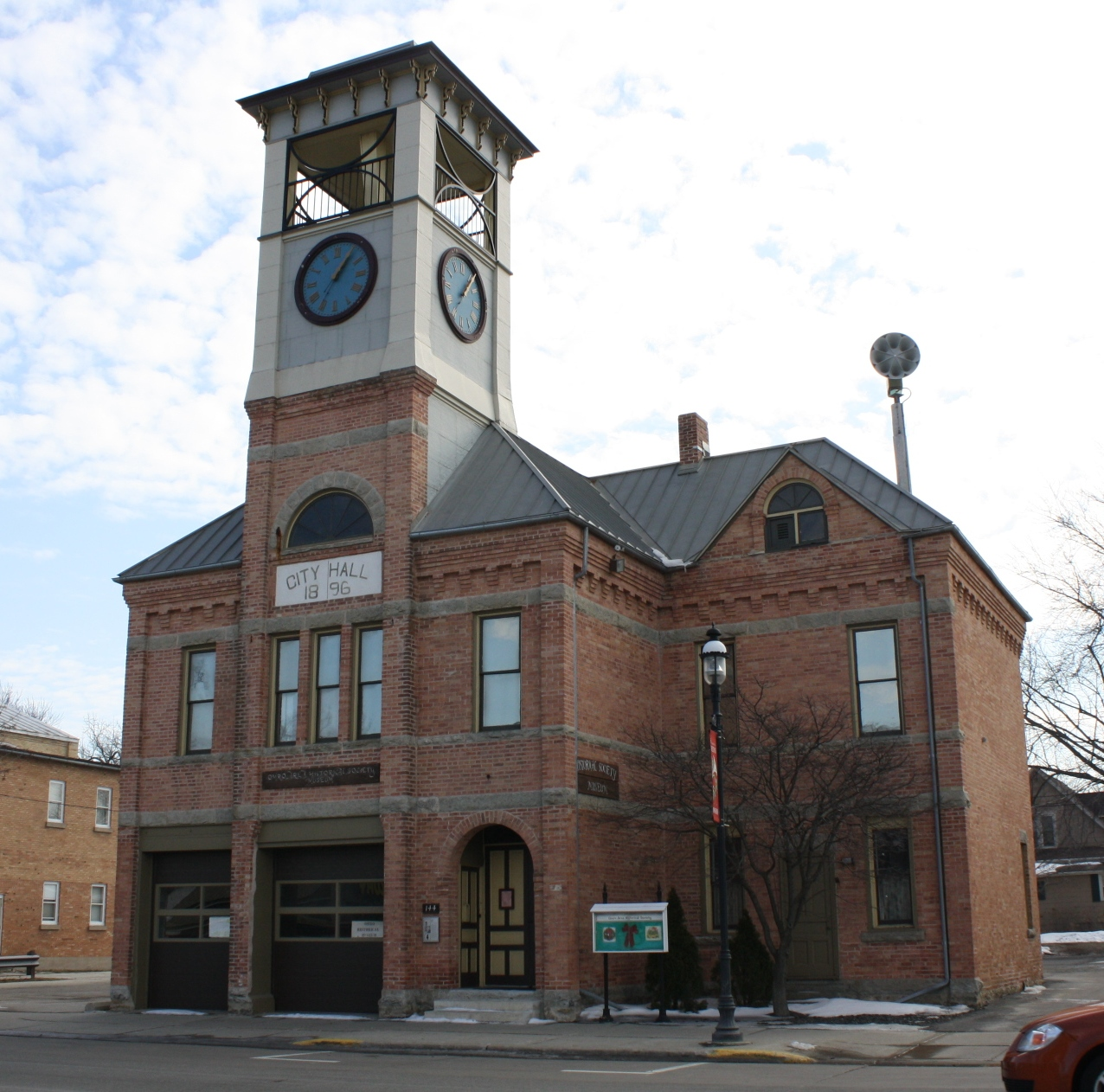
Omro Village Hall and Engine House in Omro

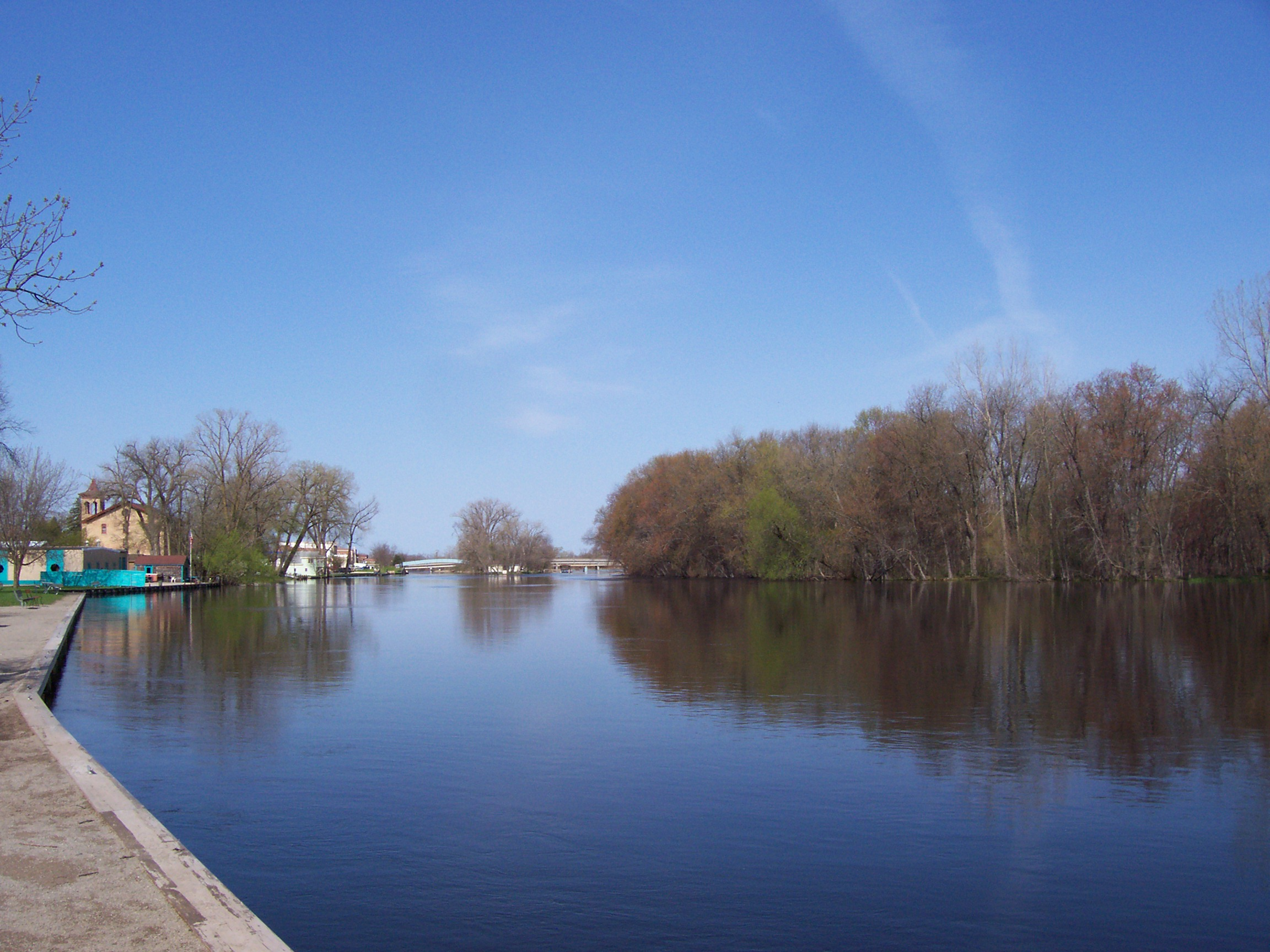
Fox River viewed from Omro

== List of past representatives ==
List of representatives to the Wisconsin State Assembly from the 55th district
Member	Party	Residence	Counties represented	Term start	Term end	Ref.
District created
Michael G. Ellis	Rep.	Neenah	Winnebago	January 1, 1973	January 3, 1983	
Steven C. Brist	Dem.	Chippewa Falls	Barron, Chippewa, Dunn	January 3, 1983	January 7, 1985	
Esther K. Walling	Rep.	Neenah	Winnebago	January 7, 1985	January 7, 1991	
Dean Kaufert	Rep.	Neenah	Winnebago	January 7, 1991	January 5, 2015	
Mike Rohrkaste	Rep.	Neenah	Outagamie, Winnebago	January 5, 2015	January 4, 2021	
Rachael Cabral-Guevara	Rep.	Fox Crossing	Outagamie, Winnebago	January 4, 2021	January 2, 2023	
Nate Gustafson	Rep.	Neenah	Outagamie, Winnebago	January 3, 2023	Current	
