= Eugene A. Clifford =

American politician (1886–1941)

Eugene Clifford

Member of the Wisconsin Senate from the 13th district
- In office 1931–1934
- Preceded by: William H. Markham
- Succeeded by: Frank E. Panzer

Personal details
- Born: December 5, 1886 Clyman, Wisconsin, US
- Died: 1941 (aged 54–55)
- Party: Democratic
- Education: University of Wisconsin (LLB)

Eugene A. Clifford (December 5, 1886 – 1941) was an American attorney and politician from Juneau, Wisconsin who served one term as a Democratic member of the Wisconsin State Senate from the 13th District.

== Early life and education ==
Clifford was born December 5, 1886, in the town of Clyman, in Dodge County, Wisconsin. He attended Dodgeland High School and the University of Wisconsin Law School.

== Career ==
He spent fifteen years as city attorney of Juneau, as well as four years as mayor. He was a county supervisor for four years, and as of 1931 had been a member of the local board of education for fifteen years. In 1930 he was elected to the State Senate, with 9899 votes to 8193 for Republican incumbent William H. Markham and 201 for Socialist Emil Frienwald. During his first term in office, he was the only Democrat in the Senate. In 1933, he was assigned to the standing committee on the judiciary, and was assigned to joint special committees on farm machinery prices, and on reducing the cost of government (chairing the latter).

He did not run for re-election in 1934, choosing instead to run for Congress from Wisconsin's 8th congressional district (Democratic incumbent James F. Hughes had chosen not to seek re-election). He was unopposed in his primary, but lost the four-way general election to Progressive former Congressman George J. Schneider, with 34,397 votes for Clifford, 39,505 for Schneider, 15,748 for a Republican named Waite, and 523 for an independent candidate. He was succeeded in the State Senate by Frank E. Panzer.
