= Frank E. Panzer =

20th century American politician

President pro tempore of the Wisconsin Senate
- In office January 6, 1947 – January 2, 1967
- Preceded by: Conrad Shearer
- Succeeded by: Robert P. Knowles

Member of the Wisconsin Senate from the 13th district
- In office January 4, 1943 – August 26, 1969
- Preceded by: Jesse Peters
- Succeeded by: Dale McKenna
- In office January 7, 1935 – January 2, 1939
- Preceded by: Eugene A. Clifford
- Succeeded by: Jesse Peters

Member of the Wisconsin State Assembly from the Dodge 1st district
- In office January 5, 1931 – January 2, 1933
- Preceded by: John M. Dihring
- Succeeded by: Lorenz Becker

Personal details
- Born: September 1, 1890 Hubbard, Dodge County, Wisconsin, U.S.
- Died: August 26, 1969 (aged 78) Beaver Dam, Wisconsin, U.S.
- Resting place: Graceland Cemetery, Mayville, Wisconsin
- Party: Republican; Progressive (1934–1946)
- Spouse: Verna L. Lenz (m. 1942–1969)
- Children: Ruth A. (Cotsakis)^{(b. 1915; died 1984)}; Gordon E. Panzer^{(b. 1916; died 1962)}; Mary E. Panzer^{(b. 1951)}

Frank Edward Panzer (September 1, 1890 – August 26, 1969) was an American farmer, teacher, and Progressive Republican politician. He served 30 years in the Wisconsin State Senate, representing Dodge County, and was president pro tempore from 1947 through 1966.

== Background ==
Panzer was born in the Town of Hubbard in Dodge County on September 1, 1890. He attended Oakfield High School, worked as a farmer, banker, schoolteacher, and telegraph operator. He was elected clerk of his school district in 1920–30, and as town chairman in 1925 (serving until 1966), and as chairman of the Dodge County Board from 1940 to 1966.

== State legislative experience ==
He was first elected to the Assembly in 1930 as a Progressive Republican with 4,129 votes to 1,582 for Democrat Jacob Scharpf and 68 for Socialist Ada Burow. He ran for re-election in 1932, but lost his seat to Democrat Lorenz Becker.

In 1934 (after the split between the Republicans and the Wisconsin Progressive Party), Panzer was narrowly elected as a Progressive state senator from the 13th district (Dodge and Jefferson counties), with 10,545 votes to 10,089 for Democrat Paul Hemmy; 5,313 for regular Republican Jesse Peters and 528 for Socialist Alfred Nabor. (Democratic incumbent Eugene A. Clifford was running for Congress.) Panzer was defeated by Peters in 1938. He left the Progressive Party, defeated Peters in the 1942 Republican primary election and won the 1942 general election, as well as all subsequent elections through 1966. He was elected President pro tempore of the Senate from 1947 to 1965. He served as Chairman of the Senate Agriculture Committee, as a member on all major committees of the Senate. He died in office in 1969 and was succeeded by Democrat Dale McKenna.

Panzer's daughter Mary E. Panzer eventually became a Republican member of the Assembly and the Senate herself.

Wisconsin State Assembly
Preceded by John M. Dihring	Member of the Wisconsin State Assembly from the Dodge 1st district January 5, 1931 – January 2, 1933	Succeeded by Lorenz Becker
Wisconsin Senate
Preceded by Eugene A. Clifford	Member of the Wisconsin Senate from the 13th district January 7, 1935 – January 2, 1939	Succeeded by Jesse Peters
Preceded by Jesse Peters	Member of the Wisconsin Senate from the 13th district January 4, 1943 – August 26, 1969	Succeeded by Dale McKenna
Preceded by Conrad Shearer	President pro tempore of the Wisconsin Senate; January 6, 1947 – January 2, 1967	Succeeded by Robert P. Knowles
