= Rachael Cabral-Guevara =

21st century American politician

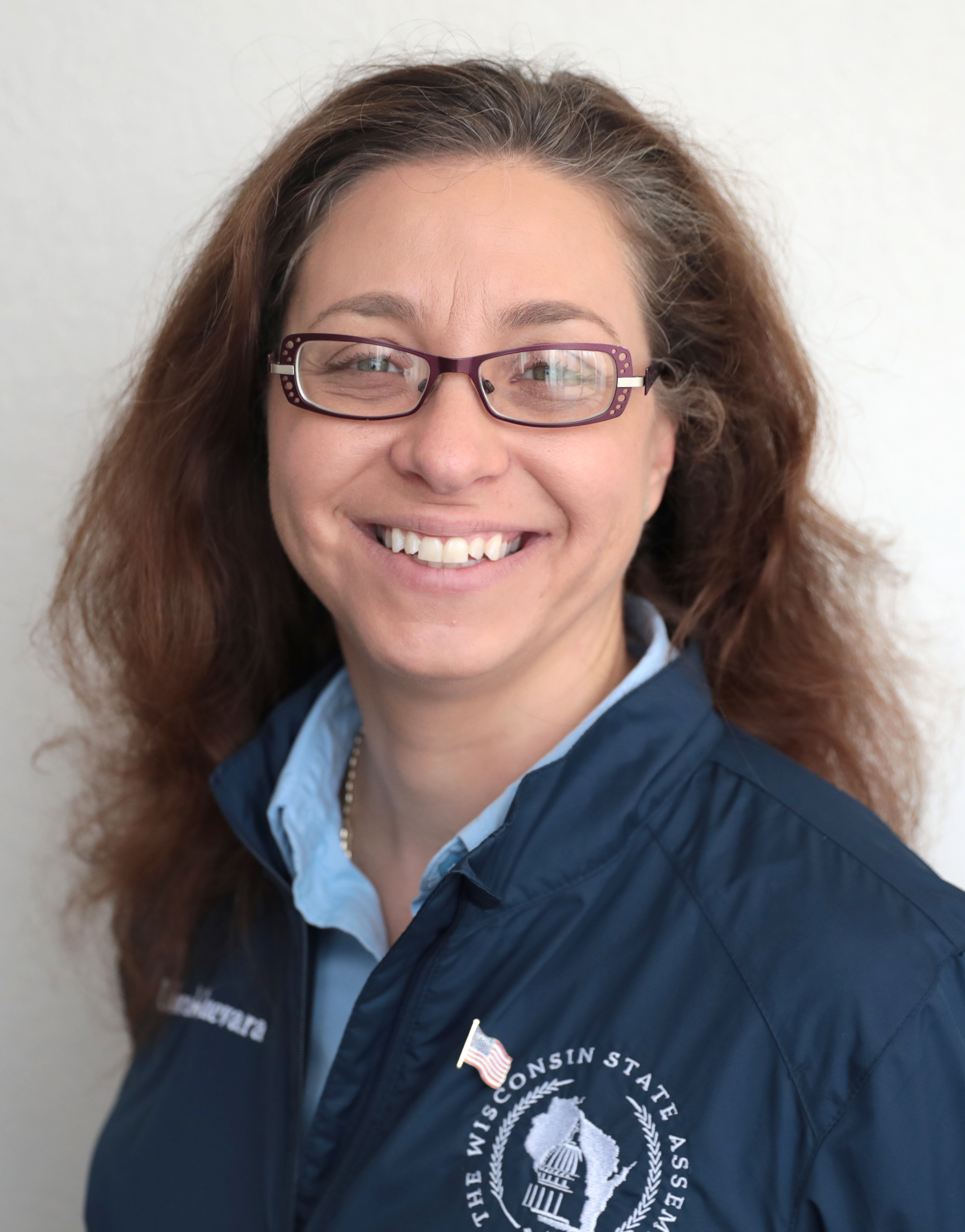

Member of the Wisconsin Senate from the 19th district
- Incumbent
- Assumed office January 3, 2023
- Preceded by: Roger Roth

Member of the Wisconsin State Assembly from the 55th district
- In office January 4, 2021 – January 2, 2023
- Preceded by: Mike Rohrkaste
- Succeeded by: Nate Gustafson

Personal details
- Born: August 10, 1976 (age 50) Appleton, Wisconsin, U.S.
- Party: Republican
- Spouse: divorced
- Children: 4
- Education: Mount Mary University (BS); University of Wisconsin–Oshkosh (BS); University of Wisconsin–Milwaukee (MS)
- Profession: nurse practitioner, educator, politician
- Website: rachaelforsenate.com

Rachael Cabral-Guevara (born August 10, 1976) is an American nurse practitioner, educator, and Republican politician from Appleton, Wisconsin. She is a member of the Wisconsin Senate, representing the 19th Senate district since January 2023. She previously served in the Wisconsin State Assembly, representing the 55th Assembly district during the 2021–2022 session.

== Early life and career ==
Cabral-Guevara was born in Appleton, Wisconsin, but moved frequently as a child of a member of the United States Air Force. She returned to Wisconsin to attend college, first receiving her bachelor's degree in biology from Milwaukee's Mount Mary University, then receiving another bachelor's degree in nursing from the University of Wisconsin–Oshkosh. She continued her education at the University of Wisconsin–Milwaukee, where she earned her master's degree in nursing in 2008. Cabral-Guevara became a board certified family nurse practitioner and licensed advanced practice nurse prescriber, and worked at various health care facilities around Appleton. From 2008 to 2019, she also served as a lecturer in the College of Nursing at University of Wisconsin–Oshkosh.

In 2014, she opened Nurse Practitioner Health Services LLC, a cash-based health clinic targeted to those without insurance or those with high deductibles looking for lower cost alternatives. They opened a second location in Howard, Wisconsin, outside Green Bay, in 2016.

== Political career ==
In October 2019, three-term incumbent state representative Mike Rohrkaste announced he would retire at the end of the current term. Cabral-Guevara had already expressed interest in running for the Wisconsin State Assembly and, on the announcement of Rohrkaste's retirement, immediately confirmed that she would enter the race for the 55th assembly district seat. She made an official announcement of her campaign for the Republican nomination in the district the following February. Cabral-Guevara faced two opponents in the Republican primary—Neenah School Board member Lauri Asbury and perennial candidate and conservative activist Jay Schroeder. The primary grew contentious, with Asbury making an issue of Cabral-Guevara receiving roughly $35,000 worth of campaign support from Virginia-based electioneering PAC Make Liberty Win, and Schroeder attacking Cabral-Guevara over her willingness to explore legalization of recreational marijuana. Cabral-Guevara responded that Democrats and supporters of her opponents were engaged in a campaign of hate mail and vandalism against her, including death threats and racism. In the August primary, Cabral-Guevara won a substantial victory, taking nearly 60% of the vote.

In the November general election, she faced Democrat Dan Schierl, who had previously run against Rohrkaste in 2018. For the general election, Cabral-Guevara pushed a campaign agenda of affordable health care, lower taxes, and improved educational outcomes in the state. With the campaign taking place during the COVID-19 pandemic, Cabral-Guevara also declared her opposition to any business restrictions or limitations to prevent the spread of the virus. Cabral-Guevara prevailed in the general election, carrying nearly 55% of the vote.

On March 17, 2022, Cabral-Guevara announced that she would be running for the 19th State Senate District. The incumbent, Roger Roth, vacated the seat to run for lieutenant governor. She prevailed over Appleton Alderperson Kristin Alfheim in the November 8, 2022 election.

After governor Tony Evers vetoed a bill that would have expanded nurse practitioner's scope of practice, Cabral-Guevara became the focus of widespread bipartisan condemnation after suggesting those who supported the veto should be subjected to medical assault.

== Personal life and family ==
Rachael Cabral-Guevara has four children and resides on Stroebe Island in the village of Fox Crossing, Wisconsin.

She is a member of the Wisconsin Nursing Association, the American Nursing Association, the American Nurses Credentialing Center, and the Sigma Theta Tau nursing honor society.

== Electoral history ==
=== Wisconsin Assembly (2020) ===
Year	Election	Date	Elected				Defeated				Total	Plurality
2020	Primary	Aug. 11	Rachael Cabral-Guevara	Republican	3,481	58.46%	Lauri Asbury	Rep.	1,401	23.53%	5,955	2,080
2020	Primary	Aug. 11	Rachael Cabral-Guevara	Republican	3,481	58.46%	Jay Scroeder	Rep.	1,069	17.95%	5,955	2,080
2020	General	Nov. 3	Rachael Cabral-Guevara	Republican	19,056	54.84%	Daniel Schierl	Dem.	15,658	45.06%	34,749	3,398

=== Wisconsin Senate (2022, 2026) ===
Year	Election	Date	Elected				Defeated				Total	Plurality
2022	Primary	Aug. 9	Rachael Cabral-Guevara	Republican	11,905	63.57%	Andrew K. Thomsen	Rep.	6,806	36.34%	18,727	5,099
2022	General	Nov. 8	Rachael Cabral-Guevara	Republican	42,858	54.02%	Kristin Alfheim	Dem.	36,447	45.94%	79,338	6,411

Wisconsin State Assembly
Preceded by Mike Rohrkaste	Member of the Wisconsin State Assembly from the 55th district January 4, 2021 – January 2, 2023	Succeeded by Nate Gustafson
Wisconsin Senate
Preceded by Roger Roth	Member of the Wisconsin Senate from the 19th district January 3, 2023 – present	Incumbent
