= Wisconsin's 53rd Assembly district =

American legislative district in eastern Wisconsin

Wisconsin's 53rd State Assembly district
- 2024 map defined in 2023 Wisc. Act 94; 2022 map defined in Johnson v. Wisconsin Elections Commission; 2011 map was defined in 2011 Wisc. Act 43
Assemblymember
Dean Kaufert; R–Neenah
since January 6, 2025 (1 year, 52 days)
- Demographics: 86.02% White; 2.44% Black; 5.78% Hispanic; 3.2% Asian; 2.11% Native American; 0.11% Hawaiian/Pacific Islander
- Population (2020) • Voting age: 59,326; 45,714
- Website: Official website
- Notes: East-central Wisconsin

The 53rd Assembly district of Wisconsin is one of 99 districts in the Wisconsin State Assembly. Located in eastern Wisconsin, the district comprises pars of northeast Winnebago County and southern Outagamie County. It includes the city of Neenah, the portion of the city of Menasha in Winnebago County, and the portion of the village of Fox Crossing east of the Fox River, along with part of southern Appleton. The district contains the University of Wisconsin–Oshkosh, Fox Cities Campus and the Kimberly Point Lighthouse. The district is represented by Republican Dean Kaufert, since January 2025; Kaufert previously represented the 55th district from 1991 to 2015.

The 53rd Assembly district is located within Wisconsin's 18th Senate district, along with the 52nd and 54th Assembly districts.

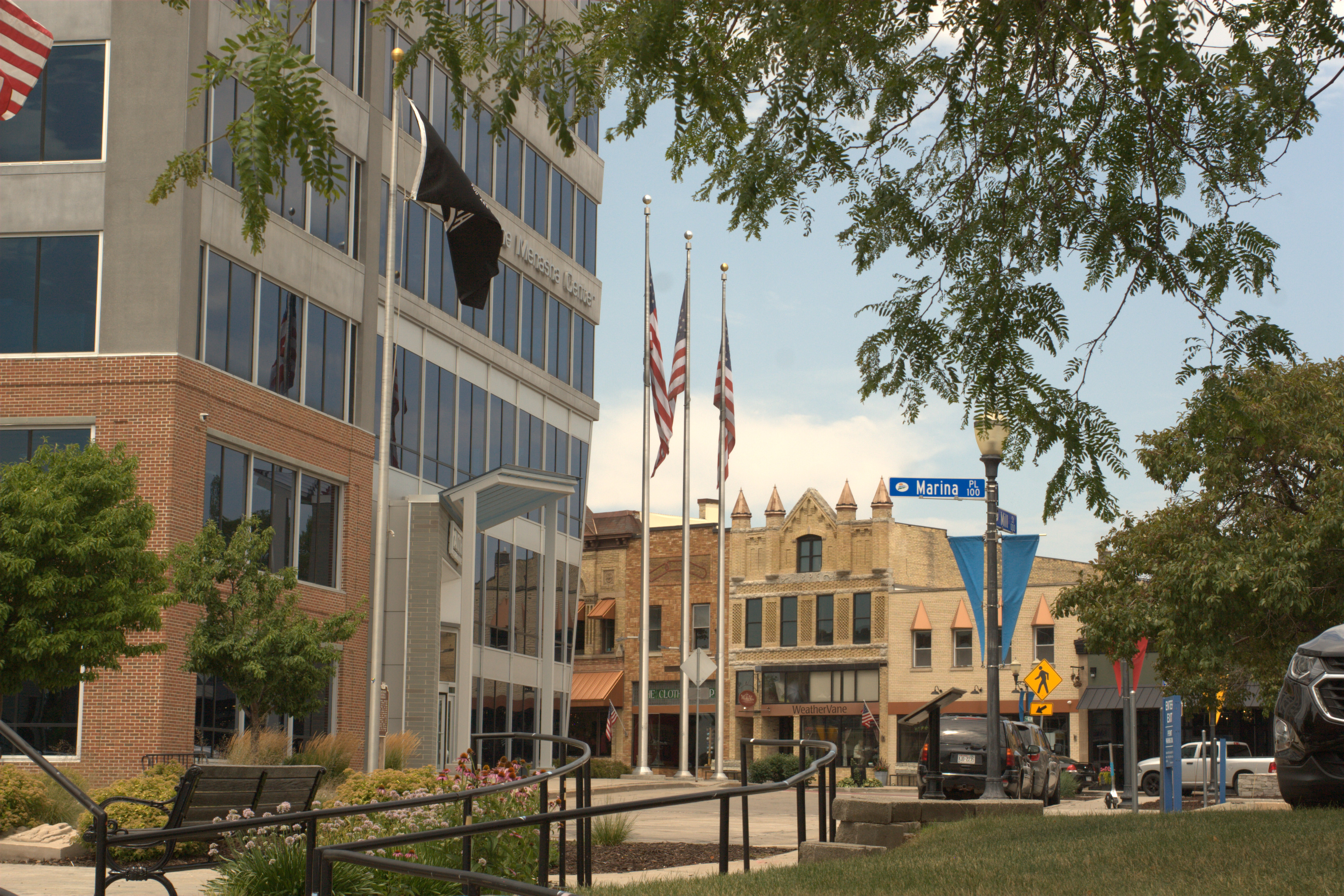
Downtown Menasha

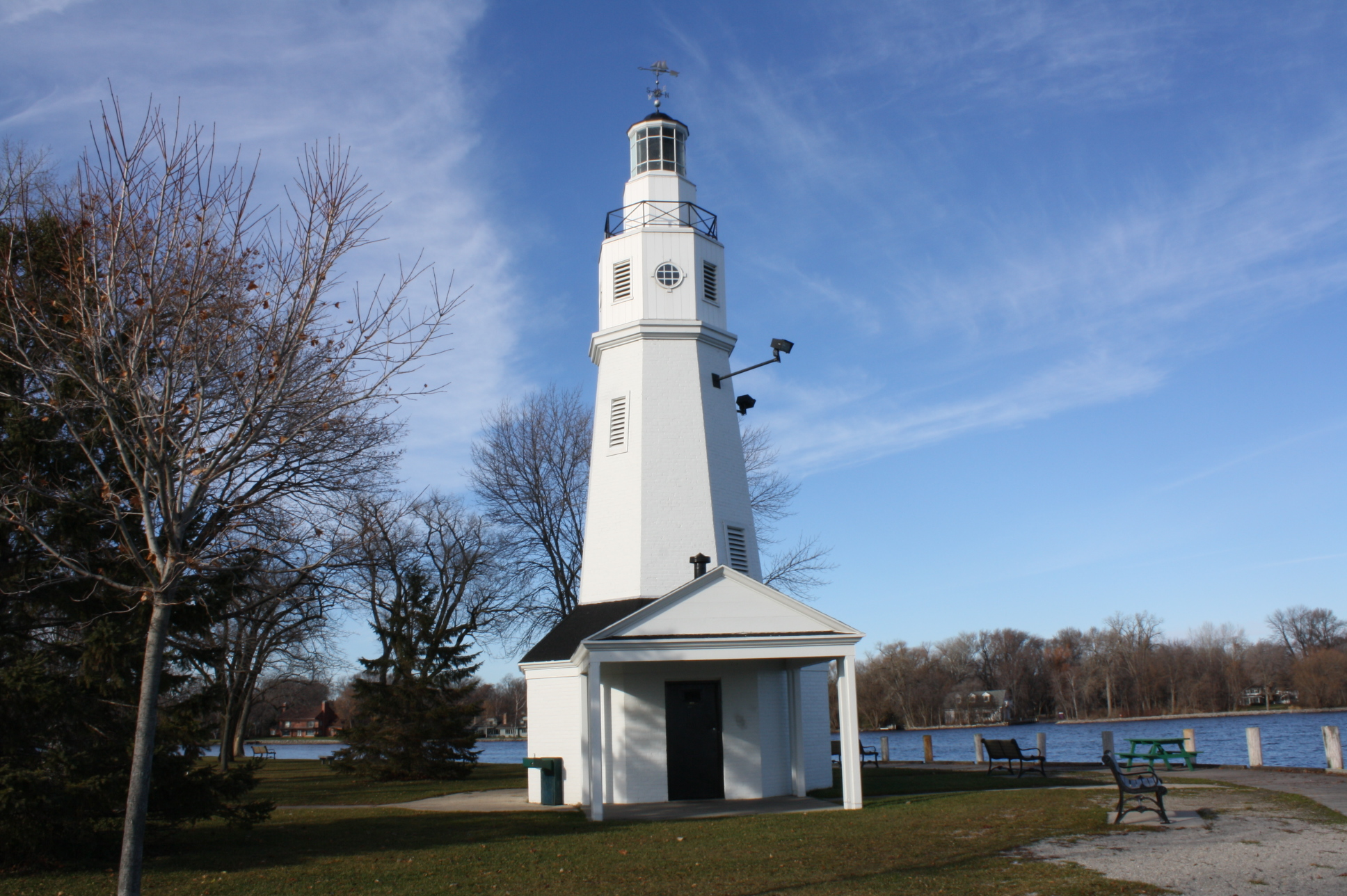
Kimberly Point Lighthouse on Neenah Point

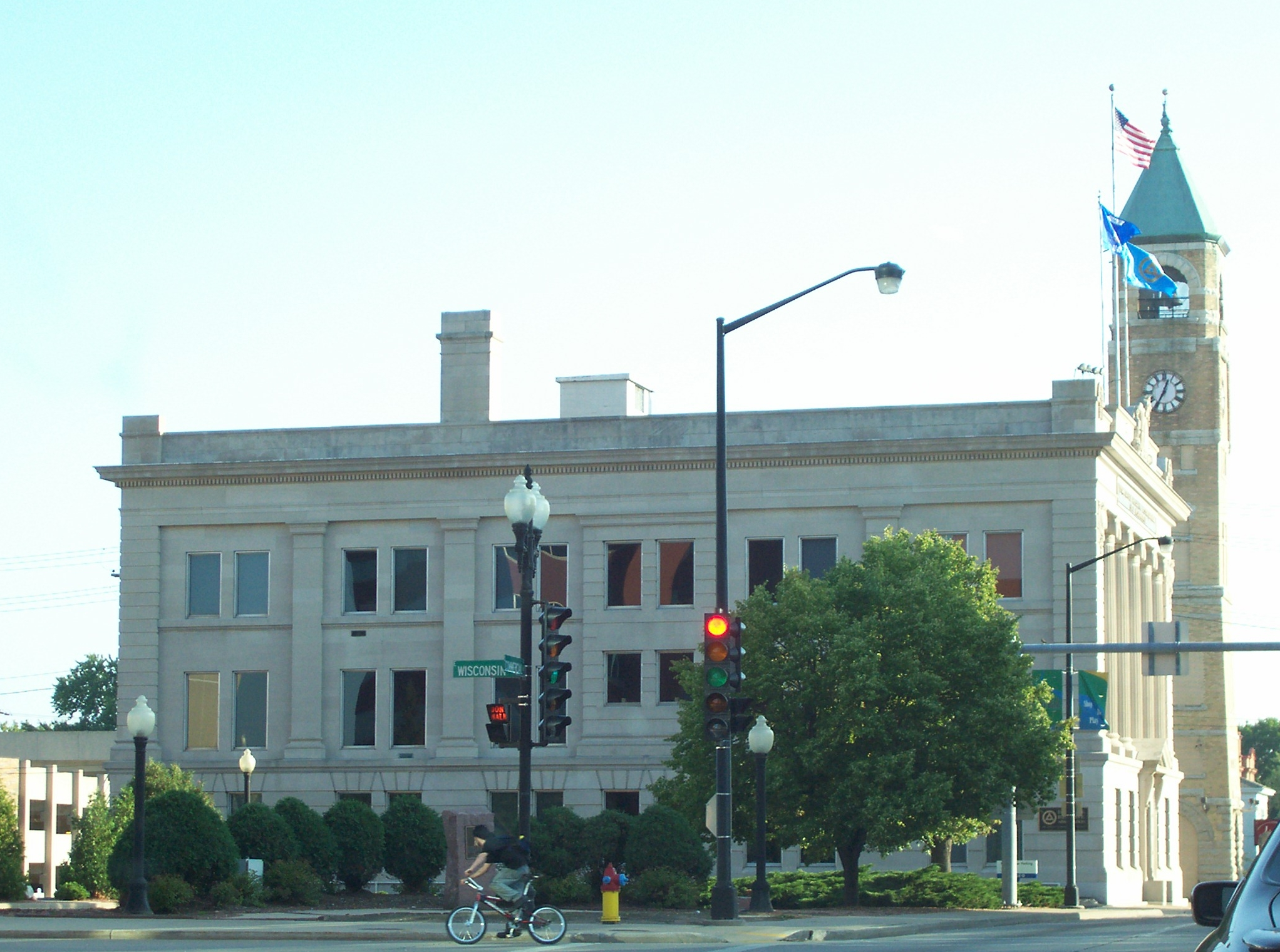
Neenah City Hall

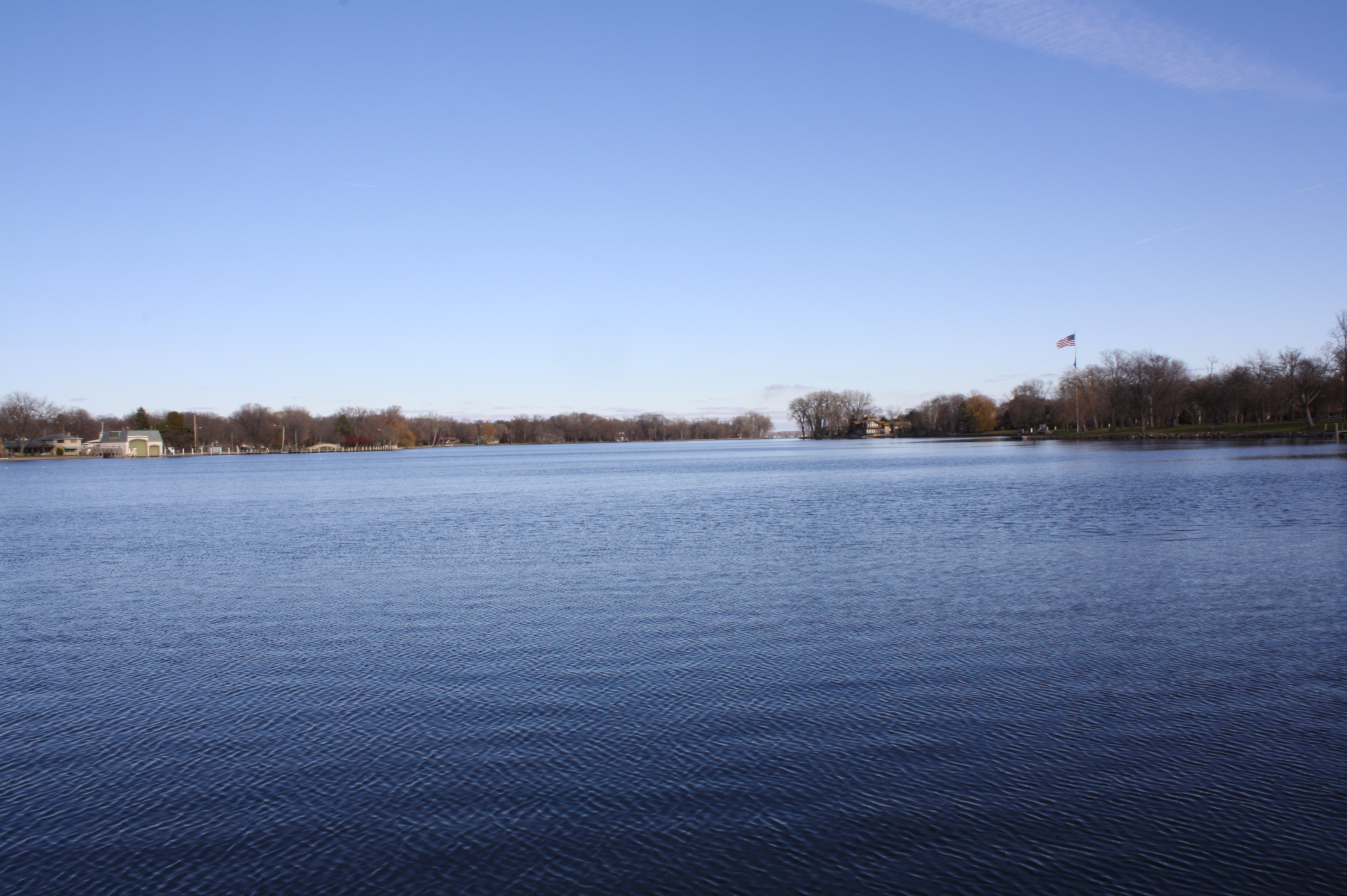
Doty Island viewed from Neenah

== List of past representatives ==
List of representatives to the Wisconsin State Assembly from the 53rd district
Member	Party	Residence	Counties represented	Term start	Term end	Ref.
District created
James R. Lewis	Rep.	West Bend	Dodge, Fond du Lac, Washington	January 1, 1973	November 21, 1979	
--Vacant--			Dodge, Fond du Lac, Washington	November 21, 1979	February 6, 1980	
Mary Panzer	Rep.	West Bend	Dodge, Fond du Lac, Washington	February 6, 1980	January 3, 1983	
Cletus J. Vanderperren	Dem.	Pittsfield	Brown	January 3, 1983	January 7, 1985	
Mary Panzer	Rep.	West Bend	Fond du Lac, Ozaukee, Sheboygan, Washington	January 7, 1985	January 4, 1993	
Carol Owens	Rep.	Oshkosh	Dodge, Fond du Lac, Winnebago	January 4, 1993	January 5, 2009	
Richard Spanbauer	Rep.	Algoma	Dodge, Fond du Lac, Winnebago	January 5, 2009	January 7, 2013	
Michael Schraa	Rep.	Oshkosh	Dodge, Fond du Lac, Winnebago	January 7, 2013	January 6, 2025	
Dean Kaufert	Rep.	Neenah	Outagamie, Winnebago	January 6, 2025	Current	
