= Jesse Peters =

American politician

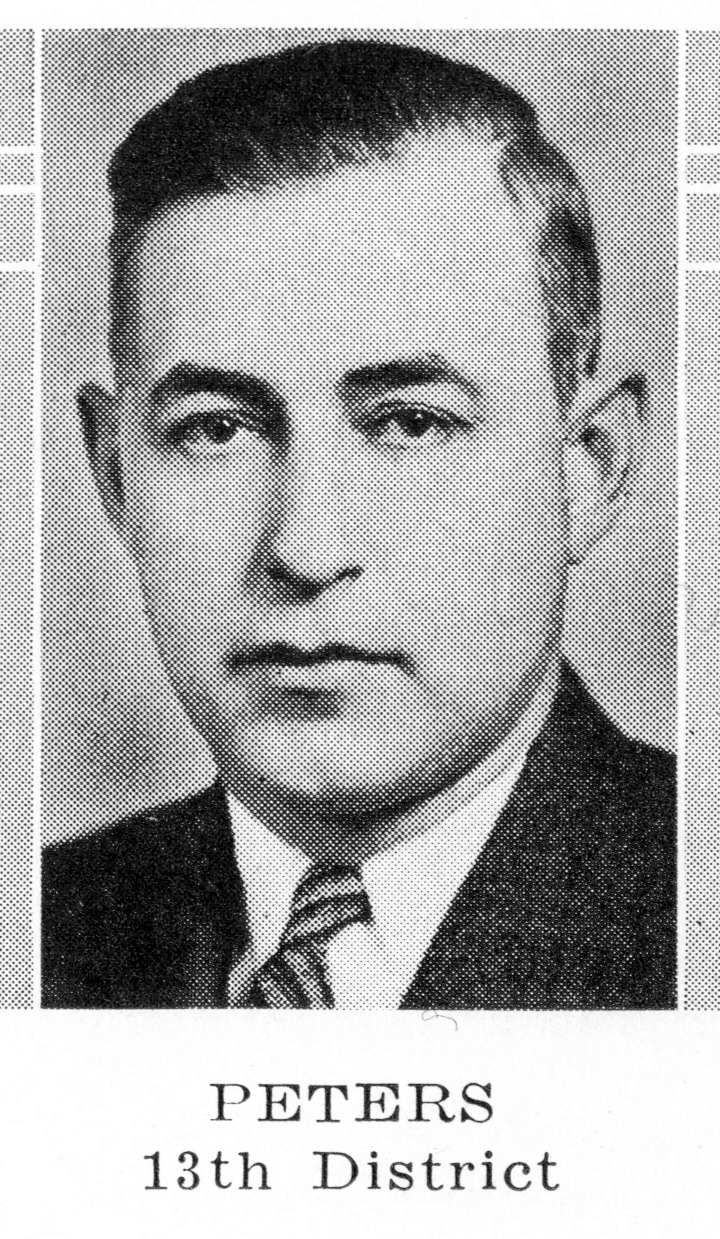
Jesse M. Peters

Jesse M. Peters (July 21, 1897 – March 7, 1962) was a member of the Wisconsin State Senate.

== Biography ==
Peters was born in Iron Ridge, Wisconsin. During World War I, he served in the United States Army. He died on March 7, 1962, in Hartford, Wisconsin.

== Political career ==
Peters was a member of the Senate from 1939 to 1942. Previously, he was District Attorney of Washington County, Wisconsin from 1929 to 1930. He was a Republican.
