= Hubbard, Dodge County, Wisconsin =

Hubbard, Wisconsin
- Town
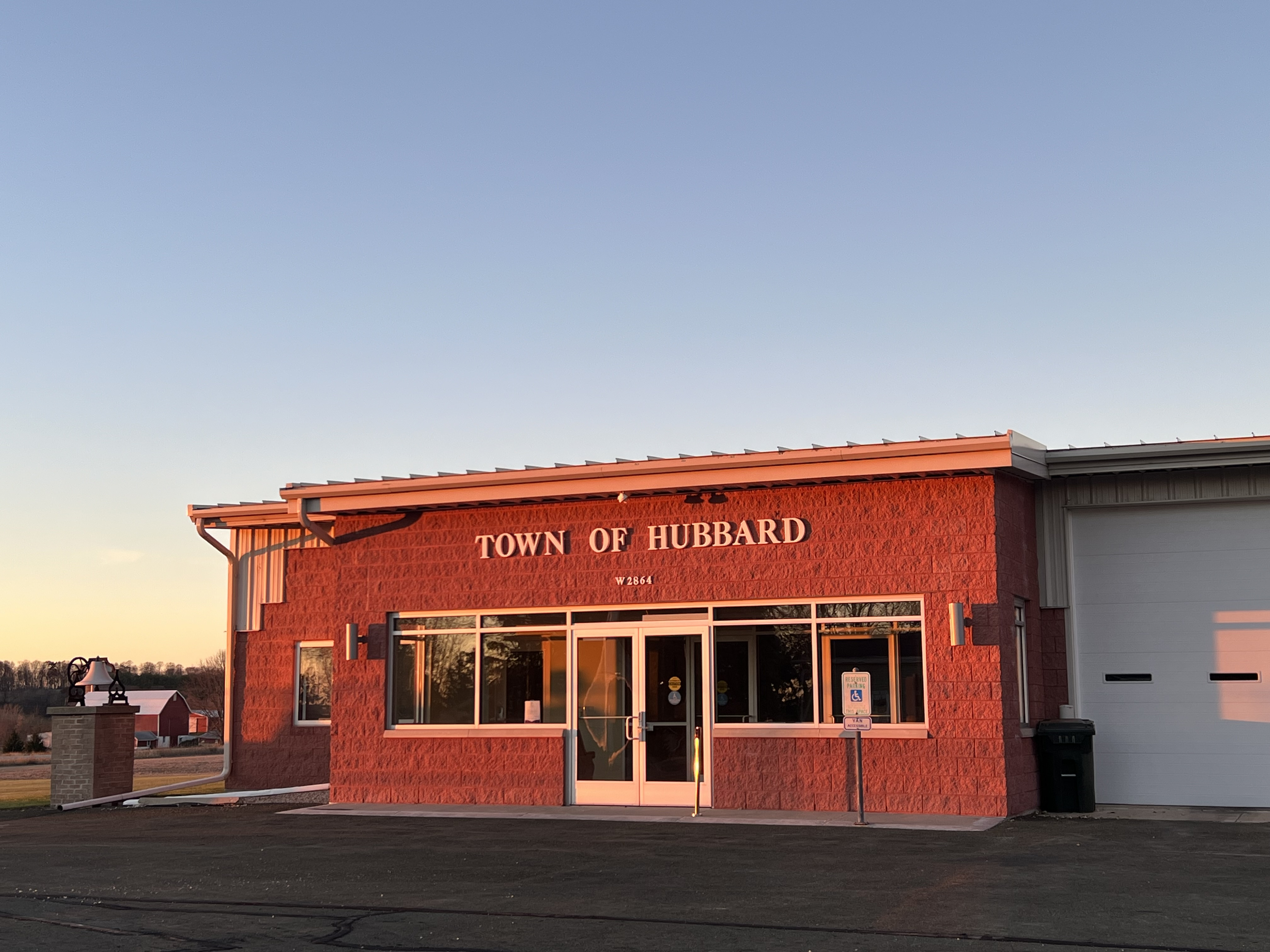

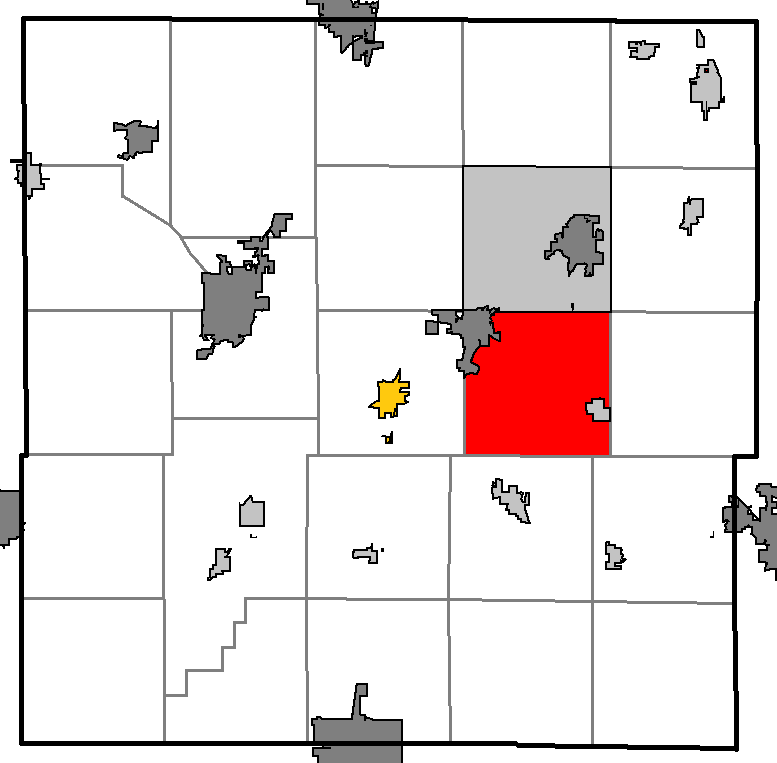
- Location of Hubbard, within Dodge County
- Coordinates: 43°24′47″N 88°34′51″W
- Country: United States
- State: Wisconsin
- County: Dodge

Area
  - Total: 33.4 sq mi (86.5 km^{2})
  - Land: 31.7 sq mi (82.2 km^{2})
  - Water: 1.7 sq mi (4.3 km^{2})
- Elevation: 869 ft (265 m)

Population (2020)
  - Total: 1,772
  - Density: 55.8/sq mi (21.6/km^{2})
- Time zone: UTC-6 (Central (CST))
  - Summer (DST): UTC-5 (CDT)
- FIPS code: 55-36100
- GNIS feature ID: 1583415
- Website: http://www.townofhubbard.com

See also Hubbard, Rusk County, Wisconsin.

Hubbard is a town in Dodge County, Wisconsin, United States. The population was 1,772 at the 2020 census. The unincorporated community of Neda is located in the town. The town is named for Henry Hubbard, the governor of New Hampshire from 1842 to 1844.

== Geography ==
According to the United States Census Bureau, the town has a total area of 33.4 square miles (86.5 km^{2}), of which 31.7 square miles (82.2 km^{2}) is land and 1.7 square miles (4.3 km^{2}) (4.97%) is water.

== Demographics ==
As of the census of 2000, there were 1,643 people, 620 households, and 479 families residing in the town. The population density was 51.8 people per square mile (20.0/km^{2}). There were 745 housing units at an average density of 23.5 per square mile (9.1/km^{2}). The racial makeup of the town was 98.78% White, 0.06% African American, 0.37% Native American, 0.43% Asian, 0.18% from other races, and 0.18% from two or more races. Hispanic or Latino of any race were 0.43% of the population.

There were 620 households, out of which 29.5% had children under the age of 18 living with them, 68.2% were married couples living together, 5.6% had a female householder with no husband present, and 22.6% were non-families. 17.9% of all households were made up of individuals, and 6.8% had someone living alone who was 65 years of age or older. The average household size was 2.65 and the average family size was 2.99.

In the town, the population was spread out, with 23.9% under the age of 18, 6.6% from 18 to 24, 28.7% from 25 to 44, 28.0% from 45 to 64, and 12.9% who were 65 years of age or older. The median age was 40 years. For every 100 females, there were 108.0 males. For every 100 females age 18 and over, there were 108.2 males.

The median income for a household in the town was $51,250, and the median income for a family was $56,667. Males had a median income of $40,164 versus $27,083 for females. The per capita income for the town was $23,142. About 3.9% of families and 5.9% of the population were below the poverty line, including 7.9% of those under age 18 and 9.6% of those age 65 or over.

== Notable people ==
- Frank E. Panzer, politician and businessman
