= First ladies of Wisconsin =

Spouses of the governors of Wisconsin, USA

First Lady of Wisconsin
- Seal of Wisconsin

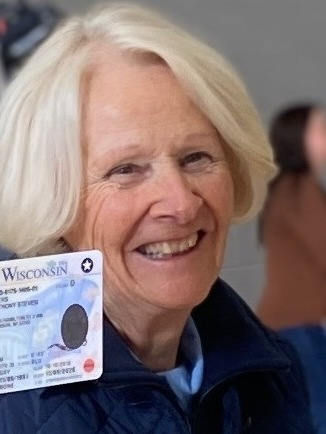
- Current; Kathy Evers since January 7, 2019
- Residence: Wisconsin Governor's Mansion
- Inaugural holder: Catherine Dunn
- Formation: June 4, 1792

The following is a list of the spouses of Wisconsin governors from 1933 to present, a position that is styled as First Lady or First Gentleman of the State of Wisconsin. As of 2017, there have been no female governors of the State of Wisconsin, and all first spouses have been first ladies.

Name	Took office	Left office	Image	Spouse of
Catherine Dunn	1848	1852		Nelson Dewey
Frances Cross	1852	1854		Leonard J. Farwell
Aurelia Belcher	1856	1856		Arthur MacArthur Sr.
Frances Forman	1856	1858		Coles Bashford
Cordelia Perrine	1862	1862		Louis P. Harvey
Elise Salomon	1862	1964		Edward Salomon
Orlina Sturgis	1864	1866		James T. Lewis
Frances Bull	1866	1872		Lucius Fairchild
Jeanette Garr	1872	1874		Cadwallader C. Washburn
Catherine Hurd	1874	1876		William Robert Taylor
E. Macy Tobey	1876	1878		Harrison Ludington
Mary Booth	1878	1882		William E. Smith
Agnes Bragg	1889	1891		William D. Hoard
Francena Rowley	1891	1895		George Wilbur Peck
Mary Kelly	1895	1897		William H. Upham
Agnes Potter	1897	1901		Edward Scofield
Belle Case	1901	1906		Robert M. La Follette, Sr.
Helen Bliss	1906	1911		James O. Davidson
Bertha Schweke	1915	1921		Emanuel L. Philipp
Anna McSpaden	1921	1927		John J. Blaine
Charlotte Schroeder	1929	1931		Walter J. Kohler Sr.
Isabel Bacon	1931	1933		Philip La Follette
Katherine Regan (née Judefind)	1933	1935		Albert G. Schmedeman
Isabel Bacon	1935	1939		Philip La Follette
Elizabeth Conrad	1939	1943		Julius P. Heil
Myrtle Ennor Oliver Thye	1943	1947		Walter Samuel Goodland
Mary Fowler	1947	1951		Oscar Rennebohm
Celeste McVoy Holden	1951	1957		Walter J. Kohler Jr.
Helen Davis Thomson	1957	1959		Vernon Wallace Thomson
Carrie Lee Dotson	1959	1963		Gaylord Nelson
Patricia Ann Brady	1963	1965		John W. Reynolds, Jr.
Dorothy Guidry	1965	1971		Warren P. Knowles
Jean Vlasis Lucey	1971	1977		Patrick Joseph Lucey
Elaine Schreiber (née Thaney)	1977	1979		Martin J. Schreiber
Joyce Dreyfus (née Unke)	1979	1983		Lee S. Dreyfus
Sheila Coyle Earl	1983	1987		Tony Earl
Sue Ann Thompson (née Mashak)	1987	2001		Tommy Thompson
Laurie McCallum	2001	2003		Scott McCallum
Jessica Doyle (née Laird)	2003	2010		Jim Doyle
Tonette Walker (née Tarantino)	2011	2019		Scott Walker
Kathy Evers (née Noordyk)	2019	Present		Tony Evers

== Sources ==
- Wisconsin Historical Society
