= Tonette Walker =

Former First Lady of Wisconsin

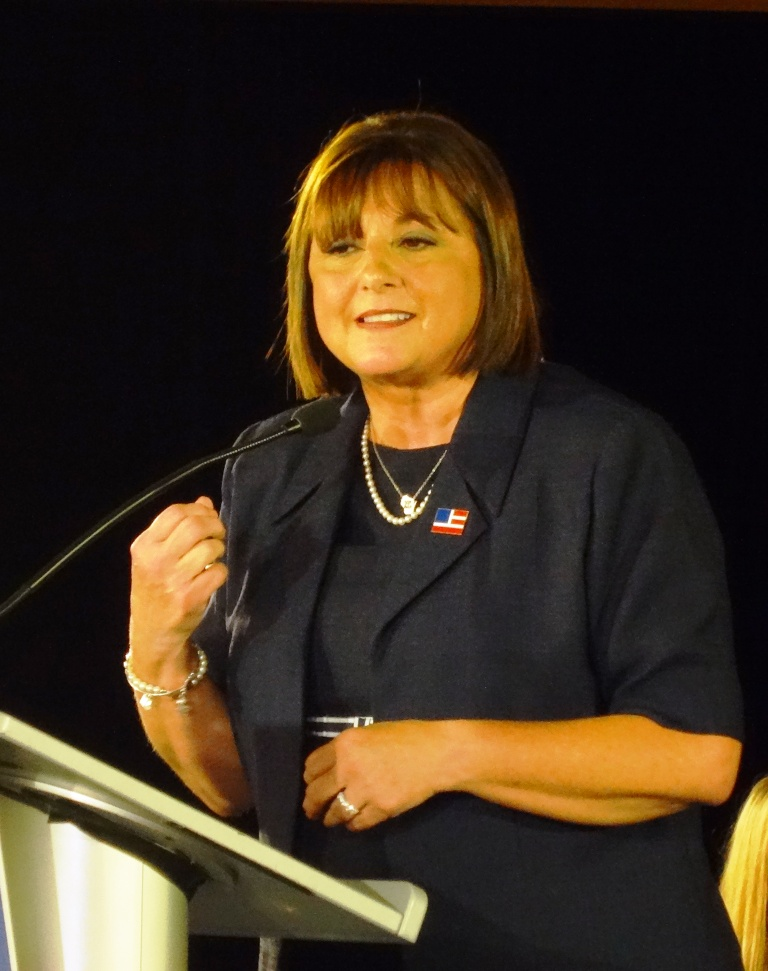
- Walker in 2015

First Lady of Wisconsin
- In role January 3, 2011 – January 7, 2019
- Governor: Scott Walker
- Preceded by: Jessica Doyle
- Succeeded by: Kathy Evers

Personal details
- Born: Tonette Marie Tarantino; October 19, 1955 (age 69); Milwaukee, Wisconsin, U.S.
- Political party: Republican
- Spouse: Scott Walker (m. 1993)
- Children: 2

Tonette Marie Tarantino Walker (born October 19, 1955) served as the first lady of Wisconsin from 2011–2019 as the wife of Scott Walker, the 45th governor of Wisconsin.

== Early life and family ==
Tonette Marie Tarantino was born on October 19, 1955, in Milwaukee, Wisconsin, the daughter of Geraldine Marie (Minorik) and Anthony "Tony" Tarantino. Her father's family was Sicilian. She spent more than 20 years employed in the insurance industry before working for the American Diabetes Association. She was raised Catholic.

== First Lady of Wisconsin ==
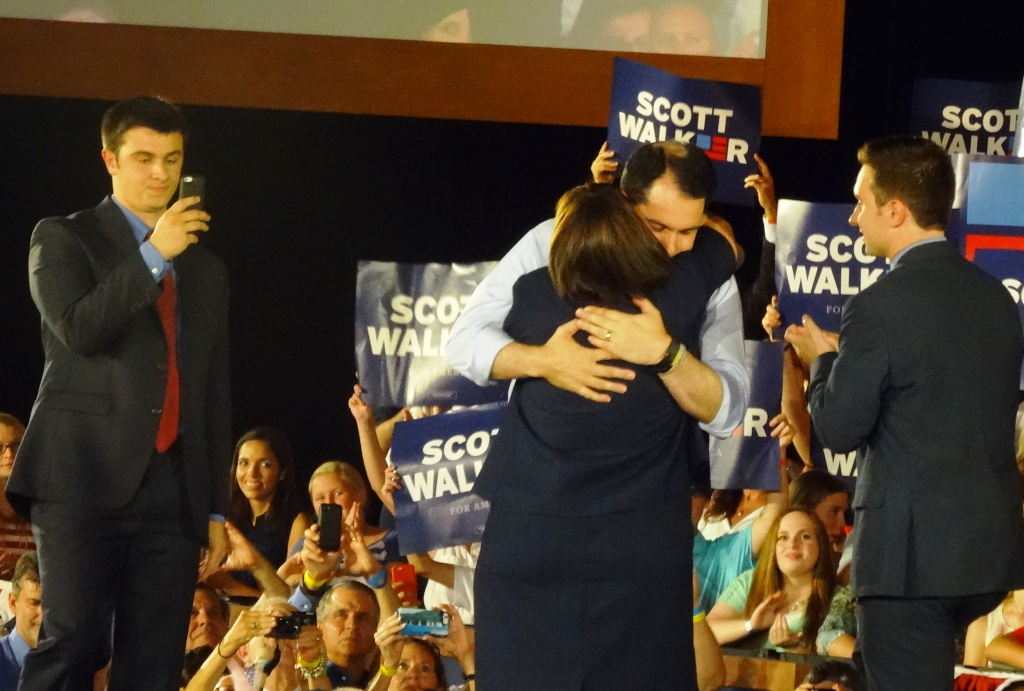
Walker embraces her husband Scott Walker, 2015

In her capacity as the First Lady of Wisconsin, Walker worked in partnership with various foundations and non-profit organizations to better recognize, understand, and address the effects of trauma on the lives of children and families in Wisconsin. Walker also worked regularly with Teen Challenge of Wisconsin, a faith-based organization dedicated to the healing and rehabilitation of teens and young adults with substance abuse addictions.

In response to the devastating Japanese tsunami and earthquakes of 2011, Walker spearheaded the Wisconsin-Chiba Japan Relief Project, an ongoing effort to provide financial assistance to Japan.

In 2011, Walker launched a monthly "Walk with Walker" event on local trails in the State of Wisconsin in partnership with the Wisconsin Department of Tourism to feature the natural scenery and beauty of the state. Walker also presents a Wisconsin Heroes Award each month. The award goes to a resident who voluntarily devotes his or her time and energy to a non-profit organization or cause.

During the 2012 Wisconsin recall effort, Walker frequently gave speeches and delivered messages in support of her husband, telling supporters not to be ruled by anger, assuring them that Republican reforms were working, and thanking them for their support. She received threats during that time on her life and the lives of her husband and sons.

In August 2012, Walker met with First Lady of the United States Michelle Obama prior to Michelle Obama's visit with the family members of the victims and those seriously injured in the shooting at a Sikh temple in Oak Creek.

Walker works in the development department for the American Lung Association.

== Personal life ==
Walker married her first husband when she was 23, but he died of kidney disease by the time she was 30. Five years after her first husband's death, she was at a karaoke night at Saz's State House restaurant when she first met Scott Walker, 12 years her junior. She and Walker wed in 1993 and are parents to two sons, Matt and Alex.

Honorary titles
Preceded by Jessica Doyle	First Lady of Wisconsin; 2011–2019	Succeeded by Kathy Evers
