= Mike Rohrkaste =

American businessman and politician (born 1958)

Member of the Wisconsin State Assembly from the 55th district
- In office January 5, 2015 – January 4, 2021
- Preceded by: Dean Kaufert
- Succeeded by: Rachael Cabral-Guevara

Personal details
- Born: September 24, 1958 (age 68) Dayton, Ohio, U.S.
- Party: Republican
- Spouse: Debbie
- Children: 2
- Education: Michigan State University (B.S.)
- Website: Official website

Mike Rohrkaste (born September 24, 1958) is an American businessman and politician. A Republican, he was a member of the Wisconsin State Assembly from 2015 to 2021, representing Neenah, Grand Chute, and northeast Winnebago County.

== Early life ==
Born in Dayton, Ohio, Rohrkaste graduated from Chaminade-Julienne High School in Dayton. He received his bachelor's degree in social science and master's degree in labor and industrial relations from Michigan State University.

== Career ==
Rohrkaste moved to Neenah, Wisconsin, in 1994. He worked for Miller Brewing Company, Menasha Corporation, and Oshkosh Corporation, before retiring from Oshkosh Corporation in 2014 as Chief Human Resources Officer. That same year, on November 4, Rohrkaste was elected to the Wisconsin State Assembly. He was re-elected in 2016 and 2018, but is not seeking re-election in 2020.

Wisconsin State Assembly
Preceded by Dean Kaufert	Member of the Wisconsin State Assembly from the 55th district January 5, 2015 – January 4, 2021	Succeeded by Rachael Cabral-Guevara
