= Mary Panzer =

American banker and politician

Mary E. Panzer

Majority Leader of the Wisconsin Senate
- In office January 6, 2003 – January 3, 2005
- Preceded by: Russ Decker & Fred Risser (acting co-leaders)
- Succeeded by: Dale Schultz

Minority Leader of the Wisconsin Senate
- In office January 25, 2000 – January 6, 2003
- Preceded by: Michael Ellis
- Succeeded by: Jon Erpenbach

Member of the Wisconsin Senate from the 20th district
- In office September 30, 1993 – January 3, 2005
- Preceded by: Donald K. Stitt
- Succeeded by: Glenn Grothman

Member of the Wisconsin State Assembly
- In office January 4, 1993 – September 30, 1993
- Preceded by: Michael A. Lehman
- Succeeded by: Glenn Grothman
- Constituency: 59th district
- In office January 7, 1985 – January 4, 1993
- Preceded by: Cletus J. Vanderperren
- Succeeded by: Carol Owens
- Constituency: 53rd district
- In office January 3, 1983 – January 7, 1985
- Preceded by: Patricia A. Goodrich
- Succeeded by: Marlin Schneider
- Constituency: 72nd district
- In office February 6, 1980 – January 3, 1983
- Preceded by: James R. Lewis
- Succeeded by: Cletus J. Vanderperren
- Constituency: 53rd district

Personal details
- Born: September 19, 1951 (age 75) Waupun, Wisconsin, U.S.
- Party: Republican
- Parent: Frank E. Panzer (father)
- Education: University of Wisconsin, Madison (BA)
- Profession: banker

Mary E. Panzer (September 19, 1951) is an American lobbyist, banker, and former politician from Washington County, Wisconsin. A Republican, she served 25 years in the Wisconsin Legislature, including 11 years in the Wisconsin Senate (1993–2005) and 14 years in the State Assembly (1980–1993). In her last five years in office, she was floor leader of the Republicans in the Senate, serving as majority leader for the 2003–2004 term. Since leaving office, she has worked as a consultant and lobbyist in Madison, Wisconsin, with her firm Panzer Public Affairs Consulting, LLC.

Her father, Frank E. Panzer, was one of the longest-serving state legislators in Wisconsin history, having served more than 34 years in the Wisconsin Senate, from the 1930s through the 1960s.

== Biography ==
Born in Waupun, Wisconsin, Panzer was educated at the University of Wisconsin–Madison, after which she was a banker and worked in the Wisconsin State Legislature.

In 1980, Panzer was elected to the Wisconsin State Assembly in a special election to replace fellow Republican James R. Lewis (who had been convicted of perjury). (She had almost defeated then-incumbent Lewis in the 1974 Republican primary.) She served until 1993, when she was elected to the Wisconsin State Senate in another special election. Panzer eventually rose to be the majority leader of the senate.

In the Republican primary election in September 2004, Panzer was herself defeated for renomination by her successor in the state assembly, Glenn Grothman, who alleged that she was not sufficiently conservative for the modern-day Republican Party. Grothman won with a vote of 79% to 21% for Panzer.

After leaving office, Panzer started Panzer Public Affairs Consulting in Madison, Wisconsin, and has worked as a lobbyist and government affairs consultant since that time.

Wisconsin State Assembly
Preceded by James R. Lewis	Member of the Wisconsin State Assembly from the 53rd district February 6, 1980–January 3, 1983	Succeeded by Cletus J. Vanderperren
Preceded by Patricia A. Goodrich	Member of the Wisconsin State Assembly from the 72nd district January 3, 1983–January 7, 1985	Succeeded by Marlin Schneider
Preceded by Cletus J. Vanderperren	Member of the Wisconsin State Assembly from the 53rd district January 7, 1985–January 4, 1993	Succeeded by Carol Owens
Preceded by Michael A. Lehman	Member of the Wisconsin State Assembly from the 59th district January 4, 1993–September 30, 1993	Succeeded by Glenn Grothman
Wisconsin Senate
Preceded by Donald K. Stitt	Member of the Wisconsin Senate from the 20th district September 30, 1993–January 3, 2005	Succeeded by Glenn Grothman
Preceded by Michael Ellis	Minority Leader of the Wisconsin Senate; January 25, 2000–January 6, 2003	Succeeded by Jon Erpenbach
Preceded by Russ Decker & Fred Risser (acting co-leaders)	Majority Leader of the Wisconsin Senate; January 6, 2003–January 3, 2005	Succeeded by Dale Schultz
