= Lorenz Becker =

American politician from Wisconsin (1889–1952)

Lorenz Becker (August 10, 1889 – 1952) was an American politician, belonging to the Wisconsin State Assembly. He was elected in 1932 as a Democrat. Becker was born on August 10, 1889, in Woodland, Dodge County, Wisconsin.
