= Neenah Light =

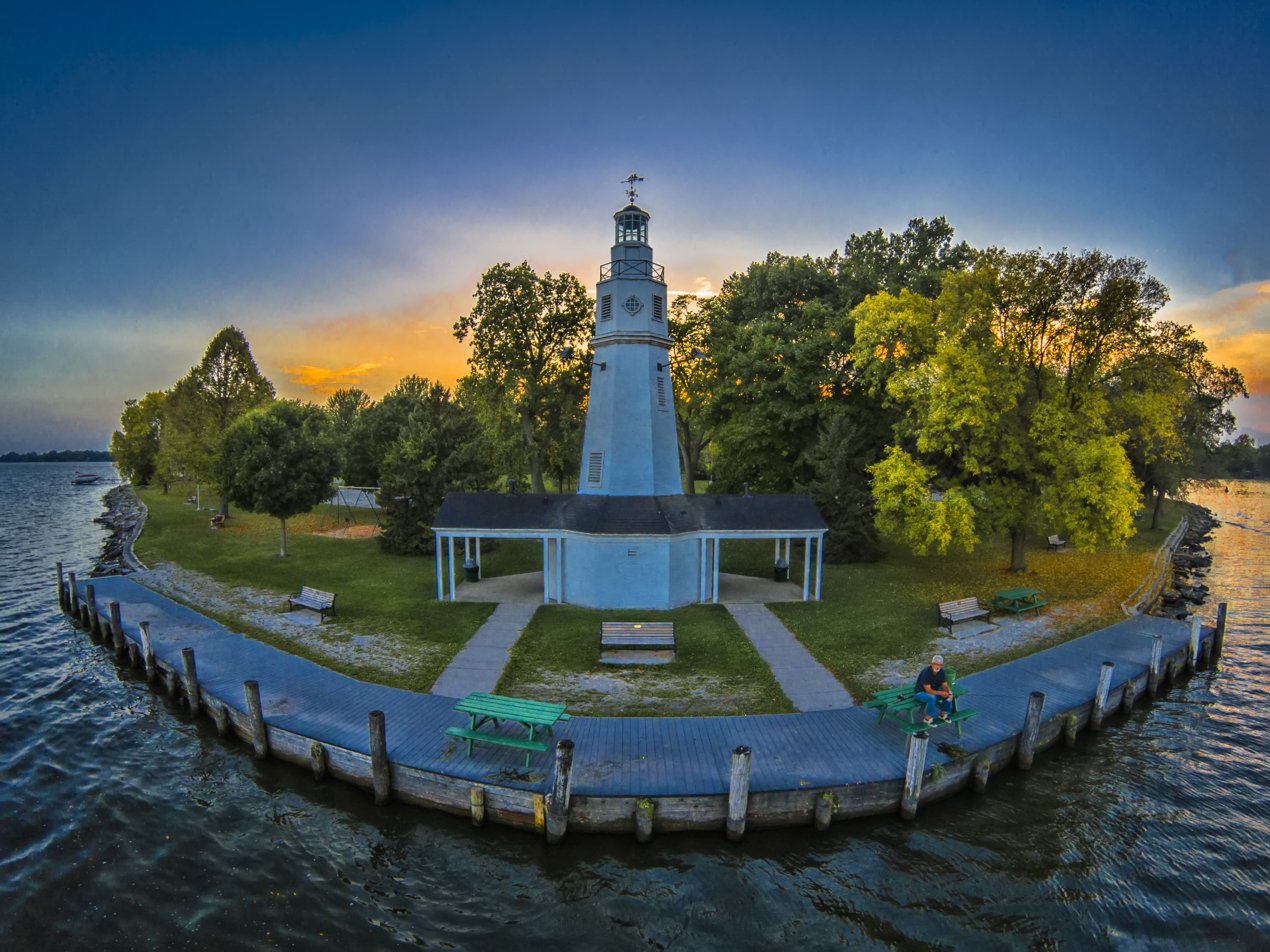
- Neenah Lighthouse
- Location: Neenah, Wisconsin
- Coordinates: 44°11′7.8″N 88°26′29″W

Tower
- Constructed: 1945
- Height: 49 feet (15 m)
- Heritage: National Register of Historic Places listed place

Light
- First lit: 1945
- Focal height: 15 m (49 ft)
- Characteristic: Fl W 4.5s
- Kimberly Point Park Lighthouse
- U.S. National Register of Historic Places
- Area: less than one acre
- Built: 1945
- Built by: Flour Brothers Construction Company
- Architectural style: Colonial Revival
- NRHP reference No.: 12001275
- Added to NRHP: February 5, 2013

The Neenah Light (also known as the Kimberly Point Lighthouse) is located in Kimberly Point Park in Neenah, Wisconsin. The lighthouse marks the entrance of Lake Winnebago into the Lower Fox River.

== History ==
The City of Neenah began in 1835 as an agricultural and industrial mission for the Menominee Indians. It was named after the American Indian term for water. After the Civil War, rail transportation was a large factor in the growth of Neenah's local economy. One major outcome of this was the development of the Kimberly-Clark Corporation in 1872. John Alfred Kimberly was one of four men who started this successful company. In 1929, Helen Kimberly Stuart (daughter of J. A. Kimberly) donated some land to the City of Neenah. This land, which overlooked the confluence of Lake Winnebago and the Fox River, was named Kimberly Point Park. In 1944, J. C. Kimberly (son of J. A. Kimberly) realized there was a need for a light to mark the entrance to the river. He donated the $7,500 and hired Flour Brothers Construction Company of nearby Oshkosh for the construction of a 40-foot (12 m), brick and Haydite block lighthouse. The lighthouse began guiding boaters into the Neenah Harbor in 1945. It was later raised to 49 feet (15 m) in 1954.

In order to protect the site's historic character, the Neenah Landmarks Commission added Kimberly Point Lighthouse to the municipal Register of Historic Places in 2009. Three years later, the lighthouse was added to the Wisconsin State Register of Historic Places, and in 2013 it was approved for the National Register of Historic Places.
