= Hubbard, Rusk County, Wisconsin =

Hubbard, Wisconsin
- Town
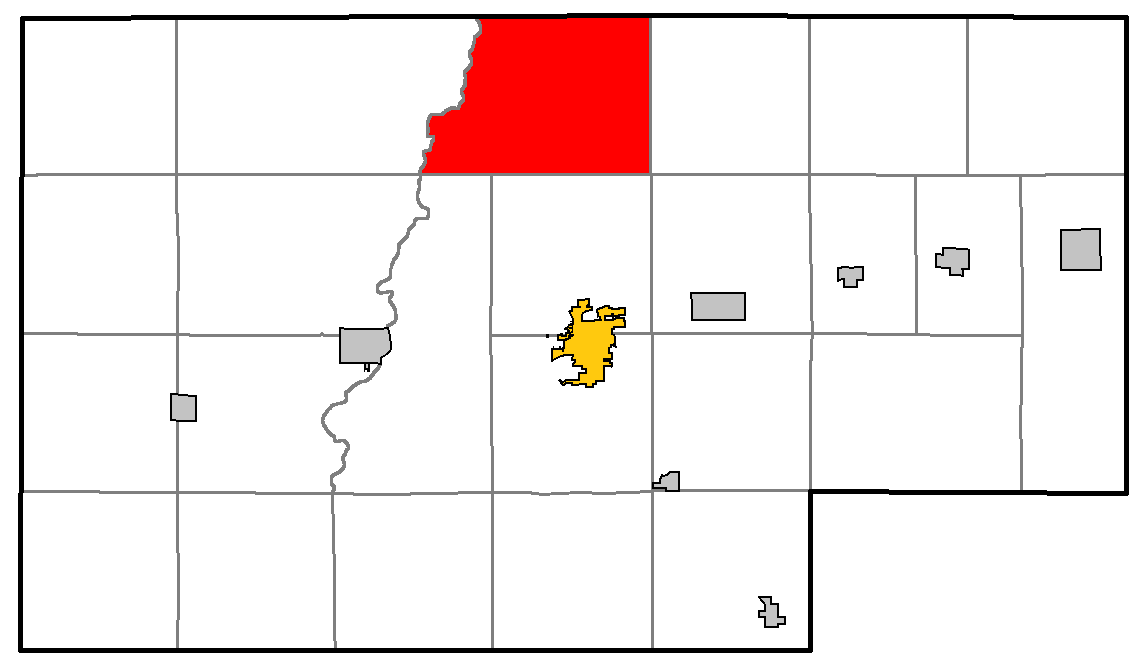
- Location of Hubbard, within Rusk County

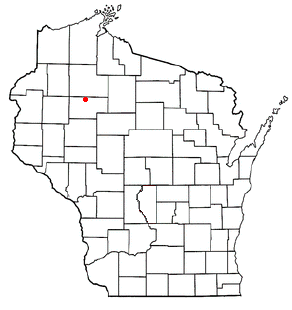
- Location of Hubbard, Rusk County, Wisconsin
- Coordinates: 45°34′39″N 91°10′8″W
- Country: United States
- State: Wisconsin
- County: Rusk

Area
  - Total: 44.7 sq mi (115.7 km^{2})
  - Land: 44.1 sq mi (114.2 km^{2})
  - Water: 0.58 sq mi (1.5 km^{2})
- Elevation: 1,198 ft (365 m)

Population (2020)
  - Total: 178
  - Density: 4.04/sq mi (1.56/km^{2})
- Time zone: UTC-6 (Central (CST))
  - Summer (DST): UTC-5 (CDT)
- Area codes: 715 & 534
- FIPS code: 55-36125
- GNIS feature ID: 1583416

See also, Hubbard, Dodge County, Wisconsin.

Hubbard is a town in Rusk County, Wisconsin, United States. The population was 178 at the 2020 census. The town was likely named for Arthur O. Hubbard, a manufacturer based in Minnesota.

== Geography ==
According to the United States Census Bureau, the town has a total area of 44.7 square miles (115.7 km^{2}), of which 44.1 square miles (114.2 km^{2}) is land and 0.6 square mile (1.5 km^{2}) (1.30%) is water.

== Demographics ==
As of the census of 2000, there were 168 people, 69 households, and 50 families residing in the town. The population density was 3.8 people per square mile (1.5/km^{2}). There were 83 housing units at an average density of 1.9 per square mile (0.7/km^{2}). The racial makeup of the town was 97.02% White, 2.38% Asian, and 0.60% from two or more races.

There were 69 households, out of which 21.7% had children under the age of 18 living with them, 65.2% were married couples living together, 4.3% had a female householder with no husband present, and 27.5% were non-families. 24.6% of all households were made up of individuals, and 8.7% had someone living alone who was 65 years of age or older. The average household size was 2.43 and the average family size was 2.80.

In the town, the population was spread out, with 20.8% under the age of 18, 9.5% from 18 to 24, 20.8% from 25 to 44, 29.8% from 45 to 64, and 19.0% who were 65 years of age or older. The median age was 44 years. For every 100 females, there were 118.2 males. For every 100 females age 18 and over, there were 118.0 males.

The median income for a household in the town was $35,625, and the median income for a family was $38,594. Males had a median income of $27,083 versus $22,292 for females. The per capita income for the town was $20,315. About 5.7% of families and 11.2% of the population were below the poverty line, including 23.7% of those under the age of eighteen and 6.9% of those 65 or over.
