= Esther K. Walling =

American politician (1940–2017)

Esther Kolb Walling (April 7, 1940 – February 1, 2017) was a former member of the Wisconsin State Assembly.

== Biography ==
Walling was born on April 7, 1940, in Winnebago County, Wisconsin. She graduated from Oshkosh High School in Oshkosh, Wisconsin, as well as the University of Wisconsin–Oshkosh. Walling was married with two children. She was a realtor. Walling died on February 1, 2017, from cancer.

== Career ==
Walling served in the Wisconsin Assembly from 1983 to 1989. Previously, she was Clerk of the Town of Menasha, Wisconsin from 1975 to 1977 and town chairperson from 1977 to 1981. She was a Republican.
