= Michael Schraa =

American businessman and politician

Member of the Wisconsin State Assembly from the 53rd district
- In office January 7, 2013 – January 6, 2025
- Preceded by: Richard Spanbauer
- Succeeded by: Dean Kaufert

Personal details
- Born: April 17, 1961 (age 65) Fort Carson, Colorado, U.S.
- Party: Republican
- Education: University of Wisconsin–Oshkosh
- Occupation: Restaurant owner

Michael Schraa (born April 17, 1961) is an American businessman and former Republican politician from Oshkosh, Wisconsin. He served six terms as a member of the Wisconsin State Assembly, representing Wisconsin's 53rd Assembly district from 2013 to 2025.

== Biography ==
Born in Fort Carson, Colorado, Schraa attended University of Wisconsin–Oshkosh. Schraa is a business owner and former stock broker. In November 2012, Schraa was elected to the Wisconsin State Assembly, as a Republican.

He was trained by American Majority.

Michael is also the owner of Leons Frozen Custard in Oshkosh, Wisconsin, in between his government duties.

Wisconsin State Assembly
Preceded by Richard Spanbauer	Member of the Wisconsin State Assembly from the 53rd district January 7, 2013 – January 6, 2025	Succeeded by Dean Kaufert
