= Michael W. Grebe =

American lawyer

- Born: October 25, 1940 (age 85); Illinois, U.S.
- Citizenship: United States
- Education: University of Michigan
- Board member of: Charter School Growth Fund; Bradley Foundation; BMO Harris Bradley Center; Philanthropy Roundtable

Michael William Grebe (born October 25, 1940) is an American lawyer, businessman and conservative activist. He was the chairman and CEO of the law firm Foley & Lardner from 1994 to 2002. From 2002 through 2016, he was President and Chief Executive Officer of the Bradley Foundation. He is the former chairman of the Philanthropy Roundtable.

== Early life ==
Grebe grew up in Farmington, Illinois, and played quarterback on his high school football team. He graduated from the United States Military Academy with a B.S. in 1962 and received a J.D. from the University of Michigan Law School in 1970, magna cum laude. Grebe served in the United States Army during the Vietnam War and was later awarded the Combat Infantryman’s Badge and two Bronze Stars. He was on active duty from 1962 to 1967 and attained the rank of captain.

== Career ==
Grebe joined the law firm Foley & Lardner in 1970, and became a partner in 1977, focusing on corporate and financial law. He was chairman and CEO from 1994, until he retired in 2002, when he became chairman and CEO of the Bradley Foundation. He also was Chairman of the Philanthropy Roundtable.

He has been on the board of directors of the Oshkosh Corporation since 1990. He also sits on the board of the Church Mutual Insurance Company. He is a former member and president of the board of regents for the University of Wisconsin System and past member and chairman of the board of visitors of his alma mater, the United States Military Academy. He has also sat on the board of the Hoover Institution at Stanford University and the Milwaukee Brewers baseball club. He sits on the board of the Charter School Growth Fund. He sits on the publication committee of National Affairs. He is also on the board of directors of the BMO Harris Bradley Center

He is a former general counsel to the Republican National Committee and was the Republican National Committeeman for Wisconsin from 1984 to 2002. He was a delegate to Republican National Conventions from 1984 to 2000. In 2010, he chaired Scott Walker's campaign for governorship of Wisconsin.

== Personal life ==
Grebe's first wife, Peggy, died in 2003. They had 2 children, a son and a daughter. He married Patricia Perry in 2005. They live in Milwaukee, Wisconsin. In 2015, Wisconsin Governor Walker appointed Grebe's son, Michael M. Grebe, to UW Board of Regents.
