= 2021 Wisconsin elections =

- April 6, 2021

The 2021 Wisconsin Spring Election was held in the U.S. state of Wisconsin on April 6, 2021. There was one statewide race—for Superintendent of Public Instruction. Additionally, two special elections occurred for the Wisconsin State Senate and Wisconsin State Assembly, as well as other nonpartisan local and judicial elections. The 2021 Spring primary was held on February 16, 2021.

An additional special election for the 37th Assembly district was held on July 13, 2021.

In the election for Superintendent of Public Instruction, the Democrats' preferred candidate, Jill Underly, prevailed. Republicans, however, won both special elections for the Wisconsin Legislature, and Republicans' preferred candidates won both contested elections for the Wisconsin Court of Appeals.

== State elections ==
=== Executive ===
==== Superintendent of Public Instruction ====
Incumbent Superintendent of Public Instruction Carolyn Stanford Taylor did not seek election to a full term. Taylor had been appointed to the seat by Governor Tony Evers, the previous Superintendent of Public Instruction, to fill the remainder of his term after he was elected Governor of Wisconsin in 2018.

Eight candidates filed petitions by the state deadline to run for election to this seat, of which, seven were approved. The office is nonpartisan, thus all accepted candidates appeared on the primary ballot on February 16, 2021. Amongst the candidates, Deborah Kerr was the only conservative, although she campaigned as a "pragmatic Democrat".

Jill Underly and Deborah Kerr won the most votes in the top-two primary, and advanced to the April 6 general election, which Underly won with 57.6% of the vote.

Wisconsin Superintendent of Public Instruction Election, 2021
Party	Candidate	Votes	%
Nonpartisan Primary, February 16, 2021
Nonpartisan	Jill Underly	88,796	27.23%
Nonpartisan	Deborah Kerr	86,174	26.43%
Nonpartisan	Sheila Briggs	50,815	15.58%
Nonpartisan	Shandowlyon Hendricks-Williams	36,850	11.30%
Nonpartisan	Troy Gunderson	27,452	8.42%
Nonpartisan	Steve Krull	20,543	6.30%
Nonpartisan	Joe Fenrick	14,507	4.45%
Write-in		937	0.29%
Total votes		326,074	100.0%
General Election, April 6, 2021
Nonpartisan	Jill Underly	526,444	57.57%
Nonpartisan	Deborah Kerr	386,570	42.27%
Write-in		1,420	0.16%
Total votes		914,434	100.0%

=== Legislative ===
==== State Senate 13th district special election ====
A special election was held concurrent with the spring primary and spring general to fill the 13th State Senate seat vacated by the resignation of Scott L. Fitzgerald.

Seven candidates filed petitions by the state deadline to run for election to this seat, of which six were approved, including three Republicans, one Democrat, and two independents. State Representative John Jagler won the Republican primary and went on to win the April special election with 51% of the vote.

2021 Wisconsin Senate 13th District Republican Primary
Party	Candidate	Votes	%
Republican	John Jagler	6,034	57.01%
Republican	Don Pridemore	3,343	31.59%
Republican	Todd Menzel	1,204	11.37%
Republican	Scattering	3	0.03%
Total votes		10,584	100.0%

2021 Wisconsin Senate 13th District Special Election
Party	Candidate	Votes	%	±%
Republican	John Jagler	19,125	50.99%	−7.91%
Democratic	Melissa Winker	16,364	43.62%	+2.87%
Independent	Spencer Zimmerman	1,702	4.54%	N/A
American Solidarity	Ben Schmitz	194	0.52%	N/A
Independent	Don Pridemore (Write-in)	85	0.23%	N/A
Write-in		41	0.11%	
Total votes		37,511	100%	
Republican hold		Swing	-5.39%	

==== State Assembly 89th district special election ====
A special election was held concurrent with the spring primary and spring general to fill the 89th State Assembly seat vacated by the resignation of John Nygren.

Five candidates filed petitions by the state deadline to run for election to this seat, all were approved, including four Republicans and one Democrat. Elijah Behnke won the Republican primary and went on to win the special election with 63% of the vote.

2021 Wisconsin Assembly 89th District Republican Primary
Party	Candidate	Votes	%
Republican	Elijah Behnke	1,691	44.75%
Republican	Michael Kunesh	875	23.15%
Republican	Debbie Jacques	789	20.88%
Republican	Michael Schneider	264	6.99%
Republican	David Kamps	160	4.23%
Total votes		3,779	100.0%

2021 Wisconsin Assembly 89th District Special Election
Party	Candidate	Votes	%	±%
Republican	Elijah Behnke	8,129	63.17%	−5.54%
Democratic	Karl Jaeger	4,732	36.77%	+5.54%
Write-in		7	0.05%	
Total votes		12,868	100%	
Republican hold		Swing	-5.54%	

==== State Assembly 37th district special election ====
A special election was held on July 13, 2021, to fill the 37th State Assembly seat vacated by the resignation of John Jagler.

Ten candidates filed petitions by the state deadline to run for this seat, all were approved, including eight Republicans, one Democrat, and one Independent. William Penterman won the June 15 Republican primary and went on to win the special election with 54% of the vote.

Wisconsin Assembly, 37th District Special Republican Primary, 2021
Party	Candidate	Votes	%
Republican	William Penterman	758	19.81%
Republican	Jennifer Meinhardt	742	19.39%
Republican	Nick Krueger	621	16.23%
Republican	Nathan Pollnow	536	14.01%
Republican	Steve Kauffeld	514	13.43%
Republican	Jenifer Quimby	434	11.34%
Republican	Cathy Houchin	182	4.76%
Republican	Spencer Zimmerman	39	1.02%
Write-in		1	0.03%
Total votes		3,827	100.0%

Wisconsin Assembly, 37th District Special Election, 2021
Party	Candidate	Votes	%	±%
Republican	William Penterman	3,742	54.10%	−2.00%
Democratic	Pete Adams	3,063	44.28%	+3.39%
Independent	Stephen Ratzlaff	112	1.62%	−1.39%
Total votes		6,917	100.0%	
Republican hold				

=== Judicial ===
==== State Court of Appeals ====
Three seats on the Wisconsin Court of Appeals were up for election in 2021, two of which were contested. Incumbent Judge Jeffrey O. Davis was defeated.

- Judge Maxine Aldridge White, appointed by Governor Tony Evers in 2020, was unopposed seeking re-election in District I.
- In District II, Judge Jeffrey O. Davis, appointed by Governor Tony Evers in 2019, was defeated by municipal judge Shelley Grogan of Muskego.
- In District III, Wisconsin circuit court judge Gregory B. Gill, Jr., of Outagamie County, defeated attorney Rick Cveykus of Wausau, to succeed retiring Judge Mark Seidl.

==== State Circuit Courts ====
Sixty three of the state's 253 circuit court seats were up for election in 2021. Eleven of those seats were contested. Three of the contested seats, in Calumet, Jackson, and Marathon counties, were newly created from a 2020 act of the Wisconsin Legislature. A fourth newly created seat, in Dunn County, had only one candidate running.

- In Bayfield County, incumbent Judge John P. Anderson defeated a challenge from attorney Vincent Scott Kurta.
- In Brown County, incumbent Judge Kendall M. Kelley defeated a challenge from attorney Rachel Maes.
- In Calumet County, attorney Carey John Reed defeated Calumet County corporation counsel Kimberly A. Tenerelli for a newly created judicial seat.
- In Dunn County, attorney Christina Mayer defeated attorney Nicholas P. Lange for the judicial seat being vacated by Judge Rod W. Smeltzer.
- In Fond du Lac County, former Green Lake County district attorney Andrew J. Christenson defeated attorney Laura Lavey to succeed outgoing judge Richard J. Nuss. Former Fond du Lac city councilmember Catherine A. Block and attorney Dawn M. Sabel were eliminated in the February primary.
- In Green County, attorney Faun Marie Phillipson defeated attorney Jane Bucher to succeed outgoing judge Jim Beer. Attorneys Peter B. Kelly and Daniel R. Bartholf were eliminated in the February primary.
- In Jackson County, attorneys Daniel Diehn and Robyn R. Matousek will compete for a newly created judicial seat.
- In Kenosha County Branch 1, incumbent Judge Larisa Benitez-Morgan was apparently defeated by former Racine County prosecutor Gerad Dougvillo.
- In Kenosha County Branch 6, deputy district attorney Angelina Gabriele defeated attorney Angela Cunningham to succeed outgoing judge Mary K. Wagner. Attorney Elizabeth Pfeuffer was eliminated in the February primary.
- In Marathon County, Marathon County corporation counsel Scott M. Corbett defeated attorney Daniel T. Cveykus for a newly created judicial seat.
- In Milwaukee County, assistant public defender Katie Kegel defeated attorney Susan Roth to replace outgoing judge Clare Fiorenza.

Circuit	Branch	Incumbent	Elected			Defeated			Defeated in Primary
Circuit	Branch	Incumbent	Name	Votes	%	Name	Votes	%	Name(s)
Adams		Daniel Glen Wood	Daniel Glen Wood	2,509	99.52%				
Bayfield		John P. Anderson	John P. Anderson	3,664	80.12%	Vincent Scott Kurta	908	19.86%	
Brown	1	Donald R. Zuidmulder	Donald R. Zuidmulder	30,018	99.21%				
Brown	4	Kendall M. Kelley	Kendall M. Kelley	30,018	57.98%	Rachel Maes	15,467	41.90%	
Brown	5	Marc A. Hammer	Marc A. Hammer	28,919	99.29%				
Calumet	1	--New Seat--	Carey John Reed	4,762	55.72%	Kimberly A. Tenerelli	3,781	44.24%	
Chippewa	2	James M. Isaacson	James M. Isaacson	6,283	99.30%				
Columbia	1	Todd J. Hepler	Todd J. Hepler	7,007	98.84%				
Dane	2	Josann M. Reynolds	Josann M. Reynolds	77,472	99.02%				
Dane	6	Nia Trammell	Nia Trammell	78,255	99.20%				
Dane	7	Mario D. White	Mario D. White	77,787	99.23%				
Dane	9	Jacob B. Frost	Jacob B. Frost	77,148	99.25%				
Dane	10	Juan B. Colás	Juan B. Colás	78,472	99.26%				
Dane	12	Chris Taylor	Chris Taylor	80,833	99.10%				
Dane	13	Julie Genovese	Julie Genovese	76,883	99.23%				
Dane	17	David Conway	David Conway	75,096	99.29%				
Douglas	1	Kelly J. Thimm	Kelly J. Thimm	4,678	99.17%				
Douglas	2	George L. Glonek	George L. Glonek	4,581	98.94%				
Dunn	2	Rod W. Smeltzer	Christina Mayer	3,496	53.71%	Nicholas P. Lange	3,013	46.29%	
Dunn	3	--New Seat--	Luke M. Wagner	5,070	100.0%				
Fond du Lac	3	Richard J. Nuss	Andrew J. Christenson	9,142	51.44%	Laura Lavey	8,625	48.53%	Catherine A. Block; Dawn M. Sabel
Grant	2	Craig R. Day	Craig R. Day	5,660	99.54%				
Green	1	James R. Beer	Faun Marie Phillipson	4,142	48.93%	Jane Bucher	4,057	47.93%	
Green	2	Thomas J. Vale	Thomas J. Vale	6,585	98.52%				
Jackson	1	Anna L. Becker	Anna L. Becker	2,959	100.0%				
Jackson	2	--New Seat--	Daniel Diehn	2,189	61.49%	Robyn R. Matousek	1,371	38.51%	
Kenosha	1	Larisa V. Benitez-Morgan	Gerad Dougvillo	10,720	50.68%	Larisa V. Benitez-Morgan	10,364	49.00%	
Kenosha	5	David P. Wilk	David P. Wilk	15,789	98.00%				
Kenosha	6	Mary K. Wagner	Angelina Gabriele	11,745	53.33%	Angela D. Cunningham	10,218	46.39%	Elizabeth Pfeuffer
Kenosha	8	Chad G. Kerkman	Chad G. Kerkman	15,476	97.94%				
La Crosse	5	Gloria L. Doyle	Gloria L. Doyle	13,828	98.08%				
Lafayette		Duane M. Jorgenson	Duane M. Jorgenson	2,852	100.0%				
Langlade		John Rhode	John Rhode	3,531	100.0%				
Marathon	1	Suzanne C. O'Neill	Suzanne C. O'Neill	17,564	98.96%				
Marathon	6	--New Seat--	Scott M. Corbett	13,772	58.19%	Daniel T. Cveykus	9,865	41.68%	
Menominee–Shawano	1	Katie Sloma	Katie Sloma	5,133	100.0%				
Milwaukee	1	Jack L. Dávila	Jack L. Dávila	62,459	98.96%				
Milwaukee	3	Clare L. Fiorenza	Katie Kegel	60,089	64.81%	Susan Roth	32,299	34.83%	
Milwaukee	6	Ellen R. Brostrom	Ellen R. Brostrom	62,100	98.84%				
Milwaukee	12	David L. Borowski	David L. Borowski	62,165	98.67%				
Milwaukee	15	J. D. Watts	J. D. Watts	62,074	98.99%				
Milwaukee	19	Kori L. Ashley	Kori L. Ashley	62,074	98.99%				
Milwaukee	22	Timothy M. Witkowiak	Timothy M. Witkowiak	61,264	98.88%				
Milwaukee	30	Jon Richards	Jon Richards	62,942	99.11%				
Milwaukee	37	T. Christopher Dee	T. Christopher Dee	61,445	99.03%				
Milwaukee	42	Reyna Morales	Reyna Morales	62,906	99.08%				
Milwaukee	46	David A. Feiss	David A. Feiss	61,130	99.05%				
Outagamie	6	Vincent R. Biskupic	Vincent R. Biskupic	20,313	100.0%				
Ozaukee	1	Paul V. Malloy	Paul V. Malloy	13,513	98.82%				
Ozaukee	3	Sandy A. Williams	Sandy A. Williams	13,434	98.74%				
Racine	6	David W. Paulson	David W. Paulson	16,757	98.56%				
Racine	8	Faye M. Flancher	Faye M. Flancher	16,877	98.57%				
Rock	5	Mike Haakenson	Mike Haakenson	14,416	99.17%				
Sawyer		John M. Yackel	John M. Yackel	2,304	98.00%				
Sheboygan	1	L. Edward Stengel	Samantha Bastil	14,162	99.18%				
Sheboygan	4	Rebecca Persick	Rebecca Persick	14,283	99.29%				
Taylor		Ann N. Knox-Bauer	Ann N. Knox-Bauer	4,397	99.71%				
Walworth	3	Kristine E. Drettwan	Kristine E. Drettwan	12,238	98.59%				
Washington	4	Sandra J. Giernoth	Sandra J. Giernoth	16,283	100.0%				
Waukesha	7	Maria S. Lazar	Maria S. Lazar	48,711	98.99%				
Waukesha	8	Michael P. Maxwell	Michael P. Maxwell	48,406	99.04%				
Waukesha	9	Michael J. Aprahamian	Michael J. Aprahamian	48,795	99.06%				
Waukesha	10	Paul Bugenhagen Jr.	Paul Bugenhagen Jr.	48,458	99.05%				
Wood	3	Todd P. Wolf	Todd P. Wolf	8,958	99.37%				

== Local elections ==
=== Dane County ===
==== Dane County executive ====
- Incumbent Joe Parisi was re-elected to a third full term as County Executive, he defeated challenger Mary Ann Nicholson with 79% of the vote.

=== Sheboygan County ===
==== Sheboygan mayor ====
- A regularly scheduled mayoral election was held in Sheboygan, Wisconsin, at the Spring general election, April 6, 2021. City council president Ryan Sorenson was elected mayor, defeating the incumbent mayor Mike Vandersteen. Sorenson, at age 27, became the youngest mayor in the city's history.

==== Sheboygan Area School Board ====
- Three members of the Sheboygan Area School District's board were also elected.

=== Waupaca County ===
==== Clintonville School Board ====
- Three seats were up for election on the Clintonville School Board. Eight candidates entered the primary, which narrowed the field to six. The six candidates advancing are Larry Czarnecki, Chadwick J. Dobbe, Glen Lundt, Laurie A. Vollrath, Jason L. Moder, and Ben Huber.

==== Manawa mayor ====
- Manawa's primary narrowed the field of mayoral candidates from 3 to two, with Mark Zelmer and Michael Frazier advancing.
