= Junkermann =

Junkermann is a German surname. Notable people with the surname include:

- Hans Junkermann (cyclist) (1934–2022), German cyclist
- Ilse Junkermann (born 1957), German Lutheran bishop
- Otto Junkermann (1929–2016), American politician
