= Jill Underly =

American educator (born 1977)

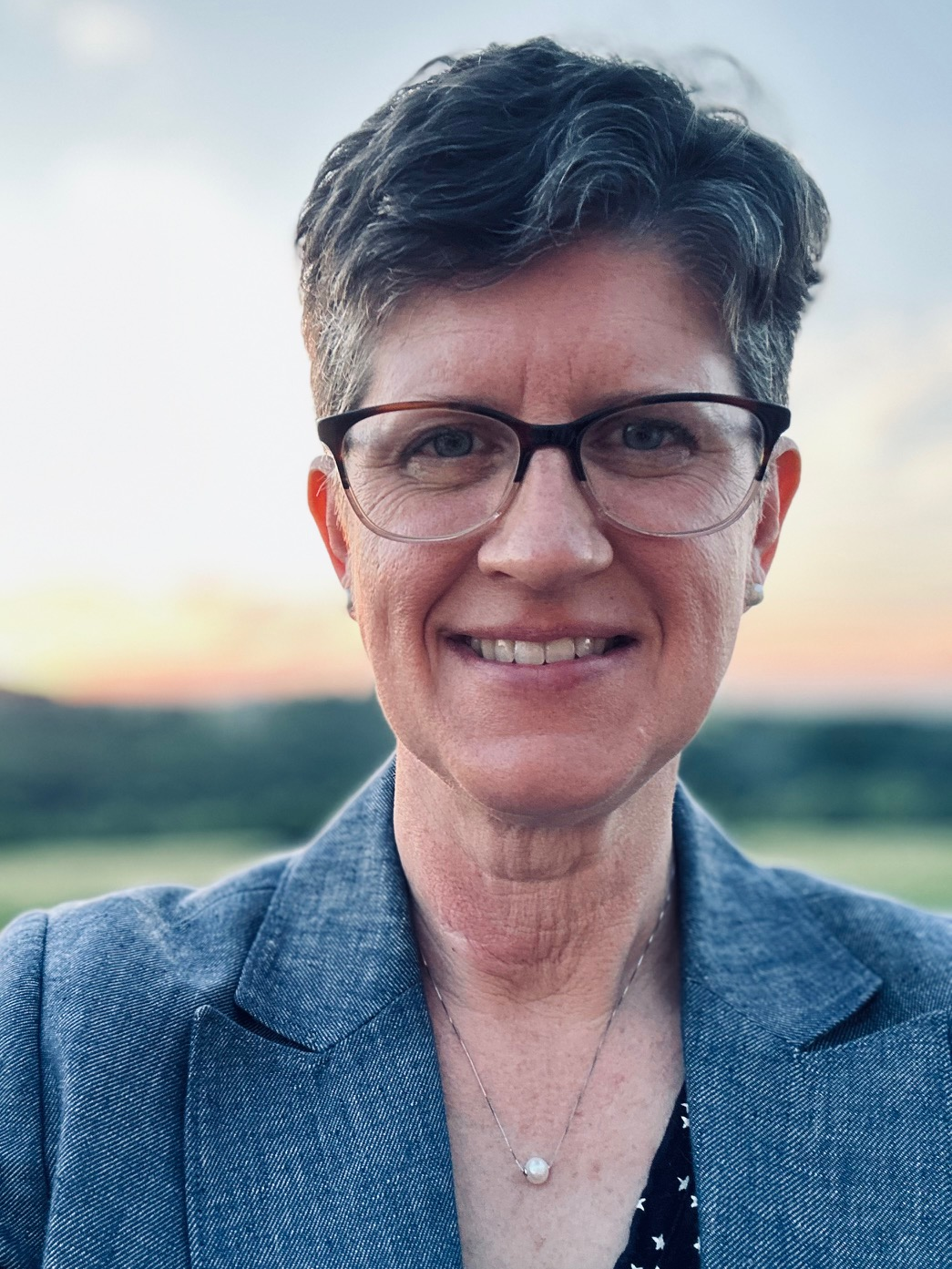
- Underly in 2025

28th Superintendent of Public Instruction of Wisconsin
- Incumbent
- Assumed office July 5, 2021
- Governor: Tony Evers
- Preceded by: Carolyn Stanford Taylor

Personal details
- Born: August 2, 1977 (age 49) Hammond, Indiana, U.S.
- Party: Democratic
- Spouse: John Underly (m. 2002)
- Children: 2
- Education: Indiana University Bloomington (BA); Indiana University Indianapolis (MA); University of Wisconsin, Madison (MS, PhD)
- Website: Campaign website

Jill Katherine Underly (born August 2, 1977) is an American educator and school system administrator from Iowa County, Wisconsin. She is the superintendent of public instruction of the U.S. state of Wisconsin, elected in the 2021 general election. She previously served as an assistant director in the Wisconsin Department of Public Instruction, and as superintendent of the Pecatonica Area School District.

== Early life and career ==
Born Jill Semko, Underly grew up in northwest Indiana, outside Chicago. She attended the School Town of Munster public schools, graduating from Munster High School in 1995. She earned her bachelor's degree from Indiana University Bloomington in 1999, with a double major in history and sociology.

She began her career as a high school social studies teacher at Frankfort High School and Munster High School, located in Frankfort and Munster, Indiana, respectively. While teaching, she pursued further education, and, in 2004, received her first master's degree in secondary education curriculum and instruction from Indiana University–Purdue University Indianapolis.

In 2005, Underly left Indiana and moved to Madison, Wisconsin, where she continued her education at the University of Wisconsin–Madison and worked on the staff for Undergraduate Academic Services in the College of Letters & Sciences. In 2008, she earned her second master's degree and licensure in educational administration. In 2009, she was hired by the Wisconsin Department of Public Instruction as an assistant director of the educator licensing team and federal programs education consultant, a position she held until 2014. During these years, she continued her education at the University of Wisconsin, and, in 2012, earned her doctorate in educational leadership and policy analysis.

In 2014, Underly moved to Hollandale, Wisconsin, to become principal of Pecatonica Elementary School. The following year, the Pecatonica Area School Board selected her as school district administrator. During her term, Underly was outspoken for the interests of rural school districts.

== Superintendent of Public Instruction ==
In May 2020, following the announcement that incumbent State Superintendent Carolyn Stanford Taylor would not seek election to a full four-year term, Underly announced her candidacy for state superintendent of Public Instruction.

Underly topped a field of seven candidates in the February 2021 nonpartisan primary, and went on to defeat former Brown Deer Superintendent Deborah Kerr in the April general election. Underly received the endorsements of retired Republican state senator Dale Schultz; Democratic U.S. senator Tammy Baldwin; U.S. representatives Ron Kind, Gwen Moore, and Mark Pocan, former Governor Jim Doyle; and nearly every Democrat in the Wisconsin Legislature. Her opponent, a proponent of voucher school expansion, was endorsed by former U.S. Secretary of Education Arne Duncan and Democratic state senator Lena Taylor.

On April 1, 2025, Underly was re-elected to another term as state superintendent after successfully defeating education consultant Brittany Kinser.

== Role on the University of Wisconsin System Board of Regents ==
Underly serves as the only elected member of the University of Wisconsin System Board of Regents. Her position is ex-officio, as the office holder for the elected state superintendent is in this role. In 2022, she served on the Regent Special Committee that ultimately named Dr. Corey A. King as the University of Wisconsin–Whitewater's Chancellor in January 2023.

In August 2024, Underly was the sole regent to vote against a proposal leading to significant faculty layoffs across the UW System. Her dissent highlighted concerns about the lack of consultation with labor unions and the potential long-term impact on faculty and staff. She emphasized the importance of shared governance and the need for more inclusive decision-making processes.

Underly was a strong proponent of the Direct Admit Wisconsin program, which offers automatic admission to qualifying high school students at participating University of Wisconsin institutions. This initiative aims to increase access to higher education for Wisconsin residents by removing traditional application barriers. Under her support and the direction of the agency she oversees, the program expanded significantly with over 150 new high schools joining in its second year, providing admission offers to nearly 34,000 students. Under her leadership, the DPI, was instrumental in connecting public high school student data to the University of Wisconsin System, so they could make these admissions decisions.

== Awards and recognition ==
During Underly's tenure as state superintendent, Wisconsin's high school graduation rate reached a record 91.1% in the 2023–24 school year, the highest in the state's history. At the same time, student attendance improved after the COVID-19 pandemic. Chronic absenteeism declined to 17.7% while overall attendance rose to 92.4%, reflecting one of the strongest recoveries in the Midwest.

In 2023, under Underly, the Wisconsin legislature passed Act 20, a bipartisan law ushering in statewide "science of reading" reforms. The law mandated a shift away from the promoted “three-cueing” method of early literacy instruction, which encourages students to guess words using semantic, syntactic, and visual cues—often at the expense of phonetic decoding. Act 20 required schools to adopt phonics-based reading practices and outlawed reliance on three-cueing for kindergarten through third-grade instruction. Underly, as state superintendent, played a central role in negotiating the legislation and advocating for the new reading approach. She credited the initiative as one of her proudest accomplishments of her first term.

Act 20 also allocated $50 million for implementation—intended to support the creation of an Office of Literacy, hiring early reading coaches, developing curricula, and providing professional development for educators. The statute established an early literacy coaching program, screening assessments, and early intervention requirements, while increasing oversight of teacher preparation programs to ensure alignment with evidence-based instruction principles.

In 2024, Underly led a recalibration of the Forward Exam's cut scores and terminology—moving away from National Assessment of Educational Progress (NAEP)-based standards and involving about 100 Wisconsin educators in the process to ensure alignment with current academic standards. Underly directed the DPI to update the Forward Exam's proficiency categories—changing terminology and adjusting cut scores to align better with state academic standards. This marked a departure from the prior alignment with NAEP-based benchmarks.

Governor Tony Evers vetoed legislation intended to reverse the changes, citing the importance of maintaining the superintendent's authority in setting standards. Independent groups, such as the Wisconsin Institute for Law and Liberty and the Badger Institute, criticized the shift, arguing that the revised standards reduced accountability and hindered meaningful comparisons over time. Critics also raised concerns about diminished year-over-year and interstate comparability due to the new reporting system.

The Wisconsin Department of Public Instruction (DPI) has released estimated trend data files to help compare student performance using the new standards and cut scores for the Forward Exam. This data, available through the WISEdash Public Portal, enables users to analyze how students would have performed in previous years if the new 2024 performance standards for English Language Arts (ELA) and mathematics had been in place.

- Anthony J. Gradisnik Foreign Language Advocacy Award (2022) - awarded to the Wisconsin Department of Public Instruction, under the leadership of Underly, by the Wisconsin Association for Language Teachers (WAFLT), in recognition of outstanding advocacy for language education
- State Council on Affirmative Action's Diversity Award (2024) - The Wisconsin Department of Public Instruction, under the leadership of Dr. Underly, received the 2024 Diversity Award from the State Council on Affirmative Action. The award honors state agencies for their commitment to recruiting, retaining, and promoting a diverse workforce, as evidenced by strategic, inclusive initiatives. Underly accepted the award on behalf of DPI in December 2024, recognizing the department's development and implementation of its 2024-26 Equity and Inclusion Strategic Plan—which outlined specific goals for diversifying and retaining underrepresented staff, improving hiring practices, and fostering an inclusive workplace culture.
- Distinguished Alumni Award, Indiana University College of Arts & Sciences (2025)

== Personal life and family ==
Underly and her husband John live in Hollandale, Wisconsin; they have two children.

== Electoral history ==
2021 Wisconsin Superintendent of Public Instruction election
Party	Candidate	Votes	%
Nonpartisan primary, February 16, 2021
Nonpartisan	Jill Underly	88,796	27.23%
Nonpartisan	Deborah Kerr	86,174	26.43%
Nonpartisan	Sheila Briggs	50,815	15.58%
Nonpartisan	Shandowlyon Hendricks-Williams	36,850	11.30%
Nonpartisan	Troy Gunderson	27,452	8.42%
Nonpartisan	Steve Krull	20,543	6.30%
Nonpartisan	Joe Fenrick	14,507	4.45%
Nonpartisan	Scattering	937	0.29%
Total votes		326,074	100.0%
General election, April 6, 2021
Nonpartisan	Jill Underly	526,444	57.57%
Nonpartisan	Deborah Kerr	386,570	42.27%
Nonpartisan	Scattering	1,420	0.16%
Plurality		139,874	15.30%
Total votes		914,434	100.0%

2025 Wisconsin Superintendent of Public Instruction election
Party	Candidate	Votes	%
Nonpartisan primary, February 18, 2025
Nonpartisan	Jill Underly (incumbent)	177,626	37.90%
Nonpartisan	Brittany Kinser	161,636	34.49%
Nonpartisan	Jeff Wright	128,292	27.38%
Nonpartisan	Scattering	1,055	0.23%
Total votes		468,609	100.0%
General election, April 1, 2025
Nonpartisan	Jill Underly (incumbent)	1,148,427	52.71%
Nonpartisan	Brittany Kinser	1,022,489	46.93%
Nonpartisan	Adrianne Melby (write-in)	348	0.02%
Nonpartisan	Scattering	7,305	0.34%
Plurality		125,938	5.78%
Total votes		2,178,569	100.0%

Political offices
Preceded by Carolyn Stanford Taylor	Superintendent of Public Instruction of Wisconsin; 2021–present	Incumbent
