= 2021 Wisconsin Superintendent of Public Instruction election =

- April 6, 2021
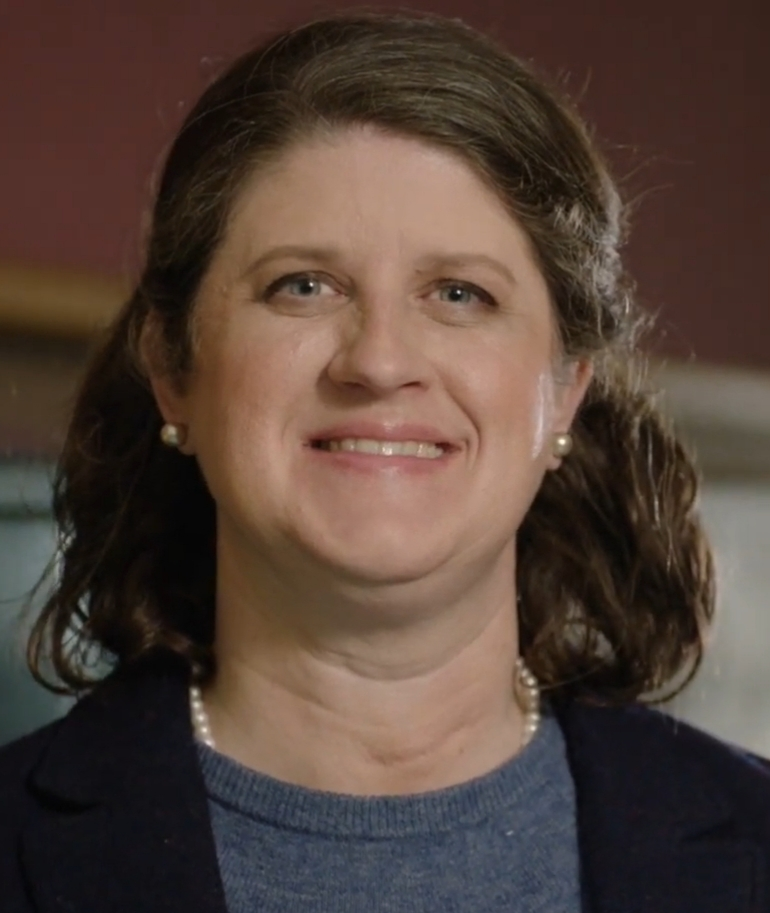

Nominee	Jill Underly	Deborah Kerr
Popular vote	526,444	386,570
Percentage	57.57%	42.27%
- County results Underly: 50–60% 60–70% 70–80% 80–90% Kerr: 50–60% 60–70%
Superintendent before election
Carolyn Stanford Taylor
Nonpartisan
Elected Superintendent
Jill Underly
Nonpartisan

The 2021 Wisconsin Superintendent of Public Instruction election was a nonpartisan state-wide election held on April 6, 2021, to elect the Superintendent of Public Instruction of Wisconsin for a four-year term. The election was won by Jill Underly, the superintendent of the Pecatonica Area School District, defeating former Brown Deer School District superintendent Deborah Kerr.

The incumbent superintendent, Carolyn Stanford Taylor, did not run for election to a full term; she had been appointed to the office in 2019 by governor Tony Evers. Evers had been the previously-elected superintendent, but resigned on January 7, 2019, after he was elected governor of Wisconsin.

Underly and Kerr advanced to the general election as the top two vote-getters in the February 16, 2021, nonpartisan primary, receiving 27% and 26% of the votes, respectively. Five other candidates were eliminated in the primary.

== Background ==
=== School choice ===
In Wisconsin, school choice stretches back to the administrations of governor Tommy Thompson and Milwaukee mayor John Norquist when they implemented a school vouchers program in Milwaukee in the 1990s—The Milwaukee Parental Choice Program (MPCP). Originally the program had been open to pupils with a family income less than 175% of the federal poverty line, while only secular private schools were eligible for the program.

In 2011, several changes occurred to the school choice programs in the state. Republican governor Scott Walker signed a budget which eliminated the previous enrollment cap for the MPCP, while the range of eligible incomes was expanded. Subsequently, the Republican controlled legislature passed the Wisconsin Parental Choice Program, which expanded school choice programs across the state.

By fall 2020, students enrolled in private schools in Wisconsin numbered around 118,862. This represented a 1.53% decrease from the previous year.

== Primary election ==
=== Candidates ===
==== Advanced ====
- Deborah Kerr, former superintendent of Brown Deer School District
- Jill Underly, superintendent of Pecatonica Area School District

==== Eliminated in primary ====
- Sheila Briggs, assistant state superintendent at the state Department of Public Instruction
- Joe Fenrick, Fond du Lac high school science teacher
- Troy Gunderson, Viterbo University professor and former superintendent of the School District of West Salem
- Shandowlyon Hendricks-Williams, former director of Evers' Milwaukee office and DPI Education Administrative Director of Teacher Education, Professional Development and Licensing
- Steve Krull, principal of Milwaukee's Garland Elementary School and former Air Force instructor

==== Declined ====
- Carolyn Stanford Taylor, incumbent Superintendent of Public Instruction

=== Primary results ===
Primary county results Underly: Underly—20–30%; Underly—30–40%; Underly—40–50%; Underly—50–60%; Kerr: Kerr—20–30%; Kerr—30–40%; Kerr—40–50%; Gunderson: Gunderson—20–30%; Gunderson—30–40%; Gunderson—40–50%

2021 Wisconsin Superintendent of Public Instruction primary election
Party	Candidate	Votes	%
Nonpartisan	Jill Underly	88,796	27.23%
Nonpartisan	Deborah Kerr	86,174	26.43%
Nonpartisan	Sheila Briggs	50,815	15.58%
Nonpartisan	Shandowlyon Hendricks-Williams	36,850	11.30%
Nonpartisan	Troy Gunderson	27,452	8.42%
Nonpartisan	Steve Krull	20,543	6.30%
Nonpartisan	Joe Fenrick	14,507	4.45%
Write-in		937	0.29%
Total votes		326,074	100.0%

== General election ==
=== Results ===
2021 Wisconsin Superintendent of Public Instruction election
Party	Candidate	Votes	%
General Election, April 6, 2021
Nonpartisan	Jill Underly	526,444	57.57%
Nonpartisan	Deborah Kerr	386,570	42.27%
Write-in		1,420	0.16%
Total votes		914,434	100.0%
