= Deborah Kerr (disambiguation) =

Deborah Kerr (1921–2007) was a Scottish film and television actress.

Deborah Kerr may also refer to:

- Deborah Kerr (Wisconsin politician), a candidate in the 2021 election for Wisconsin Superintendent of Public Instruction
- Deborah Kerr (canoeist) (born 1997), Scottish canoeist
