= Pecatonica School District =

Pecatonica School District may refer to:

- Pecatonica Community Unit School District 321 (Illinois)
- Pecatonica Area School District (Wisconsin)
