= Daniel Steele Durrie =

American librarian (1819–1892)

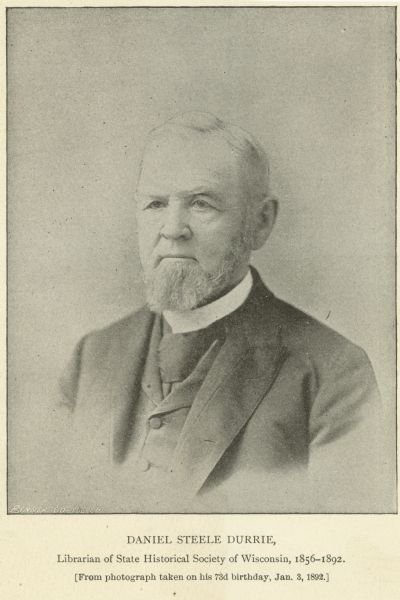
- Born: January 2, 1819
- Died: August 31, 1892 (aged 73)
- Occupation: Librarian

Daniel Steele Durrie (January 2, 1819 – August 31, 1892) was librarian of the State Historical Society of Wisconsin from 1856 to 1892.

Durrie was born at Albany, N.Y., January 2, 1819. He was a son of Horace Durrie, a native of Hartford, Conn., and a grandson of John Durrie, of Stony Stratford, Buckinghamshire, England, who came to America in 1781; his mother was Johannah Steele, daughter of Daniel Steele, a bookseller and stationer of Albany, to which place his father removed about 1817; from both parents he is descended from John Steele, the first Secretary of the Colony of Connecticut, and William Bradford, Governor of Plymouth Colony.

Durrie was educated at the Albany Academy, and at a select school at South Hadley, Massachusetts, after which he entered the store of his uncle and learned the bookselling business, and succeeded him in the same, in 1844; in 1848 he lost his property in the great fire which occurred that year, at Albany, and in 1850 he removed to Madison, Wisconsin and he was engaged in the same occupation from 1854 to 1857, when he withdrew from mercantile business, and in 1858 he accepted a position in the office of Hon. Lyman C. Draper, State Superintendent of Public Instruction, which he held for two years; he was elected a member of the State Historical Society in 1854; was elected a member of the Executive Committee in 1855, and Librarian in 1856; the society at that time was in its infancy, with a library of only a few volumes.

Durrie published his first work, A Genealogical History of John and George Steele, Settlers of Hartford, Conn., 1635-36, and their Descendants, in 1859, and an enlarged edition of 161 pages in 1862; in 1864 he published A Genealogical History of the HOLT Family in the United States, more particularly the Descendants of Nicholas HOLT, of Andover, Mass., 1634, and of William HOLT, of New Haven, Conn., 1644; in 1868 he published his Bibliographia Genealogical Americana; an Alphabetical Index to Pedigrees and Genealogies Contained in the State, County and Town Histories, Printed Genealogies and Kindred Works, a volume of 300 pages; this work was subsequently revised and enlarged, and published in 1878; in 1869 he prepared and published in the Historical Magazine a "Bibliography of the State of Wisconsin," giving the title and reference to all publications that have been issued on the State; in 1872 he prepared two historical papers on "The Early Outposts of Wisconsin," "Green Bay, for Two Hundred Years, 1639 to 1839," and "Annals of Prairie du Chien," which appeared in pamphlet form, and also an article on Capt. Jonathan Carver, an early traveler in Wisconsin, in Volume VI of the collections of the Historical Society; in 1874 he published a History of Madison and the Four Lake Country of Wisconsin, with notices of Dane County and its Towns, a volume of 420 pages; in 1861 and 1862 he collected materials for the publication of a Gazetteer of the State of Wisconsin; the work was completed, but owing to the American Civil War, the publication was suspended; in the year 1875, he assisted C. R. Tuttle in the preparation of his histories of Wisconsin and Iowa; in 1876 he prepared an historical address for the twenty-fifth anniversary of the organization of the Presbyterian Church at Madison, which was published that year in pamphlet form; and in the same year he was associated with W. B. Davis, in writing a history of Missouri, which was published at St. Louis; in 1877, he prepared a paper on the "Public Domain of Wisconsin" for Snyder & Van Vechten's Historical Atlas of Wisconsin. Durrie was a member of the Connecticut, New Hampshire, Rhode Island, Pennsylvania, Minnesota, Buffalo, Chicago and Western Reserve Historical Societies; of the New England Historical and Genealogical Society, and Genealogical and Biographical Society of New York; the Pilgrim Society and the Philadelphia Numismatic and Antiquarian Society.

He married at Albany, N.Y., Oct. 15, 1844, Anna, daughter of David and Elizabeth (Hempstead) Holt, and had a family of six children.

This article incorporates text from History of Dane County, Wisconsin, a publication from 1880, now in the public domain in the United States.
