= Gary Tauchen =

American dairy farmer and Republican politician

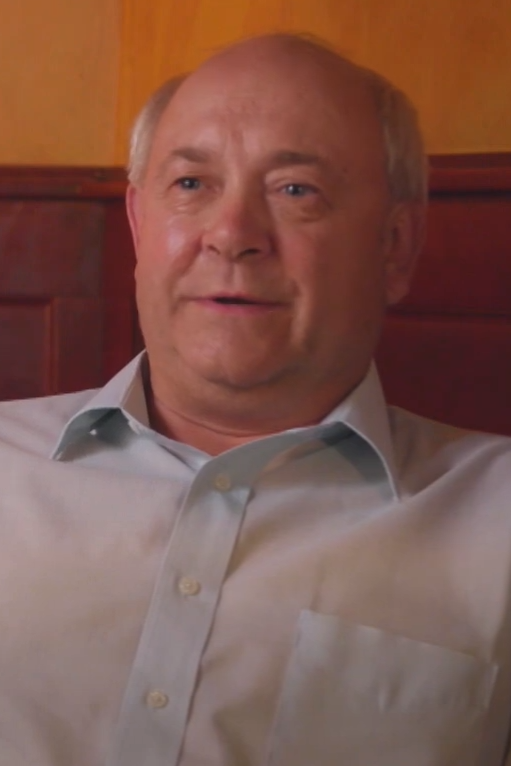
- Tauchen in 2022

Member of the Wisconsin State Assembly from the 6th district
- In office January 1, 2007 – January 2, 2023
- Preceded by: John Ainsworth
- Succeeded by: Peter Schmidt

Personal details
- Born: November 23, 1953 (age 72) Rice Lake, Wisconsin
- Party: Republican
- Spouse: None
- Education: University of Wisconsin–River Falls (B.S.)
- Profession: dairy farmer

Gary Tauchen (born November 23, 1953) is an American dairy farmer and Republican politician. He was a member of the Wisconsin State Assembly, representing the 6th Assembly district from 2007 through 2022. The 6th district comprised most of Shawano County along with northwestern Outagamie County and neighboring towns in eastern Waupaca County.

== Early life and career ==
Born in Rice Lake, Wisconsin, Tauchen graduated from Bonduel High School in 1971. He briefly attended the University of Wisconsin–Madison and received his bachelor's degree in animal science from the University of Wisconsin–River Falls. In 1976, in partnership with his father, Herb, and brother, Alan, Tauchen started Tauchen's Harmony Valley Farm, which he still co-owns and operates with his parents and his two surviving brothers. Today, the farm has around 1200 milking cows and raises crops on nearly 2500 acres. Through his farm business, Tauchen became involved in a number of farm and conservation councils in Wisconsin. He was chairman of the Shawano Farm Bureau and the Wisconsin Dairy Herd Improvement Cooperative, and chaired Governor Tommy Thompson's Dairy 20/20 Council.

== Political career ==
In April 2006, State Representative John Ainsworth announced he would not seek reelection to another term. A few weeks later, in an event at his family farm, Tauchen announced he would be a candidate for Wisconsin State Assembly in the seat vacated by Ainsworth. Ultimately, four other candidates also joined the Republican primary in the heavily Republican district, though one candidate, Paul Mogged, would drop out before the primary to endorse Tauchen. Tauchen was also endorsed by the Wisconsin Farm Bureau—a lobbying organization for farming interests. Tauchen prevailed in the primary, receiving a majority of the votes in the four-way contest. In the general election, Tauchen defeated Democrat Richard Lieffring, a teacher from Cecil, Wisconsin, taking 60% of the vote. Tauchen has subsequently been reelected seven times.

Tauchen currently serves as chairman of the Assembly Committee on Agriculture and also serves on the Assembly committees on Energy and Utilities, on State Affairs, and on Tourism.

On January 21, 2021, he announced that he would not seek re-election.

== Electoral history ==
=== Wisconsin Assembly (2006–2020) ===
Year	Election	Date	Elected				Defeated				Total	Plurality
2006	Primary	September 12	Gary Tauchen	Republican	3,534	50.76%	Scott D. McMahon	Rep.	1,631	23.43%	6,962	1,903
2006	Primary	September 12	Gary Tauchen	Republican	3,534	50.76%	Dale R. Vannes	Rep.	1,073	15.41%	6,962	1,903
2006	Primary	September 12	Gary Tauchen	Republican	3,534	50.76%	J. P. Drengler	Rep.	716	10.28%	6,962	1,903
2006	General	November 7	Gary Tauchen	Republican	12,199	60.33%	Charles J. Boyle	Dem.	8,015	39.64%	20,221	4,184
2008	General	November 4	Gary Tauchen (inc.)	Republican	14,237	55.02%	John Powers	Dem.	11,631	44.95%	25,874	2,606
2010	General	November 2	Gary Tauchen (inc.)	Republican	15,599	99.45%					15,686	15,512
2012	General	November 6	Gary Tauchen (inc.)	Republican	15,423	59.41%	John Powers	Dem.	10,508	40.48%	25,961	4,915
2012	General	November 6	Gary Tauchen (inc.)	Republican	15,423	59.41%	Jon Kupsky (write-in)	Ind.	9	0.03%	25,961	4,915
2014	General	November 4	Gary Tauchen (inc.)	Republican	18,696	99.32%					18,824	18,568
2016	General	November 8	Gary Tauchen (inc.)	Republican	18,690	70.15%	William J. Switalla	Dem.	7,944	29.82%	26,642	10,746
2018	General	November 6	Gary Tauchen (inc.)	Republican	15,028	61.60%	Richard Sarnwick	Dem.	7,693	31.53%	24,398	7,335
2018	General	November 6	Gary Tauchen (inc.)	Republican	15,028	61.60%	Mike Hammond	Lib.	1,675	6.87%	24,398	7,335
2020	General	November 3	Gary Tauchen (inc.)	Republican	21,283	69.40%	Richard Sarnwick	Dem.	9,378	30.58%	30,666	11,905

Wisconsin State Assembly
Preceded by John Ainsworth	Member of the Wisconsin State Assembly from the 6th district January 1, 2007 – January 2, 2023	Succeeded by Peter Schmidt
