= Wisconsin's 89th Assembly district =

American legislative district in Brown County, Wisconsin

Wisconsin's 89th State Assembly district
- 2024 map defined in 2023 Wisc. Act 94; 2022 map defined in Johnson v. Wisconsin Elections Commission; 2011 map was defined in 2011 Wisc. Act 43
Assemblymember
Ryan Spaude; D–Ashwaubenon
since January 6, 2025 (1 years)
- Demographics: 79.31% White; 4.51% Black; 6.45% Hispanic; 3.83% Asian; 6.25% Native American; 0.13% Hawaiian/Pacific Islander
- Population (2020) • Voting age: 59,697; 46,453
- Website: Official website
- Notes: Green Bay metro area

The 89th Assembly district of Wisconsin is one of 99 districts in the Wisconsin State Assembly. Located in Northeastern Wisconsin, the district is entirely contained within central Brown County. It includes the village of Ashwaubenon and much of the west side of the city of Green Bay. The district contains Lambeau Field, home of the Green Bay Packers. The district is represented by Democrat Ryan Spaude, since January 2025.

The 89th Assembly district is located within Wisconsin's 30th Senate district, along with the 88th and 90th Assembly districts.

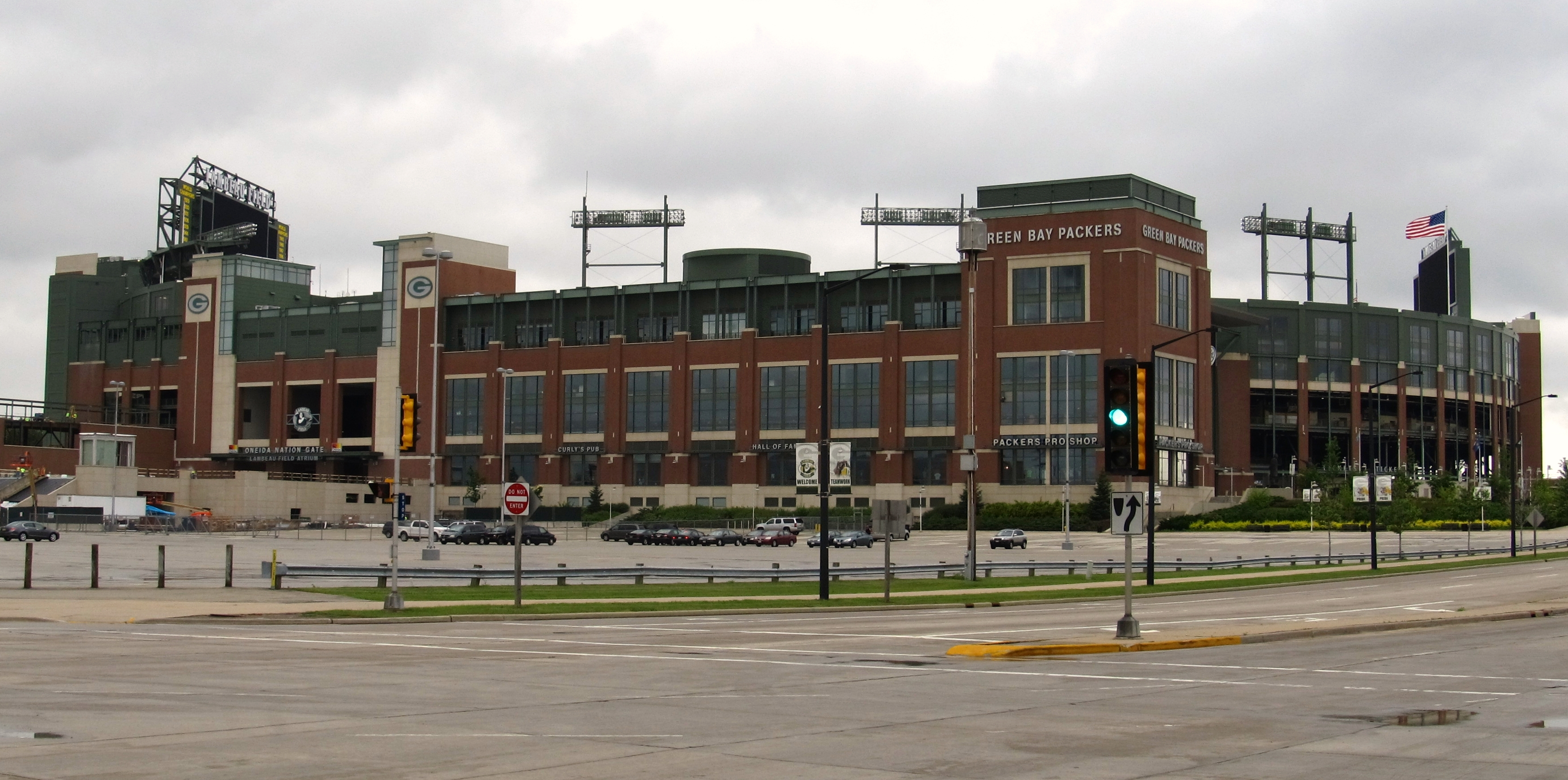
Lambeau Field

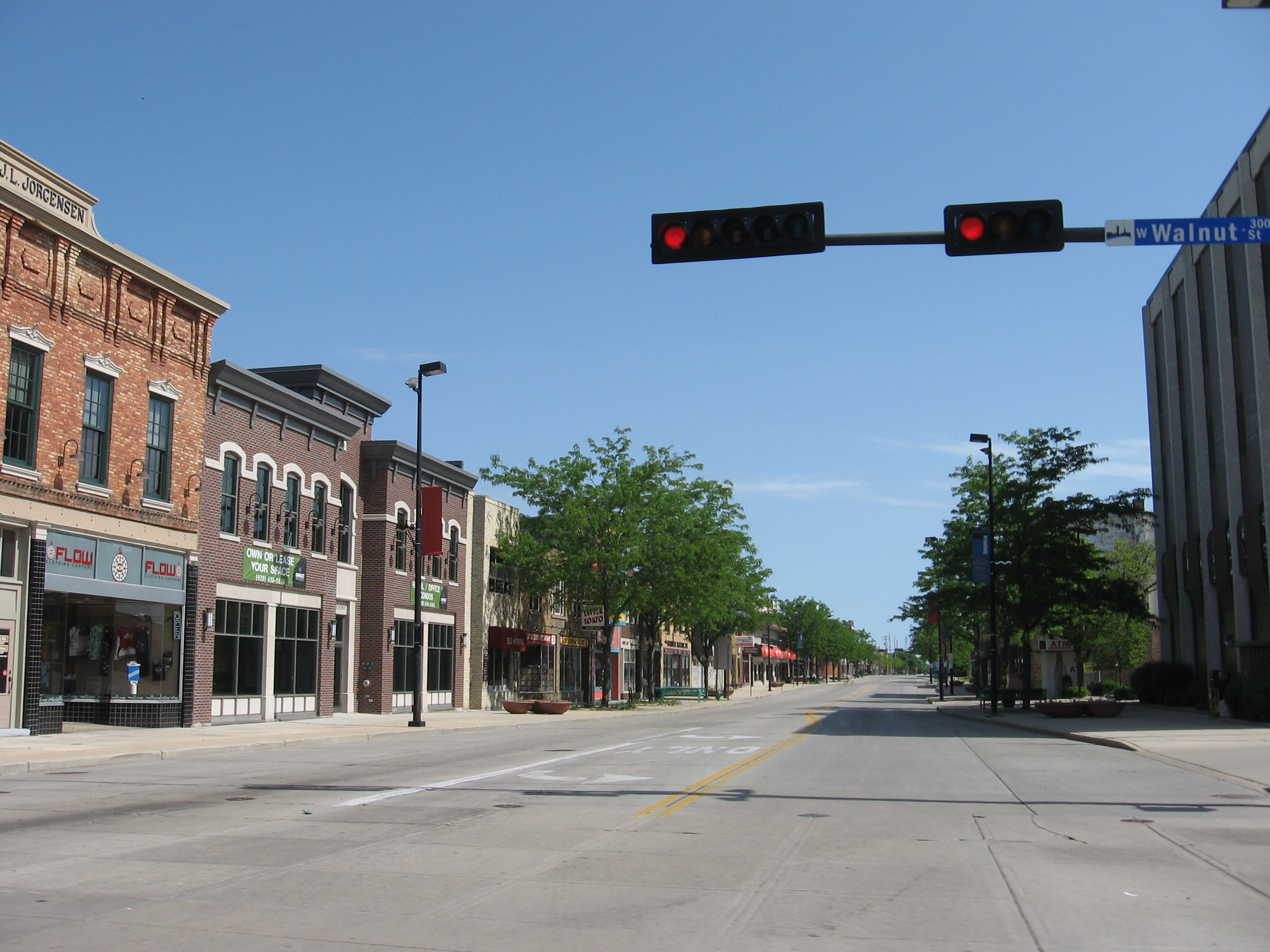
Green Bay's Broadway District

== History ==
The district was created in the 1972 redistricting act (1971 Wisc. Act 304) which first established the numbered district system, replacing the previous system which allocated districts to specific counties. The 89th district was drawn mostly in line with the boundaries of the previous Brown 3rd district, which comprised roughly the northwest corner of Brown County, including coastal areas of the city of Green Bay. The last representative of the Brown 3rd district, Cletus J. Vanderperren, was elected in 1972 as the first representative of the 89th Assembly district.

The 1982 court-ordered redistricting plan briefly moved the district into central Fond du Lac County, including the city of Fond du Lac. The 1983 redistricting act brought the district back to its previous location with nearly identical boundaries to the 1972 map. The 1992 court-ordered redistricting plan dramatically changed the boundaries, removing the city of Green Bay and most of the Green Bay suburbs, and instead stretching north into eastern Oconto and eastern Marinette counties, taking over territory previously assigned to the 88th district. The 2002 redistricting kept those boundaries largely intact. The 2011 redistricting (2011 Wisc. Act 43) also roughly maintained the geography of the district, but added back areas of eastern Howard, as part of a broader scheme to pack Democratic votes into the 90th district. The 2022 court ordered plan mostly maintained that district.

The 2024 redistricting (2023 Wisc. Act 94) dramatically reorganized the 30th Senate district, moving the 89th district back into the core of the Green Bay metro area, comprising much of the west side of the city of Green Bay and the neighboring village of Ashwaubenon. Under the new map configuration, the 89th Assembly district is projected to be one of the most competitive districts in the state legislature.

== List of past representatives ==
List of representatives to the Wisconsin State Assembly from the 89th district
Member	Party	Residence	Counties represented	Term start	Term end	Ref.
District created
Cletus J. Vanderperren	Dem.	Pittsfield	Brown	January 1, 1973	January 3, 1983	
Earl F. McEssy	Rep.	Fond du Lac	Fond du Lac	January 3, 1983	January 7, 1985	
Cletus J. Vanderperren	Dem.	Green Bay	Brown	January 7, 1985	January 4, 1993	
John Gard	Rep.	Suamico	Brown, Marinette, Oconto	January 4, 1993	January 1, 2007	
John Nygren	Rep.	Marinette	Brown, Marinette, Oconto	January 1, 2007	December 2, 2020	
--Vacant--			Brown, Marinette, Oconto	December 2, 2020	May 11, 2021	
Elijah Behnke	Rep.	Pensaukee	Brown, Marinette, Oconto	May 11, 2021	January 6, 2025	
Ryan Spaude	Dem.	Ashwaubenon	Brown	January 6, 2025	Current	

== Electoral history ==
Year	Date	Elected				Defeated				Total	Plurality	Other primary candidates
1972	Nov. 7	Cletus J. Vanderperren	Democratic	11,442	70.23%	Henry A. Rueden	Rep.	4,851	29.77%	16,293	6,591	
1974	Nov. 5	Cletus J. Vanderperren (inc)	Democratic	8,910	100.00%					8,910	8,910	
1976	Nov. 2	Cletus J. Vanderperren (inc)	Democratic	12,657	68.71%	John R. Hansen	Rep.	5,628	31.29%	17,984	6,728	
1978	Nov. 7	Cletus J. Vanderperren (inc)	Democratic	8,826	64.57%	William H. Dierks	Rep.	4,842	35.43%	13,668	3,984	
1980	Nov. 4	Cletus J. Vanderperren (inc)	Democratic	12,685	59.04%	Robert A. Thompson	Rep.	8,799	40.96%	21,484	3,886	Wendell W. McLester (Dem.)
1982	Nov. 2	Earl F. McEssy	Republican	10,394	56.58%	Rosalie Tryon	Dem.	7,975	43.42%	18,369	2,419	
1984	Nov. 6	Cletus J. Vanderperren	Democratic	13,318	65.29%	James D. Shatswell	Rep.	7,079	34.71%	20,397	6,239	
1986	Nov. 4	Cletus J. Vanderperren (inc)	Democratic	10,721	68.73%	James D. Shatswell	Rep.	4,878	31.27%	15,599	5,843	
1988	Nov. 8	Cletus J. Vanderperren (inc)	Democratic	15,089	68.04%	James D. Shatswell	Rep.	7,089	31.96%	22,178	8,000	Raymond C. Maxwell (Rep.)
1990	Nov. 6	Cletus J. Vanderperren (inc)	Democratic	9,604	58.71%	Gary F. Drzewiecki	Rep.	6,755	41.29%	16,359	2,849	Raymond C. Maxwell (Rep.); Serena E. Mommaerts (Rep.)
1992	Nov. 3	John Gard	Republican	14,826	64.02%	Scott McCormick	Dem.	8,331	35.98%	23,157	6,495	
1994	Nov. 8	John Gard (inc)	Republican	10,325	68.53%	Kim Fenske	Dem.	4,742	31.47%	15,067	5,583	
1996	Nov. 5	John Gard (inc)	Republican	14,113	66.67%	Kim Fenske	Dem.	7,056	33.33%	21,169	7,057	
1998	Nov. 3	John Gard (inc)	Republican	13,088	97.96%	Alan S. Hager (write-in)	Dem.	272	2.04%	13,360	12,816	
2000	Nov. 7	John Gard (inc)	Republican	18,372	72.65%	Alan S. Hager	Dem.	6,904	27.30%	25,290	11,468	
2002	Nov. 5	John Gard (inc)	Republican	11,335	69.06%	Alan S. Hager	Dem.	4,501	27.42%	16,414	6,834	
2002	Nov. 5	John Gard (inc)	Republican	11,335	69.06%	Justin Ingalls	Lib.	308	1.88%	16,414	6,834	
2002	Nov. 5	John Gard (inc)	Republican	11,335	69.06%	Jake Neta	Ind.	257	1.57%	16,414	6,834	
2004	Nov. 2	John Gard (inc)	Republican	18,216	63.81%	Bruce J. Berman	Dem.	10,318	36.15%	28,546	7,898	Don Peterlin (Dem.)
2006	Nov. 7	John Nygren	Republican	11,844	54.10%	Randy Koehn	Dem.	10,011	45.73%	21,891	1,833	Gary F. Drzewiecki (Rep.); Bruce J. Berman (Dem.)
2008	Nov. 4	John Nygren (inc)	Republican	14,814	53.54%	Randy Koehn	Dem.	12,839	46.40%	27,668	1,975	
2010	Nov. 2	John Nygren (inc)	Republican	15,788	67.68%	Bob Orwig	Dem.	7,520	32.24%	23,326	8,268	
2012	Nov. 6	John Nygren (inc)	Republican	16,081	59.05%	Joe Reinhard	Dem.	11,129	40.87%	27,232	4,952	
2014	Nov. 4	John Nygren (inc)	Republican	18,483	99.38%					18,599	18,367	
2016	Nov. 8	John Nygren (inc)	Republican	19,429	68.20%	Heidi Fencl	Dem.	9,055	31.78%	28,489	10,374	
2018	Nov. 6	John Nygren (inc)	Republican	17,091	66.85%	Ken Holdorf	Dem.	8,461	33.10%	25,565	8,630	
2020	Nov. 3	John Nygren (inc)	Republican	22,823	68.73%	Karl Jaeger	Dem.	10,374	31.24%	33,207	12,449	Andi Rich (Rep.)
2021	Apr. 6	Elijah Behnke	Republican	8,129	63.17%	Karl Jaeger	Dem.	4,732	36.77%	12,868	3,397	Michael Kunesh (Rep.); Debbie Jacques (Rep.); Michael Schneider (Rep.); David Kamps (Rep.)
2022	Nov. 8	Elijah Behnke (inc)	Republican	17,514	66.52%	Jane Benson	Dem.	8,800	33.42%	26,329	8,714	
2024	Nov. 5	Ryan Spaude	Democratic	15,169	51.32%	Patrick Buckley	Rep.	14,343	48.52%	29,559	826	
