= Peter Schmidt (Wisconsin politician) =

American politician (born 1992)

Member of the Wisconsin State Assembly from the 6th district
- In office January 3, 2023 – January 6, 2025
- Preceded by: Gary Tauchen
- Succeeded by: Elijah Behnke

Personal details
- Born: July 3, 1992 (age 34) Shawano, Wisconsin, U.S.
- Party: Republican
- Education: University of Wisconsin–Stevens Point (BA)
- Occupation: Farmer
- Website: Campaign website

Peter A. Schmidt (born July 3, 1992) is an American dairy farmer and Republican politician from Shawano County, Wisconsin. He was a member of the Wisconsin State Assembly, representing Wisconsin's 6th Assembly district from January 2023 to January 2025.

== Biography ==
Peter Schmidt was born in Shawano County, Wisconsin, graduated from St. Paul Lutheran School, and earned his bachelor's degree from the University of Wisconsin–Stevens Point. He is a co-owner of his family farm, the Schmidt Ponderosa farm, which maintains a herd of 1,600 dairy cows.

He has been a member of the Shawano County board of supervisors and the planning commission for the town of Hartland.

== Political career ==
In 2021, Wisconsin State Assembly incumbent Gary Tauchen announced he would not seek re-election in the 2022 election. Schmidt was one of six who sought the Republican nomination to succeed Tauchen. Schmidt ultimately prevailed in the primary by just 63 votes, but soon came under intense controversy. Days after the primary, it was revealed that Schmidt had been the victim of a blackmail attempt by a worker on his family farm, who had a video of Schmidt performing oral sex on another man. The same week, another story came to light in which Schmidt had been charged with a felony for choking another worker on his farm, but had pleaded it down to a misdemeanor.

The controversies caused the Shawano County Republican Party to censure Schmidt and coalesce around a write-in campaign for his Republican primary rival, businessman Dean Neubert. The censure was backed by Republican county officeholders, including the district attorney, sheriff, and clerk of courts, who all said they could not support Schmidt. Many who signed the censure even suggested they would support the Democratic candidate if there were no Republican write-in campaign.

Despite the controversies and the write-in campaign, the district's heavy Republican tilt, created by Wisconsin's strong Republican gerrymander, allowed Schmidt to easily prevail in the general election with 55% of the vote.

In 2023, the Republican gerrymander was struck down by the Wisconsin Supreme Court; under pressure from the court, the legislature agreed to new maps proposed by the Democratic governor in early 2024. Under the new maps, the 6th Assembly district was significantly reconfigured but remained a safely Republican seat and Schmidt was not drawn out of his district or drawn into a matchup against another incumbent. In the neighboring 4th district, however, Republican incumbents Elijah Behnke and David Steffen were drawn into the same district. Rather than running against Steffen, Behnke chose to establish residency in the new 6th district and challenge Schmidt in the primary. Behnke won the primary by a wide margin, taking 58% of the vote.

Schmidt left office on January 6, 2025.

== Electoral history ==
=== Wisconsin Assembly (2022, 2024) ===
Year	Election	Date	Elected				Defeated				Total	Plurality
2022	Primary	Aug. 9	Peter Schmidt	Republican	2,155	23.37%	Dean Martin Neubert	Rep.	2,084	22.60%	9,221	71
2022	Primary	Aug. 9	Peter Schmidt	Republican	2,155	23.37%	Nathan J. Michael	Rep.	1,813	19.66%	9,221	71
2022	Primary	Aug. 9	Peter Schmidt	Republican	2,155	23.37%	David Kohn	Rep.	1,255	13.61%	9,221	71
2022	Primary	Aug. 9	Peter Schmidt	Republican	2,155	23.37%	Craig Arrowood	Rep.	1,076	11.67%	9,221	71
2022	Primary	Aug. 9	Peter Schmidt	Republican	2,155	23.37%	Matthew Kyle Albert	Rep.	836	9.07%	9,221	71
2022	General	Nov. 8	Peter Schmidt	Republican	14,710	55.60%	William J. Switalla	Dem.	7,694	29.08%	26,457	7,016
2022	General	Nov. 8	Peter Schmidt	Republican	14,710	55.60%	Dean Martin Neubert (write-in)	Rep.	4,050	15.31%	26,457	7,016
2024	Primary	Aug. 13	Elijah Behnke	Republican	5,054	58.58%	Peter Schmidt (inc)	Rep.	3,565	41.32%	8,627	1,489

Wisconsin State Assembly
Preceded by Gary Tauchen	Member of the Wisconsin State Assembly from the 6th district January 3, 2023 – January 6, 2025	Succeeded by Elijah Behnke
