= Ryan Spaude =

21st century American politician

Member of the Wisconsin State Assembly from the 89th district
- Incumbent
- Assumed office January 6, 2025
- Preceded by: Elijah Behnke

Personal details
- Born: March 29, 1994 (age 32) Green Bay, Wisconsin, U.S.
- Party: Democratic
- Education: Princeton University; University of Wisconsin Law School (J.D.)
- Profession: Lawyer, politician
- Website: Official website Campaign website

Ryan Matthew Spaude (born March 29, 1994) is an American lawyer and Democratic politician from Ashwaubenon, Wisconsin. He is a member of the Wisconsin State Assembly, representing Wisconsin's 89th Assembly district since 2025. He previously worked as an assistant district attorney in Brown County, Wisconsin.

== Early life and career ==
Ryan Spaude was born in Green Bay, Wisconsin, in March 1994. He was raised by his parents in the town of Little Suamico, Wisconsin and graduated from Oconto Falls High School in 2012. He went on to earn his bachelor's degree from Princeton University in 2016.

After graduating from college, he interned for Congressman Reid Ribble (R–Wis.) and worked as a staff assistant for U.S. Senator Joni Ernst (R–Iowa). In the fall of 2017, he went to work as a researcher for Public Opinion Strategies.

In 2019, he returned to school, attending the University of Wisconsin Law School in Madison. He earned his J.D. in 2022 and was hired as an assistant district attorney in Brown County, Wisconsin. His personal focus was on prosecuting drunk drivers.

== Political career ==
In 2024, the Wisconsin Legislature adopted a new redistricting act which replaced the decade-old Republican gerrymander. The Green Bay area was significantly affected by the changes, and Spaude's home, the politically competitive Green Bay suburb of Ashwaubenon, was moved into a new district—the 89th Assembly district. No incumbent legislator lived within the boundaries of the new 89th Assembly district, and in April 2024, Spaude announced that he would run for the seat as a Democrat. He was unopposed for the Democratic Party nomination, but faced a serious matchup in the general election against Brown County board chair Patrick Buckley. The new 89th Assembly district was projected to be one of the most politically competitive districts in the state and received heavy investment from both parties. Spaude prevailed by 826 votes.

Spaude was inaugurated on January 6, 2025.

During the 2025–27 budget-writing process, Governor Tony Evers proposed giving $2 million to continue funding the state Veteran Housing and Recovery Program, with its three sites in Chippewa Falls, Green Bay, and Union Grove. Republicans stripped the proposed $2 million from Evers' proposed budget. Spaude, as well as senator Jamie Wall and representative Amaad Rivera-Wagner proposed reinserting those funds back into the budget to fund the program and its three facilities.

In August 2025, Spaude and senator Kelda Roys proposed legislation to regulate cryptocurrency ATMs which would require ATM operators to provide warnings about fraud, refund money to victims of cryptocurrency scams, and require operators to provide contact information to authorities. The legislation would additionally provide $1,000 limits to transactions from cryptocurrency ATMs and give authorities the ability to track transactions.

== Personal life and family ==
Ryan Spaude is the son of welder Scott Spaude and dentist Amy Spaude. He is openly gay, and the fifth generation of his family to live in northeast Wisconsin.

== Electoral history ==
=== Wisconsin Assembly (2024) ===
Wisconsin Assembly, 89th District Election, 2024
Party	Candidate	Votes	%	±%
General Election, November 5, 2024
Democratic	Ryan Spaude	15,169	51.32%	+17.89pp
Republican	Patrick Buckley	14,343	48.52%	−18.00pp
	Scattering	47	0.16%	
Plurality		826	2.79%	-30.30pp
Total votes		29,559	100.0%	+12.27%
Democratic gain from Republican				

Wisconsin State Assembly
Preceded by Elijah Behnke	Member of the Wisconsin State Assembly from the 89th district January 6, 2025 – present	Incumbent
