= Shelley Grogan =

American judge (born 1967)

Judge of the Wisconsin Court of Appeals for the 2nd district
- Incumbent
- Assumed office August 1, 2021
- Preceded by: Jeffrey O. Davis

Personal details
- Born: Shelley Ann Grogan; August 14, 1967 (age 58)
- Spouse: Frederick Smith (m. 1992; died 2009)
- Children: 3
- Education: Marquette University (BA, JD)
- Website: Campaign website

Shelley Ann Grogan (born August 14, 1967) is an American lawyer and judge, currently serving on the Wisconsin Court of Appeals in the Waukesha-based District II court. She previously served as a municipal judge in Muskego, Wisconsin.

== Biography ==
Grogan received her bachelor's degree from Marquette University in 1989, and went directly into Marquette University Law School, where she earned her J.D. in 1992.

Early in her legal career, she worked as a clerk to three judges of the Wisconsin Court of Appeals: Ted Wedemeyer, Ralph Adam Fine, and Rebecca Bradley. When Judge Bradley was appointed to the Wisconsin Supreme Court in 2015, Grogan went with her as a judicial assistant.

A resident of Muskego for 25 years, she was appointed municipal judge in 2020. Less than a year later, she announced her candidacy for Wisconsin Court of Appeals. She defeated incumbent judge Jeffrey O. Davis in the April 2021 election with 55% of the vote.

In addition to her judicial career, Grogan has worked as an attorney in civil litigation, and is an adjunct professor at Marquette University Law School.

=== 2023 Wisconsin Supreme Court election ===
During the 2023 Wisconsin Supreme Court election, Grogan was an active and vocal supporter of conservative former justice Daniel Kelly in his campaign to return to the court. Grogan raised eyebrows when she used her perch in the Appeals Court to attack Kelly's conservative rival in the primary, judge Jennifer Dorow. Grogan overruled a sentence handed down by Dorow, called Dorow's sentence unlawful, and then reached out to a number of contacts in the legal community to point to her ruling in an attempt to embarrass and discredit Dorow. In response, conservative talk radio host Mark Belling publicly questioned Grogan's judicial ethics. Reacting to Belling's criticism, Grogan then took the unheard-of step of tweeting out a justification for her court ruling—though she did not offer any justification for her subsequent attempt to advertise and politicize the ruling.

Kelly ultimately prevailed in the primary but lost the general election to liberal candidate, judge Janet Protasiewicz. Grogan deleted her Twitter account the day after the election.

== Personal life ==
Judge Grogan married attorney Frederick J. "Rick" Smith in 1992. They had three children together before his death in 2009.

== Electoral history ==
=== Wisconsin Court of Appeals (2021) ===
Wisconsin Court of Appeals, District II Election, 2021
Party	Candidate	Votes	%
General Election, April 6, 2021
Nonpartisan	Shelley Grogan	149,073	55.80%
Nonpartisan	Jeffrey O. Davis (Incumbent)	117,756	44.08%
Nonpartisan	Scattering	329	0.12%
Plurality		31,317	11.72%
Total votes		267,158	100.0%
