= 2025 Wisconsin Superintendent of Public Instruction election =

- April 1, 2025
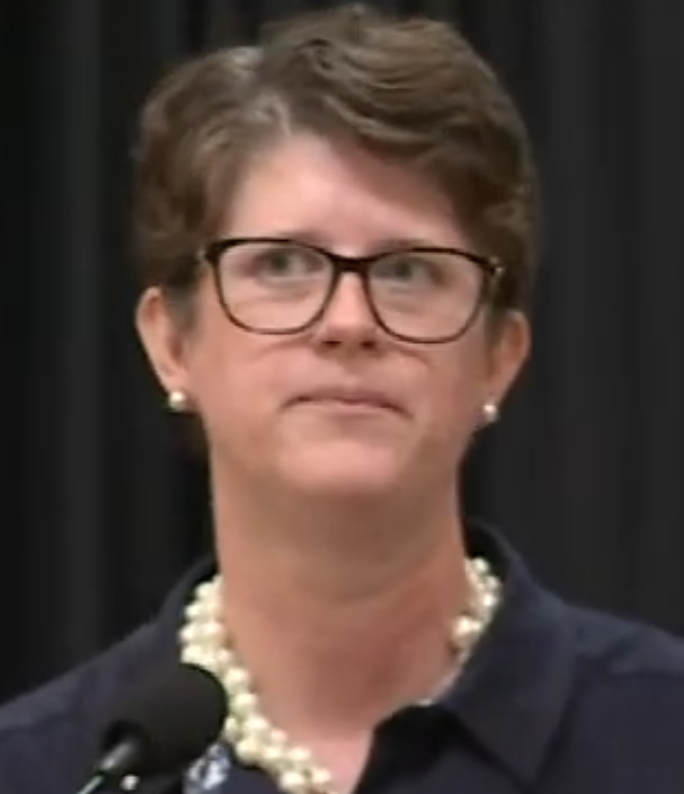

| Candidate | Jill Underly | Brittany Kinser |
| Popular vote | 1,148,427 | 1,022,489 |
| Percentage | 52.71% | 46.93% |
- Underly: 50–60% 60–70% 70–80% Kinser: 50–60% 60–70%
Superintendent before election
Jill Underly
Elected Superintendent
Jill Underly

The 2025 Wisconsin Superintendent of Public Instruction election was a state-wide election held on April 1, 2025, to elect the Superintendent of Public Instruction of Wisconsin for a four-year term. The incumbent superintendent, Jill Underly, was elected to her second four-year term, defeating education consultant Brittany Kinser.

Although the election is technically nonpartisan, Underly received support from the Democratic Party of Wisconsin and Kinser received support from the Republican Party of Wisconsin. Underly won the election with roughly 53% of the vote. Turnout was unusually high for a spring election in Wisconsin, driven by the 2025 Wisconsin Supreme Court election on the same ballot.

Underly and Kinser advanced to the general election as the top two vote-getters in the February 18, 2025, nonpartisan primary. Sauk County superintendent Jeff Wright was eliminated in the primary.

== Primary election ==
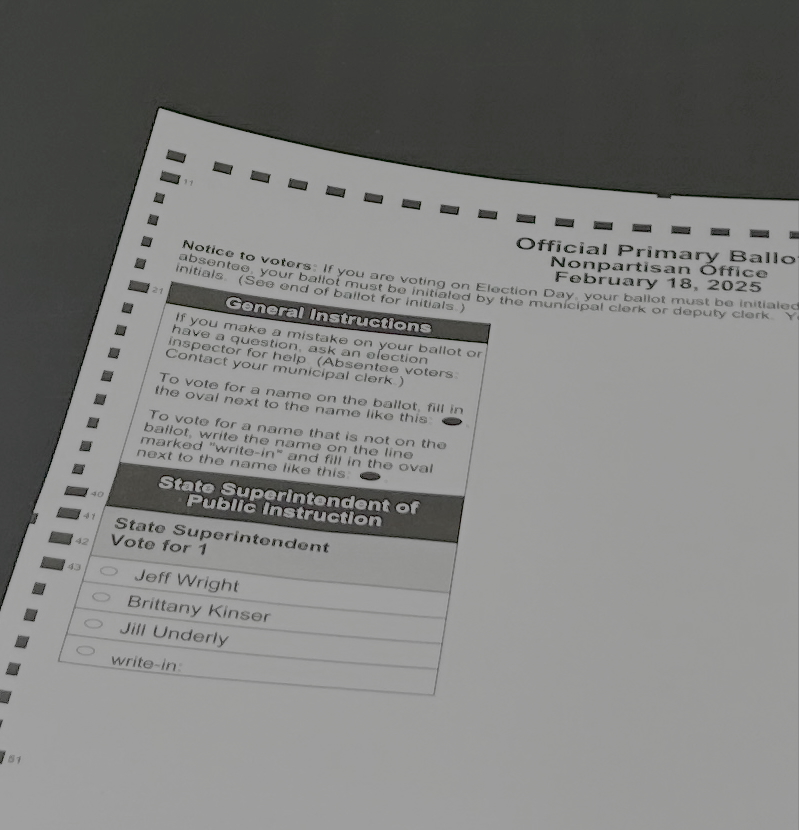
Primary election ballot in with the race for superintendent of public instruction

=== Candidates ===
While Wisconsin Superintendent of Public Instruction elections are officially nonpartisan, media outlets had identified Jill Underly and Jeff Wright as Democratic-aligned candidates, and the Democratic Party of Wisconsin endorsed Underly. Brittany Kinser's campaign was supported by the Republican Party of Wisconsin, though she described herself as both a moderate and a Blue Dog Democrat.

==== Advanced ====
- Brittany Kinser, education consultant
- Jill Underly, incumbent superintendent (2021–present)

==== Eliminated in primary ====
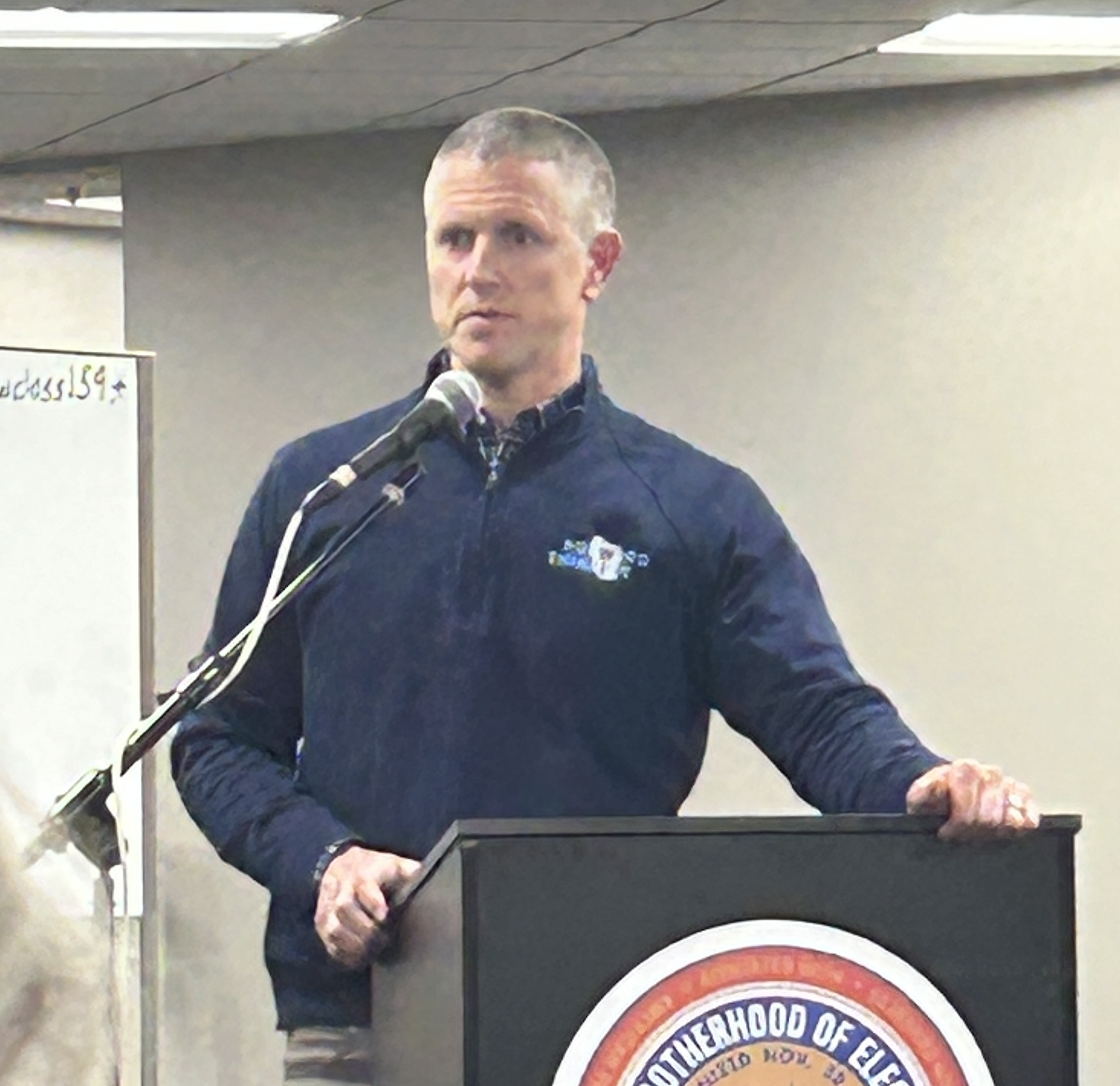
Jeff Wright was eliminated in the primary

- Jeff Wright, Sauk Prairie School District superintendent and former Democratic candidate for State Assembly in 2016 and 2018

=== Endorsements ===
Brittany Kinser

Organizations

- Combined Federal Campaign Action Fund
Jill Underly

U.S. representatives

- Gwen Moore, WI-04 (2005–present)

State legislators

- LaTonya Johnson, state senator from the 6th district (2017–present)
- Kelda Roys, state senator from the 26th district (2021–present)
- Jeff Smith, state senator from the 31st district (2019–present)

Political parties

- Democratic Party of Wisconsin

Labor unions

- Wisconsin AFL-CIO
Jeff Wright

State legislators

- Dale Schultz, former state senator for the 17th district (1991–2015)

Labor unions

- Association of Wisconsin School Administrators
- Wisconsin Education Association Council PAC

Primary county results: Underly: Underly—30–40%; Underly—40–50%; Underly—50–60%; Kinser: Kinser—30–40%; Kinser—40–50%; Kinser—50–60%; Wright: Wright—30–40%; Wright—40–50%; Wright—50–60%

=== Results ===
Nonpartisan primary
| Candidate | Votes | % |
|---|---|---|
| Jill Underly (incumbent) | 177,626 | 37.90% |
| Brittany Kinser | 161,636 | 34.49% |
| Jeff Wright | 128,292 | 27.38% |
| Write-in | 1,055 | 0.23% |
| Total votes | 468,609 | 100.0% |

== General election ==
=== Post-primary endorsements ===
Brittany Kinser

State officials

- Tommy Thompson, former Governor of Wisconsin (1987–2001) and former United States Secretary of Health and Human Services (2001–2005)

Local officials

- Dave Cieslewicz, former mayor of Madison (2003–2011)

Individuals

- Kaleem Caire, CEO of One City Schools
- Howard Fuller, civil rights activist and former Superintendent of Milwaukee Public Schools (1991-1995)

Organizations

- Associated Builders and Contractors
- Democrats for Education Reform

Newspapers

- Wisconsin State Journal
Jill Underly

Labor unions

- Wisconsin Education Association Council (National Education Association affiliate)

Newspapers and other media

- The Cap Times
- The Shepherd Express

=== Polling ===
| Pollster | Date(s) administered | Sample size (Note: Key: A – all adults RV – registered voters LV – likely voters V – unclear) | Margin of error | Jill Underly | Brittany Kinser | Undecided |
|---|---|---|---|---|---|---|
| RMG Research (R) (Note: Poll sponsored by the Napolitan Institute) | February 25–28, 2025 | 800 (RV) | ± 3.5% | 20% | 22% | 58% |

=== Results ===
2025 Wisconsin Superintendent of Public Instruction election
| Candidate | Votes | % |
|---|---|---|
| Jill Underly (incumbent) | 1,148,427 | 52.71% |
| Brittany Kinser | 1,022,489 | 46.93% |
| Adrianne Melby (write-in) | 348 | 0.02% |
| Write-in | 7,305 | 0.34% |
| Total votes | 2,178,569 | 100.00% |

==== By congressional district ====
Underly won four of eight congressional districts, including two that were represented by Republicans.

| District | Underly | Kinser | Representative |
|---|---|---|---|
| 1st | 50% | 49% | Bryan Steil |
| 2nd | 74% | 26% | Mark Pocan |
| 3rd | 53% | 47% | Derrick Van Orden |
| 4th | 71% | 28% | Gwen Moore |
| 5th | 40% | 59% | Scott L. Fitzgerald |
| 6th | 45% | 55% | Glenn Grothman |
| 7th | 43% | 56% | Tom Tiffany |
| 8th | 47% | 53% | Tony Wied |

== See also ==
- 2025 Wisconsin elections

== Notes ==
Partisan clients
