= James R. Charneski =

American politician (1935–2019)

Member of the Wisconsin State Assembly from the 6th district
- In office June 16, 1987 – September 2, 1987
- Preceded by: Robert Cowles
- Succeeded by: Otto Junkermann

Personal details
- Born: July 1, 1935 Green Bay, Wisconsin, US
- Died: March 15, 2019 (aged 83)
- Party: Republican

James R. Charneski (July 1, 1935 – March 15, 2019) was a former member of the Wisconsin State Assembly.

== Biography ==
Charneski was born on July 1, 1935, in Green Bay, Wisconsin. He attended the University of Wisconsin–Green Bay, the University of Wisconsin–Platteville, the University of Wisconsin–Madison and the University of Wisconsin–Whitewater. He served in the United States Coast Guard from 1954 to 1958 and was stationed in the headquarters of the Seventh Coast Guard District in Miami, Florida. He also served in the Brown County, Wisconsin Sheriff's Department for 27 years. Charneski was married and had with four children.

== Political career ==
Charneski was elected to the Assembly in a special election in 1987. Additionally, he served as Supervisor, chairperson and Village President of Allouez, Wisconsin. He is a Republican.
