= Carolyn Stanford Taylor =

American educator, 27th Superintendent of Public Instruction of Wisconsin

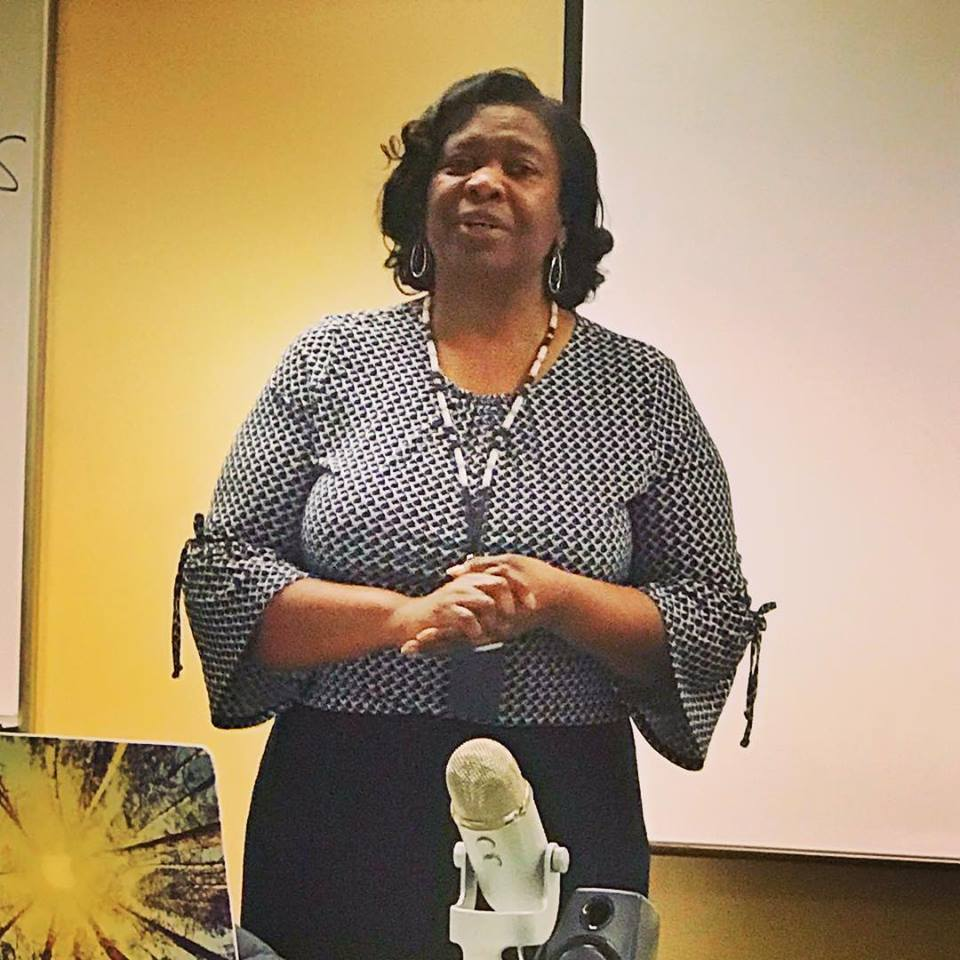

27th Superintendent of Public Instruction of Wisconsin
- In office January 7, 2019 – July 5, 2021
- Governor: Tony Evers
- Preceded by: Tony Evers
- Succeeded by: Jill Underly

Personal details
- Born: 1957 or 1958 (age 68–69) Marks, Mississippi, U.S.
- Party: Democratic
- Education: University of Wisconsin, Madison (BA, MA)

Carolyn Stanford Taylor is an American educator who served as the 27th Wisconsin Superintendent of Public Instruction from 2019 to 2021. Stanford Taylor was the first African American to serve as Wisconsin Superintendent of Public Instruction.

Her appointment was announced by Wisconsin Governor-elect Tony Evers in December 2018, who served as Superintendent of Public Instruction prior to his election as Governor. She did not seek election to a full term in 2021. Prior to assuming the superintendent's office, she served as the Assistant State Superintendent for the Wisconsin Division for Learning Support for 17 years.

== Early life and education ==
Born and raised in Marks, Mississippi, Stanford Taylor and her siblings were one of the first African American families to integrate the schools. She attended the University of Wisconsin, Madison where she received a bachelor's degree in elementary education in 1978 and a master's degree in educational leadership and policy analysis in 1979.

== Career ==
Stanford Taylor served as a classroom teacher and principal in the Madison Metropolitan School District for twenty years, serving as principal of Marquette and Lincoln elementary schools and Wright Middle School. She was the first African-American president of the local teachers union. Prior to her appointment as State Superintendent, Stanford Taylor was the first female, African-American appointed to serve as an assistant state superintendent. She supervised the Special Education Team, one of the agency's largest teams; the Student Services/Prevention and Wellness Team, which focused on student safety, support, and engagement; and the residential schools for students who are blind and visually impaired in Janesville and students who are deaf and hard of hearing in Delavan.

=== Recognition ===
Stanford Taylor is the 2018 recipient Virginia Hart Special Recognition, an award bestowed by the Wisconsin Department of Administration, Division of Personnel Management, to female state employees "who are making a difference through their service to Wisconsin."

Political offices
Preceded by Tony Evers	Wisconsin Superintendent of Public Instruction; 2019–2021	Succeeded by Jill Underly
