= Wisconsin's 6th Assembly district =

American legislative district in northeast Wisconsin

Wisconsin's 6th State Assembly district
- 2024 map defined in 2023 Wisc. Act 94; 2022 map defined in Johnson v. Wisconsin Elections Commission; 2011 map was defined in 2011 Wisc. Act 43
Assemblymember
Elijah Behnke; R–Chase
since January 6, 2025 (1 years)
- Demographics: 87.07% White; 1.04% Black; 2.65% Hispanic; 1.92% Asian; 7.2% Native American; 0.09% Hawaiian/Pacific Islander
- Population (2020) • Voting age: 59,076; 44,923
- Website: Official website
- Notes: Northeast Wisconsin

The 6th Assembly district of Wisconsin is one of 99 districts in the Wisconsin State Assembly. Located in northeast Wisconsin, the district comprises all of Menominee County, most of Shawano County, and parts of western Oconto County, northeast Waupaca County, and northwest Brown County, including the cities of Shawano, Clintonville, and Gillett, and the villages of Bonduel, Bowler, Cecil, Embarrass, and Pulaski. It also contains the Menominee Indian Reservation and the Stockbridge–Munsee Community. The district is represented by Republican Elijah Behnke, since January 2025; Behnke previously represented the 89th district from May 2021 to January 2025.

The 6th Assembly district is located within Wisconsin's 2nd Senate district, along with the 4th and 5th Assembly districts.

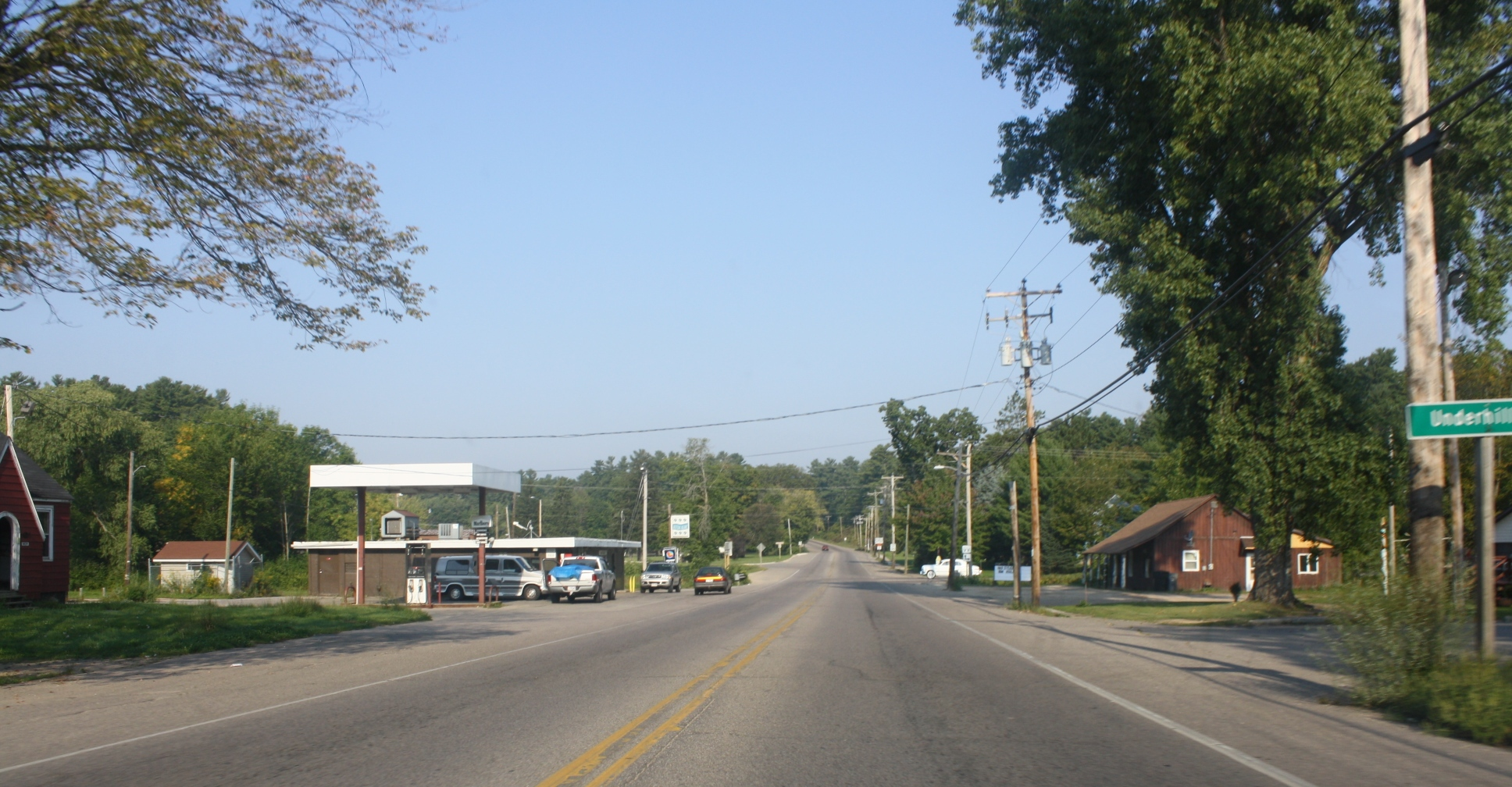
Keshena, in the Menominee Indian Reservation

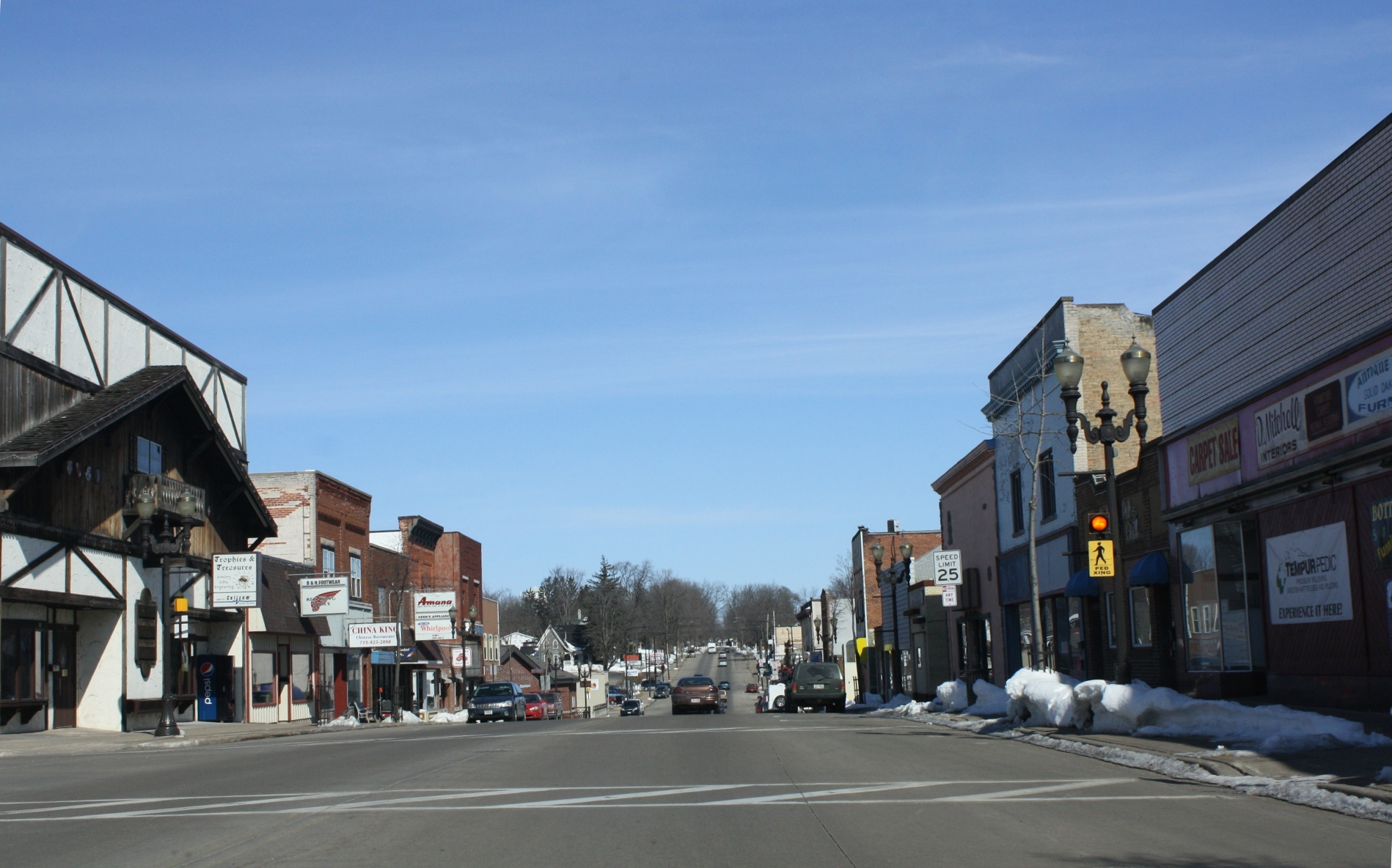
Downtown Clintonville

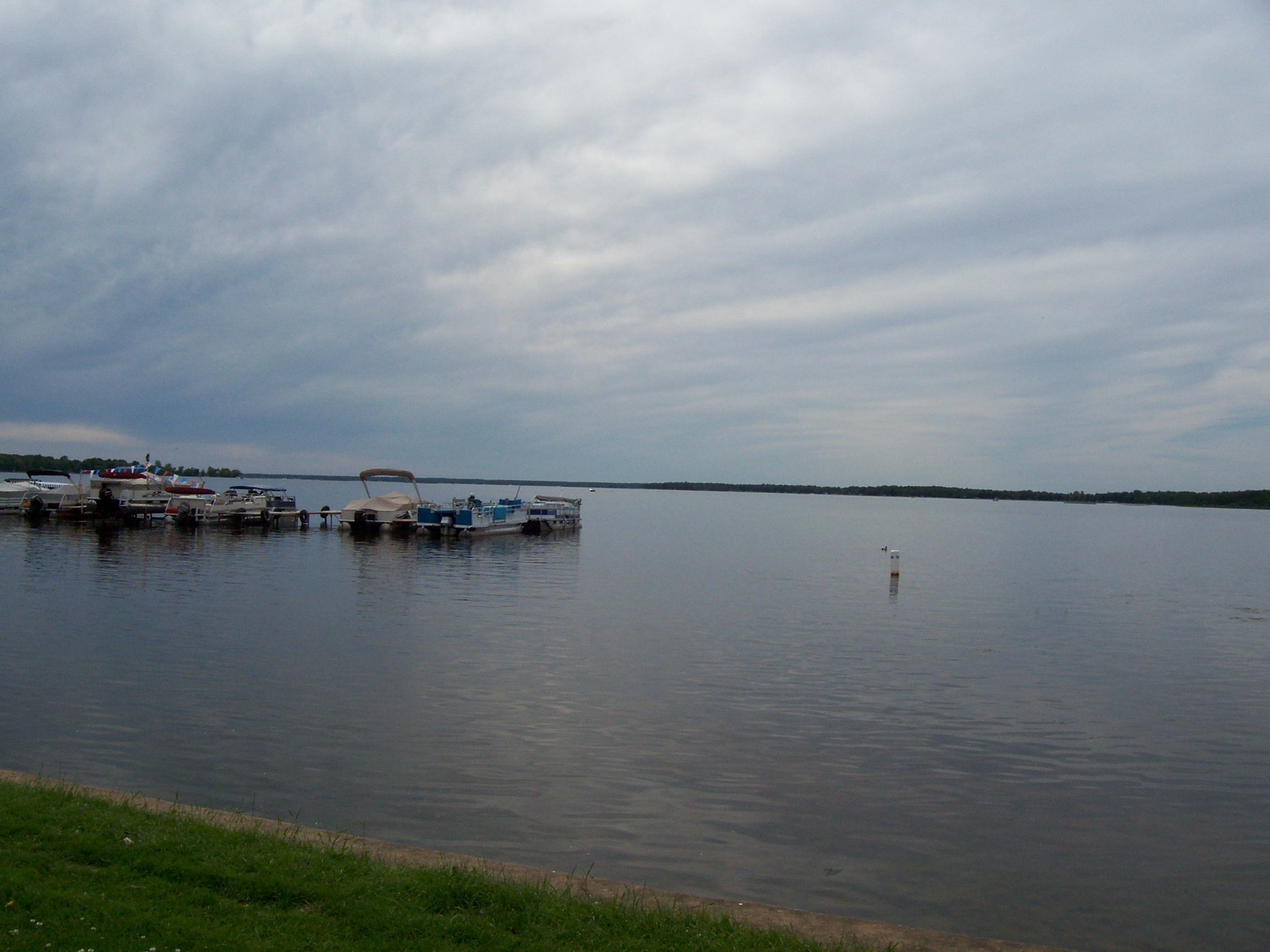
Shawano Lake

== List of past representatives ==
List of representatives to the Wisconsin State Assembly from the 6th district
Member	Party	Residence	Counties represented	Term start	Term end	Ref.
District created
Gervase Hephner	Dem.	Chilton	Calumet, Fond du Lac, Sheboygan, Washington	January 1, 1973	January 3, 1983	
Gus Menos	Dem.	Brown Deer	Milwaukee	January 3, 1983	January 7, 1985	
Robert Cowles	Rep.	Green Bay	Brown	January 7, 1985	April 21, 1987	
--Vacant--			Brown	April 21, 1987	June 16, 1987	
James R. Charneski	Rep.	Allouez	Brown	June 16, 1987	September 2, 1987	
--Vacant--			Brown	September 2, 1987	December 8, 1987	
Otto Junkermann	Rep.	Green Bay	Brown	December 8, 1987	January 3, 1989	
Rosemary Hinkfuss	Dem.	Green Bay	Brown	January 3, 1989	January 4, 1993	
John Ainsworth	Rep.	Waukechon	Oconto, Outagamie, Shawano	January 4, 1993	January 1, 2007	
John Ainsworth	Rep.	Waukechon	Oconto, Outagamie, Shawano, Waupaca	January 4, 1993	January 1, 2007	
Gary Tauchen	Rep.	Bonduel	Oconto, Outagamie, Shawano, Waupaca	January 1, 2007	January 2, 2023	
Gary Tauchen	Rep.	Bonduel	Brown, Outagamie, Shawano, Waupaca	January 1, 2007	January 2, 2023	
Peter Schmidt	Rep.	Bonduel	Brown, Outagamie, Shawano, Waupaca	January 3, 2023	January 6, 2025	
Elijah Behnke	Rep.	Chase	Brown, Menominee, Oconto, Shawano, Waupaca	January 6, 2025	Current	
