= Jeffrey O. Davis =

American judge, Wisconsin Court of Appeals

Judge of the Wisconsin Court of Appeals District II
- In office October 16, 2019 – July 31, 2021
- Appointed by: Tony Evers
- Preceded by: Brian Hagedorn
- Succeeded by: Shelley Grogan

Personal details
- Born: December 8, 1961 (age 64)
- Education: Miami University (B.S.); Ohio State Moritz College of Law (J.D.)
- Profession: lawyer, judge
- Website: Judge Jeffrey O. Davis

Jeffrey O. Davis (born December 8, 1961) is an American lawyer and jurist. He served as a judge of the Wisconsin Court of Appeals in the Waukesha-based District II court from October 2019 until July 31, 2021. He has been a practicing attorney for over thirty years as an associate and partner with the national law firm Quarles & Brady.

== Biography ==
Davis graduated from Miami University in 1984 and Ohio State University Moritz College of Law in 1987. He subsequently joined the law firm Quarles & Brady, ultimately becoming a partner and chair of the firm's insurance recovery group. As an attorney, Davis participated in commercial litigation, and assisted clients with legal risk-management strategies dealing with long-term liabilities. In cases before the Wisconsin Supreme Court and in arbitration, he has secured judgements on behalf of insured clients in multi-million dollar insurance disputes arising out of Asbestos and other long tail claims, including the precedent-setting case of Plastics Engineering v. Liberty Mutual. In addition, he has had an active practice on litigating non-compete claims.

In addition to his career as an attorney, he has been a lecturer and adjunct professor of law at Marquette University Law School, and, from 2007 to 2009, he was an elected village trustee of Fox Point, Wisconsin, a Milwaukee suburb.

On September 4, 2019, Davis was appointed to the Wisconsin Court of Appeals by Democratic governor Tony Evers. He filled the vacancy created by the departure of Judge Brian Hagedorn, who had been elected to the Wisconsin Supreme Court. Davis is chambered in Waukesha. Judge Davis was defeated seeking election to a full six-year term in April 2021.

Legal offices
Preceded by Brian Hagedorn	Judge of the Wisconsin Court of Appeals District II; October 16, 2019 – July 31, 2021	Succeeded by Shelley Grogan
