= Elijah Behnke =

American politician (born 1983)

Member of the Wisconsin State Assembly
- Incumbent
- Assumed office January 6, 2025
- Preceded by: Peter Schmidt
- Constituency: 6th district
- In office May 11, 2021 – January 6, 2025
- Preceded by: John Nygren
- Succeeded by: Ryan Spaude
- Constituency: 89th district

Personal details
- Born: February 15, 1983 (age 43) Oconto Falls, Wisconsin
- Party: Republican
- Education: Toccoa Falls College (AA)
- Occupation: business owner, politician

Elijah Behnke (born February 15, 1983) is an American small business owner and Republican politician from Oconto County, Wisconsin. He is a member of the Wisconsin State Assembly, representing the 6th Assembly district since January 2025; prior to the 2024 redistricting, he represented the 89th Assembly district from May 2021 until January 2025.

== Early life and career ==
Behnke was born in Oconto Falls, Wisconsin, and raised on his parents' nearby farm. He worked on the farm through his childhood and graduated from Oconto High School in 2001. He went on to attend Toccoa Falls College, a bible college in northeast Georgia, earning his associate degree in 2005.

In 2006, he returned to Wisconsin and started working for his mother's cleaning business. After a year, he started his own cleaning business, Eschalon Cleaning LLC. In addition to his cleaning business, Behnke operates a hobby farm and is a ministry leader in his church.

== Political career ==
In December 2020, just after the 2020 election, state representative John Nygren announced he would resign from office. Within days, Behnke announced his candidacy for the Republican nomination to succeed Nygren in the Assembly. In his campaign, Behnke stated that one of his motivations in running for office was to seek relief for small business owners like himself who had been harmed by the COVID-19 pandemic and the resultant public safety measures. In the Republican primary, Behnke was endorsed by neighboring State Senator André Jacque and Oconto County Sheriff Todd Skarban, as well as other state Republican interest groups, such as Wisconsin Family Action, Pro Life Wisconsin, and Wisconsin Right to Life. Behnke topped the five-person Republican primary field with nearly 45% of the vote. He went on to defeat Democrat Karl Jaeger in the April special election.

A recording of Behnke speaking in the Wisconsin State Capitol emerged in January 2022. Behnke referred to fabricated claims of Democratic electoral fraud, and urged his listeners: "Let's cheat like the Democrats do."

On Wednesday, June 22, 2022, Governor Evers’ called for a special session to defend reproductive rights in Wisconsin to introduce and pass AB 713 and AB 106, which would have protected the right for women to have a say over their bodies. Despite bipartisan support for legal access to abortion from both Wisconsin Democrats and Republicans, Elijah Behnke and other Republicans in the Legislature gaveled in and gaveled out at the special session without taking action and leaving 1.3 million Wisconsin women of reproductive age without access to a legal abortion.

Following the 2024 redistricting act, which abolished the decade-old Republican gerrymander, Behnke was drawn out of his former district and drawn into the new 4th Assembly district, where he would have faced an incumbent vs incumbent primary against 4th district incumbent David Steffen. Rather than running in this district, Behnke announced he would relocate to instead challenge incumbent Peter Schmidt in a Republican primary in the 6th Assembly district. Despite the new district comprising none of the territory of his previous district, Behnke defeated Schmidt in the primary with 58% of the vote; he went on to win the general election in the overwhelmingly Republican district.

== Electoral history ==
=== Wisconsin Assembly, 89th district (2021, 2022) ===
Year	Election	Date	Elected				Defeated				Total	Plurality
2021	Special; Primary	Feb. 16	Elijah Behnke	Republican	1,691	44.75%	Michael T. Kunesh	Rep.	875	23.15%	3,779	816
2021	Special; Primary	Feb. 16	Elijah Behnke	Republican	1,691	44.75%	Debbie Jacques	Rep.	789	20.88%	3,779	816
2021	Special; Primary	Feb. 16	Elijah Behnke	Republican	1,691	44.75%	Michael Schneider	Rep.	264	6.99%	3,779	816
2021	Special; Primary	Feb. 16	Elijah Behnke	Republican	1,691	44.75%	David Kamps	Rep.	160	4.23%	3,779	816
2021	Special	Apr. 6	Elijah Behnke	Republican	8,129	63.17%	Karl Jaeger	Dem.	4,732	36.77%	12,868	3,397
2022	General	Nov. 8	Elijah Behnke (inc)	Republican	17,514	66.52%	Jane Benson	Dem.	8,800	33.42%	26,329	8,714

=== Wisconsin Assembly, 6th district (2024) ===
Year	Election	Date	Elected				Defeated				Total	Plurality
2024	Primary	Aug. 13	Elijah Behnke	Republican	5,054	58.58%	Peter Schmidt (inc)	Rep.	3,565	41.32%	8,627	1,489
2024	General	Nov. 5	Elijah Behnke	Republican	21,941	67.37%	Shirley Hinze	Dem.	10,593	32.53%	32,566	11,348

Wisconsin State Assembly
Preceded by John Nygren	Member of the Wisconsin State Assembly from the 89th district May 11, 2021 – January 6, 2025	Succeeded by Ryan Spaude
Preceded by Peter Schmidt	Member of the Wisconsin State Assembly from the 6th district January 6, 2025 – present	Incumbent
