= Katie Kegel =

21st century American judge

The Honorable Katie Beth Kegel

Judge of the Milwaukee County Circuit Court Branch 3
- Incumbent
- Assumed office August 2021
- Preceded by: Clare Fiorenza

Personal details
- Born: 1985 or 1986 (age 40–41)
- Spouse: Noel Kegel
- Education: Charleston Southern University; Marquette University Law School
- Profession: Lawyer, judge

Katie Beth Kegel is an American attorney and judge from Milwaukee, Wisconsin. She has served as a Wisconsin Circuit Court Judge in Milwaukee County since 2021, and was previously a state public defender.

== Life and career ==
Kegel was born and raised in Clintonville, Wisconsin. She earned her bachelor's degree from Charleston Southern University.

Kegel graduated from the Marquette University Law School in 2011. After law school, Kegel worked as an assistant public defender in Waukesha County.

Legal offices
Preceded by Clare Fiorenza	Wisconsin Circuit Judge for the Milwaukee Circuit, Branch 3; 2021 – present	Incumbent
