= Otto Junkermann =

American politician

Member of the Wisconsin State Assembly from the 6th district
- In office December 8, 1987 – January 3, 1989
- Preceded by: James R. Charneski
- Succeeded by: Rosemary Hinkfuss

Personal details
- Born: February 7, 1929 Milwaukee, Wisconsin
- Died: July 27, 2016 (aged 87) Green Bay, Wisconsin
- Party: Republican
- Occupation: Businessman, politician

Otto Junkermann (February 7, 1929 – July 27, 2016) was an American businessman from Green Bay, Wisconsin, and a former Republican member of the Wisconsin Assembly from the Sixth District (parts of Brown County).

In 2011, he ran as a "fake Democrat" in the Democratic primary against former Brown County Executive Nancy Nusbaum in the preamble to the recall election against Senator Robert Cowles. He lost by a wide margin.
