= John Nygren =

21st-century American politician and health insurance lobbyist

Member of the Wisconsin State Assembly from the 89th district
- In office January 1, 2007 – December 2, 2020
- Preceded by: John Gard
- Succeeded by: Elijah Behnke

Personal details
- Born: February 27, 1964 (age 62) Marinette, Wisconsin, U.S.
- Party: Republican
- Spouse: Maggie
- Children: Cassie, Cali, and Colin
- Profession: insurance and financial services agent, politician, lobbyist
- Website: Official website

John Nygren (born February 27, 1964) is an American insurance and financial services agent, politician, and lobbyist. A Republican, he was a member of the Wisconsin State Assembly for nearly 14 years, serving from January 2007 to December 2020. He was co-chair of the powerful Joint Finance Committee from 2013 until his sudden resignation on December 1, 2020. He now works as executive director for the Wisconsin Association of Health Plans, a state lobbying organization for health insurance companies. Prior to holding public office, he was President of the United States Junior Chamber youth organization.

== Early life and career ==
Nygren is a fourth generation resident of northeast Wisconsin. He graduated from Marinette High School in 1982, studied at the University of Wisconsin-Marinette, and worked in the restaurant industry for over 12 years, eventually becoming co-owner/operator of his own establishment. In 1998 he started work at Great Lakes Financial Management Group selling insurance and other financial services.

Nygren was involved with the Jaycees, serving as Marinette's chapter president, the regional director for Northeast Wisconsin, Wisconsin state president, and United States national president.

== Political career ==
Nygren was chairman of the Marinette County Republican Party and served on the City of Marinette Recreation and Planning Board from 2003 to 2006. In 2006, Nygren ran for Wisconsin State Assembly to replace Speaker John Gard, who was vacating his Assembly seat to run for United States House of Representatives. Nygren narrowly won the Republican primary election, defeating former state senator Gary Drzewiecki by just 37 votes. Nygren went on to defeat Democrat Randy Koehn in the November general election with 54% of the vote.

In the Assembly, he was assigned to the standing committees on Insurance; on Education, Health and Health care reform; and on Jobs and the Economy.

Nygren was re-elected seven times, facing a Democratic opponent in six of the seven general elections. After the 2011 redistricting, Nygren's district became more safely Republican, and he did not receive less than 59% in any election after redistricting.

=== 2011 recall elections ===
In 2011, a recall campaign was initiated by Democrats, resulting from the upheaval over the Budget Repair bill. Republicans retaliated by launching their own recall effort, targeting Democratic state senators. One of the senators who was successfully pulled into a recall was Democrat Dave Hansen. Nygren, who lived in his district, sought to challenge him in the recall election. However, the Wisconsin Government Accountability Board ruled that he was two signatures short of the necessary 400 signatures on his nomination petition, and thus his name would not appear on the ballot.

=== Resignation ===
Nygren won a substantial victory in 2020 with 68% of the vote. However, only a month after the election, Nygren announced he would immediately resign his seat. Governor Tony Evers announced he would call a special election to fill the vacancy. On December 14, it was announced that Nygren would work as executive director at the Wisconsin Association of Health Plans, a lobbying group for health insurers.

== Personal life ==
Nygren is married to Maggie, a family and consumer education teacher at Marinette High School, and they have three children; Cassie, Cali and Colin. The Nygren family is active at Faith Lutheran Church. John serves as church elder, and previously spent four years as church president.

In January 2020, Nygren's daughter, Cassie, was found guilty of being a party to a first-degree reckless homicide stemming from the death of a pregnant woman to whom she sold drugs.

== Electoral history ==
=== Wisconsin Assembly (2006, 2008, 2010, 2012) ===
Wisconsin Assembly, 89th District Election, 2006
Party	Candidate	Votes	%	±%
Republican Primary, September 12, 2006
Republican	John Nygren	2,777	50.32%	
Republican	Gary F. Drzewiecki	2,740	49.65%	
	Scattering	2	0.04%	
Plurality		37	0.67%	
Total votes		5,519	100.0%	
General Election, November 7, 2006
Republican	John Nygren	11,844	54.10%	−9.71%
Democratic	Randy Koehn	10,011	45.73%	+9.59%
	Scattering	36	0.16%	
Plurality		1,833	8.37%	
Total votes		21,891	100.0%	-23.31%
Republican hold				

Wisconsin Assembly, 89th District Election, 2008
Party	Candidate	Votes	%	±%
General Election, November 4, 2008
Republican	John Nygren (incumbent)	14,814	53.54%	−0.56%
Democratic	Randy Koehn	12,839	46.40%	+0.67%
	Scattering	15	0.05%	
Plurality		1,975	8.37%	-1.24%
Total votes		27,668	100.0%	+26.39%
Republican hold				

Wisconsin Assembly, 89th District Election, 2010
Party	Candidate	Votes	%	±%
General Election, November 2, 2010
Republican	John Nygren (incumbent)	15,788	67.68%	+14.14%
Democratic	Bob Orwig	7,520	32.24%	−14.17%
	Scattering	18	0.08%	
Plurality		8,268	35.45%	+28.31%
Total votes		23,326	100.0%	-15.69%
Republican hold				

Wisconsin Assembly, 89th District Election, 2012
Party	Candidate	Votes	%	±%
General Election, November 6, 2012
Republican	John Nygren (incumbent)	16,081	59.05%	−8.63%
Democratic	Joe Reinhard	11,129	40.87%	+8.63%
	Scattering	22	0.08%	
Plurality		4,952	18.18%	-17.26%
Total votes		27,232	100.0%	+16.75%
Republican hold				

=== Wisconsin Assembly (2014, 2016, 2018, 2020) ===
Wisconsin Assembly, 89th District Election, 2016
Party	Candidate	Votes	%	±%
General Election, November 8, 2016
Republican	John Nygren (incumbent)	19,429	68.20%	
Democratic	Heidi Fencl	9,055	31.78%	
	Scattering	5	0.02%	
Plurality		10,374	36.41%	+28.31%
Total votes		28,489	100.0%	+53.17%
Republican hold				

Wisconsin Assembly, 89th District Election, 2018
Party	Candidate	Votes	%	±%
General Election, November 6, 2018
Republican	John Nygren (incumbent)	17,091	66.85%	−1.35%
Democratic	Ken Holdorf	8,461	33.10%	
	Scattering	13	0.05%	
Plurality		8,630	33.76%	-2.66%
Total votes		25,565	100.0%	-10.26%
Republican hold				

Wisconsin Assembly, 89th District Election, 2020
Party	Candidate	Votes	%	±%
General Election, November 3, 2020
Republican	John Nygren (incumbent)	22,823	68.73%	+1.88%
Democratic	Karl Jaeger	10,374	31.24%	−1.86%
	Scattering	10	0.03%	
Plurality		12,449	37.49%	+3.73%
Total votes		33,207	100.0%	+29.89%
Republican hold				

Non-profit organization positions
Preceded by Sydney Ward	President of the United States Jaycees; 2002	Succeeded by Mike Faller
Wisconsin State Assembly
Preceded by John Gard	Member of the Wisconsin State Assembly from the 89th district January 1, 2007 – December 2, 2020	Succeeded by Elijah Behnke
