= Pecatonica Area School District =

School district in Wisconsin, United States

Address
- 704 Cross Street Blanchardville, Wisconsin, 53516; United States

District information
- Type: Public
- Grades: PreK–12
- Schools: 2
- NCES District ID: 5501310

Students and staff
- Students: 369 (2024–25)
- Teachers: 39.80 (on an FTE basis)
- Staff: 28.45 (on an FTE basis)
- Student–teacher ratio: 9.27:1

Other information
- Website: www.pecatonica.k12.wi.us

Pecatonica Area School District is a school district based in Blanchardville, Wisconsin, United States.

It operates Pecatonica MS/HS and Pecatonica Elementary School. The MS/HS and District Office, are located in Blanchardville, WI, while the elementary building is located in Hollandale, Wisconsin.

The school district is rural, encompassing an area of Lafayette County, Iowa County, Green County, and Dane County. The majority of the students live in Iowa County and Lafayette County, particularly in the Villages of Blanchardville, Hollandale, and the Town of Moscow.

== History ==
The school district consolidated in 1971, and the first graduating class of Pecatonica High School was in May 1972. The Village of Blanchardville's school building - Blanchardville High School - became the Pecatonica High School, with classes of 7th and 8th grade operating in the top floor. The Village of Hollandale's "Hollandale High School" building became the elementary building in the original structure, built in 1952, operating grades 1st through 6th. Initially, the Village of Argyle was to be included in the consolidation plans between the villages, but dropped out of consideration, according to the original consolidation study, in 1969.

== Curriculum ==
The school district's curriculum includes a college prep curriculum as well as courses that prepare students for some additional post-secondary study, perhaps at a technical or other 2-year college. Each year, the graduating class, which ranges from 30 to 45 students, sends students to top public and private universities in the State of Wisconsin, and 2-year colleges, primarily Southwest Technical College in Fennimore, and Madison College, in Madison, WI. Pecatonica High School is one of only 60 high schools in the State that offers computer science programming courses, including AP Computer Science. This High School campus is located only 20 miles from EPIC Systems in Verona, WI. The high school curriculum also has strong offerings in health, nutrition, and bio-technology, biology, physics, and agriculture. The art and music programs are well known in the area. Each year, the students are exposed to strong curricular field trips in the nearby State Parks, as well as arts opportunities at nearby "American Players Theater" and the Overture Center in Madison, WI, and offerings on the University of Wisconsin–Madison campus. In 2013 the school district entered a cooperative distance learning consortium with Mineral Point High School, Kickapoo High School, Riverdale High School, and Highland High School, to expand curricular offerings to students, particularly in electives and Advanced Placement courses.

== Athletics ==
The school district has a strong athletics program, particularly due to the efforts of the Pecatonica Booster Club's Little Vikings Program for elementary and middle school students. There are several cooperatives in place with nearby Argyle School District.

Fall sports include the cooperative for football and cross-country (boys and girls), and volleyball.

Winter sports include girls and boys basketball, and a wrestling cooperative.

Spring sports include softball and baseball, and a track and field cooperative and golf cooperative.

The Pecatonica track and field team has had extraordinary seasons the past 10 years with athletes every year competing at the state championships. Recently, they had a men’s 4x800 meter relay team get 4th at state with a new school record. And this past year Ridge Toay podiumed in 2 hurdle events and broke the school records for those events. The pecatonica golf team has recently seen some success with one of their athletes qualifying for state this past year. The pecatonica baseball team has also had a lot of success, but like the previous years ended their season short with a disappointing loss due to a comeback.
