= Wisconsin Department of Public Instruction =

State agency in Wisconsin, United States

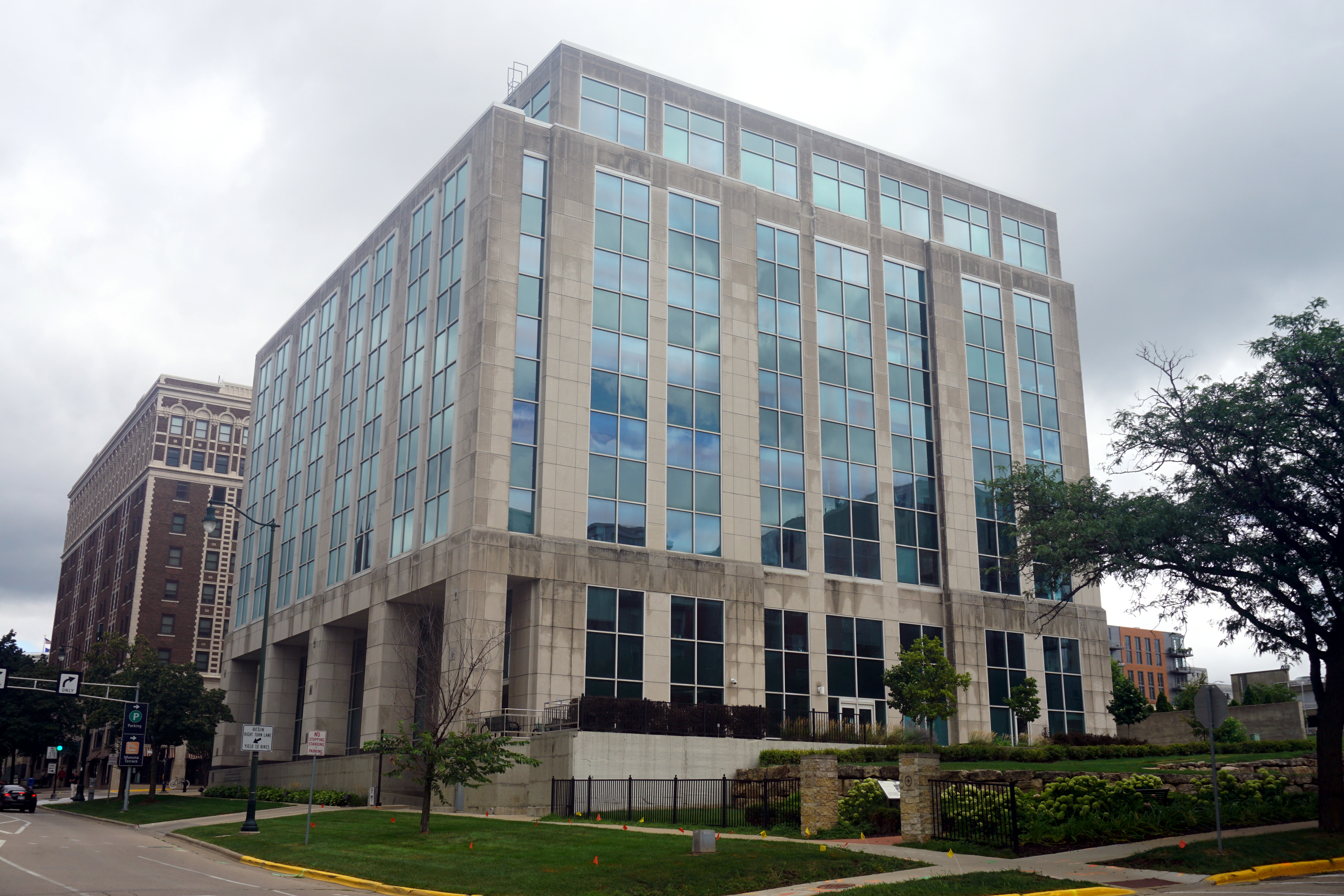
- Tommy G. Thompson Center

Agency overview
- Formed: March 13, 1848; 178 years ago
- Headquarters: Tommy G. Thompson Building (TGT); 201 W. Washington Ave. Madison, Wisconsin, U.S. 43°04′21.8″N 89°23′10.4″W
- Employees: 644 (2023)
- Annual budget: $16,249,627,000 (2023)
- Agency executive: Jill Underly, Superintendent of Public Instruction
- Website: dpi.wi.gov

The Wisconsin Department of Public Instruction (DPI) is an agency of the Wisconsin state government responsible for overseeing state education and public libraries in Wisconsin. In addition to oversight of public primary and secondary education, the department administers a number of other educational, vocational, and special needs programs. It also provides professional services and licensing for teachers, administrators, library professionals, and student services personnel. The department also distributes state and federal education aid to local districts and programs.

The Department is led by Superintendent Jill Underly, since being elected in 2021. The office of superintendent is a constitutional officer of the government of Wisconsin, established in Article X of the Constitution of Wisconsin. The superintendent is elected in state-wide nonpartisan elections every four years in the Spring following the U.S. presidential election.

The Department's main office is located in the Tommy G. Thompson Building (TGT) in downtown Madison, Wisconsin; it maintains several other offices throughout the state for specialized services.
