= 2016 Wisconsin Supreme Court election =

- April 5, 2016
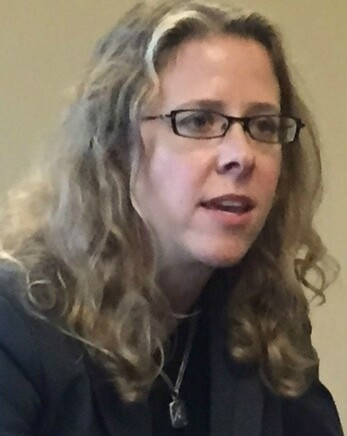

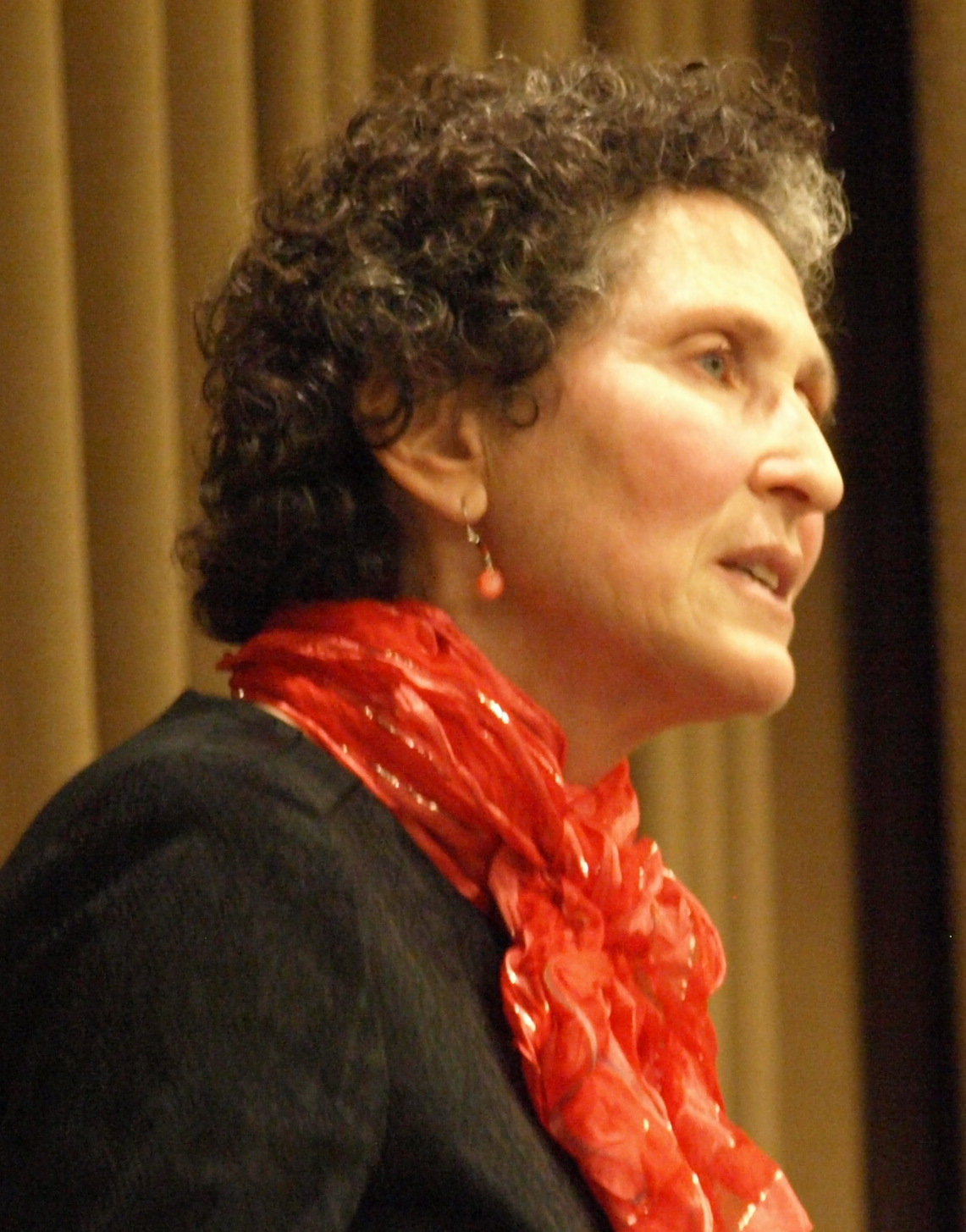
Candidate	Rebecca Bradley	JoAnne Kloppenburg
Popular vote	1,024,892	929,377
Percentage	52.35%	47.47%
- County results Bradley: 50–60% 60–70% 70–80% Kloppenburg: 50–60% 60–70% 70–80%
Justice before election
Rebecca Bradley
Elected Justice
Rebecca Bradley

The 2016 Wisconsin Supreme Court election was held on April 5, 2016, to elect a justice of the Wisconsin Supreme Court for a ten-year term. Incumbent justice Rebecca Bradley defeated Wisconsin Court of Appeals judge JoAnne Kloppenburg.

As more than two candidates filed to run, a nonpartisan primary was held on February 17, 2016. In the primary, Milwaukee County circuit judge Joe Donald was eliminated.

== Appointment ==
Incumbent Justice N. Patrick Crooks announced on September 16, 2015, that he would retire and not seek reelection. One week later, Crooks died unexpectedly in his court chambers, leaving a vacancy before the spring election. Amongst the three announced candidates (Note: Rebecca Bradley, JoAnne Kloppenburg, and Joe Donald) prior to Crooks' death, Kloppenburg stated she would not apply for the interim vacancy while Donald stated that Governor Scott Walker should not appoint anyone that is already a candidate in the spring election, reasoning that it would unfairly influence the upcoming election. Bradley, who had been previously appointed by Governor Walker twice, first to the Milwaukee County Circuit Court in 2012, and again to the Wisconsin Court of Appeals in May 2015, did apply for the vacancy. On October 9, 2015, Governor Walker announced he has appointed to Judge Rebecca Bradley to the vacant seat. Democratic legislative leaders in the Wisconsin Assembly and Wisconsin Senate denounced Bradley's appointment.

=== Appointee ===
- Rebecca Bradley, Judge of the Wisconsin Court of Appeals (District I division)

=== Considered but not appointed ===
- Claude Covelli, attorney
- Jim Troupis, Judge of the Dane County Circuit (Branch 3)

== Primary election ==
=== Candidates ===
==== Advanced ====
- Rebecca Bradley, incumbent Supreme Court justice
- JoAnne Kloppenburg, Judge of the Wisconsin Court of Appeals (District IV division)

==== Eliminated in primary ====
- M. Joseph Donald, Judge of the Milwaukee County Circuit Court (Branch 2)

==== Withdrawn ====
- Claude Covelli, personal injury attorney

=== Endorsements ===
Rebecca Bradley

County officials

- David Clarke, Milwaukee County sheriff (Democratic)

Labor unions

- Milwaukee Police Association
- Milwaukee Professional Firefighters Association

Organizations

- Wisconsin Club for Growth
- Wisconsin Manufacturers & Commerce
- Wisconsin Realtors Association
- Wisconsin Restaurant Association
- Wisconsin Right to Life

Political parties

- Wisconsin Republican Party
Joe Donald

County and local officials

- Chris Abele, Milwaukee County executive (Democratic)
- Tom Barrett, mayor of Milwaukee (Democratic)

Federal officials

- Herb Kohl, former U.S. senator from Wisconsin (1989–2013) (Democratic)
- Gwen Moore, U.S. representative for WI-4 (Democratic)

Labor unions

- Ironworkers Local 8

Organizations

- Citizen Action

Newspapers

- The Shepherd Express (co-endorsement with JoAnne Kloppenburg)
JoAnne Kloppenburg

Federal officials

- Dave Obey, former U.S. representative for WI-7 (1969–2011) (Democratic)

Individuals

- Vel Phillips, civil rights activist, former Wisconsin Secretary of State (1979–1983)

Labor unions

- IBEW Local 159
- Wisconsin Association of Letter Carriers

Newspapers

- The Shepherd Express (co-endorsement with Joe Donald)

=== Results ===
Results by county: Bradley: Bradley 30–40%; Bradley 40–50%; Bradley 50–60%; Bradley 60–70%; Bradley 70–80%; Kloppenburg: Kloppenburg 40–50%; Kloppenburg 50–60%; Kloppenburg 60–70%; Kloppenburg 70–80%

2016 Wisconsin Supreme Court primary election
Candidate	Votes	%
Rebecca Bradley (incumbent)	252,932	44.61%
JoAnne Kloppenburg	244,729	43.16%
Joe Donald	68,746	12.12%
Write-in	631	0.11%
Total votes	567,038	100.0%

== General election ==
=== Campaign ===
Bradley ran as a judicial conservative, arguing that “the role of a justice is to interpret the law, not invent it,” and criticizing Kloppenburg as a candidate who would “legislate from the bench.” Kloppenburg was supported by liberal groups, she did not identify herself as a liberal, instead describing herself as a “judicial independent.” Kloppenburg sought to highlight Bradley’s conservative and partisan background, including her prior association with the Republican National Lawyers Association and her past presidency of the Milwaukee chapter of the Federalist Society. Kloppenburg also criticized Bradley for a news column she wrote, defending the right of pharmacists to refuse to fill prescriptions for contraceptives based on their religious beliefs.

One month before the election, One Wisconsin Now held a news conference surrounding controversial articles Bradley had written during her time as a college student at Marquette University in 1992. Her writings were in response to the results of the 1992 United States presidential election. In those writings, Bradley made several inflammatory statements about AIDS, homosexuality, abortion, and Bill Clinton, including the following:

- "Perhaps AIDS Awareness should seek to educate us with their misdirected compassion for the degenerates who basically commit suicide through their behavior."
- "Heterosexual sex is very healthy in a loving martial relationship. Homosexual sex, however, kills."
- “One will be better off contracting AIDS than developing cancer, because those afflicted with the politically-correct disease will be getting all of the funding.”
- Clinton "supports the Freedom of Choice Act, which will allow women to mutilate and dismember their helpless children through their ninth month of pregnancy. Anyone who could consciously vote for such a murderer is obviously immoral."
- "Women even declare some right to control their bodies, neglecting the fact that in choosing abortion they are asserting a right to control another body, and a right to murder their own flesh and blood."

In response, Kloppenburg called Bradley’s comments “abhorrent and disturbing” and argued that Bradley’s alignment with conservative causes and Governor Scott Walker “speaks louder than any apology she tries to make.” Senator Tammy Baldwin described the comments as “hate speech,” while Governor Walker defended Bradley, stating that many people make mistakes when they are young and that he believed much of society probably held different views than they did in college. State legislators, including Lisa Subeck and Chris Taylor, called on Bradley to resign. Bradley apologized for the comments, stating, “To those offended by comments I made as a young college student, I apologize, and assure you that those comments are not reflective of my worldview,” and argued that the comments had no bearing on her work as a judge or on the issues in the campaign.

Judicial ethics was also a theme of the election, with Kloppenburg advocating for stronger recusal rules for judges, while Bradley did not take a position. Both candidates received criticism concerning ethical judgment. Kloppenburg received criticism for not recusing herself from a case in 2014, where one of the parties had spent money for her opponent in her previous race for the Wisconsin Supreme Court in 2011. Bradley's ethical judgment was called into question, when records were revealed into her representation of a former romantic partner in a child custodial case.

Outside groups spent heavily on the election, with groups supporting Bradley outspending Kloppenburg 4-to-1.

A large turnout for the election was expected, as it was held on the same day as the highly competitive Democratic and Republican presidential primaries. Hillary Clinton and Bernie Sanders, leading candidates in the Democratic presidential primary, urged supporters to vote for Kloppenburg, while Bradley appeared at campaign events with Republican candidate Ted Cruz.

=== Post-primary endorsements ===
Rebecca Bradley

Judicial officials

- Michael Gableman, Wisconsin Supreme Court justice
- Jon P. Wilcox, former Wisconsin Supreme Court justice (1992–2007)

Organizations

- Associated Builders and Contractors of Wisconsin
- Milwaukee Deputy Sheriffs Association
- NRA Political Victory Fund
- National Federation of Independent Business
- Wisconsin Fraternal Order of Police
JoAnne Kloppenburg

Federal officials

- Hillary Clinton, former U.S. Secretary of State (2009–2013), former U.S. senator from New York (2001–2009) (Democratic)
- Bernie Sanders, U.S. senator from Vermont (Independent)

Judicial officials

- Ann Walsh Bradley, Wisconsin Supreme Court justice
- Louis B. Butler, former Wisconsin Supreme Court justice (2004–2008)
- Joe Donald, Milwaukee County circuit court judge

Labor unions

- AFL-CIO

Newspapers

- The Capital Times
- The Milwaukee Courier
- The Shepherd Express
- Wisconsin State Journal

Organizations

- Professional Fire Fighters of Wisconsin
- Wisconsin Professional Police Association

=== Debates ===
2016 Wisconsin Supreme Court election debates
No.	Date	Host	Moderators	Link	Candidates	
P Participant A Absent N Non-invitee I Invitee W Withdrawn						
P Participant A Absent N Non-invitee I Invitee W Withdrawn					Bradley	Kloppenburg
1	March 9, 2016	Milwaukee Bar Association	Steve Walters	WisEye	P	P
2	March 15, 2016	WISN-TV; Marquette University Law School	Mike Gousha	YouTube	P	P
3	March 17, 2016	Wisconsin Public Television; Wisconsin Public Radio; Milwaukee Journal Sentinel	Frederica Freyberg; Shawn Johnson	YouTube	P	P
4	March 23, 2016	Rotary Club of Madison; WisconsinEye	Steve Walters	WisEye	P	P

=== Polling ===
Pollster	Dates administered	Sample size (Note: Key: A – all adults RV – registered voters LV – likely voters V – unclear)	Margin of error	Rebecca Bradley	JoAnne Kloppenburg	Other	Undecided
Marquette University Law School	March 24–28, 2016	957 (LV)	± 4.1%	41%	36%	5% (Note: "Neither" with 5%; "Refused" with <1%)	18%
Marquette University Law School	March 24–28, 2016	1,405 (RV)	± 3.3%	38%	32%	8% (Note: "Neither" with 8%; "Refused" with <1%)	22%
Marquette University Law School	February 18–21, 2016	802 (RV)	± 4.5%	30%	30%	9% (Note: "Neither" with 7%; "Don't plan to vote in April 5 election" with 1%; "Refused" with 1%)	31%

=== Results ===
Bradley was declared the winner on election night, defeating Kloppenburg by a 5-point margin. This maintained the 5–2 conservative split on the Court. During her victory speech, Bradley quoted Winston Churchill, proclaiming "There is nothing more exhilarating than being shot at without result.", referring to the controversy during the campaign over her previous college writings and relationships in her personal life. Democrats attributed Kloppenburg's loss due to the high Republican turnout in the concurrent presidential primary election and the spending advantage by groups supporting Bradley.

2016 Wisconsin Supreme Court election
Candidate	Votes	%
Rebecca Bradley (incumbent)	1,024,892	52.35%
JoAnne Kloppenburg	929,377	47.47%
Write-in	3,678	0.19%
Total votes	1,957,947	100.0%

== See also ==
- 2016 Wisconsin elections
  - 2016 Wisconsin Democratic presidential primary
  - 2016 Wisconsin Republican presidential primary
  - 2016 Milwaukee mayoral election
