= 2016 Wisconsin Republican presidential primary =

- April 5, 2016
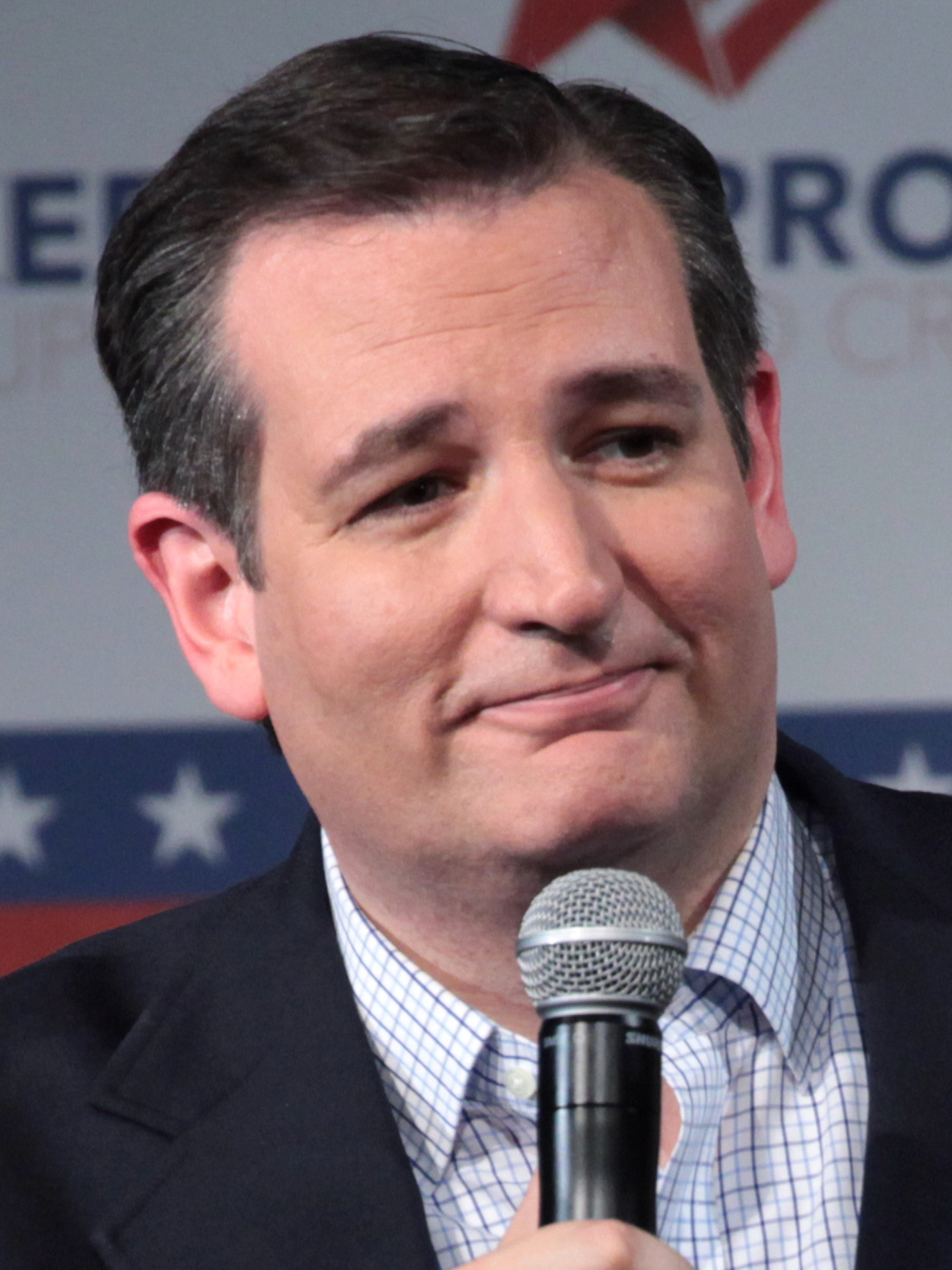

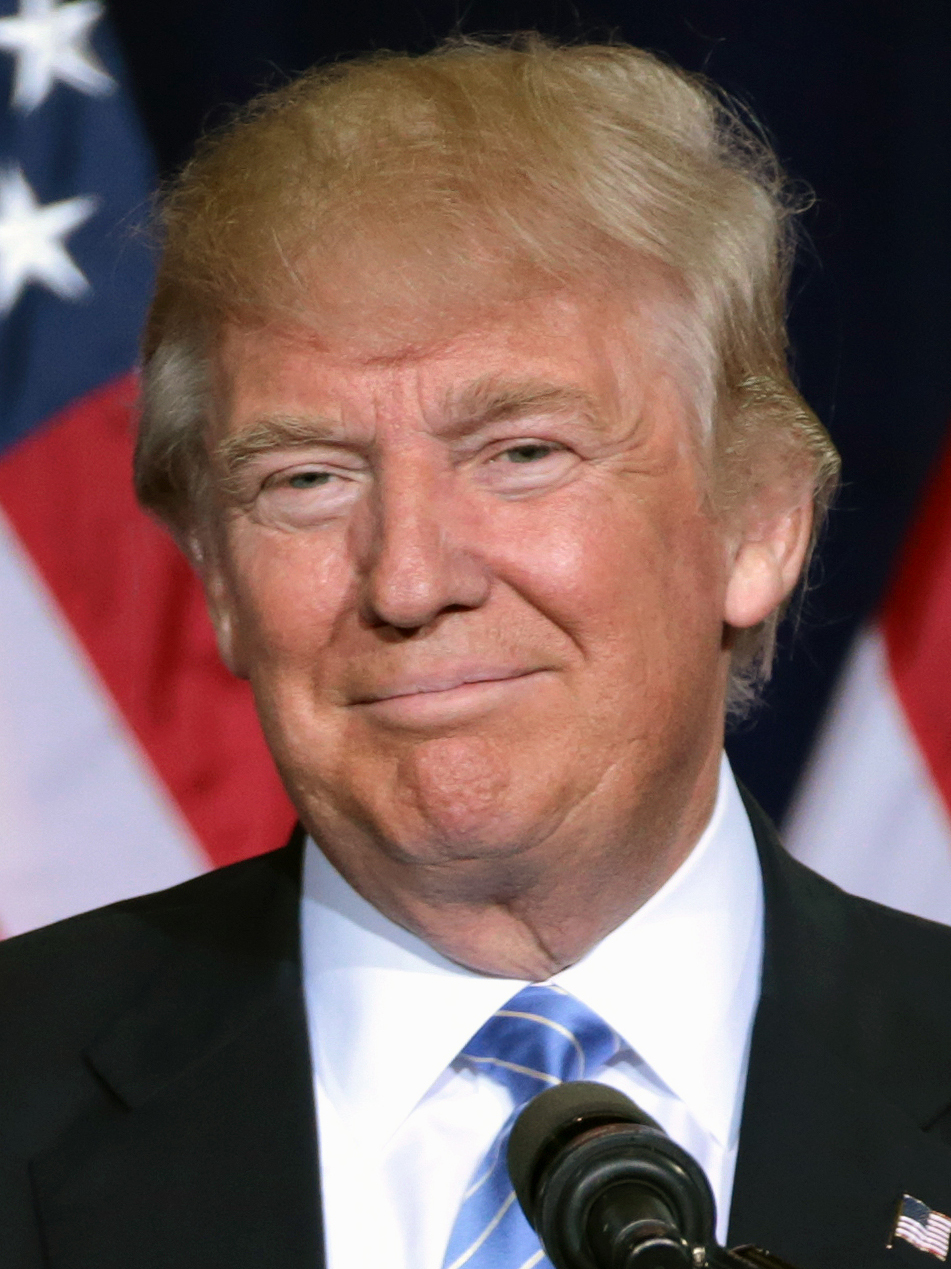

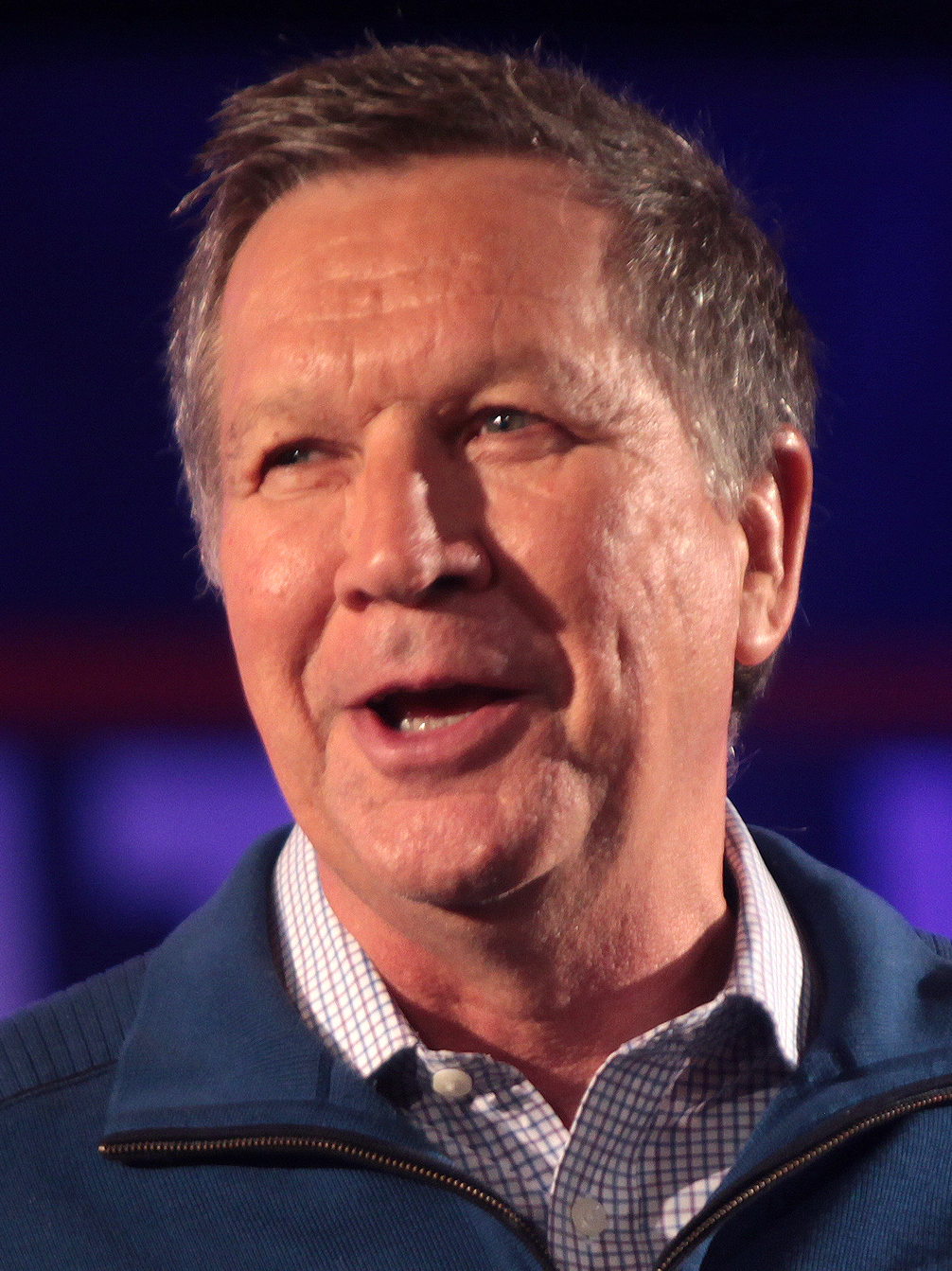
Candidate	Ted Cruz	Donald Trump	John Kasich
Home state	Texas	New York	Ohio
Delegate count	36	6	0
Popular vote	527,067	383,604	153,509
Percentage	48.25%	35.13%	14.02%

Ted Cruz 30-40% 40–50% 50–60% 60–70%	Donald Trump 30–40% 40–50% 50–60% 60–70%

The 2016 Wisconsin Republican presidential primary was held on April 5 in the U.S. state of Wisconsin as one of the Republican Party's primaries ahead of the 2016 presidential election. Texas senator Ted Cruz won the contest with 48%, ahead of nationwide frontrunner Donald Trump by 13 percentage points. Taking advantage of the state's two-level "winner takes all" provision, Cruz took 36 out of the 42 available delegates.

The Wisconsin Democratic primary, held on the same day in conjunction with the Republican primary, yielded a win for Bernie Sanders, who defeated nationwide frontrunner Hillary Clinton by 13 percentage points. With no other primaries being scheduled for that day by either party and just two weeks ahead of the important New York primary, the Wisconsin primary was in the national spotlight.

The two parties' primaries were held in conjunction with this year's Wisconsin judicial elections, where Wisconsin Supreme Court justice Rebecca Bradley was confirmed for a 10-year elected term, winning over Appeals Court judge JoAnne Kloppenburg.

Despite Ted Cruz's win, the eventual nominee, Donald Trump, went on to win the state on Election Day, held on November 8.

== Procedure ==
=== State primary procedure ===
As Wisconsin held an open primary, residents could choose freely which party's primary they wished to participate in, when showing up at the polls on election day, regardless of their official registration with either party or none. Polling stations were opened between 7 a.m. and 8 p.m. Central Time.

The two parties' primaries were held in conjunction with this year's Wisconsin judicial elections that included the election of the Wisconsin Supreme Court justice.

=== Republican nomination procedure ===
The Republican Party of Wisconsin pledges all of its 42 delegates to the 2016 Republican National Convention based on the popular vote at the primary election on the basis of a "Winner takes all" provision. However, only the 18 at-large delegates are awarded to the statewide plurality winner, while the 24 district delegates, three for each of the state's eight congressional districts, are given to the district-wide winner.

== Candidates ==
While twelve candidates appeared on the Republican primary ballot, only three of the candidates actively campaigned for the Wisconsin contest, after all other candidates had already suspended their campaigns.

=== Presidential debate in Milwaukee, November 2015 ===
The Republican Party held its fourth presidential debate on November 10, 2015, in Milwaukee, at the Milwaukee Theatre. Moderated by Neil Cavuto, Maria Bartiromo and Gerard Baker, the debate aired on the Fox Business Network and was sponsored by The Wall Street Journal. Eight candidates including Donald Trump, Ben Carson, Marco Rubio, Ted Cruz, Jeb Bush, Carly Fiorina, John Kasich, and Rand Paul, participated in the primetime debate that was mostly focused on jobs, taxes, and the general health of the U.S. economy, as well as on domestic and international policy issues. The accompanying undercard debate featured Chris Christie, Mike Huckabee, Rick Santorum, and Bobby Jindal who ended his campaign a week after the debate.

=== Campaigns ===
Social conservative Texas senator Ted Cruz, who enjoyed the endorsement of the united Republican Party establishment, including Wisconsin Governor Scott Walker, was expected to come out in front. Most polls saw him leading the current national frontrunner, populist New York businessman Donald Trump narrowly by single-digits. Trump maintained he would prevail in spite of the Republican establishment endorsing Cruz, and was "going to have a really, really big victory". With the Never Trump camp closing ranks around an expected Cruz victory in Wisconsin, the third candidate, fiscal conservative Ohio governor John Kasich, was not expected to be competitive in the more populous areas of Wisconsin, and shifted his focus on the more rural congressional districts in order to win at least some of the per-district delegates. Just a few days ahead of the primary, Trump openly asked Kasich to drop out of the race. Kasich was also heavily attacked in TV commercial by both frontrunners' SuperPACs.

=== Opinion polling ===
Poll source	Date	1st	2nd	3rd	Other
Primary results	April 5, 2016	Ted Cruz; 48.20%	Donald Trump; 35.02%	John Kasich; 14.10%	Marco Rubio 0.96%, Ben Carson 0.51%, Jeb Bush 0.28%, Rand Paul 0.23%, Mike Huckabee 0.13%, Chris Christie 0.11%, Carly Fiorina 0.07%, Rick Santorum 0.05%, Jim Gilmore 0.02%
ARG Margin of error: ± 5% Sample size: 400	April 1–3, 2016	Donald Trump; 42%	Ted Cruz; 32%	John Kasich 23%	Undecided 3%
Emerson College Margin of error: ± 4.1% Sample size: 549	March 30 - April 3, 2016	Ted Cruz; 40%	Donald Trump; 35%	John Kasich; 21%	Undecided 4%
CBS News/YouGov Margin of error: ± 5.7% Sample size: 675	March 29-April 1, 2016	Ted Cruz; 43%	Donald Trump; 37%	John Kasich; 18%	Other/Don't Know 2%
Fox Business News Margin of error: ± 3.5% Sample size: 742	March 28–30, 2016	Ted Cruz; 42%	Donald Trump; 32%	John Kasich; 19%	Other 1%, Don't Know 5%
Loras College Margin of error: ± 4.8% Sample size: 416	March 28–30, 2016	Ted Cruz; 38%	Donald Trump; 31%	John Kasich; 18%	Undecided 13%
Public Policy Polling Margin of error: ± 3.5% Sample size: 768	March 28–29, 2016	Ted Cruz; 38%	Donald Trump; 37%	John Kasich; 17%	Undecided 9%
Marquette University Margin of error: ± 5.8% Sample size: 471	March 24–28, 2016	Ted Cruz; 39.6%	Donald Trump; 30.4%	John Kasich; 21.4%	Someone Else 0.3%, Undecided 7.7%
Optimus Margin of error: ± 1.1% Sample size: 6182	March 20–24, 2016	Donald Trump; 29.4%	John Kasich; 27.1%	Ted Cruz; 25%	Undecided 18.6%
Emerson College Margin of error: ± 4.6% Sample size: 439	March 20–22, 2016	Ted Cruz; 36%	Donald Trump; 35%	John Kasich; 19%	Undecided 10%
Marquette University Margin of error: ± 7.5% Sample size: 297	February 18–21, 2016	Donald Trump; 30%	Marco Rubio; 20%	Ted Cruz; 19%	Ben Carson 8%, John Kasich 8%, Jeb Bush 3%, Undecided 10%
Marquette University Margin of error: ± 6.5% Sample size: 313	January 21–24, 2016	Donald Trump; 24%	Marco Rubio; 18%	Ted Cruz; 16%	Ben Carson 8%, Chris Christie 5%, Rand Paul 3%, Carly Fiorina 3%, Jeb Bush 2%, John Kasich 2%, Mike Huckabee 1%, Rick Santorum 0%, Undecided 17%
Marquette University Margin of error: ± 6.6% Sample size: 326	November 12–15, 2015	Ben Carson; 22%	Donald Trump; 19%	Marco Rubio; 19%	Ted Cruz 9%, Jeb Bush 6%, Carly Fiorina 5%, Chris Christie 4%, Rand Paul 1%, Mike Huckabee 1%, John Kasich 1%, George Pataki <0.5%, Jim Gilmore <0.5%, Someone else 0.6%, Undecided 9.8%
Marquette University Margin of error: ± 6.5% Sample size: 321	September 24–28, 2015	Donald Trump; 20.1%	Ben Carson; 16.2%	Marco Rubio; 14.4%	Carly Fiorina 10.8%, Jeb Bush 6.6%, Ted Cruz 5.1%, Rand Paul 4.5%, Mike Huckabee 3.4%, Chris Christie 3.1%, John Kasich 2.8%, Rick Santorum 1.2%, Bobby Jindal 0.5%, George Pataki 0.4%, Jim Gilmore 0.2%, Someone else 0.6%, Undecided 9.8%
Marquette University Margin of error: ± 6.6% Sample size: 334	August 13–16, 2015	Scott Walker; 25%	Ben Carson; 13%	Donald Trump; 9%	Ted Cruz 8%, Carly Fiorina 7%, Marco Rubio 7%, Jeb Bush 6%, Mike Huckabee 4%, Bobby Jindal 2%, Chris Christie 2%, Rand Paul 2%, Rick Perry 1%, John Kasich 1%, Jim Gilmore 1%, Rick Santorum 1%, George Pataki 0%, Lindsey Graham 0%
Marquette University Margin of error: ± 5.6% Sample size: 319	April 7–10, 2015	Scott Walker; 40%	Rand Paul; 10.3%	Jeb Bush; 7.9%	Ted Cruz 6%, Chris Christie 5.8%, Mike Huckabee 5.1%, Ben Carson 5%, Marco Rubio 3.8%, Bobby Jindal 2.3%, Rick Santorum 1.9%, Carly Fiorina 0.5%, Rick Perry 0.5%, Someone else 1.7%, Don't know 8.9%
Public Policy Polling Margin of error: ± 4.6% Sample size: 461	March 6–8, 2015	Scott Walker; 53%	Ben Carson; 12%	Jeb Bush; 8%	Rand Paul 6%, Marco Rubio 6%, Chris Christie 4%, Mike Huckabee 3%, Ted Cruz 2%, Rick Perry 1%, Undecided 5%
Public Policy Polling Margin of error: ± 4.3% Sample size: 522	April 17–20, 2014	Paul Ryan; 25%	Scott Walker; 21%	Chris Christie; 8%	Mike Huckabee 8%, Rand Paul 8%, Ted Cruz 7%, Jeb Bush 6%, Marco Rubio 6%, Bobby Jindal 3%, Someone else/Not sure 8%
Magellan Strategies Margin of error: ± ? Sample size: ?	April 14–15, 2014	Scott Walker; 37%	Rand Paul; 12%	Ted Cruz; 9%	Mike Huckabee 9%, Jeb Bush 8%, Marco Rubio 8%, Chris Christie 4%, John Kasich 1%, Undecided 12%
Marquette University Law School Margin of error: ± 5% Sample size: 337	October 21–27, 2013	Scott Walker; 28.9%	Paul Ryan; 24.6%	Marco Rubio; 9.3%	Chris Christie 8.6%, Rand Paul 8.4%, Ted Cruz 4.3%, Jeb Bush 2.4%, Someone else 4.2%, Don't know 8.9%
Public Policy Polling Margin of error: ± 4.6% Sample size: 447	September 13–16, 2013	Paul Ryan; 27%	Scott Walker; 14%	Chris Christie; 12%	Marco Rubio 10%, Ted Cruz 9%, Jeb Bush 8%, Rand Paul 8%, Bobby Jindal 3%, Rick Santorum 3%, Someone else/Not sure 5%
Public Policy Polling Margin of error: ± 4.6% Sample size: 447	September 13–16, 2013	Paul Ryan; 33%	Chris Christie; 14%	Jeb Bush; 11%	Rand Paul 11%, Ted Cruz 10%, Marco Rubio 9%, Rick Santorum 6%, Bobby Jindal 3%, Someone else/Not sure 5%
Public Policy Polling Margin of error: ± 4.6% Sample size: 447	September 13–16, 2013	Scott Walker; 37%	Chris Christie; 13%	Jeb Bush; 11%	Ted Cruz 10%, Rand Paul 10%, Marco Rubio 9%, Rick Santorum 4%, Bobby Jindal 2%, Someone else/Not sure 3%
Public Policy Polling Margin of error: ± 4.6% Sample size: 447	September 13–16, 2013	Paul Ryan; 47%	Scott Walker; 38%		Not sure 15%
Marquette University Law School Margin of error: ± 5.8% Sample size: 302	May 6–9, 2013	Paul Ryan; 27.1%	Marco Rubio; 21.2%	Scott Walker; 16.1%	Chris Christie 10.6%, Rand Paul 6.9%, Jeb Bush 4.6%, Bobby Jindal 0.8%, Someone Else 1.6%, Don't Know 10.5%
Public Policy Polling Margin of error: ± 3.8% Sample size: 679	February 21–24, 2013	Paul Ryan; 35%	Marco Rubio; 22%	Chris Christie; 10%	Rand Paul 8%, Mike Huckabee 7%, Jeb Bush 5%, Bobby Jindal 3%, Susana Martinez 1%, Rick Perry 1%, Someone Else/Undecided 8%
Public Policy Polling Margin of error: ± 3.8% Sample size: 679	February 21–24, 2013	Scott Walker; 33%	Marco Rubio; 27%	Chris Christie; 10%	Mike Huckabee 7%, Rand Paul 6%, Jeb Bush 5%, Bobby Jindal 3%, Susana Martinez 2%, Rick Perry 0%, Someone Else/Undecided 8%

== Results ==
With 48.25% of the statewide vote, Texas senator Ted Cruz distanced nationwide frontrunner Donald Trump by some 13%, thereby winning all 18 at-large delegates. Out of the eight congressional districts, Cruz won in six, therefore receiving another 18 district-wide delegates, while Donald Trump took home six district-wide delegates from western Wisconsin, where he won the 3rd and the 7th congressional districts.

Wisconsin Republican primary, April 5, 2016
Candidate	Votes	Percentage	Actual delegate count		
Candidate	Votes	Percentage	Bound	Unbound	Total
Ted Cruz	533,079	48.20%	36	0	36
Donald Trump	387,295	35.02%	6	0	6
John Kasich	155,902	14.10%	0	0	0
Marco Rubio (withdrawn)	10,591	0.96%	0	0	0
Ben Carson (withdrawn)	5,660	0.51%	0	0	0
Jeb Bush (withdrawn)	3,054	0.28%	0	0	0
Rand Paul (withdrawn)	2,519	0.23%	0	0	0
Uncommitted	2,281	0.21%	0	0	0
Mike Huckabee (withdrawn)	1,424	0.13%	0	0	0
Chris Christie (withdrawn)	1,191	0.11%	0	0	0
Carly Fiorina (withdrawn)	772	0.07%	0	0	0
Rick Santorum (withdrawn)	511	0.05%	0	0	0
Jim Gilmore (withdrawn)	245	0.02%	0	0	0
Victor Williams (write-in)	39	<0.01%	0	0	0
Unprojected delegates:			0	0	0
Total:	1,105,944	100.00%	42	0	42
Source: The Green Papers

== Reactions and aftermath ==
Cruz's unexpectedly large victory in Wisconsin was widely seen as a turning point for the Donald Trump campaign, making it less likely for Trump to win an outright majority of all national delegates, even if he should win a plurality of delegates. Without an outright majority in the 2016 Republican National Convention's first ballot, the delegates won by Trump would be able to switch to Cruz or another candidate in subsequent ballots, as they were pledged to support him only in the first ballot. Given the Republican establishment's pressure not to nominate Trump, many commentators expected Cruz to be better positioned in subsequent ballots. The theory of Trump's demise proved to be false. As the primary schedule moved to the Northeast, including his home state of New York, Trump increased his margin of victory and won almost all of the delegates. Finally, with his victory in the Indiana primary, Trump became the presumptive nominee.
