= 2016 Wisconsin Democratic presidential primary =

- April 5, 2016

Candidate	Bernie Sanders	Hillary Clinton
Home state	Vermont	New York
Delegate count	48	38
Popular vote	570,192	433,739
Percentage	56.59%	43.05%
- County results: Sanders: 50-60% 60-70% Clinton: 50-60% Precinct results: Bernie Sanders Hillary Clinton Tie No data

The 2016 Wisconsin Democratic presidential primary was held on April 5 in the U.S. state of Wisconsin as one of the Democratic Party's primaries ahead of the 2016 presidential election. Vermont senator Bernie Sanders won the contest with 56.59%, distancing nationwide frontrunner Hillary Clinton by about 14 percentage points.

The Wisconsin Republican primary, held on the same day in conjunction with the Democratic primary, yielded a win for Ted Cruz, who distanced nationwide frontrunner Donald Trump by 13%. With no other primaries being scheduled for that day by either party and just two weeks ahead of the important New York primary, the Wisconsin primary was in the national spotlight.

The two parties' primaries were held in conjunction with this year's Wisconsin judicial elections, where Wisconsin Supreme Court justice Rebecca Bradley was confirmed for a 10-year elected term, winning over Appeals Court judge JoAnne Kloppenburg.

Wisconsin provided a friendly setting for Sanders's brand of economic populism. Liberals made up two-thirds of the majority-white primary electorate, and the economy, followed by income inequality, were of top concern to voters, according to exit polls.

Clinton lost Wisconsin by a narrow margin of 0.77% in the general election, against Republican nominee Donald Trump.

== Procedure ==
=== State primary procedure ===
As Wisconsin held an open primary, residents could choose freely which party's primary they wished to participate in, when showing up at the polls on election day, regardless of their official registration with either party or none. Polling stations were opened between 7 a.m. and 8 p.m. Central Time.

The two parties' primaries were held in conjunction with this year's spring elections that included the election of the Wisconsin Supreme Court justice.

=== Democratic nomination procedure ===
The Democratic Party of Wisconsin pledges only 86 out of 96 delegates to the 2016 Democratic National Convention based on the popular vote at the primary election on the basis of proportional apportion. However, only the 18 at-large delegates and 10 pledged "Party Leaders and Elected Officials" (PLEOs) are apportioned according to the statewide vote, while the 57 district delegates are apportioned according to the vote within each of the state's eight congressional districts. The remaining ten Wisconsin delegates are unpledged "Party Leaders and Elected Officials" (PLEOs), or "Superdelegates", who may vote for whomever they wish at the party's upcoming National Convention.

== Candidates ==
While three candidates appeared on the Democratic primary ballot, only Bernie Sanders and Hillary Clinton actively campaigned for the Wisconsin contest, after Martin O'Malley had already suspended his campaign.

=== Presidential debate in Milwaukee, February 2016 ===
The Democratic Party held its sixth presidential debate on February 11, 2016 in Milwaukee, at the University of Wisconsin–Milwaukee. Moderated by PBS NewsHour anchors Gwen Ifill and Judy Woodruff, the debate aired on PBS and was simulcast by CNN. Participants were Hillary Clinton and Bernie Sanders.

=== Opinion polling ===
Poll source	Date	1st	2nd	3rd	Other
Official Primary results	April 5, 2016	Bernie Sanders; 56.6%	Hillary Clinton; 43.1%		Others / Uncommitted; 0.4%
ARG Margin of error: ± 5.0% Sample size: 400	April 1–3, 2016	Hillary Clinton; 49%	Bernie Sanders; 48%		Others / Undecided; 3%
Emerson Margin of error: ± 4.2% Sample size: 542	March 30 – April 3, 2016	Bernie Sanders; 51%	Hillary Clinton; 43%		Others / Undecided; 6%
CBS News/YouGov Margin of error: ± 3.7% Sample size: 653	March 29 – April 1, 2016	Bernie Sanders; 49%	Hillary Clinton; 47%		Others / Undecided; 4%
FOX Business Margin of error: ± 3.0% Sample size: 860	March 28–30, 2016	Bernie Sanders; 48%	Hillary Clinton; 43%		Others / Undecided; 10%
Loras College Margin of error: ± 4.8% Sample size: 416	March 28–29, 2016	Hillary Clinton; 47%	Bernie Sanders; 41%		Others / Undecided; 12%
Public Policy Polling Margin of error: ± 3.7% Sample size: 720	March 28–29, 2016	Bernie Sanders; 49%	Hillary Clinton; 43%		Others / Undecided; 8%
MULaw Poll Margin of error: ± 6.3% Sample size: 405	March 24–28, 2016	Bernie Sanders; 49%	Hillary Clinton; 45%		Others / Undecided; 6%
Emerson College Margin of error: ± 4.6% Sample size: 439	March 20–22, 2016	Hillary Clinton; 50%	Bernie Sanders; 44%		Others / Undecided; 6%
MULaw Poll Margin of error: ± 6.9% Sample size: 343	February 18–21, 2016	Bernie Sanders; 44%	Hillary Clinton; 43%		Others / Undecided; 13%
MULaw Poll Margin of error: ± 6.5% Sample size: 312	January 21–24, 2016	Hillary Clinton; 45%	Bernie Sanders; 43%	Martin O'Malley; 1%	Not Reported

Polls in 2015

Poll source	Date	1st	2nd	3rd	Other
Marquette Law School Margin of error: ± 6.1% Sample size: 374	November 12–15, 2015	Hillary Clinton; 50%	Bernie Sanders; 41%	Martin O'Malley; 2%	Undecided 7%
St. Norbert College Margin of error: ± 6% Sample size: ?	October 14–17, 2015	Hillary Clinton; 35%	Bernie Sanders; 33%	Joe Biden; 21%	Martin O'Malley 1%, Lincoln Chafee 0%, Jim Webb 0%, Not Sure 10%
St. Norbert College Margin of error: ± 6% Sample size: ?	October 14–17, 2015	Hillary Clinton; 47%	Bernie Sanders; 42%	–	Martin O'Malley 1%, Lincoln Chafee 1%, Jim Webb <1%, Not Sure 7%
Marquette University Margin of error: ± 5.9% Sample size: 394	September 24–28, 2015	Hillary Clinton; 42%	Bernie Sanders; 30%	Joe Biden; 17%	Martin O'Malley 1%, Lincoln Chafee 0%, Jim Webb 0%
Marquette University Margin of error: ± 6.1% Sample size: 396	August 13–16, 2015	Hillary Clinton; 44%	Bernie Sanders; 32%	Joe Biden; 12%	Lincoln Chafee 1%, Martin O'Malley 1%, Jim Webb 1%
Marquette University Margin of error: ± 5.1% Sample size: 391	April 7–10, 2015	Hillary Clinton; 58.2%	Elizabeth Warren; 14.3%	Joe Biden; 12%	Martin O'Malley 0.9%, Jim Webb 0.9%, Someone else 3.7%, Don't know 8.9%
Public Policy Polling Margin of error: ± 4.4% Sample size: 504	March 6–8, 2015	Hillary Clinton; 60%	Joe Biden; 14%	Elizabeth Warren; 12%	Bernie Sanders 5%, Martin O'Malley 1%, Jim Webb 1%, Other/Undecided 7%

Polls in 2014

Poll source	Date	1st	2nd	3rd	Other
Public Policy Polling Margin of error: ± 4.1% Sample size: 579	April 17–20, 2014	Hillary Clinton; 57%	Russ Feingold; 19%	Joe Biden; 8%	Elizabeth Warren 5%, Cory Booker 1%, Andrew Cuomo 1%, Mark Warner 1%, Kirsten Gillibrand 0%, Martin O'Malley 0%, Someone else/Not sure 8%

Polls in 2013

Poll source	Date	1st	2nd	3rd	Other
Marquette University Margin of error: ± 5% Sample size: 392	October 21–27, 2013	Hillary Clinton; 64%	Elizabeth Warren; 10.8%	Joe Biden; 10.6%	Andrew Cuomo 1.9%, Martin O'Malley 0.8%, Someone else 2.1%, Don't know 9.2%
Public Policy Polling Margin of error: ± 4.6% Sample size: 449	September 13–16, 2013	Hillary Clinton; 50%	Russ Feingold; 20%	Joe Biden; 11%	Elizabeth Warren 4%, Cory Booker 3%, Andrew Cuomo 2%, Kirsten Gillibrand 0%, Martin O'Malley 0%, Mark Warner 0%, Someone else/Not sure 9%
Marquette University Margin of error: ± 5.5% Sample size: 333	May 6–9, 2013	Hillary Clinton; 61.5%	Joe Biden; 13%	Elizabeth Warren; 4.8%	Andrew Cuomo 4.2%, Deval Patrick 1.5%, Martin O'Malley 1.1%, Mark Warner 0.7%, Someone else 1.5%, Don't Know 11%
Public Policy Polling Margin of error: Sample size:	February 21–24, 2013	Hillary Clinton; 50%	Russ Feingold; 25%	Joe Biden; 11%	Andrew Cuomo 3%, Elizabeth Warren 2%, Martin O'Malley 1%, Deval Patrick 1%, Brian Schweitzer 0%, Mark Warner 0%, Someone Else/Undecided 8%

== Results ==
Wisconsin Democratic primary, April 5, 2016
Candidate	Popular vote		Estimated delegates		
Candidate	Count	Percentage	Pledged	Unpledged	Total
Bernie Sanders	570,192	56.59%	48	1	49
Hillary Clinton	433,739	43.05%	38	9	47
Martin O'Malley (withdrawn)	1,732	0.17%			
Roque "Rocky" De La Fuente (write-in)	18	0.00%			
Scattering	431	0.04%			
Uncommitted	1,488	0.15%	0	0	0
Total	1,007,600	100%	86	10	96

=== Results by county ===
County	Clinton	%	Sanders	%
Adams	1,375	47.22%	1,515	52.03%
Ashland	1,248	36.00%	2,204	63.57%
Barron	2,572	46.11%	2,965	53.16%
Bayfield	1,488	36.09%	2,619	63.52%
Brown	16,701	42.40%	22,559	57.27%
Buffalo	825	41.46%	1,149	57.74%
Burnett	918	49.04%	936	50.00%
Calumet	3,028	42.86%	4,017	56.86%
Chippewa	4,022	43.77%	5,127	55.79%
Clark	1,473	42.67%	1,969	57.04%
Columbia	4,187	39.21%	6,460	60.49%
Crawford	1,146	41.61%	1,592	57.81%
Dane	61,405	37.27%	102,986	62.51%
Dodge	4,505	41.75%	6,249	57.91%
Door	2,943	46.06%	3,426	53.62%
Douglas	3,577	43.82%	4,512	55.27%
Dunn	2,421	35.95%	4,279	63.54%
Eau Claire	7,689	35.88%	13,674	63.81%
Florence	175	36.92%	293	61.81%
Fond du Lac	5,519	42.65%	7,385	57.07%
Forest	610	47.25%	667	51.67%
Grant	3,068	40.37%	4,491	59.10%
Green	2,766	38.59%	4,368	60.95%
Green Lake	871	42.89%	1,148	56.52%
Iowa	2,164	40.14%	3,202	59.40%
Iron	437	42.93%	563	55.30%
Jackson	1,294	40.64	1,872	58.79%
Jefferson	4,775	38.60%	7,555	61.07%
Juneau	1,355	42.21%	1,839	57.29%
Kenosha	10,897	42.49%	14,653	57.13%
Kewaunee	1,497	47.06%	1,667	52.40%
La Crosse	8,908	36.93%	15,156	62.84%
Lafayette	1,170	46.37%	1,331	52.75%
Langlade	1,192	44.83%	1,447	54.42%
Lincoln	1,732	41.33%	2,442	58.27%
Manitowoc	4,999	43.37%	6,458	56.03%
Marathon	8,061	40.66%	11,673	58.87%
Marinette	2,580	48.59%	2,698	50.81%
Marquette	994	42.62%	1,321	56.56%
Menominee	204	36.36%	355	63.28%
Milwaukee	100,798	51.68%	93,688	48.02%
Monroe	2,269	38.86%	3,539	60.61%
Oconto	2,422	47.99%	2,590	51.32%
Oneida	2,500	39.40%	3,813	60.09%
Outagamie	11,228	39.62%	17,021	60.07%
Ozaukee	6,587	48.75%	6,897	51.04%
Pepin	435	43.54%	561	56.16%
Pierce	2,343	41.82%	3,208	57.27%
Polk	2,165	46.21%	2,476	52.85%
Portage	5,088	35.08%	9,351	64.46%
Price	862	37.56%	1,418	61.79%
Racine	14,111	48.84%	14,681	50.82%
Richland	1,276	41.55%	1,786	58.16%
Rock	11,262	39.20%	17,360	60.42%
Rusk	816	42.52%	1,092	56.90%
St. Croix	4,895	45.90%	5,679	53.25%
Sauk	4,527	38.48%	7,203	61.22%
Sawyer	976	36.86%	1,654	62.46%
Shawano	2,117	41.19%	3,303	58.44%
Sheboygan	7,145	44.13%	8,952	55.30%
Taylor	852	39.68%	1,279	59.57%
Trempealeau	1,989	44.76%	2,430	54.68%
Vernon	1,936	35.60%	3,481	64.01%
Vilas	1,414	36.36%	2,147	60.09%
Walworth	5,188	37.96%	8,426	61.65%
Washburn	1,058	42.32%	1,419	56.76%
Washington	6,388	45.24%	7,690	54.46%
Waukesha	24,835	48.28%	26,442	51.40%
Waupaca	2,585	39.68%	3,894	59.77%
Waushara	1,241	43.45%	1,600	56.02%
Winnebago	11,212	38.44%	17,854	61.22%
Wood	4,428	39.46%	6,756	60.20%
Total	433,739	43.05%	570,192	56.59%

=== Detailed results per congressional district ===
Detailed results for the Wisconsin Democratic primary, April 5, 2016
District	Total		Bernie Sanders		Hillary Clinton	
District	Votes	Delegates	Votes	Delegates	Votes	Delegates
1st district	104,747	6	57,327	3	47,420	3
2nd district	204,897	11	127,466	7	77,431	4
3rd district	117,465	7	72,043	4	45,422	3
4th district	144,659	10	68,255	5	76,404	5
5th district	100,823	5	54,809	3	46,014	2
6th district	105,348	6	60,490	3	44,858	3
7th district	98,860	6	56,683	3	42,177	3
8th district	107,841	6	61,965	3	45,876	3
At-large delegates	1,002,036	19	567,865	11	434,171	8
Pledged PLEOs	1,002,036	10	567,865	6	434,171	4
Total	1,002,036	86	567,865	48	434,171	38

== Analysis ==
Liberals & Conservatives Line Up for Bernie Sanders’ Wisconsin Rally

Bernie Sanders scored a large victory in Wisconsin, a largely liberal and big manufacturing state. He was bolstered by a 73-26 showing among younger voters, a 64-35 showing among men, a 72-28 showing among self-identified Independents, and a 59-40 showing among white voters who comprised 83% of the electorate in the Cheese State. Sanders also won women 50–49, but lost African American voters to Clinton, 69–31. Sanders swept all income and educational attainment levels in Wisconsin.

Sanders won unions 54–46, a key demographic in the industrial Rust Belt.

Sanders swept all counties in Wisconsin but one. He was victorious in the southeast 55–45, in the southwest 62–38, and in rural northeastern and northwestern Wisconsin 57–42. He carried the major cities of Madison, which has a younger electorate, as well as Eau Claire, Green Bay, Oshkosh, and Kenosha. Clinton won in Milwaukee 51–48, likely thanks to her ardent African-American support.
