= 2000 Wisconsin elections =

- April 4, 2000; November 7, 2000

The 2000 Wisconsin Fall General Election was held in the U.S. state of Wisconsin on November 7, 2000. One of Wisconsin's U.S. Senate seats was up for election, as well as Wisconsin's nine seats in the United States House of Representatives, the sixteen even-numbered seats in the Wisconsin State Senate, and all 99 seats in the Wisconsin State Assembly. Voters also chose eleven electors to represent them in the Electoral College, which then participated in selecting the president of the United States. The 2000 Fall Partisan Primary was held on September 12, 2000.

In the Fall general election, the Democratic presidential candidate, Vice President Al Gore, narrowly won Wisconsin's eleven electoral votes, defeating Texas Governor George W. Bush by a mere 5,708 votes. All nine of Wisconsin's incumbent members of Congress were reelected. Democrats gained one seat in the Wisconsin Senate; Republicans gained one seat in the Wisconsin Assembly.

The 2000 Wisconsin Spring Election was held April 4, 2000. This election featured a contested election for Wisconsin Supreme Court and the Presidential preference primary for both major political parties, as well as various nonpartisan local and judicial offices. The 2000 Wisconsin Spring Primary was held on February 15, 2000.

Wisconsin Republicans celebrated the results of the April election with the victory of their preferred candidate in the Wisconsin Supreme Court election. The Presidential preference primary was not seriously contested on either the Democratic or Republican side, as most candidates had already dropped out before Wisconsin's vote.

== Federal offices ==
=== U.S. President ===
Incumbent Democratic President Bill Clinton was term-limited and was not a candidate for reelection. In Wisconsin, voters chose Clinton's vice president, Al Gore, over Texas Governor George W. Bush. Vice President Gore received Wisconsin's eleven electoral votes, but did not win the national electoral vote.

==== Results ====
United States Presidential Election in Wisconsin, 2000
Party	Candidate	Votes	%	±%
General Election, November 7, 2000
Democratic	Al Gore / Joe Lieberman	1,242,987	47.83%	−1.03%
Republican	George W. Bush / Dick Cheney	1,237,279	47.61%	+9.09%
Green	Ralph Nader / Winona LaDuke	94,070	3.62%	+2.31%
Reform	Pat Buchanan / Ezola Foster	11,471	0.44%	−9.92%
Libertarian	Harry Browne / Art Olivier	6,640	0.26%	−0.11%
Constitution	Howard Phillips / J. Curtis Frazier	2,042	0.08%	−0.32%
Workers World	Monica Moorehead / Gloria La Riva	1,063	0.04%	−0.02%
Independent	John Hagelin / Nat Goldhaber	853	0.03%	−0.03%
Socialist Workers	James Harris / Margaret Trowe	306	0.01%	−0.01%
	Scattering	1,896	0.07%	
Plurality		5,708	0.22%	-10.12%
Total votes		2,598,607	100.0%	+18.45%
Democratic hold				

=== U.S. Senate ===
Incumbent Democratic U.S. Senator Herb Kohl was reelected to a third six-year term, defeating Republican John Gillespie.

United States Senate Election in Wisconsin, 2000
Party	Candidate	Votes	%	±%
General Election, November 7, 2000
Democratic	Herb Kohl (incumbent)	1,563,238	61.54%	+3.23%
Republican	John Gillespie	940,744	37.04%	−3.66%
Libertarian	Tim Peterson	21,348	0.84%	−0.15%
Independent	Eugene A. Hem	9,555	0.38%	
Constitution	Robert R. Raymond	4,296	0.17%	
	Scattering	902	0.04%	
Plurality		622,494	24.51%	+6.89%
Total votes		2,540,083	100.0%	+62.30%
Democratic hold				

=== U.S. House ===
District	Incumbent		Candidates	Results
District	Member	First elected	Candidates	Results
Wisconsin 1	Paul Ryan	1998	✓ Paul Ryan (Rep) 66.57%; Jeffrey Thomas (Dem) 33.32%	Incumbent re-elected.
Wisconsin 2	Tammy Baldwin	1998	✓ Tammy Baldwin (Dem) 51.36%; John Sharpless (Rep) 48.57%	Incumbent re-elected.
Wisconsin 3	Ron Kind	1996	✓ Ron Kind (Dem) 63.74%; Susan Tully (Rep) 35.91%	Incumbent re-elected.
Wisconsin 4	Jerry Kleczka	1984	✓ Jerry Kleczka (Dem) 60.77%; Tim Riener (Rep) 37.81%; Nikola Rajnovic (Lib) 1.38%	Incumbent re-elected.
Wisconsin 5	Tom Barrett	1992	✓ Tom Barrett (Dem) 77.68%; Jonathan Smith (Republican) 22.02%	Incumbent re-elected.
Wisconsin 6	Tom Petri	1979 (Special)	✓ Tom Petri (Rep) 65.02%; Dan Flaherty (Dem) 34.88%	Incumbent re-elected.
Wisconsin 7	Dave Obey	1969 (Special)	✓ Dave Obey (Dem) 63.27%; Sean Cronin (Rep) 36.66%	Incumbent re-elected.
Wisconsin 8	Mark Andrew Green	1998	✓ Mark Andrew Green (Rep) 74.62%; Dean Reich (Dem) 25.27%	Incumbent re-elected.
Wisconsin 9	Jim Sensenbrenner	1978	✓ Jim Sensenbrenner (Rep) 74.04%; Mike Clawson (Dem) 25.88%	Incumbent re-elected.

== State offices ==
=== Legislature ===
==== State Senate ====
The 16 even-numbered seats in the Wisconsin State Senate were up for election in 2000. Each party controlled 8 seats up for election in 2000, with Democrats holding a 1-seat majority in the full Senate, 17–16. Republicans picked up one Democrat-held seat in the 2000 general election, but Democrats picked up two previously Republican-held seats, for a net result of the Democratic Party gaining 1 seat and increasing their majority to 18–15.

===== Summary =====
Seats	Party (majority caucus shading)		Vacant	Total
Seats	Democratic	Republican		Total
Total after last election (1998)	18	15	33	0
Total before this election	17	16	33	0
Up for election	8	8	16	
This election	9	7	16	
Total after this election	18	15	33	0
Change in total	▲1	▼1	Steady	Steady

==== State Assembly ====
All 99 seats in the Wisconsin State Assembly were up for election in 2000. Republicans gained 1 seat in the 2000 general election, increasing their majority to 56–43.

===== Summary =====
Seats	Party (majority caucus shading)		Vacant	Total
Seats	Democratic	Republican		Total
Total after last election (1998)	44	55	99	0
Total before this election	44	55	99	0
Total after this election	43	56	99	0
Change in total	▼1	▲1	Steady	Steady

=== Judiciary ===
==== State Supreme Court ====
In the Supreme Court election (held during the spring elections), incumbent Wisconsin Supreme Court Justice Diane S. Sykes defeated Milwaukee municipal court judge Louis B. Butler in the April general election. Justice Sykes had been appointed to the court in 1999 by Governor Tommy Thompson, to replace Justice Donald W. Steinmetz, who had retired. Justice Steinmetz's term was already set to expire in 2000, thus the election did not need to be scheduled any earlier than it otherwise would have been.

Wisconsin Supreme Court Election, 2000
Party	Candidate	Votes	%	±%
General Election, April 4, 2000
Nonpartisan	Diane S. Sykes (incumbent)	535,805	65.52%	
Nonpartisan	Louis B. Butler	281,048	34.37%	
	Scattering	895	0.11%	
Plurality		254,757	31.15%	+27.43%
Total votes		817,748	100.0%	+19.27%

==== State Court of Appeals ====
Three seats of the Wisconsin Court of Appeals were up for election in 2000. None of the elections was contested.

- In District I, Judge Ralph Adam Fine was elected to his third six-year term.
- In District II, Judge Richard S. Brown was elected to his fourth six-year term.
- In District IV, Judge Margaret J. Vergeront was elected to her second six-year term.

==== State Circuit Courts ====
Forty nine of the state's 241 circuit court seats were up for election in 2000. One of those seats—in Waupaca County—was newly created by the 1999 budget act passed by the Wisconsin Legislature. Eight of the seats were contested. Only one incumbent judge was defeated seeking re-election, Michael G. Grzeca—an appointee of Governor Tommy Thompson in the Brown County Circuit.

Circuit	Branch	Incumbent	Elected			Defeated			Defeated in Primary
Circuit	Branch	Incumbent	Name	Votes	%	Name	Votes	%	Name(s)
Ashland		Robert E. Eaton	Robert E. Eaton	1,782	99.78%				
Barron	2	Edward R. Brunner	Edward R. Brunner	5,541	99.87%				
Brown	2	Michael G. Grzeca	Mark A. Warpinski	26,058	68.40%	Michael G. Grzeca	12,002	31.51%	
Clark		Jon M. Counsell	Jon M. Counsell	4,903	66.24%	Charles S. Senn	2,492	33.67%	Darwin L. Zwieg; Frank Vazquez
Dane	3	John C. Albert	John C. Albert	48,077	99.57%				
Dane	8	Patrick J. Fiedler	Patrick J. Fiedler	48,853	99.56%				
Dane	9	Gerald C. Nichol	Gerald C. Nichol	49,139	99.66%				
Dane	12	David T. Flanagan	David T. Flanagan	47,869	99.65%				
Dane	17	Paul B. Higginbotham	Paul B. Higginbotham	49,239	99.66%				
Door	1	John D. Koehn	D. Todd Ehlers	4,334	51.43%	Philip L. Johnson	4,087	48.50%	
Door	2	Peter C. Diltz	Peter C. Diltz	7,110	99.45%				
Eau Claire	1	Thomas H. Barland	Lisa K. Stark	9,217	59.69%	Michael D. O'Brien	6,197	40.13%	Mike O'Brien
Eau Claire	3	William M. Gabler	William M. Gabler	11,833	99.54%				
Eau Claire	4	Benjamin D. Proctor	Benjamin D. Proctor	12,208	99.57%				
Eau Claire	5	Paul J. Lenz	Paul J. Lenz	11,925	99.61%				
Kenosha	7	S. Michael Wilk	S. Michael Wilk	12,488	99.70%				
Milwaukee	4	Mel Flanagan	Mel Flanagan	115,045	99.21%				
Milwaukee	6	Kitty Brennan	Kitty Brennan	116,005	99.25%				
Milwaukee	8	William Sosnay	William Sosnay	112,081	99.26%				
Milwaukee	13	Victor Manian	Victor Manian	116,145	99.34%				
Milwaukee	20	Dennis P. Moroney	Dennis P. Moroney	112,357	99.34%				
Milwaukee	23	Elsa C. Lamelas	Elsa C. Lamelas	111,652	99.29%				
Milwaukee	28	Thomas R. Cooper	Thomas R. Cooper	111,772	99.38%				
Milwaukee	35	Lee Wells	Lee Wells	112,271	99.41%				
Milwaukee	38	Jeffrey A. Wagner	Jeffrey A. Wagner	115,872	99.34%				
Milwaukee	39	Michael Malmstadt	Michael Malmstadt	113,139	99.36%				
Milwaukee	43	Marshall B. Murray	Marshall B. Murray	110,440	99.38%				
Milwaukee	46	Bonnie L. Gordon	Bonnie L. Gordon	110,560	99.34%				
Oneida	2	Mark A. Mangerson	Mark A. Mangerson	5,895	99.63%				
Outagamie	4	Harold V. Froehlich	Harold V. Froehlich	17,832	99.84%				
Outagamie	5	Dee R. Dyer	Dee R. Dyer	17,916	99.88%				
Outagamie	7	John A. Des Jardins	John A. Des Jardins	18,032	99.81%				
Portage	3	Thomas T. Flugaur	Thomas T. Flugaur	7,170	99.82%				
Racine	8	Dennis J. Flynn	Dennis J. Flynn	20,913	99.52%				
Racine	10	Richard J. Kreul	Richard J. Kreul	19,694	99.59%				
Rock	7	James E. Welker	James E. Welker	14,334	99.07%				
St. Croix	3	Scott R. Needham	Scott R. Needham	5,414	99.96%				
Sauk	1	Patrick J. Taggart	Patrick J. Taggart	6,690	99.58%				
Sauk	3	Virginia A. Wolfe	Guy D. Reynolds	5,443	62.75%	Patricia Barrett	3,222	37.15%	Joseph J. Screnock; David McFarlane; Randall M. Holtz; David McFarlane
Sheboygan	5	James J. Bolgert	James J. Bolgert	16,290	99.82%				
Walworth	1	Robert J. Kennedy	Robert J. Kennedy	7,698	50.31%	Henry A. Sibbing	7,601	49.68%	
Washington	3	David Resheske	David Resheske	13,058	99.59%				
Washington	4	Leo F. Schlaefer	Andrew T. Gonring	12,964	99.46%				
Waukesha	11	Robert G. Mawdsley	Robert G. Mawdsley	41,745	99.55%				
Waukesha	12	Kathryn W. Foster	Kathryn W. Foster	42,017	99.51%				
Waupaca	3	New seat	Raymond S. Huber	6,042	56.24%	John P. Snider	4,701	43.75%	Steven L. Toney
Winnebago	1	William E. Crane	Thomas J. Gritton	11,900	56.78%	Frank Slattery	9,033	43.10%	
Winnebago	2	Robert A. Haase	Robert A. Haase	17,309	99.51%				
Winnebago	4	Robert A. Hawley	Robert A. Hawley	17,228	99.43%				

== Local ==
=== Douglas County ===
==== Mayor ====
Incumbent mayor of Superior, Wisconsin, Margaret Ciccone, was successfully recalled, being replaced by her opponent from 1999, Richard Van Rossem.

=== Milwaukee County ===
==== Mayor ====
Incumbent Mayor John Norquist was reelected to a fourth four-year term, defeating businessman George Watts.

=== Monroe County ===
Ed Thompson, brother of incumbent Governor Tommy Thompson, was elected Mayor of Tomah, Wisconsin, defeating incumbent Bud Johnson.
