= 2016 Wisconsin elections =

- April 5, 2016; November 8, 2016

The 2016 Wisconsin Fall General Election was held in the U.S. state of Wisconsin on November 8, 2016. One of Wisconsin's U.S. Senate seats and all eight seats in the United States House of Representatives were up for election, as well as half of the Wisconsin Senate seats and all 99 Wisconsin State Assembly seats. Voters also chose ten electors to represent them in the Electoral College, which then participated in selecting the 45th president of the United States. The 2016 Fall Partisan Primary was held on August 9, 2016.

The Wisconsin Republican Party made large gains in the 2016 election. Businessman and Republican presidential nominee Donald Trump won Wisconsin in an upset, becoming the first Republican to win the state since 1984. Additionally, the state GOP had a strong showing in the State Legislature, building their largest majorities since 1957, and Republican senator Ron Johnson defeated Russ Feingold a second time for a second term. This put Walker and the Wisconsin GOP in a strong position.

The 2016 Wisconsin Spring Election was held April 5, 2016. This election featured a contested race for Wisconsin Supreme Court, with Republicans' preferred candidate, recently appointed justice Rebecca Bradley, winning a ten-year term. The Spring election also saw various other judicial and local elections, including contested county executive and mayoral races in Wisconsin's largest city and county, Milwaukee. The 2016 Wisconsin Spring Primary was held February 17, 2016.

== Federal ==
=== Senate ===
In a rematch of the 2010 election, first term incumbent Republican Ron Johnson ran against former Democratic U.S. Senator Russ Feingold. Johnson defeated Feingold in the general election with 50.2% of the vote.

=== House of Representatives ===
All of Wisconsin's eight United States House of Representatives seats were up for election in 2016. Party composition remained unchanged after the general election.

District	Incumbent	Elected	Defeated	Democratic		Republican		Others		Total		Result
District	Incumbent	Elected	Defeated	Votes	%	Votes	%	Votes	%	Votes	%	Result
District 1	Paul Ryan	Paul Ryan	Ryan Solen (D); Jason Lebeck (Lib)	107,003	30.21%	230,072	64.95%	17,170	4.85%	354,245	12.77%	Republican Hold
District 2	Mark Pocan	Mark Pocan	Peter Theron (R)	273,537	68.72%	124,044	31.16%	479	0.12%	398,060	14.35%	Democratic Hold
District 3	Ron Kind	Ron Kind	Ryan Peterson (Ind)	257,401	98.86%	0	0.0%	2,969	1.14%	260,370	9.39%	Democratic Hold
District 4	Gwen Moore	Gwen Moore	Andy Craig (Lib); Robert R. Raymond (Ind)	220,181	76.74%	0	0.0%	66,728	23.26%	286,909	10.34%	Democratic Hold
District 5	Jim Sensenbrenner	Jim Sensenbrenner	Khary Penebaker (D); John Arndt (Lib)	114,477	29.29%	260,706	66.70%	15,661	4.01%	390,844	14.09%	Republican Hold
District 6	Glenn Grothman	Glenn Grothman	Sarah Lloyd (D); Jeff Dahlke (Ind)	133,072	37.26%	204,147	57.15%	19,964	5.59%	357,183	12.88%	Republican Hold
District 7	Sean Duffy	Sean Duffy	Mary Hoeft (D)	138,643	38.27%	223,418	61.67%	210	0.06%	362,271	13.06%	Republican Hold
District 8	Reid Ribble	Mike Gallagher	Tom Nelson (D); Wendy Gribben (Green)	135,682	37.30%	227,892	62.65%	206	0.06%	363,780	13.12%	Republican Hold
Total				1,379,996	49.75%	1,270,279	45.80%	123,387	4.45%	2,773,662	100.00%	

== State ==
=== Legislature ===
==== State Senate ====
The 16 even-numbered districts out of 33 seats in the Wisconsin Senate were up for election in 2016. Nine of these seats were held by Republicans and seven were held by Democrats. Prior to the election, Republicans controlled the chamber with a 19 to 14 majority, but they gained a seat in the election.

Senatorial district	Incumbent			This race		Results
District	Senator	Party	First elected	Incumbent Status	Candidates	Winner
2	Robert Cowles	Republican	1987	Running	Robert Cowles (Republican); John Powers (Democratic)	Robert Cowles; 65%
4	Lena Taylor	Democrat	2005	Running	Lena Taylor (Democrat)	Lena Taylor; 100%
6	Nikiya Harris	Democrat	2013	Not Running	La Tonya Johnson (Democrat)	LaTonya Johnson; 100%
8	Alberta Darling	Republican	1993	Running	Alberta Darling (Republican)	Alberta Darling; 100%
10	Sheila Harsdorf	Republican	2001	Running	Sheila Harsdorf (Republican); Diane Odeen (Democrat)	Sheila Harsdorf; 63%
12	Tom Tiffany	Republican	2013	Running	Tom Tiffany (Republican); Bryan Van Stippen (Democrat)	Tom Tiffany; 63%
14	Luther Olsen	Republican	2004	Running	Luther Olsen (Republican); Brian Smith (Democrat)	Luther Olsen; 57%
16	Mark F. Miller	Democrat	2005	Running	Mark Miller (Democrat)	Mark Miller; 100%
18	Rick Gudex	Republican	2013	Not Running	Dan Feyen (Republican); Mark Harris (Democrat)	Dan Feyen; 56%
20	Duey Stroebel	Republican	2015	Running	Duey Stroebel (Republican)	Duey Stroebel; 100%
22	Robert Wirch	Democrat	1997	Running	Robert Wirch (Democrat)	Robert Wirch; 100%
24	Julie Lassa	Democrat	2003	Running	Patrick Testin (Republican); Julie Lassa (Democrat)	Patrick Testin; 52%
26	Fred Risser	Democrat	1962	Running	Fred Risser (Democrat)	Fred Risser; 100%
28	Mary Lazich	Republican	1998	Not Running	Dave Craig (Republican)	Dave Craig; 100%
30	Dave Hansen	Democrat	2001	Running	Dave Hansen (Democratic); Eric Wimberger (Republican)	Dave Hansen; 51%
32	Jennifer Shilling	Democrat	2011	Running	Jennifer Shilling (Democrat); Dan Kapanke (Republican); Chip DeNure (independent)	Jennifer Shilling; 49%

==== State Assembly ====
All 99 seats of the Wisconsin State Assembly were up for election in November. Nine Assemblymen (6 Republicans, 3 Democrats) did not seek re-election.

Affiliation	Party (Shading indicates majority caucus)		Total	
Affiliation	Republican	Democratic	Total	Vacant
Before 2016 elections	63	36	99	0
Latest voting share	64%	36%		
After 2016 elections	64	35	99	0
Latest voting share	65%	35%		

=== Judiciary ===
==== State Supreme Court ====
Incumbent Wisconsin Supreme Court Justice Rebecca Bradley defeated Judge JoAnne Kloppenburg of the Wisconsin Court of Appeals in the April general election. Justice Bradley had been appointed to the court in 2015 by Governor Scott Walker, to replace Justice N. Patrick Crooks, who had died in office. Justice Crooks' term was already set to expire in 2016, thus the election did not need to be scheduled any earlier than it was already set to be held before Crooks's death.

Though Wisconsin's judicial elections are officially nonpartisan, Bradley's victory was seen as a win for the Republican Party, as she supported a judicial philosophy in line with that of federal conservative judges like Samuel Alito and Clarence Thomas. During the election her primary backers were Republican-aligned interest groups such as the NRA Political Victory Fund and Wisconsin Right to Life. Justice Crooks, her predecessor, was seen as a swing vote on the court, so his replacement by the conservative Bradley was seen as a net gain for the conservative bloc on the court.

2016 Wisconsin Supreme Court election
Primary election
Party	Candidate	Votes	%
Nonpartisan	Rebecca Bradley (incumbent)	252,932	44.61%
Nonpartisan	JoAnne Kloppenburg	244,729	43.16%
Nonpartisan	M. Joseph Donald	68,746	12.12%
Write-in		631	0.11%
Total votes		567,038	100.0%
General election
Nonpartisan	Rebecca Bradley (incumbent)	1,024,892	52.35%
Nonpartisan	JoAnne Kloppenburg	929,377	47.47%
Write-in		3,678	0.19%
Total votes		1,957,947	100.0%

==== State Court of Appeals ====
All four districts of the Wisconsin Court of Appeals had a seat up for election in 2016. None of the races were contested.

- In District I, Judge Joan F. Kessler was elected to her third term without opposition.
- In District II, Judge Paul F. Reilly was elected to his second term without opposition.
- In District III, Judge Thomas Hruz was elected to his first full term, after being appointed to the court by Governor Scott Walker in 2014.
- In District IV, Judge Brian Blanchard was elected to his second term without opposition.

==== State Circuit Courts ====
Forty of the state's 249 circuit court seats were up for election in 2016. Ten of those seats were contested. Three incumbent judges were defeated—Milwaukee County judges Paul Rifelj and Michelle Ackerman Havas, and Eau Claire County judge Brian H. Wright. All three defeated judges had been appointed by Governor Scott Walker.

Circuit	Branch	Incumbent	Elected			Defeated			Defeated in Primary
Circuit	Branch	Incumbent	Name	Votes	%	Name	Votes	%	Name(s)
Barron	1	James C. Babler	James C. Babler	12,364	99.66%				
Crawford		James P. Czajkowski	Lynn Marie Rider	4,327	99.63%				
Dane	3	Jim Troupis	Valerie L. Bailey-Rihn	132,270	99.10%				
Dane	4	Amy Smith	Everett Mitchell	132,939	99.14%				
Dane	5	Nicholas J. McNamara	Nicholas J. McNamara	131,068	99.19%				
Dane	14	C. William Foust	John D. Hyland	130,198	99.23%				
Dane	15	Stephen Ehlke	Stephen Ehlke	130,754	99.27%				
Dane	17	Peter C. Anderson	Peter C. Anderson	129,643	99.23%				
Eau Claire	1	Brian H. Wright	John F. Manydeeds	18,850	55.35%	Brian H. Wright	15,132	44.43%	
Fond du Lac	2	Peter L. Grimm	Peter L. Grimm	25,290	100.00%				
Fond du Lac	4	Gary R. Sharpe	Gary R. Sharpe	25,020	100.00%				
Iowa		William D. Dyke	Margaret M. Koehler	4,546	51.21%	Timothy B. McKinley	4,315	48.61%	Larry Nelson; Tim Angel
Juneau	1	John Pier Roemer	John Pier Roemer	6,384	99.72%				
Kewaunee		Dennis J. Mleziva	Keith A. Mehn	4,096	51.66%	Jeffrey Ronald Wisnicky	3,832	48.34%	Andrew Naze
Lincoln	1	Jay R. Tlusty	Jay R. Tlusty	7,844	99.27%				
Marathon	2	Greg Huber	Greg Huber	37,240	99.56%				
Milwaukee	5	Mary M. Kuhnmuench	Mary M. Kuhnmuench	171,093	98.72%				
Milwaukee	14	Christopher R. Foley	Christopher R. Foley	175,825	98.91%				
Milwaukee	25	Stephanie Rothstein	Stephanie Rothstein	168,070	98.83%				
Milwaukee	31	Paul Rifelj	Hannah C. Dugan	132,461	64.90%	Paul Rifelj	70,098	34.35%	
Milwaukee	34	Glenn H. Yamahiro	Glenn H. Yamahiro	167,132	98.83%				
Milwaukee	44	Daniel L. Konkol	Gwen Connolly	167,479	98.93%				
Milwaukee	45	Michelle Ackerman Havas	Jean Marie Kies	100,409	49.86%	Michelle Ackerman Havas	99,225	49.28%	
Monroe	2	Mark L. Goodman	Mark L. Goodman	11,260	99.68%				
Monroe	3	J. David Rice	J. David Rice	11,100	99.61%				
Oconto	2	Jay Conley	Jay Conley	11,890	100.00%				
Pierce		Joseph D. Boles	Joseph D. Boles	10,309	100.00%				
Portage	2	Robert J. Shannon	Robert J. Shannon	12,551	54.22%	Trish Baker	10,515	45.42%	David R. Knaapen; Jared Redfield
Racine	2	Eugene A. Gasiorkiewicz	Eugene A. Gasiorkiewicz	40,407	100.00%				
Racine	4	John S. Jude	Mark Nielsen	34,573	71.84%	Joseph W. Seifert	13,554	28.16%	
Rock	2	Alan Bates	Alan Bates	35,354	99.29%				
Rusk	2	Steven P. Anderson	Steven P. Anderson	2,542	52.29%	Richard J. Summerfield	2,319	47.71%	
St. Croix	4	R. Michael Waterman	R. Michael Waterman	18,333	99.34%				
Sauk	1	Michael Screenock	Michael Screenock	15,773	100.00%				
Sauk	2	James Evenson	Wendy J. N. Klicko	10,757	53.36%	Kevin R. Calkins	9,403	46.64%	
Vilas		Neal A. Nielsen III	Neal A. Nielsen III	7,354	99.27%				
Walworth	2	James L. Carlson	Daniel S. Johnson	16,420	54.80%	Dan Necci	13,385	44.67%	Shannon Wynn
Walworth	4	David M. Reddy	David M. Reddy	24,024	99.14%				
Winnebago	3	Barbara Hart Key	Barbara Hart Key	41,909	99.23%				
Winnebago	5	John A. Jorgensen	John A. Jorgensen	40,795	99.29%				

== Local ==
=== Kenosha ===
- John Antaramian was elected to a four-year term as Mayor of Kenosha. He was returning to office after having previously served four four-year terms as mayor from 1992 through 2008.

=== Milwaukee ===
- Incumbent Tom Barrett was reelected to his fourth term as Mayor of Milwaukee, defeating alderman Bob Donovan.
- Incumbent County Executive Chris Abele was re-elected, defeating state senator Chris Larson.
