= Margaret J. Vergeront =

American judge

The Honorable Margaret J. Vergeront

Judge of the Wisconsin Court of Appeals District IV
- In office August 1, 1994 – July 31, 2012
- Preceded by: New seat
- Succeeded by: JoAnne Kloppenburg

Personal details
- Born: May 6, 1946 (age 80) Madison, Wisconsin, U.S.
- Education: University of Wisconsin–Madison (B.A., M.A., J.D)

Margaret J. Vergeront (born May 6, 1946) is an American attorney and retired judge. She served 18 years on the Wisconsin Court of Appeals in the Madison-based District IV court.

== Biography ==
Vergeront was born on May 6, 1946, in Madison, Wisconsin. She is a graduate of the University of Wisconsin-Madison and the University of Wisconsin Law School.

== Career ==
Vergeront was a law clerk to United States District Judge James Edward Doyle from 1975 to 1976; Doyle's son Jim Doyle later served as Governor of Wisconsin. Following her time working for Judge Doyle, she worked as a staff attorney for Legal Action of Wisconsin, a nonprofit providing pro bono legal services. In 1984, she went into private practice in Madison and continued until her election to the Wisconsin Court of Appeals in 1994.

She was unopposed in the 1994 election to a newly created seat on the District IV court. She was subsequently reelected in 2000 and 2006, never facing an opponent. She retired from the court in 2012.

Legal offices
New seat	Judge of the Wisconsin Court of Appeals District IV; August 1, 1994 – July 31, 2012	Succeeded by JoAnne Kloppenburg
