= 2011 Wisconsin Supreme Court election =

- April 5, 2011
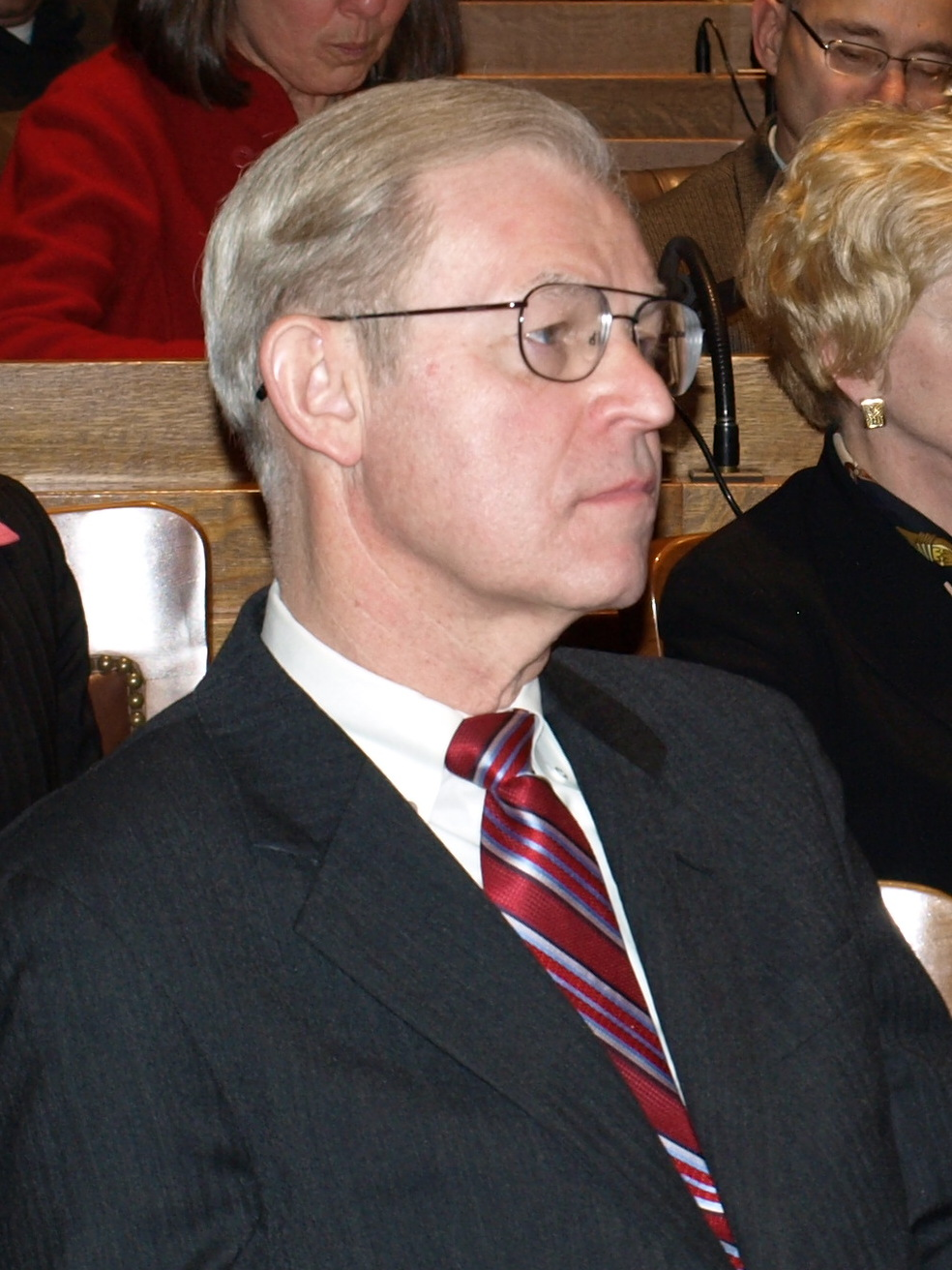

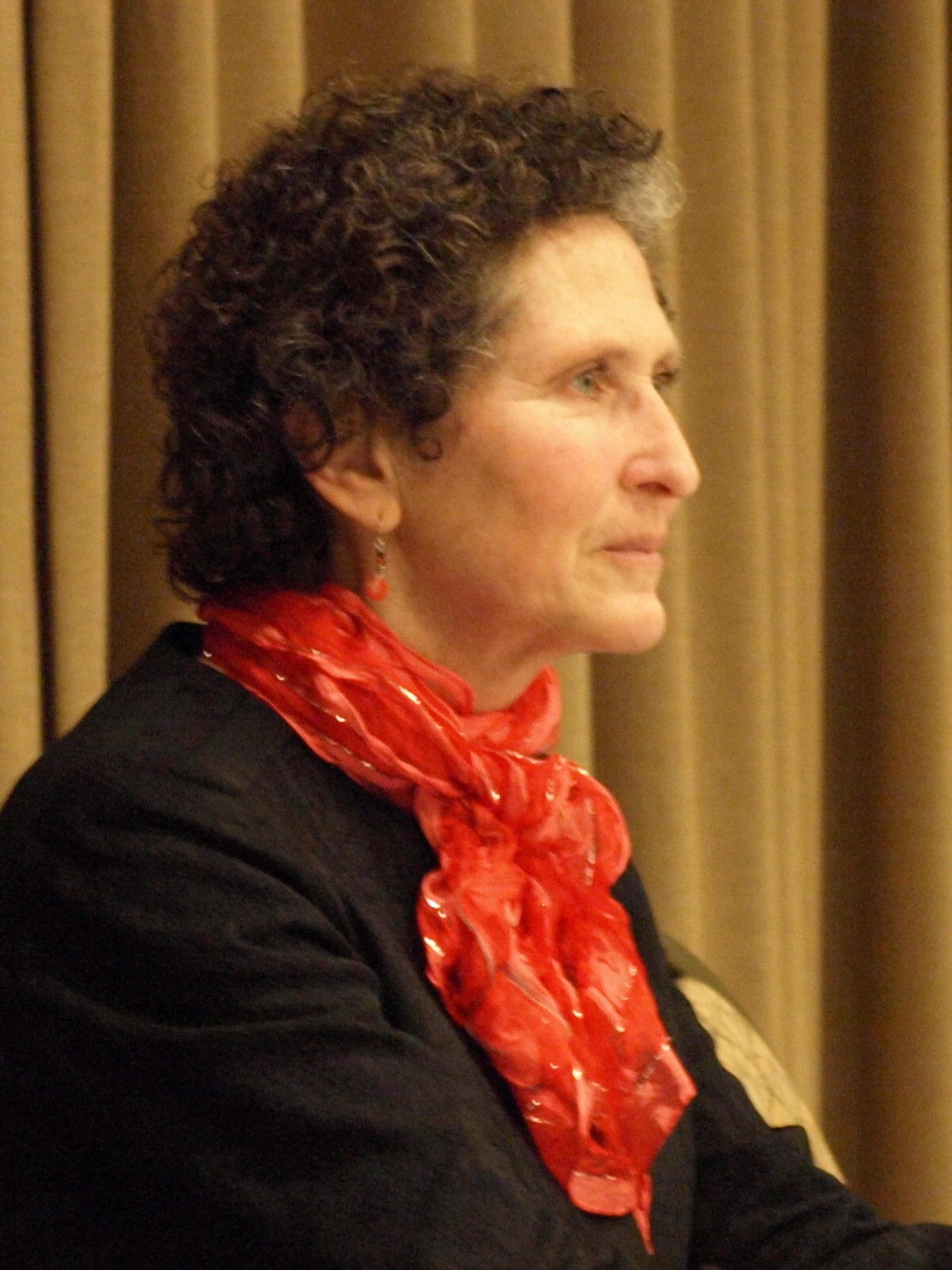
| Candidate | David Prosser Jr. | JoAnne Kloppenburg |
| Popular vote | 752,694 | 745,690 |
| Percentage | 50.23% | 49.77% |
- County results Prosser: 50–60% 60–70% 70–80% Kloppenburg: 50–60% 60–70% 70–80%
Justice before election
David Prosser Jr.
Elected Justice
David Prosser Jr.

The 2011 Wisconsin Supreme Court election took place on Tuesday, April 5, 2011. The incumbent justice, David Prosser Jr., was re-elected to another ten-year term, defeating assistant attorney general JoAnne Kloppenburg. Unlike past elections for the Wisconsin Supreme Court, the race gained significant nationwide publicity as it was widely seen as the first referendum on Wisconsin Governor Scott Walker's proposed anti-union legislation and the resulting protests.

== Primary election ==
In December 2010, Prosser's campaign director expressed strong support for governor-elect Walker, saying Prosser's "personal ideology more closely mirrors" Walker's, and that a win by Prosser would result in, "protecting the conservative judicial majority and acting as a common sense compliment to both the new administration and Legislature." He later disavowed the statements and claimed he had not seen the release. Prosser's campaign manager also said, "This election is about a 4-3 common sense conservative majority vs. a 3-4 liberal majority, and nothing more."

In a survey of attorneys conducted by the Milwaukee Bar Association that was published February 2011, Prosser received more votes saying he was "qualified" than any of his opponents; besting Kloppenburg by a margin of 296 to 112. He was endorsed in the Milwaukee Journal Sentinel, and the Sun Prairie Star. He won the primary handily, receiving 231,000 votes to second place finisher Kloppenburg's 105,000 votes; a 30% margin.

=== Candidates ===
==== Advanced ====
- JoAnne Kloppenburg, assistant Wisconsin Attorney General
- David Prosser, incumbent Justice of the Wisconsin Supreme Court

==== Eliminated in primary ====
- Marla Stephens, director of appeals for Wisconsin Public Defender office
- Joel Winnig, attorney

=== Results ===
Results by county: Prosser: Prosser 30–40%; Prosser 40–50%; Prosser 50–60%; Prosser 60–70%; Prosser 70–80%; Prosser 80–90%; Kloppenburg: Kloppenburg 30–40%; Kloppenburg 40–50%

Nonpartisan Primary Results
| Party | Candidate | Votes | % |
|---|---|---|---|
| Nonpartisan | David Prosser (incumbent) | 231,017 | 54.99% |
| Nonpartisan | JoAnne Kloppenburg | 105,002 | 24.99% |
| Nonpartisan | Marla Stephens | 45,256 | 10.77% |
| Nonpartisan | Joel Winnig | 37,831 | 9.01% |
| Write-in | | 1,004 | 0.24% |
| Total votes | | 420,110 | 100.0% |

== General election ==
=== Campaign ===
In the general election of April 5, 2011, Prosser again faced Kloppenburg. The contest received considerable attention due to the ongoing protests of Walker's budget repair bill and limitations on public employee bargaining rights; issues which would likely soon come before the Wisconsin Supreme Court. Heading into the election, the court had a conservative majority of 4-2-1 with Prosser identifying as a conservative and N. Patrick Crooks considered a swing vote. Both candidates stated their unhappiness with the increasingly partisan nature of the race.

Kloppenburg, supported by unions, particularly those of the public sector employees, tried to tie Prosser to the policies of Republican Governor Walker, and his March 2011 law limiting most of Wisconsin's public employees' collective bargaining rights. The non-partisan race for the court seat was also characterized as a proxy battle or referendum on the administration of Governor Walker and other Republican officials. Both candidates indicated their unhappiness regarding the increasingly partisan nature of the race, with Prosser claiming that his defeat would mean the end of judicial independence.

On March 31, Prosser's campaign co-chair, former Democratic governor Patrick Lucey, resigned from the campaign and endorsed Kloppenburg, claiming Prosser had lost his impartiality, and was showing "a disturbing distemper and lack of civility that does not bode well for the High Court". The Wausau Daily Herald reversed its primary election endorsement, and urged its readers to vote against Prosser in the general, describing him as "an intemperate figure given to partisan rhetoric". Citing the earlier statement of Prosser's campaign director that the election is about maintaining a conservative majority on the court, The Capital Times endorsed Kloppenburg. Prosser was endorsed by the Sun Prairie Star, The Milwaukee Journal-Sentinel, and former Alaska governor Sarah Palin (via Twitter), among others for the general election.

State officials predicted a voter turnout of around 20 percent, a typical level of turnout for an April election. However, voter interest and turnout were unusually high with nearly 1.5 million votes cast.

=== Results ===
On April 6, the Milwaukee Journal Sentinel, with 100% of precincts reporting and absentee ballots all tallied, had Kloppenburg maintaining a 204 vote lead. Re-canvassing began the next day to verify to election results, and errors were found in counties favoring both contestants; Prosser gained votes from Winnebago and Waukesha, while Kloppenburg regained ground from a scattering of other counties, including Grant, Portage, Door, Iowa, Rusk, Vernon, and Shawano. A news conference on April 7, held by the County Clerk of Waukesha County reported the existence of errors in Brookfield, Wisconsin where votes were never submitted to the Waukesha County total due to human error and that Prosser had picked up a 7,500-vote margin over Kloppenburg in the county as a result. In response, the Kloppenburg campaign filed an Open Records request for the contact records of the Waukesha County Clerk and a request was filed with the region's US Attorney to impound the additional ballots.

As of April 8, 2011, Waukesha County's turnout was officially 47% (increased from 42% before the correction). Statewide turnout during the election was officially 33%. On election day, Deputy Clerk Gina Kozlik had estimated turnout in the county to be 20-25%, with up to 35% turnout in some polling locations within the county. Nate Silver of FiveThirtyEight did an analysis on the turnout numbers and found the Waukesha results to be in line with previous elections. An independent investigation into the actions of Waukesha County Clerk found probable cause to believe that she violated the state law requiring county clerks to post all returns on Election Night, but concluded that the violation was not wilful and therefore did not constitute criminal misconduct.

The Wisconsin Government Accountability Board announced on April 8 that they were sending voting officials to Waukesha County to confirm the 14,315 votes that were found to never have been submitted from Brookfield. On April 15, Prosser was named the official winner by 7,316 votes after all county canvassing was completed. On April 20, Kloppenburg asked for a recount. The recount began on Wednesday, April 27 and must finish by May 9.

At the end of May 9, all Wisconsin counties aside from Waukesha had completed their recount process. In response, a Dane County judge gave them an extension until May 26 to complete the recount process. It was reported that Waukesha County was counting only one ward at a time and, on May 9, moved to a larger area in the Waukesha County courthouse in order to count two wards at one time. This is much slower than the rest of the counties, adjacent Milwaukee County reportedly counted eight wards simultaneously. Waukesha County reportedly took extra steps to ensure all votes were counted correctly.

On May 20, the recount was completed across the state with Prosser leading by 7,006 votes. On May 23, the Wisconsin Government Accountability Board confirmed Prosser won the election.

Wisconsin Supreme Court Election, 2011
| Party | Candidate | Votes | % |
|---|---|---|---|
Initial Canvass Totals
| Nonpartisan | David Prosser (incumbent) | 752,323 | 50.19% |
| Nonpartisan | JoAnne Kloppenburg | 745,007 | 49.70% |
| Write-in | | 1,559 | 0.11% |
| Total votes | | 1,498,889 | 100.0% |
Recount Totals
| Nonpartisan | David Prosser Jr. (incumbent) | 752,694 | 50.23% |
| Nonpartisan | Joanne Kloppenburg | 745,690 | 49.77% |
| Write-in | | 1,729 | 0.12% |
| Plurality | | 7,004 | 0.47% |
| Total votes | | 1,500,113 | 100.0% |

==== By county ====
| County | Won by | Prosser % | Prosser votes | Kloppenburg % | Kloppenburg votes |
|---|---|---|---|---|---|
| Adams | K | 48% | 2,385 | 52% | 2,557 |
| Ashland | K | 30% | 1,384 | 70% | 3,266 |
| Barron | P | 50% | 4,708 | 50% | 4,641 |
| Bayfield | K | 33% | 1,958 | 67% | 3,960 |
| Brown | P | 55% | 33,345 | 45% | 27,242 |
| Buffalo | P | 51% | 1,687 | 49% | 1,608 |
| Burnett | P | 54% | 1,943 | 46% | 1,659 |
| Calumet | P | 62% | 7,503 | 38% | 4,645 |
| Chippewa | K | 49% | 6,854 | 51% | 7,224 |
| Clark | P | 58% | 4,321 | 42% | 3,063 |
| Columbia | K | 45% | 7,306 | 55% | 8,963 |
| Crawford | K | 41% | 1,687 | 59% | 2,431 |
| Dane | K | 27% | 48,655 | 73% | 133,658 |
| Dodge | P | 61% | 13,379 | 39% | 8,524 |
| Door | P | 53% | 5,193 | 47% | 4,670 |
| Douglas | K | 31% | 3,815 | 69% | 8,676 |
| Dunn | K | 44% | 4,067 | 56% | 5,155 |
| Eau Claire | K | 42% | 11,425 | 58% | 15,933 |
| Florence | P | 62% | 800 | 38% | 483 |
| Fond du Lac | P | 61% | 15,942 | 39% | 10,188 |
| Forest | P | 56% | 1,531 | 44% | 1,198 |
| Grant | K | 44% | 4,285 | 56% | 5,705 |
| Green | K | 45% | 4,886 | 55% | 5,860 |
| Green Lake | P | 65% | 3,786 | 35% | 2,056 |
| Iowa | K | 38% | 2,455 | 62% | 3,915 |
| Iron | K | 45% | 755 | 55% | 934 |
| Jackson | K | 45% | 2,216 | 55% | 2,694 |
| Jefferson | P | 58% | 13,261 | 42% | 9,763 |
| Juneau | K | 48% | 2,539 | 52% | 2,700 |
| Kenosha | K | 47% | 14,419 | 53% | 16,245 |
| Kewaunee | P | 58% | 3,328 | 42% | 2,405 |
| La Crosse | K | 41% | 12,135 | 59% | 17,404 |
| Lafayette | K | 48% | 2,032 | 52% | 2,184 |
| Langlade | P | 58% | 2,664 | 42% | 1,895 |
| Lincoln | P | 50% | 3,576 | 50% | 3,545 |
| Manitowoc | P | 61% | 12,197 | 39% | 7,765 |
| Marathon | P | 54% | 17,126 | 46% | 14,836 |
| Marinette | P | 55% | 4,985 | 45% | 4,084 |
| Marquette | P | 56% | 2,219 | 44% | 1,723 |
| Menominee | K | 37% | 141 | 63% | 240 |
| Milwaukee | K | 43% | 99,368 | 57% | 129,108 |
| Monroe | K | 49% | 4,508 | 51% | 4,692 |
| Oconto | P | 57% | 5,212 | 43% | 3,879 |
| Oneida | P | 52% | 5,520 | 48% | 5,138 |
| Outagamie | P | 57% | 24,785 | 43% | 18,877 |
| Ozaukee | P | 72% | 20,854 | 28% | 8,298 |
| Pepin | K | 47% | 882 | 53% | 983 |
| Pierce | K | 45% | 4,056 | 55% | 4,915 |
| Polk | P | 51% | 4,661 | 49% | 4,439 |
| Portage | K | 40% | 8,121 | 60% | 12,124 |
| Price | P | 52% | 2,165 | 48% | 2,024 |
| Racine | P | 56% | 28,248 | 44% | 22,577 |
| Richland | K | 45% | 1,797 | 55% | 2,185 |
| Rock | K | 40% | 14,636 | 60% | 22,196 |
| Rusk | P | 53% | 2,189 | 47% | 1,941 |
| Sauk | K | 44% | 7,159 | 56% | 9,187 |
| Sawyer | P | 51% | 2,126 | 49% | 2,051 |
| Shawano | P | 61% | 5,543 | 39% | 3,628 |
| Sheboygan | P | 63% | 19,546 | 37% | 11,419 |
| St. Croix | P | 51% | 8,276 | 49% | 7,960 |
| Taylor | P | 61% | 3,652 | 39% | 2,292 |
| Trempealeau | K | 46% | 2,878 | 54% | 3,330 |
| Vernon | K | 45% | 3,578 | 55% | 4,331 |
| Vilas | P | 60% | 4,210 | 40% | 2,821 |
| Walworth | P | 61% | 14,245 | 39% | 8,936 |
| Washburn | K | 48% | 2,268 | 52% | 2,451 |
| Washington | P | 76% | 30,797 | 24% | 9,909 |
| Waukesha | P | 74% | 92,331 | 26% | 32,777 |
| Waupaca | P | 59% | 7,204 | 41% | 5,029 |
| Waushara | P | 60% | 3,402 | 40% | 2,301 |
| Winnebago | P | 52% | 20,719 | 48% | 18,908 |
| Wood | K | 49% | 8,865 | 51% | 9,287 |

== See also ==
- 2011 Wisconsin protests
- 2011 Wisconsin Act 10
- Wisconsin Senate recall elections, 2011
- Wisconsin Senate recall elections, 2012
- Wisconsin gubernatorial recall election, 2012
