= Milton Childs =

21st century American judge

The Honorable Milton Lee Childs

Judge of the Milwaukee County Circuit Court Branch 2
- Incumbent
- Assumed office November 2019
- Appointed by: Tony Evers
- Preceded by: Joe Donald

Personal details
- Born: 1963 or 1964 (age 61–62)
- Education: Xavier University; Marquette University Law School
- Profession: Lawyer, judge

Military service
- Branch/service: United States Marine Corps Reserve
- Rank: Sergeant, USMCR

Milton Lee Childs Sr. (born 1963/1964) is an American attorney and judge from Milwaukee, Wisconsin. He has served as a Wisconsin Circuit Court Judge in Milwaukee County since 2019, and was previously a state public defender.

== Life and career ==
Milton Childs was born and raised in Milwaukee, Wisconsin. He earned his bachelor's degree from Xavier University and worked as a math teacher for 12 years. During that time, he also served in the United States Marine Corps Reserve for 8 years, rising to the rank of sergeant.

Childs graduated from the Marquette University Law School in 2003. After law school, Childs worked at the Wisconsin State Public Defenders Office, where he rose to become a managing attorney. In 2019, Governor Tony Evers appointed Childs to the circuit court after he appointed his predecessor, Joe Donald, to the Wisconsin Court of Appeals. He was elected to a full term in 2021 after running unopposed.

Legal offices
Preceded by Joe Donald	Wisconsin Circuit Judge for the Milwaukee Circuit, Branch 2; 2019 – present	Incumbent
