= Rebecca Bradley =

American judge (born 1971)

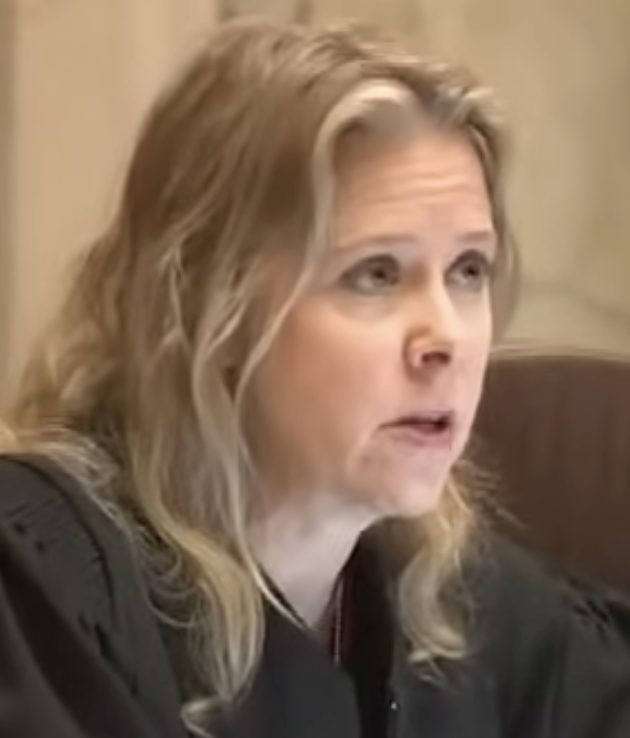
- Bradley in 2023

Justice of the Wisconsin Supreme Court
- In office October 12, 2015 – July 31, 2026
- Appointed by: Scott Walker
- Preceded by: N. Patrick Crooks
- Succeeded by: Chris Taylor

Judge of the Wisconsin Court of Appeals District I
- In office May 2015 – October 12, 2015
- Appointed by: Scott Walker
- Preceded by: Ralph Adam Fine
- Succeeded by: William W. Brash III

Judge of the Milwaukee County Circuit Court Branch 45
- In office December 2012 – May 2015
- Appointed by: Scott Walker
- Preceded by: Thomas P. Donegan
- Succeeded by: Michelle Ackerman Havas

Personal details
- Born: Rebecca Lynn Grassl; August 2, 1971 (age 55) Milwaukee, Wisconsin, U.S.
- Party: Republican
- Education: Marquette University (BA); University of Wisconsin, Madison (JD)
- Website: Campaign website

Rebecca Lynn Grassl Bradley (born August 2, 1971) is an American lawyer and jurist from Milwaukee County, Wisconsin. She served 11 years as a justice of the Wisconsin Supreme Court; after being appointed to the Court in 2015, she was elected to a full ten-year term in 2016, but declined to run for re-election in 2026. During her time on the Supreme Court, she identified with the conservative wing of the court, and said that after leaving the court she plans to work to "rebuild the conservative movement".

Prior to her elevation to the Supreme Court, Bradley served three years as a Wisconsin circuit court judge in Milwaukee County (2012–2015), and served five months as a judge of the Wisconsin Court of Appeals (2015). In all three of her judicial offices, she was appointed by Governor Scott Walker.

== Early life and education ==
Rebecca Bradley was born Rebecca Lynn Grassl, on August 2, 1971, in Milwaukee, Wisconsin. She attended the private, all-girls Divine Savior Holy Angels High School. She earned a BS in business administration and business economics from Marquette University in 1993. She received her JD from the University of Wisconsin Law School in Madison in 1996.

In 1992, while she was a student at Marquette University, she wrote several columns for the Marquette Tribune critical of homosexuality and comparing abortion to the Holocaust and slavery. In the columns, written under her maiden name, Rebecca Grassl, she wrote, "One will be better off contracting AIDS than developing cancer, because those afflicted with the politically correct disease will get all the funding," and "How sad that the lives of degenerate drug addicts and queers are valued more than the innocent lives of more prevalent ailments." She also wrote, "But the homosexuals and drug addicts who do essentially kill themselves and others through their own behavior deservedly receive none of my sympathy", as well as "Heterosexual sex is very healthy in a loving relationship; homosexual sex, however, kills." In another article, Bradley compared abortion to a "time in history when Jews were treated as nonhumans and tortured and murdered" and "a time in history when blacks were treated as something less than human". She apologized in 2016 after her columns were discovered by the group One Wisconsin Now.

== Early law career ==
From 1996 to 2012, Bradley worked as an attorney at several Milwaukee law firms, specializing in commercial litigation and intellectual property law, and as a software company executive. Considered a conservative, Bradley served as president of the Milwaukee Federalist Society chapter and participated in the Thomas More Society and the Republican National Lawyers Association. Bradley was a contributor to the campaign of Wisconsin Governor Scott Walker, a Republican.

In December 2012, Walker appointed Bradley to the Milwaukee County Circuit Court, where she served in the children's court division. She was elected to a six-year term on the court in April 2013, receiving substantial support from the conservative Wisconsin Club for Growth and defeating her future fellow Supreme Court colleague Janet Protasiewicz by a 53–47% margin.

== Wisconsin Supreme Court ==
=== 2015 appointment ===
In May 2015, Walker elevated Bradley to the Wisconsin Court of Appeals to fill a vacancy caused by the death of Judge Ralph Adam Fine. After the death of Justice N. Patrick Crooks in 2015, Bradley was appointed by Walker to serve as a justice of the Wisconsin Supreme Court for the remainder of Crooks' term.

=== Elections ===
==== 2016 ====
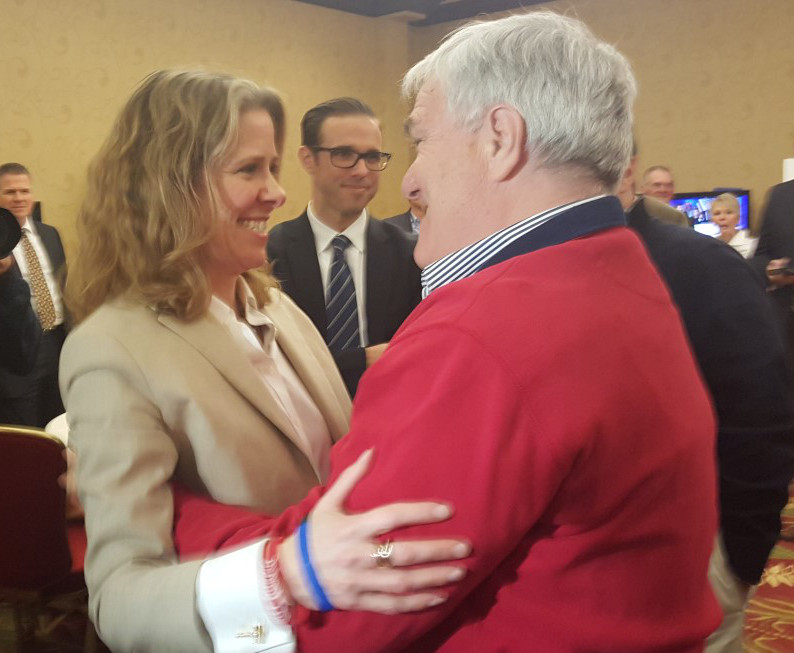
Bradley (left) at her 2016 election night party

After Crooks' death, Bradley, JoAnne Kloppenburg (who narrowly lost a race for the Wisconsin Supreme Court in 2011), and Joe Donald each announced their candidacy for the seat in the 2016 election. In the February 16 primary, Bradley edged Kloppenburg 44.7–43.2%, moving the two of them on to the general election in an even race.

Bradley's homophobic writings as an undergraduate, published in 1992 in Marquette University's student newspaper, stirred controversy during the race. She had written letters to the editor and a column for the Marquette Tribune, in which she stated she held no sympathy for AIDS patients because they were "degenerates" who had effectively chosen to kill themselves. She also referred to gay people as "queers". She called Americans who voted for Bill Clinton "either totally stupid or entirely evil". She blasted supporters of abortion as murderers, and compared abortion to the Holocaust and slavery. She attacked feminists as "angry, militant, man-hating lesbians who abhor the traditional family" and defended Camille Paglia, who had written in a 1991 column that "A girl who lets herself get dead drunk at a fraternity party is a fool. A girl who goes upstairs alone with a brother at a fraternity party is an idiot." Bradley wrote that Paglia had "legitimately suggested that women play a role in date rape". Bradley apologized for her student writings in 2016, shortly after the controversy arose.

Pre-election polls showed Bradley with a slight lead, but with a significant portion of the electorate still undecided. She was projected as the winner by a 53–47% margin on election night, and she quoted Winston Churchill at the end of her victory speech: "There is nothing more exhilarating than being shot at without result."

==== 2026 ====
On April 5, 2025, Bradley announced that she planned to seek re-election to the court in 2026. On August 29, 2025, after months of speculation due to nonexistent fundraising, Bradley announced that she had reversed her previous decision and would no longer seek reelection.

=== Tenure ===
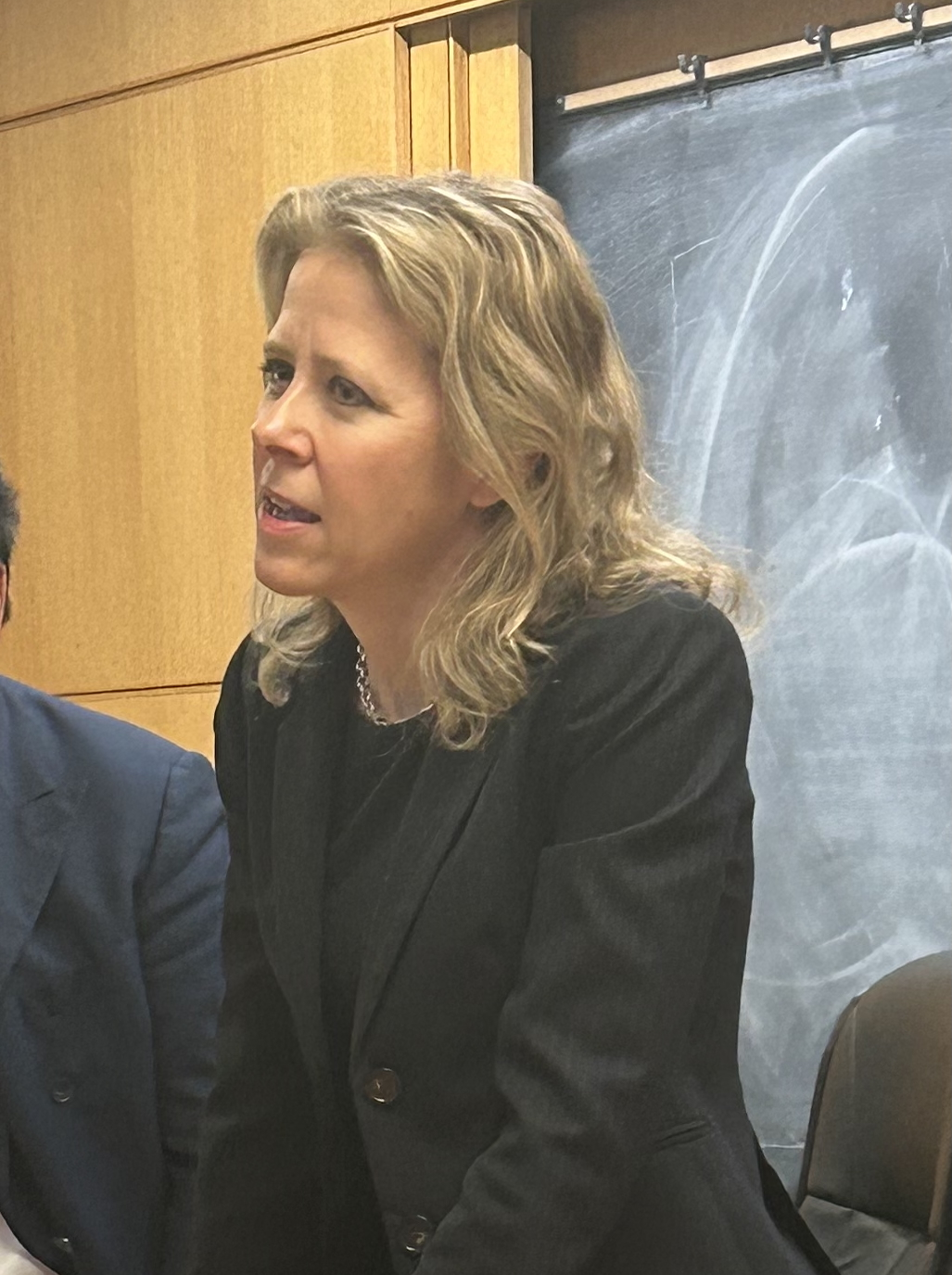
Bradley in 2024

In June 2019, Bradley wrote the majority opinion for the Wisconsin Supreme Court when conservatives on the court upheld a series of laws, passed by the Republican-led Wisconsin legislature and Republican Governor Scott Walker during a lame-duck session, limiting the powers of the incoming Democratic Governor (Tony Evers) and Attorney General (Josh Kaul).

During the COVID-19 pandemic in 2020, she dissented from a Wisconsin Supreme Court decision ordering the postponement of jury trials and the suspension of in-person court proceedings for public health reasons. In April 2020, during the pandemic, she joined the conservative majority on the Wisconsin Supreme Court in striking down Governor Evers' order to postpone an April 7 Wisconsin election due to the public health risks of the coronavirus. She voted in person on April 2, although casting a ballot in person before the date of the election is considered an absentee vote in Wisconsin. Examination of Justice Bradley's voting record demonstrates that she voted in person on Election Day in 4 of the 5 previous elections. In May 2020, she compared the stay-at-home orders to the internment of Japanese-Americans during World War II, and labeled them "tyrannic". In November 2020, while COVID-19 cases were surging in Wisconsin, she was in the Wisconsin Supreme Court's conservative majority which prevented the City of Racine Public Health Department from ordering school closures. In the fallout of the 2020 presidential election, Bradley issued a dissenting minority opinion in the unsuccessful case brought by the Trump campaign to overturn the 2020 presidential election results in Wisconsin. While agreeing with at least some of the Trump campaign's allegations, none of the dissenting judges (including Bradley) would say what relief they thought should be given to Trump's campaign; instead, they merely agreed that Trump was right. Bradley's dissent called the majority's decision not to overturn the election "an indelible stain" that would cause "significant harm to the rule of law".

In 2021, Bradley was the sole judge on the Wisconsin Supreme Court to rule in favor of a man who argued that his Second Amendment rights allowed him to brandish firearms while intoxicated and arguing with his roommates. Bradley said that the conviction against the man "erodes a fundamental freedom". In 2021, Bradley wrote a majority decision for the Wisconsin Supreme Court declining changes in district maps that favored Republicans. In her decision, Bradley wrote that questions about the redistricting maps "must be resolved through the political process and not by the judiciary".

In the 2022 decision Teigen v. Wisconsin Election Commission, which held that ballot drop boxes are illegal under Wisconsin statutes, Bradley wrote "If elections are conducted outside of the law, the people have not conferred their consent on the government. Such elections are unlawful and their results are illegitimate." Teigen was ultimately overturned by the Wisconsin Supreme Court on July 5, 2024, with Bradley authoring the dissenting opinion.

== Personal life ==
Bradley had a divorce in 2004.

== Electoral history ==
=== Wisconsin Circuit Court (2013) ===
Wisconsin Circuit Court, Milwaukee Circuit, Branch 45 Election, 2013
Party	Candidate	Votes	%	±%
Primary election, February 19, 2013
Nonpartisan	Rebecca Bradley (incumbent)	32,997	59.64%	
Nonpartisan	Janet Claire Protasiewicz	16,173	29.23%	
Nonpartisan	Gil Urfer	6,158	11.13%	
Total votes		55,328	100.0%	
General election, April 2, 2013
Nonpartisan	Rebecca Bradley (incumbent)	55,177	53.13%	
Nonpartisan	Janet Claire Protasiewicz	48,685	46.87%	
Total votes		103,862	100.0%	

=== Wisconsin Supreme Court (2016) ===
Wisconsin Supreme Court Election, 2016
Party	Candidate	Votes	%	±%
Primary election, February 16, 2016
Nonpartisan	Rebecca Bradley (incumbent)	251,823	44.61%	
Nonpartisan	JoAnne Kloppenburg	243,190	43.16%	
Nonpartisan	M. Joseph Donald	68,373	12.12%	
	Scattering	631	0.11%	
Total votes		567,038	100.0%	
General election, April 5, 2016
Nonpartisan	Rebecca Bradley (incumbent)	1,024,892	52.35%	
Nonpartisan	JoAnne Kloppenburg	929,377	47.47%	
	Scattering	4,678	0.24%	
Total votes		1,957,947	100.0%	

Legal offices
Preceded by Pat Crooks	Justice of the Wisconsin Supreme Court; 2015–2026	Succeeded by Chris Taylor
