= Milwaukee Bar Association =

Nonprofit legal organization

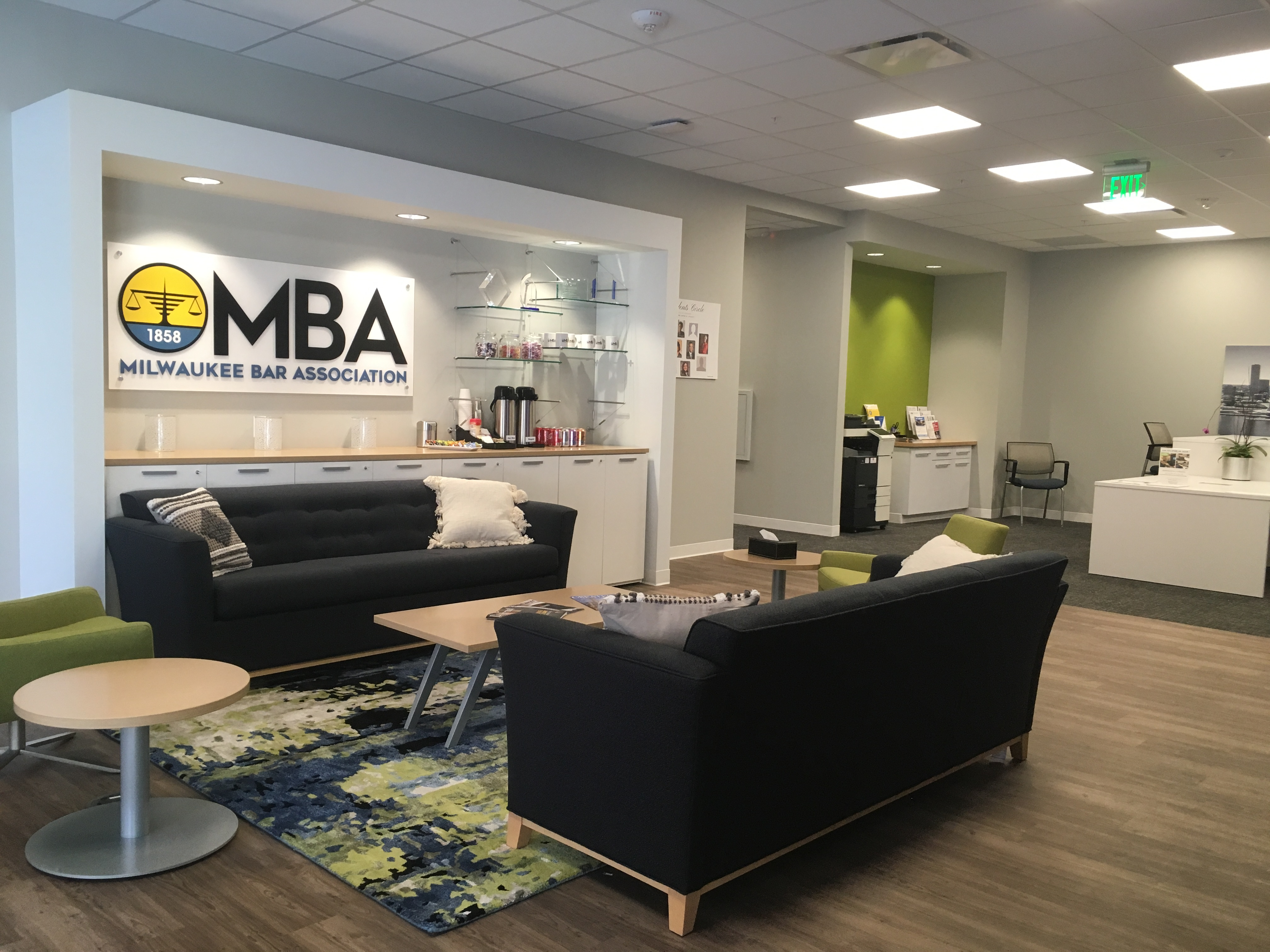
Milwaukee Bar Association

The Milwaukee Bar Association is a 501(c)(6) professional non-profit organization created to support legal professionals and to help provide access to justice. The MBA is located in Milwaukee, Wisconsin.

== History ==
The Milwaukee Bar Association was founded in 1858 with 30 charter members. It is the fifth oldest bar association in the United States. Today the Milwaukee Bar Association has over 2,000 members.

== Administration ==
Sarah J. Martis, CAE is the Executive Director of the Milwaukee Bar Association.
