= One Wisconsin Now =

- Formation: 2006
- Type: 501(c)(4)
- Headquarters: Wisconsin
- Executive Director: Analiese Eicher
- Website: www.onewisconsinnow.org

One Wisconsin Now is a liberal issue advocacy organization based in Wisconsin that focuses on advancing "progressive leadership and values." Created in 2006, One Wisconsin Now rose to prominence in 2006 when the group unsuccessfully opposed the election of Annette Ziegler to the Wisconsin Supreme Court. The group has called for investigations of a number of candidates for public office, including Wisconsin Supreme Court Justice Michael Gableman. Isthmus, a Madison alternative weekly newspaper, called One Wisconsin Now "[one of] the most prominent players" in the 2006 Wisconsin Supreme Court elections. One Wisconsin Now is an affiliate of ProgressNow.
