= Joe Donald =

American judge, Wisconsin Court of Appeals

The Honorable Joe Donald

Chief Judge of the Wisconsin Court of Appeals
- Incumbent
- Assumed office April 22, 2026
- Appointed by: Wisconsin Supreme Court
- Preceded by: Maxine Aldridge White

Judge of the Wisconsin Court of Appeals District I
- Incumbent
- Assumed office September 4, 2019
- Appointed by: Tony Evers
- Preceded by: Kitty Brennan

Judge of the Milwaukee County Circuit Court Branch 2
- In office 1996 – September 4, 2019
- Appointed by: Tommy Thompson
- Preceded by: George A. Burns Jr.
- Succeeded by: Milton Childs

Personal details
- Born: Martin Joseph Donald; February 8, 1959 (age 67) Milwaukee, Wisconsin, U.S.
- Spouse: Ann
- Children: 3
- Education: Marquette University (B.A.); Marquette Law School (J.D.)
- Website: Judge M. Joseph Donald

Martin Joseph Donald (born February 8, 1959) is an American lawyer and judge from Milwaukee, Wisconsin. He is the chief judge of the Wisconsin Court of Appeals, since April 2026, and has served on the Court of Appeals in the Milwaukee-based District I since 2019. Before his appointment to the Court of Appeals, he served 23 years as a Wisconsin circuit court judge in Milwaukee County.

== Life and career ==
Joe Donald was raised in Milwaukee and Shorewood, Wisconsin. His mother worked as a housekeeper for Richard D. Cudahy, who—during Donald's youth—served as chairman of the Democratic Party of Wisconsin and was then appointed a judge of the U.S. 7th Circuit Court of Appeals by President Jimmy Carter. Their families were close, and Judge Cudahy served as a mentor to Donald. Donald graduated from Marquette University in 1982 and Marquette University Law School in 1988. He subsequently served from 1988 to 1989 as a law clerk for the Wisconsin Circuit Court in Milwaukee County. From 1989 to 1996, Donald was an assistant city attorney in the Milwaukee City Attorney's Office.

In 1996, Donald was appointed by Governor Tommy Thompson, a Republican, to a vacant seat on the Milwaukee County Circuit Court. His oath was administered by his mentor, Judge Cudahy. Donald was elected to a six-year term on the court in 1997 and reelected in 2003, 2009, and 2015, without opposition. Judge Donald was instrumental in establishing the Milwaukee County Drug Treatment Court in 2009 and served as its first judge. The Drug Treatment Court was designed to use a system of rewards and penalties to redirect more people from jail toward treatment and recovery.

From 2015 to 2019, Donald served as a deputy chief judge of the court under chief judge Maxine Aldridge White.

In 2016, Donald sought election to the Wisconsin Supreme Court but placed third in the February primary, behind incumbent Justice Rebecca Bradley and Wisconsin Court of Appeals Judge JoAnne Kloppenburg. Judge Donald was endorsed in this race by former United States senator Herb Kohl.

On September 4, 2019, Donald was appointed by Democratic governor Tony Evers to a vacant Court of Appeals judgeship in Milwaukee. Donald succeeded the retiring Judge Kitty K. Brennan.

== Electoral history ==
=== Wisconsin Circuit Court (1997, 2003, 2009, 2015) ===
Wisconsin Circuit Court, Milwaukee Circuit, Branch 2 Election, 1997
| Party | Candidate | Votes | % | ±% |
|---|---|---|---|---|
General Election, April 1, 1997
| Nonpartisan | M. Joseph Donald (incumbent) | 68,708 | 100.0% | |
| Total votes | | 68,708 | 100.0% | |

Wisconsin Circuit Court, Milwaukee Circuit, Branch 2 Election, 2003
| Party | Candidate | Votes | % | ±% |
|---|---|---|---|---|
General Election, April 1, 2003
| Nonpartisan | M. Joseph Donald (incumbent) | 63,255 | 100.0% | |
| Total votes | | 63,255 | 100.0% | |

Wisconsin Circuit Court, Milwaukee Circuit, Branch 2 Election, 2009
| Party | Candidate | Votes | % | ±% |
|---|---|---|---|---|
General Election, April 7, 2009
| Nonpartisan | M. Joseph Donald (incumbent) | 50,774 | 100.0% | |
| Total votes | | 50,774 | 100.0% | |

Wisconsin Circuit Court, Milwaukee Circuit, Branch 2 Election, 2015
| Party | Candidate | Votes | % | ±% |
|---|---|---|---|---|
General Election, April 7, 2015
| Nonpartisan | M. Joseph Donald (incumbent) | 49,743 | 100.0% | |
| Total votes | | 49,743 | 100.0% | |

=== Wisconsin Supreme Court (2016) ===
Wisconsin Supreme Court Election, 2016
| Party | Candidate | Votes | % | ±% |
|---|---|---|---|---|
Primary Election, February 16, 2016
| Nonpartisan | Rebecca Bradley (incumbent) | 251,823 | 44.61% | |
| Nonpartisan | JoAnne Kloppenburg | 243,190 | 43.16% | |
| Nonpartisan | M. Joseph Donald | 68,373 | 12.12% | |
| | Scattering | 631 | 0.11% | |
| Total votes | | 567,038 | 100.0% | |
General Election, April 5, 2016
| Nonpartisan | Rebecca Bradley (incumbent) | 1,020,092 | 51.13% | |
| Nonpartisan | JoAnne Kloppenburg | 928,377 | 47.53% | |
| | Scattering | 4,678 | 0.24% | |
| Total votes | | 1,953,147 | 100.0% | |

Legal offices
| Preceded by George A. Burns Jr. | Wisconsin Circuit Court Judge for the Milwaukee Circuit, Branch 2; 1996 – 2019 | Succeeded by Milton Childs |
| Preceded by Kitty Brennan | Judge of the Wisconsin Court of Appeals District I 2019 – present | Incumbent |
| Preceded by Maxine Aldridge White | Chief Judge of the Wisconsin Court of Appeals; 2026 – present | Incumbent |
