= JoAnne Kloppenburg =

American judge (born 1953)

The Honorable JoAnne Kloppenburg
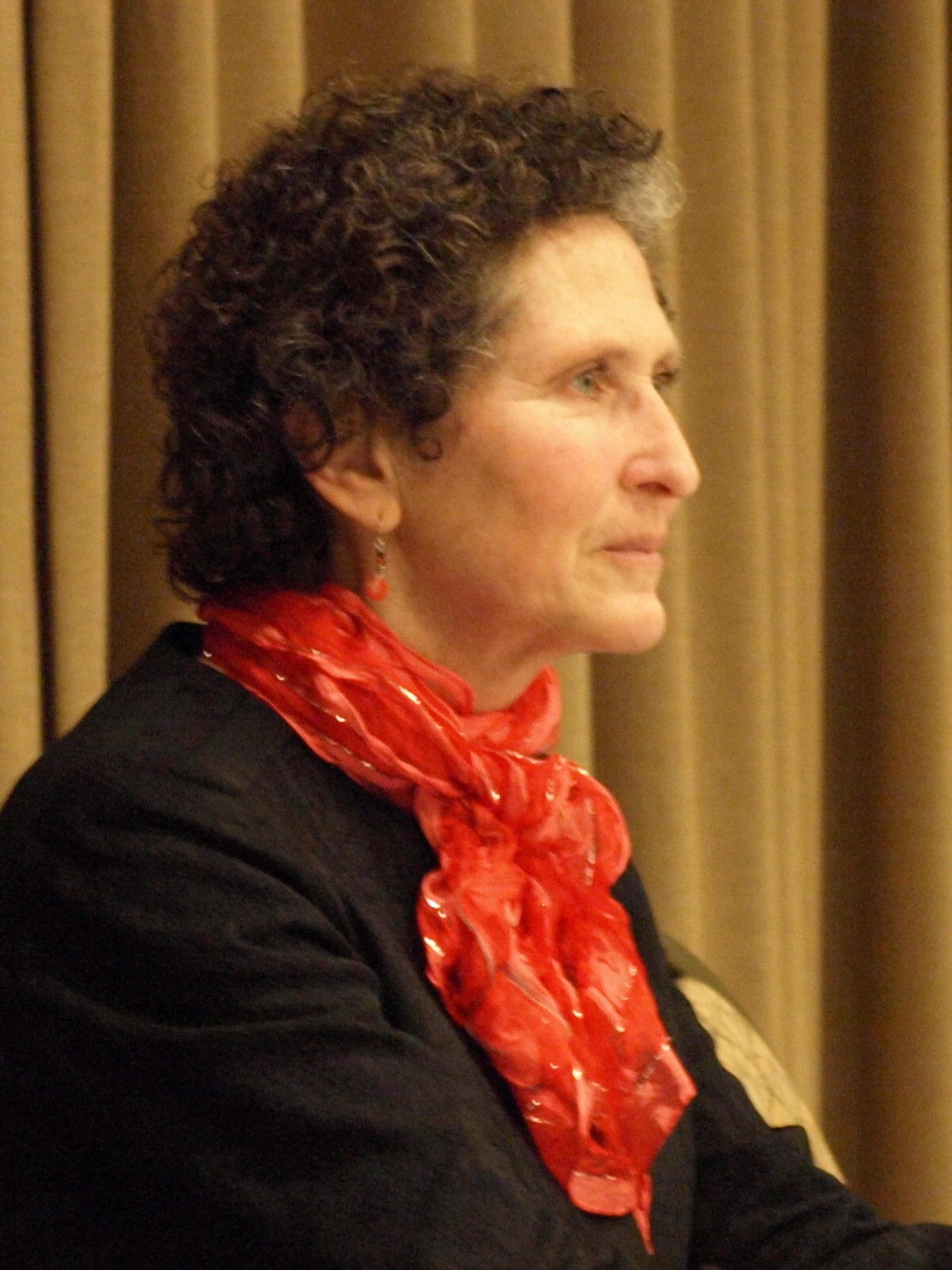
- Kloppenburg in 2011

Judge of the Wisconsin Court of Appeals District IV
- Incumbent
- Assumed office August 1, 2012
- Preceded by: Margaret J. Vergeront

Personal details
- Born: JoAnne Fishman; September 5, 1953 (age 73)
- Spouse: Jack Kloppenburg
- Education: Yale University (B.A.); Princeton University (M.P.A.); University of Wisconsin, Madison (J.D.)

JoAnne Fishman Kloppenburg (born September 5, 1953) is an American lawyer who has served as a judge of the Wisconsin Court of Appeals since 2012 in the Madison-based District IV. Kloppenburg was previously an assistant attorney general in the Wisconsin Department of Justice and was a candidate for the Wisconsin Supreme Court in 2011 and 2016. Before attending law school at the University of Wisconsin, she served in the Peace Corps in Botswana from 1976 to 1979.

== Education ==
Kloppenburg was born JoAnne Fishman to Dr. Elihu Fishman and his wife. She attended high school in Connecticut, and attended Yale University with a scholarship, a year after it began accepting women for study in 1969. She received her B.A. in Russian studies from there, and went to the Woodrow Wilson School at Princeton University afterwards, originally intending to eventually become an ambassador. Instead, she shifted her focus to third world development, and received her Master of Public Affairs degree in 1976.

== Public service and career ==
After graduation, Kloppenburg joined the Peace Corps and became a rural development planner in Botswana from 1976 to 1979. She intended to be there for two years, but the government of Botswana asked her to stay for another year afterwards to direct rural development for the entire country.

After returning to the United States, Kloppenburg worked on the Special Supplemental Nutrition Program for Women, Infants and Children in upstate New York, and was also an assistant dean at Wells College in Aurora, New York, at the same time.

Next, she attended law school at the University of Wisconsin, while interning for Chief Justice Shirley Abrahamson and clerking for U.S. District Court Judge Barbara Brandriff Crabb. In 1989, Kloppenburg joined the Wisconsin Department of Justice, eventually serving under four different Wisconsin Attorneys General, two of each party. Since 1991, she has been in the environmental protection unit, enforcing the state's environmental laws. She has also taught at the University of Wisconsin Law School since 1990 and is currently a mentor with the Dane County Bar Association, an English as a Second Language (ESL) tutor, and a member of her neighborhood association board.

== Wisconsin Supreme Court elections ==
=== 2011 election ===
On April 5, 2011, Kloppenburg faced incumbent Wisconsin Supreme Court Justice David Prosser, Jr. in an election for a seat on the Wisconsin Supreme Court, as she placed second to Prosser in the February primary. Although the election was ostensibly nonpartisan, the race between Prosser (a Republican) and Kloppenburg (a Democrat) received considerable partisan attention due to the 2011 Wisconsin protests regarding the budget repair bill, which was considered likely to come before the Wisconsin Supreme Court, as well as several controversies regarding the incumbent.

Both candidates stated their unhappiness regarding the increased partisan aspect of the race. Despite that, the race was generally seen as a referendum on the administration of Governor Scott Walker. As a result, national groups spent heavily on the race, with about $1.4 million spent by pro-union/Democratic groups and $2.1 million spent by conservative groups.

Kloppenburg described the central themes of her campaign as her independence and impartiality, citing as an example her refusal of special-interest money. She stated, "I have not wavered in my beliefs and will not start if I am elected as a justice. My focus will be on the court without any political bias." This theme was praised by local newspapers, such as the Green Bay Press-Gazette, which agreed that independence is a quality "critical for justices to rule fairly."

By contrast, Prosser described her as an 'unbending ideologue' with 'extreme political and social views' which he did not specify, pointing to her past internship with liberal Chief Justice Shirley Abrahamson, whom he called an 'activist' and 'total bitch.' In response, Kloppenburg replied, "It's ludicrous to say someone will be the clone of someone they interned for many years ago." Prosser later specified his comments by calling Kloppenburg "way out on the fringe", "a very liberal Democrat who has wandered into supporting Green Party candidates." Kloppenburg's husband had previously supported Ben Manski, a former student of his who was a Green Party candidate for Wisconsin State Assembly. Manski placed second in the election with 31% of the vote, 11% more than the Republican candidate.

At a candidate forum, Prosser asked Kloppenburg to take down a controversial third-party ad attacking Prosser on his decision not to prosecute a sexual abuse case involving a priest and young boys. Kloppenburg responded by stating that the ad wasn't hers, and "Like it or not, third parties have a First Amendment right to run ads of their own choosing."

On March 28, anonymous Republican sources said that the race was close to even. State officials expected a turnout of around 20%, a typical level of turnout for an April election.

On March 31, Prosser's campaign co-chairman, former governor Patrick Lucey, a Democrat, resigned from Prosser's campaign and endorsed Kloppenburg, attributing his decision to Prosser's "disturbing distemper and lack of civility", while praising Kloppenburg for showing "promising judicial temperament and good grace, even in the heat of a fierce campaign."

On April 6, after a preliminary count was released stating Kloppenburg held a 204-vote lead over Justice David Prosser, she issued a statement declaring victory and thanking Justice Prosser for his decades of public service. A recount of the votes was described by the Los Angeles Times as "inevitable."

On April 7, re-canvassing began to verify to election results, and errors were found in counties favoring both candidates; Prosser gained votes from Winnebago and Waukesha, while Kloppenburg regained ground from a scattering of other counties including Grant, Portage, Door, Iowa, Rusk, Vernon, and Shawano. However, an April 7 news conference by the Waukesha County Clerk announced that an estimated 14,000 votes had not been counted in Brookfield, Wisconsin, because she had made an error while saving data on her personal computer. The addition of the missing votes gave Prosser a commanding lead of more than 7,000 votes.

On April 15, the canvass was completed, showing that Prosser had a lead of 7,316 votes, a margin of 0.488%. Because the margin of victory was less than 0.5%, Kloppenburg was legally entitled to a recount. Following the recount, the Wisconsin Government Accountability Board, which oversees elections, certified Prosser as the winner by a margin of 7,004. On May 31, 2011, Kloppenburg conceded the election.

=== 2016 election ===
Wisconsin Supreme Court justice N. Patrick Crooks announced on September 16, 2015, that he would not seek re-election to the court in 2016. He died five days later. Governor Walker appointed Judge Rebecca Bradley to fill the remainder of his term. Kloppenburg, Bradley and Joe Donald each announced their candidacy for the seat in the 2016 election, with Bradley as the sole Republican and Kloppenburg and Donald as Democrats.

In the February 16 primary, Bradley edged Kloppenburg 44.7%–43.2%, moving the two of them on to the general election. In a repeat of 2011, the race became extremely partisan after the primary, with major focus given to articles Bradley had written in the Marquette University student newspaper in 1992, when she was 21, attacking AIDS patients, drug users, and supporters of abortion on demand. Kloppenburg attacked Bradley's student writings, stating: "There is no statute of limitations on hate. Rebecca Bradley's comments are as abhorrent and disturbing today as they were in 1992 as people were dying in huge numbers from AIDS."

In the April 5 election, Kloppenburg lost to Bradley by approximately 53%–47%.

== Wisconsin Court of Appeals ==
In the April 2012 Wisconsin General Election, Kloppenburg was elected to the Wisconsin Court of Appeals.

== Personal life ==
JoAnne Kloppenburg is married to Jack Kloppenburg, a fellow graduate of Yale. They joined the Peace Corps together after their marriage. Jack is now a professor at the University of Wisconsin.

== Electoral history ==
=== Wisconsin Supreme Court (2011) ===
Wisconsin Supreme Court Election, 2011
Party	Candidate	Votes	%	±%
Primary Election, February 15, 2011
Nonpartisan	David T. Prosser, Jr. (incumbent)	231,017	54.99%	
Nonpartisan	JoAnne F. Kloppenburg	105,002	24.99%	
Nonpartisan	Marla Stephens	45,256	10.77%	
Nonpartisan	Joel Winnig	37,831	9.01%	
	Scattering	1,004	0.24%	
Total votes		420,110	100.0%	
General Election, April 5, 2011
Nonpartisan	David T. Prosser, Jr. (incumbent)	752,694	50.18%	
Nonpartisan	JoAnne F. Kloppenburg	745,690	49.71%	
	Scattering	1,729	0.12%	
Total votes		1,500,113	100.0%	

=== Wisconsin Court of Appeals (2012) ===
Wisconsin Court of Appeals District IV Election, 2012
Party	Candidate	Votes	%	±%
General Election, April 3, 2012
Nonpartisan	JoAnne F. Kloppenburg	205,065	96.46%	
	Scattering	7,523	3.54%	
Total votes		212,588	100.0%	

=== Wisconsin Supreme Court (2016) ===
Wisconsin Supreme Court Election, 2016
Party	Candidate	Votes	%	±%
Primary Election, February 16, 2016
Nonpartisan	Rebecca Bradley (incumbent)	251,823	44.61%	
Nonpartisan	JoAnne Kloppenburg	243,190	43.16%	
Nonpartisan	M. Joseph Donald	68,373	12.12%	
	Scattering	631	0.11%	
Total votes		567,038	100.0%	
General Election, April 5, 2016
Nonpartisan	Rebecca Bradley (incumbent)	1,020,092	51.13%	
Nonpartisan	JoAnne Kloppenburg	928,377	47.53%	
	Scattering	4,678	0.24%	
Total votes		1,953,147	100.0%	

Legal offices
Preceded by Margaret J. Vergeront	Judge of the Wisconsin Court of Appeals District IV; 2012 – present	Incumbent
