= Wisconsin's congressional districts =

U.S. House Districts in the state of Wisconsin

Map of Wisconsin's congressional districts from 2023 Interactive map version

Wisconsin is currently divided into 8 congressional districts, each represented by a member of the United States House of Representatives. After the 2020 census, the number of Wisconsin's seats remained unchanged.

Wisconsin’s congressional districts are an example of partisan gerrymandering, in this case in favor of the Republican Party. Princeton University's Gerrymandering Project gave Wisconsin's districts an overall grade of "F" with a "Significant Republican advantage".

== Current districts and representatives ==
This is a list of United States representatives from Wisconsin, their terms, their district boundaries, and the district political ratings, according to the Cook Partisan Voting Index. The delegation in the 119th Congress is unchanged from the 118th Congress and has 8 members: 6 Republicans and 2 Democrats.

Current U.S. representatives from Wisconsin
District	Member (Residence)	Party	Incumbent since	CPVI (2026)	District map
1st	Bryan Steil (Janesville)	Republican	January 3, 2019	R+2	
2nd	Mark Pocan (Vermont)	Democratic	January 3, 2013	D+21	
3rd	Derrick Van Orden (Prairie du Chien)	Republican	January 3, 2023	R+3	
4th	Gwen Moore (Milwaukee)	Democratic	January 3, 2005	D+26	
5th	Scott Fitzgerald (Clyman)	Republican	January 3, 2021	R+11	
6th	Glenn Grothman (Glenbeulah)	Republican	January 3, 2015	R+8	
7th	Tom Tiffany (Minocqua)	Republican	May 19, 2020	R+11	
8th	Tony Wied (De Pere)	Republican	November 12, 2024	R+8	

== Historical and present district boundaries ==
Table of United States congressional district boundary maps in the State of Wisconsin, presented chronologically. All redistricting events that took place in Wisconsin between 1973 and 2013 are shown.

Year	Statewide map
1973–1982	
1983–1992	
1993–2002	
2003–2013	
2013–2023	

== Obsolete districts ==
=== Wisconsin Territory's at-large congressional district ===
Wisconsin’s Territory’s at-large congressional district was created in 1836 and dissolved in 1849. This district was the place holder for the other districts in the state while Wisconsin was considered a territory. Once statehood was achieved the congressional district was dissolved.

=== Wisconsin's 9th Congressional District ===
Wisconsin’s 9th congressional district was one of the House of Representatives of the United States districts for the state. This congressional district was created in 1880 and existed for 120 years before being disbanded in 2000. This district was located around the northeastern side of the state, before being moved to the west side, and after being the district surrounding the Milwaukee Country area.

=== Wisconsin's 10th congressional district ===
Wisconsin’s 10th congressional district was another one of the United States’ House of Representatives districts. This congressional district was created in 1890 and existed for 80 years before being disbanded in 1970. This district was initially located in the northwestern part of the state, before being relocated to a central portion of the north, and subsequently to the central western section. Before finally returning to the northwestern section, before being disbanded.

=== Wisconsin's 11th congressional district ===
Wisconsin’s 11th congressional district was one of the House of Representatives of the United States district for the state. This congressional district was created in 1900 and existed for 30 years before being disbanded. The district was located in the Northwestern section of the state before quickly being disbanded.

== Remapping Court Cases ==
The court cases mentioned in this article are by no means an exhaustive list of all court cases but it does paint a picture of more recent cases that have been brought up. Clark v. Wisconsin Elections Commission was a case that was brought before the Wisconsin Supreme Court in 2023. It was brought to the court to challenge the redistricting efforts at the time. The case aimed to challenge the previously established rule of 'least changes' that was established by Johnson v Wisconsin Elections Commission which the petitioners claimed violated the Wisconsin Constitution. The maps in question were drawn after the 2020 Census. The ruling of this case created the filing from the Elias Law Group in January of 2024.

The suit brought by Elias Law Group alleged that the maps are based on a "now discredited legal principle" that upheld GOP-drawn maps unnecessarily. February 13th of 2024 the Wisconsin State Senate and Assembly voted to pass new Congressional maps prior to the State Supreme Court taking action on the Elias Law Group case. On February 19th of 2024 Ever's signed the maps that were passed by the Senate and Assembly into law. These maps affect the lean of fifteen of the ninety nine Assembly districts. The Assembly districts 2nd, 3rd, 4th, 7th, 13th, 25th, 32nd, 42nd, 55th, 68th, 80th, 84th, 86th, 91st, and the 97th were all changed under Ever's 2024 maps. Of the thirty three Senate districts the six that are affected by the 2024 maps are the 8th, 13th, 21st, 26th, 30th and the 31st.

In 2025 the Wisconsin Supreme Court rejected two lawsuits that aimed to redistrict the state's eight current districts. Both of the lawsuits alleged that the maps of the time were giving the Republican party and unfair advantage. In July of 2025 there was another suit to challenge the districts on a different ground. The suit was brought up by The Wisconsin Business Leaders for Democracy Coalition and charges the maps with being an anti competitive gerrymander. This suit also asked to be ruled on by a panel of three circuit court judges, something that was instituted by Republicans in 2011 but not often used since then. Alongside the Wisconsin Business Leaders for Democracy Coalition suit asking for a panel Elias Law Group filed another suit also asking for a three judge panel to rule on their case. On the federal level judicial panels are often called for cases, one notable example of this being Brown v Board of Education.

== See also ==
- List of United States congressional districts
