= 2012 Wisconsin gubernatorial recall election =

Recall election in US state

- June 5, 2012
- Turnout: 57.8% (▲8.1%)
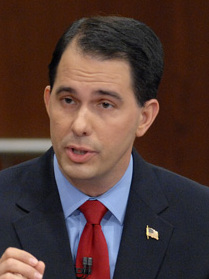

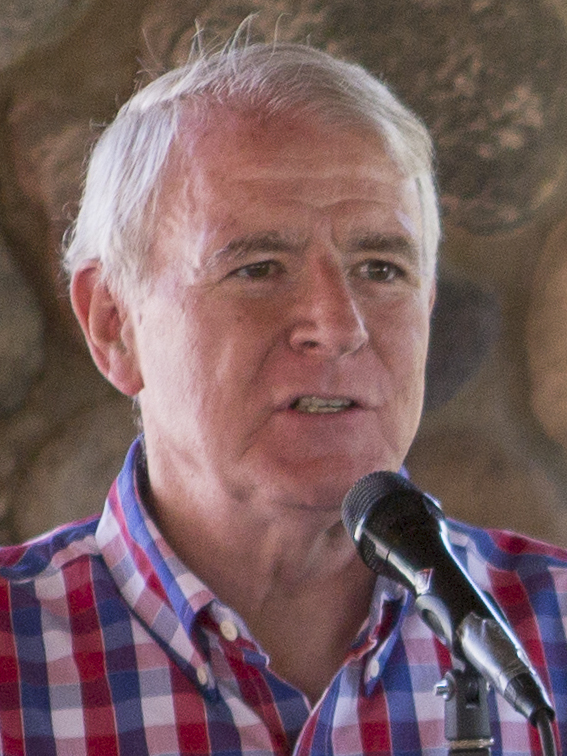
| Nominee | Scott Walker | Tom Barrett |
| Party | Republican | Democratic |
| Popular vote | 1,335,585 | 1,164,480 |
| Percentage | 53.08% | 46.28% |
- Walker: 40–50% 50–60% 60–70% 70–80% 80–90% >90% Barrett: 40–50% 50–60% 60–70% 70–80% 80–90% >90% Tie: 50% No data
Governor before election
Scott Walker
Republican
Elected Governor
Scott Walker
Republican

The 2012 Wisconsin gubernatorial recall election was an election to elect the governor and lieutenant governor of Wisconsin. It resulted in voters re-electing incumbent Republican governor Scott Walker over the Democratic candidate Tom Barrett by a larger margin than in 2010 when Walker also faced Barrett. Recall organizers opposed Walker's agenda, particularly his limiting of collective bargaining rights for state employees, and they collected over 900,000 signatures to initiate the recall election process. There was also a recall for Lieutenant Governor Rebecca Kleefisch. She won her race, defeating Democrat Mahlon Mitchell, making her the first lieutenant governor to run in and survive a recall.

The Democratic primaries took place on May 8. The recall elections were held on June 5, with Walker defeating Barrett. Walker was thus the first U.S. governor to continue in office after facing a recall election.

Four state senate recall elections took place the same day as the gubernatorial recall elections, resulting in two wins by Republican incumbents, one open seat win by a Republican, and one win by a Democratic challenger, giving Democrats control of the state Senate for the remainder of the year.

The recall election was just the third gubernatorial recall election in U.S. history and the first one in which the incumbent was not defeated. The other recall elections were the 1921 North Dakota gubernatorial recall election (which successfully recalled Lynn Frazier) and the 2003 California gubernatorial recall election (which successfully recalled Gray Davis). After 2012, the 2021 California gubernatorial recall election became the second recall election to fail to defeat the incumbent.

As of 2026, this is the last governor election in which the Republican candidate won the counties of Eau Claire, Sauk, Green, and Vernon.

Voter turnout in the election was 57.8 percent, the highest for a gubernatorial election not on a presidential ballot in Wisconsin history up to that point. The election was widely covered on national television.

== Background ==
=== Pre-certification recall campaign ===
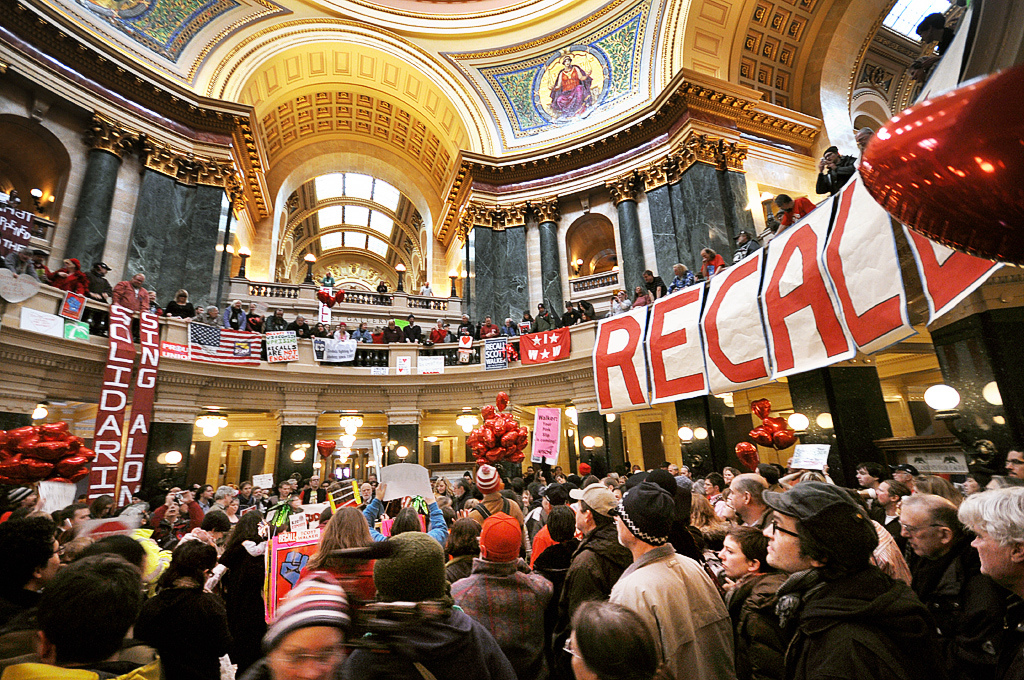
Protests in the Capitol, February 14, 2012

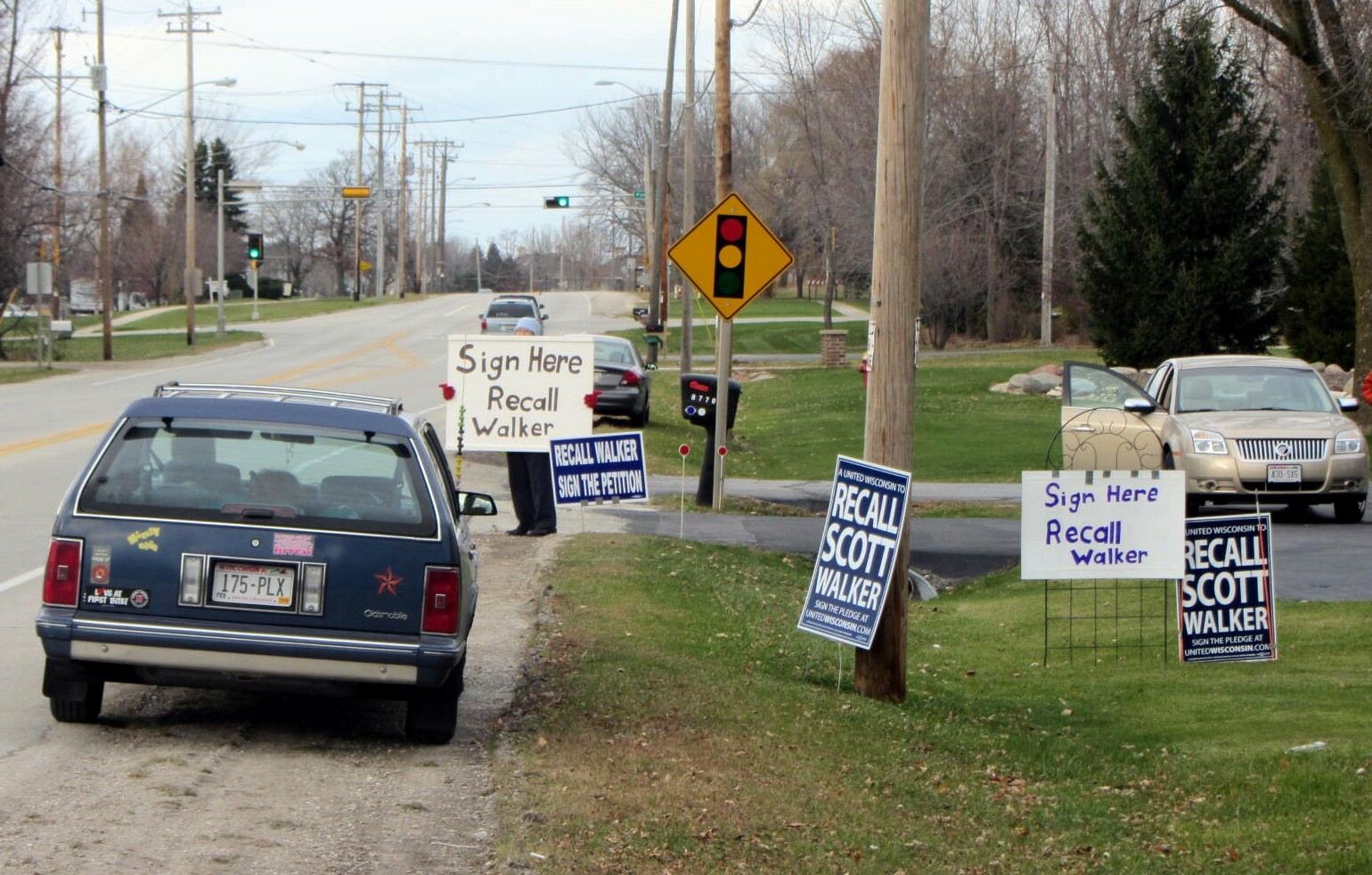
Recall organizers collecting petition signatures from motorists in Oak Creek, Wisconsin in November 2011

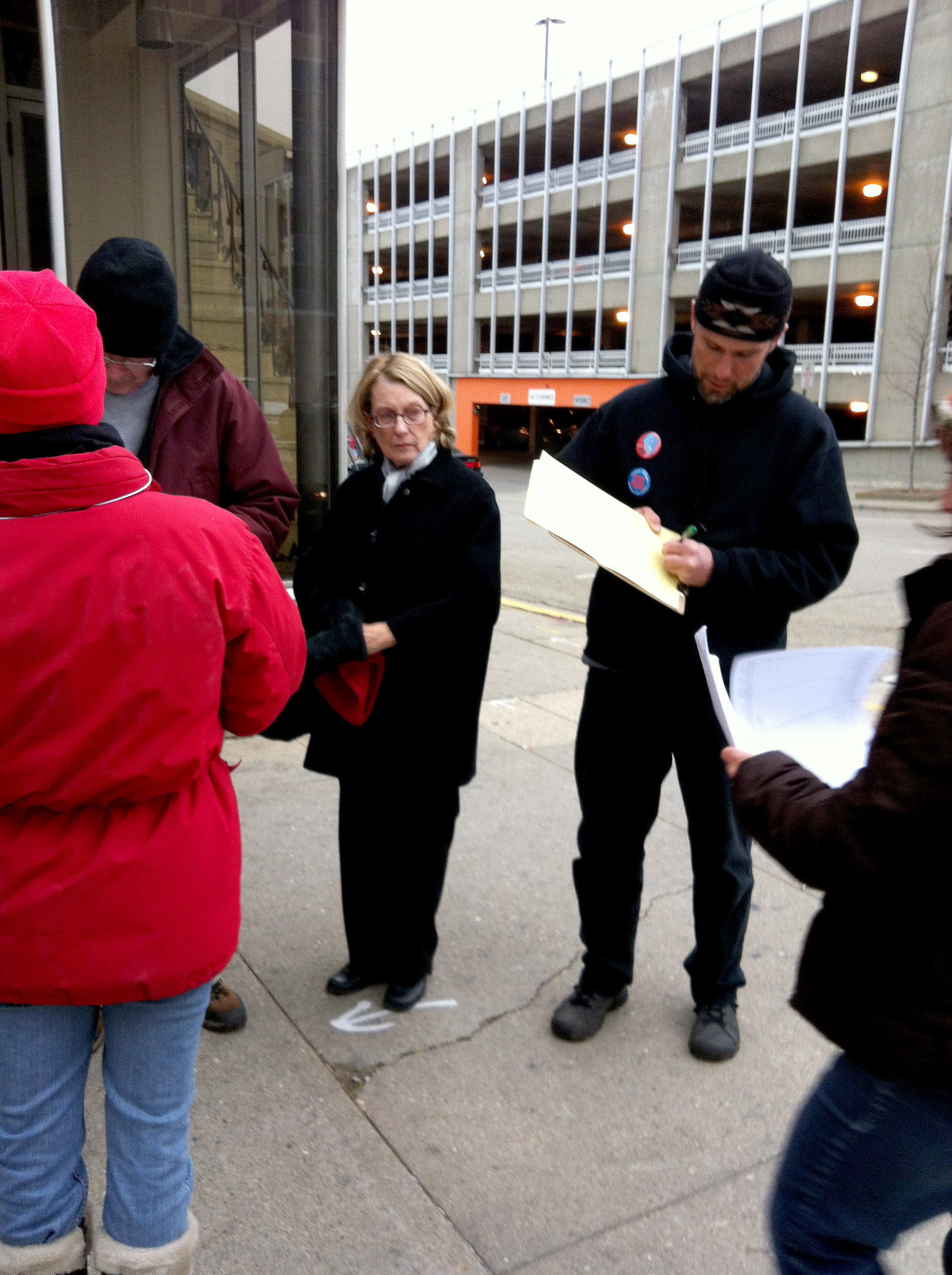
Petition signatures being collected in Madison, Wisconsin in November 2011

Incumbent Republican Governor Scott Walker faced a recall effort beginning in November 2011. After the contentious collective bargaining dispute, Walker's disapproval ratings varied between 50 and 51% while his approval ratings varied between 47% and 49% in 2011.

Wisconsin law made Walker ineligible for recall until at least January 3, 2012, one year after he first took office, and the Wisconsin Democratic Party called it a "priority" to remove him from office. In the first half of 2011, Walker raised more than $2,500,000 from supporters. Walker raised $5.1 million in the second half of 2011 to battle his recall.

In less than half of the allotted time (60 days) to collect signatures, recall organizers report collecting more than 500,000 signatures, leaving roughly one month left to collect the remaining 40,000 signatures needed to force a recall vote. On January 17, 2012, United Wisconsin, the coalition that spearheaded the recall effort, along with the Democratic Party, said that one million signatures were collected, which far exceeded the 540,208 needed, and amounted to 23 percent of the state's eligible voters, 46 percent of the total votes cast in the 2010 gubernatorial election and just shy of the 1.1 million votes earned by Walker.

On January 25, 2012, a poll released by the Marquette University Law School indicated that Walker could win a recall election against potential candidates Tom Barrett, Kathleen Falk, David Obey or Tim Cullen. This compared to a poll released by Public Policy Polling in October 2011 that also predicted Walker would win a recall election against Barrett, Falk, Peter Barca, Steve Kagen or Ron Kind. The poll also showed that more people opposed (49%) than supported (48%) the recall effort.

In February 2012, Walker's campaign made an additional request for more time for the petition signatures to be verified, stating that between 10 and 20% of the signatures reviewed to that point should not be counted. Democrats argued that even if 20% of the signatures were not counted there were still 300,000 more than the required number needed to initiate the recall. Democratic Party spokesman Graeme Zielinski argued Walker was just "delaying the inevitable". Additionally, in the period while signatures were being verified Barrett and Walker were able to collect unlimited campaign donations because normal campaign fundraising limits do not apply until an election is ordered. On February 17, 2012, Dane County judge Richard Niess, who also signed the petition, denied Walker's request for additional time.

In March Milwaukee city officials asked Milwaukee Public Schools to contribute nearly $10 million more to the pension plan because of financial market downturns. The teachers' union, school board and the superintendent asked the legislature for the opportunity to negotiate to reduce costs. Milwaukee schools didn't take part in a 90-day window that had since closed, which allowed unions and municipal employees to make contract adjustments. The Assembly and Senate agreed to allow Milwaukee schools to reopen negotiations for compensation or fringe-benefit concessions without nullifying existing union contracts. The measure giving them 90 days passed the Assembly and Senate. Governor Scott Walker supported the measure. Other teachers' unions asked Milwaukee to withdraw its request, saying it would give Walker a political advantage in the recall election.

=== Certification ===
On March 29, 2012, the Wisconsin Government Accountability Board released its final signature counts for the Walker recall petition. The GAB reported that 931,053 signatures were officially turned in, although the proponents had stated that approximately one million signatures were collected. Of that number, 26,114 were struck by GAB staff for various reasons and an additional 4,001 duplicates were struck. The final total certified by the GAB was 900,938 signatures.

== Controversies ==
Twenty-nine circuit court judges in Wisconsin signed recall petitions against Gov. Walker, according to a Gannett Wisconsin Media analysis. Among the signers was Dane County Judge David Flanagan, who was scrutinized after issuing a temporary restraining order March 6 against a Walker-backed voter ID law without disclosing his support of the recall. None of the state's sixteen appeals court judges or seven Supreme Court justices signed the recall petition. The state Supreme Court issued an advisory opinion in 2001 saying judges are allowed to sign nominating petitions, as long as the petition language only supports putting the candidate on the ballot and does not imply an endorsement. The Landmark Legal Foundation requested an investigation to the Wisconsin Judicial Commission regarding allegations of misconduct by the judges in question.

It was later learned that 25 journalists at Gannett had also signed the recall petition. The newspaper group revealed the signatures in the interest of being as open as possible. Genia Lovett, representative for the organization, stated that journalists have a right to hold opinions, but must protect the credibility of their respective news organizations.

Other media organizations had staff who signed the recall petition. Rob Starbuck, the morning news anchor for Madison, Wisconsin, television station WISC-TV, signed the Walker recall petition. The station stated that the signing was in violation of the station's policy for newsroom employees. Television stations WISN, WTMJ, WITI, WDJT and radio station WTMJ in Milwaukee discovered that some staff members signed petitions to recall Walker. Some employees at WTMJ claimed signing the recall petition was not a political act, but rather, similar to casting a vote. WTMJ stated it did not agree and indicated they would take measures to make sure their reporting was fair and balanced, and to ensure no future similar controversies. The WITI television journalist who had signed the petition was reassigned and prohibited from covering Walker-related stories.

The cost of the recall election had also drawn criticism. An estimate provided by the state Government Accountability Board showed a cost of $9 million for a statewide election. Since a primary election was also conducted for this race, Representative Robin Vos estimated the cost would be double, around $18 million.

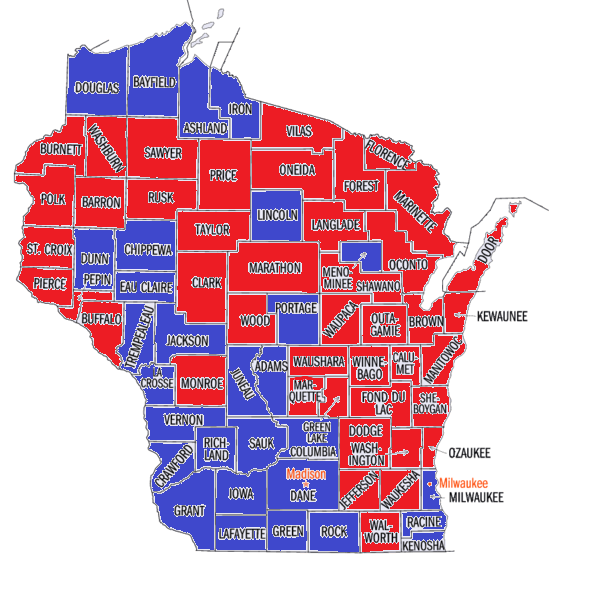
Results of the Wisconsin gubernatorial primary on May 8, 2012. Red counties had more votes for Walker than all Democrats combined. Blue counties had more votes for all Democrats combined than Walker.

=== Costs and spending ===
The recall elections were the most expensive elections in Wisconsin history. According to the advocacy group Wisconsin Democracy Campaign, candidates and outside groups spent more than $80 million in the governor's recall race. This compares to $37.4 million spent on the 2010 Wisconsin gubernatorial election.

According to USA Today, "More than $62 million was spent by the candidates and outside groups. Much of the $30 million raised by Walker came from outside the state. Barrett ... spent about $4 million; most of his donors live in Wisconsin." Barrett also benefited from spending by labor unions throughout the recall, estimated at another $20 million. Kathleen Falk, who was defeated by Barrett in the Democratic primary, raised about $5.2 million from public-sector unions inside and outside the state. The cost of the recall elections for the governor and lieutenant governor to Wisconsin taxpayers was $18 million.

== Republican primary ==
=== Candidates ===
- Arthur Kohl-Riggs, activist
- Scott Walker, incumbent governor

=== Endorsements ===
Scott Walker

U.S. senators

- Rick Santorum, former U.S. senator from Pennsylvania (1995–2007)

U.S. representatives

- Newt Gingrich, former U.S. representative from Georgia's 6th congressional district (1979–1999) and 50th Speaker of the United States House of Representatives (1995–1999)
- Ron Paul, U.S. representative from Texas's 14th congressional district (1997–2013), Texas's 22nd congressional district (1976–1977, 1979–1985)
- Paul Ryan, U.S. representative from Wisconsin's 1st congressional district (1999–2019)

Statewide officials

- Chris Christie, governor of New Jersey (2010–2018)
- Ken Cuccinelli, attorney general of Virginia (2010–2014)
- Nikki Haley, governor of South Carolina (2011–2017) and former member of the South Carolina House of Representatives (2005–2011)
- Bobby Jindal, governor of Louisiana (2008–2016) and former U.S. representative of Louisiana (2005–2008)
- Bob McDonnell, governor of Virginia (2010–2014) and former attorney general of Virginia (2006–2009)
- Sarah Palin, former governor of Alaska and former vice-presidential nominee (2008)
- Sean Parnell, governor of Alaska (2009–2014) and former lieutenant governor of Alaska (2006–2009)
- Mitt Romney, former governor of Massachusetts (2003–2007)

Organizations

- Judicial Watch
- NRA Political Victory Fund
- Tea Party movement

Newspapers

- Beloit Daily News
- Green Bay Press-Gazette
- Milwaukee Journal Sentinel

Labor unions

- Milwaukee Police Association
- Milwaukee Professional Firefighters Association

Individuals

- Herman Cain, radio host, former chairman of the Federal Reserve Bank of Kansas City and former candidate for president of the United States in 2012
- Rush Limbaugh, radio host
- Michelle Malkin, author, blogger and commentator
- Michael Reagan, radio and television host

=== Results ===
Republican primary results
| Party | Candidate | Votes | % |
|---|---|---|---|
| Republican | Scott Walker (incumbent) | 626,962 | 96.88% |
| Republican | Arthur Kohl-Riggs | 19,939 | 3.08% |
| Republican | Patrick J. O'Brien (write-in) | 17 | 0.00% |
| Republican | Scattering | 204 | 0.03% |
| Total votes | | 647,122 | 100.00% |

== Democratic primary ==
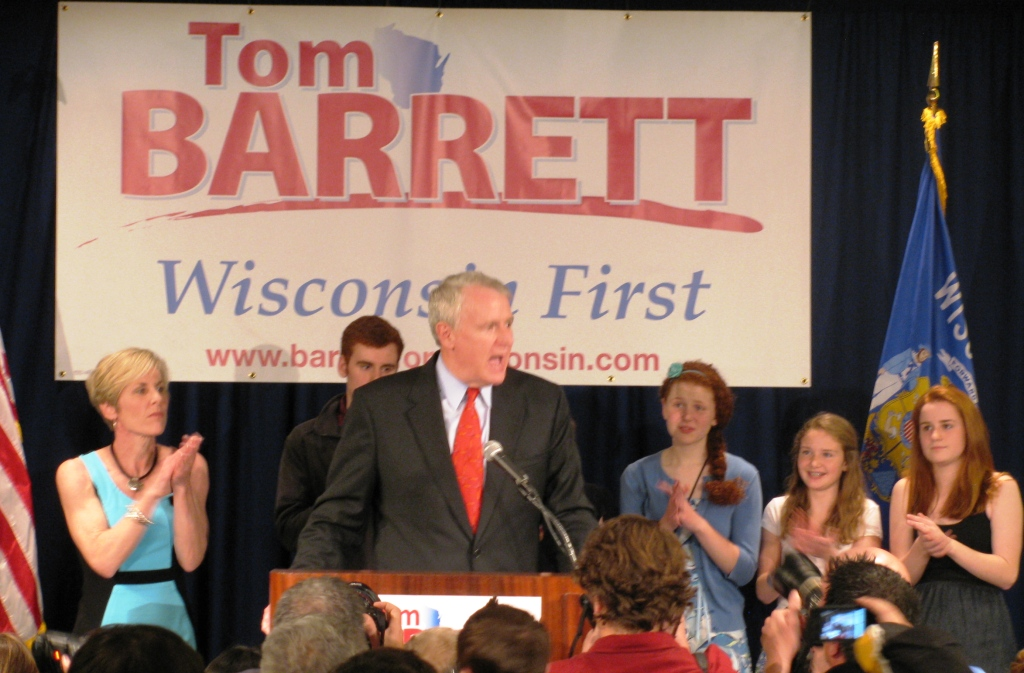
Barrett celebrating his May 8 victory in the Democratic primary

=== Candidates ===
==== Declared ====
- Tom Barrett, mayor of Milwaukee, former U.S. representative, candidate for governor in 2002 and nominee in 2010
- Kathleen Falk, former Dane County executive, candidate for governor in 2002 and nominee for attorney general in 2006
- Gladys Huber, activist
- Douglas La Follette, Wisconsin secretary of state, candidate for WI-01 in 1970
- Kathleen Vinehout, state senator

==== Declined ====
- Peter W. Barca, state assembly minority leader
- Tim Cullen, state senator
- Jon Erpenbach, state senator
- Russ Feingold, former U.S. senator
- Ron Kind, U.S. representative
- Dave Obey, former U.S. representative

=== Endorsements ===
Tom Barrett

Executive branch officials

- Bill Clinton, 42nd president of the United States (1993–2001)
- Hillary Clinton, United States secretary of state (2009–2013)
- Barack Obama, 44th president of the United States (2009–2017)

U.S. Senators

- Russ Feingold, former U.S. senator from Wisconsin (1993–2011)
- Herb Kohl, U.S. senator from Wisconsin (1989–2013)

U.S. Representatives

- Steve Kagen, former U.S. representative for Wisconsin's 8th congressional district (2007–2011)
- Ron Kind, U.S. representative for Wisconsin's 3rd congressional district
- Dennis Kucinich, U.S. representative from Ohio's 10th congressional district (1997–2013)
- Dave Obey, former U.S. representative from Wisconsin's 7th congressional district (1969–2011)

Statewide officials

- Douglas La Follette, Wisconsin secretary of state (1975–1979; 1983–2023) and gubernatorial candidate
- Martin O'Malley, governor of Maryland (2007–2015)

State legislators

- Terese Berceau, state representative (1999–2019)
- Tim Cullen, state senator from the 15th district (1975–1987; 2011–2015)
- Jon Erpenbach, state senator from the 27th district (1999–2023)
- Tony Staskunas, state representative from the 10th district (1997–2013)
- Kathleen Vinehout, state senator from the 31st district (2007–2019)

Local officials

- Kathleen Falk, former Dane County executive (1997–2011)
- Tom Nelson, Outagamie County executive (2011–present)
- Nancy Nusbaum, former county executive of Brown County (1995–2003)

Individuals

- Arthur Kohl-Riggs, political activist
- Webster Tarpley, author, historian and journalist

Newspapers

- The Capital Times

Organizations

- Sierra Club
Kathleen Falk

Statewide officials

- Vel Phillips, former Wisconsin secretary of state

State legislators

- Brett Hulsey, Wisconsin state assemblyman from the 77th district
- Sondy Pope-Roberts, Wisconsin state assemblywoman
- Christine Sinicki, Wisconsin state assemblywoman
- Chris Taylor, Wisconsin state assemblywoman

Local officials

- Richard J. Phelps, former Dane County executive

Organizations

- EMILY's List
- Sierra Club
- Wisconsin Education Association Council
- Women's Campaign Fund

=== Polling ===
| Poll source | Date(s) administered | Sample size | Margin of error | Tom Barrett | Kathleen Falk | Doug La Follette | Kathleen Vinehout | Undecided |
|---|---|---|---|---|---|---|---|---|
| Marquette University | April 26–29, 2012 | 451 | ± 4% | 48% | 21% | 8% | 6% | 19% |
| Public Policy Polling | April 13–15, 2012 | 810 | ± 3.4% | 38% | 24% | 9% | 6% | 22% |
| Marquette University | March 22–25, 2012 | 373 | ± 5.1% | — | 54% | 15% | 12% | 19% |
| Marquette University | March 22–25, 2012 | 373 | ± 5.1% | 36% | 29% | 8% | 8% | 18% |
| Public Policy Polling | February 23–26, 2012 | 425 | | 45% | 18% | 14% | 6% | 17% |
| Public Policy Polling | February 23–26, 2012 | 425 | | — | 41% | 23% | 13% | 22% |

=== Results ===
Primary results by county: Barrett: 30–40%; 40–50%; 50–60%; 60–70%; 70–80%; Falk: 30–40%; 40–50%; 50–60%

Democratic gubernatorial primary results
| Party | Candidate | Votes | % |
|---|---|---|---|
| Democratic | Tom Barrett | 390,191 | 58.10% |
| Democratic | Kathleen Falk | 229,236 | 34.13% |
| Democratic | Kathleen Vinehout | 26,967 | 4.02% |
| Democratic | Douglas La Follette | 19,497 | 2.90% |
| Democratic | Gladys Huber | 4,847 | 0.72% |
| Democratic | Scattering | 864 | 0.13% |
| Total votes | | 671,602 | 100.00% |

== General election ==
=== Candidates ===
- Tom Barrett (Democratic), mayor of Milwaukee
- Nathan Graewin (Libertarian)
- Hariprasad Trivedi (Independent)
- Scott Walker (Republican), incumbent governor
- Steven Zelinski (write-in)

=== Campaign ===
In April, the Milwaukee Police Association and Milwaukee Professional Firefighters Association unions endorsed Governor Walker in the recall election. After Barrett won the Democratic primary, Walker stated, "As Milwaukee Mayor Tom Barrett enters the general election in his soon to be third statewide losing campaign, he will surely find that his record of raising taxes and promises to continue to do so will not resonate with voters." After his primary victory, Barrett said, "We cannot fix Wisconsin with Walker as governor, this election is not about fighting past battles, it is about moving forward together to create jobs and get our economy moving again."

=== Debates ===
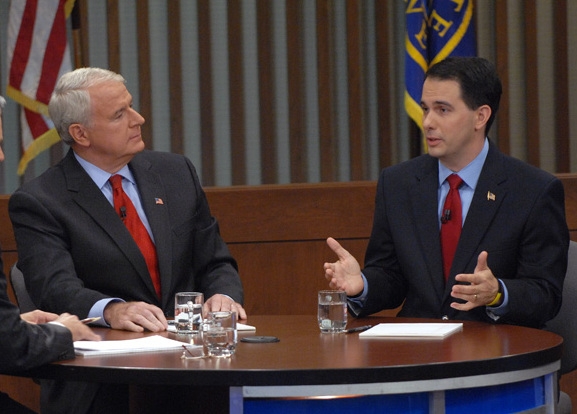
Barrett (left) and Walker (right) debating on May 31

- Complete video of debate, May 25, 2012 - C-SPAN
- Complete video of debate, May 31, 2012 - C-SPAN

=== Polls ===
Key
| DV | Decided voters |
| LV | Likely voters |
| RV | Registered voters |

| Poll source | Date(s) administered | Sample size | Margin of error | Scott Walker (R) | Tom Barrett (D) | Other | Undecided |
|---|---|---|---|---|---|---|---|
| We Ask America | June 3, 2012 | 1,570 LV | ± 2.5% | 54% | 42% | — | 4% |
| Public Policy Polling | June 2–3, 2012 | 1,226 LV | ± 2.8% | 50% | 47% | — | 3% |
| Angus Reid Public Opinion | May 30 – June 2, 2012 | 507 DV | ± 4.4% | 53% | 47% | — | — |
| Marquette University | May 23–26, 2012 | 600 LV | ± 4.1% | 52% | 45% | — | 3% |
| We Ask America | May 23, 2012 | 1,409 LV | ± 2.61% | 54% | 42% | — | 4% |
| St. Norbert College | May 17–22, 2012 | 406 LV | ± 5% | 50% | 45% | — | 5% |
| Reason-Rupe | May 14–18, 2012 | 609 LV | ± 4% | 50% | 42% | — | 6% |
| We Ask America | May 13, 2012 | 1,219 LV | ± 2.81% | 52% | 43% | — | 5% |
| Public Policy Polling | May 11–13, 2012 | 833 LV | ± 3.4% | 50% | 45% | 2% | 3% |
| Marquette University | May 9–12, 2012 | 600 LV | ± 4.1% | 50% | 44% | — | 3% |
| Rasmussen Reports | May 9, 2012 | 500 LV | ± 4.5% | 50% | 45% | 2% | 2% |
| Marquette University | April 26–29, 2012 | 705 RV | ± 4% | 46% | 47% | 3% | 4% |
| Marquette University | April 26–29, 2012 | 628 LV | ± 4% | 47% | 46% | 3% | 4% |
| Public Policy Polling | April 13–15, 2012 | 1,136 | ± 2.9% | 50% | 45% | 2% | 3% |
| Marquette University | March 22–25, 2012 | 707 | ± 3.7% | 47% | 45% | 3% | 5% |
| Public Policy Polling | February 23–26, 2012 | 900 | ± 3.3% | 46% | 49% | — | 5% |
| Marquette University | January 19–22, 2012 | 701 | ± 3.7% | 50% | 44% | 2% | 4% |
| Public Policy Polling | October 20–23, 2011 | 1,170 | ± 2.9% | 48% | 46% | — | 6% |

Hypothetical polling

| Poll source | Date(s) administered | Sample size | Margin of error | Scott Walker (R) | Generic Democrat | Other | Undecided |
|---|---|---|---|---|---|---|---|
| Marist | March 26–27, 2012 | 2,792 | ± 1.9% | 46% | 48% | — | 6% |

| Poll source | Date(s) administered | Sample size | Margin of error | Scott Walker (R) | Kathleen Falk (D) | Other | Undecided |
|---|---|---|---|---|---|---|---|
| Marquette University | April 26–29, 2012 | 705 | ± 4% | 49% | 42% | 6% | 3% |
| Public Policy Polling | April 13–15, 2012 | 1136 | ± 2.9% | 50% | 43% | 3% | 3% |
| Marquette University | March 22–25, 2012 | 707 | ± 3.7% | 49% | 45% | 2% | 5% |
| Public Policy Polling | February 23–26, 2012 | 900 | ± 3.3% | 47% | 48% | — | 5% |
| Marquette University | January 19–22, 2012 | 701 | ± 3.7% | 49% | 42% | 2% | 6% |
| Public Policy Polling | October 20–23, 2011 | 1,170 | ± 2.9% | 49% | 41% | — | 10% |

| Poll source | Date(s) administered | Sample size | Margin of error | Scott Walker (R) | Doug La Follette (D) | Other | Undecided |
|---|---|---|---|---|---|---|---|
| Marquette University | April 26–29, 2012 | 705 | ± 4% | 49% | 40% | 7% | 4% |
| Public Policy Polling | April 13–15, 2012 | 1136 | ± 2.9% | 51% | 40% | 3% | 6% |
| Marquette University | March 22–25, 2012 | 707 | ± 3.7% | 49% | 42% | 3% | 6% |
| Public Policy Polling | February 23–26, 2012 | 900 | ± 3.3% | 46% | 45% | — | 9% |

| Poll source | Date(s) administered | Sample size | Margin of error | Scott Walker (R) | Kathleen Vinehout (D) | Other | Undecided |
|---|---|---|---|---|---|---|---|
| Marquette University | April 26–29, 2012 | 705 | ± 4% | 49% | 40% | 6% | 5% |
| Public Policy Polling | April 13–15, 2012 | 1136 | ± 2.9% | 50% | 38% | 5% | 7% |
| Marquette University | March 22–25, 2012 | 707 | ± 3.7% | 49% | 41% | 3% | 6% |
| Public Policy Polling | February 23–26, 2012 | 900 | ± 3.3% | 46% | 44% | — | 10% |

| Poll source | Date(s) administered | Sample size | Margin of error | Scott Walker (R) | Peter Barca (D) | Other | Undecided |
|---|---|---|---|---|---|---|---|
| Public Policy Polling | February 23–26, 2012 | 900 | ± 3.3% | 48% | 46% | — | 7% |
| Public Policy Polling | October 20–23, 2011 | 1,170 | ± 2.9% | 48% | 42% | — | 10% |

| Poll source | Date(s) administered | Sample size | Margin of error | Scott Walker (R) | Tim Cullen (D) | Other | Undecided |
|---|---|---|---|---|---|---|---|
| Marquette University | January 19–22, 2012 | 701 | ± 3.7% | 50% | 40% | 3% | 7% |

| Poll source | Date(s) administered | Sample size | Margin of error | Scott Walker (R) | Jon Erpenbach (D) | Other | Undecided |
|---|---|---|---|---|---|---|---|
| Public Policy Polling | February 23–26, 2012 | 900 | ± 3.3% | 47% | 44% | — | 9% |
| Public Policy Polling | October 20–23, 2011 | 1,170 | ± 2.9% | 47% | 40% | — | 13% |

| Poll source | Date(s) administered | Sample size | Margin of error | Scott Walker (R) | Russ Feingold (D) | Other | Undecided |
|---|---|---|---|---|---|---|---|
| Public Policy Polling | February 23–26, 2012 | 900 | ± 3.3% | 45% | 52% | — | 4% |
| Public Policy Polling | October 20–23, 2011 | 1,170 | ± 2.9% | 46% | 49% | — | 5% |

| Poll source | Date(s) administered | Sample size | Margin of error | Scott Walker (R) | Steve Kagen (D) | Other | Undecided |
|---|---|---|---|---|---|---|---|
| Public Policy Polling | October 20–23, 2011 | 1,170 | ± 2.9% | 47% | 39% | — | 14% |

| Poll source | Date(s) administered | Sample size | Margin of error | Scott Walker (R) | Ron Kind (D) | Other | Undecided |
|---|---|---|---|---|---|---|---|
| Public Policy Polling | February 23–26, 2012 | 900 | ± 3.3% | 45% | 46% | — | 9% |
| Public Policy Polling | October 20–23, 2011 | 1,170 | ± 2.9% | 47% | 41% | — | 12% |

| Poll source | Date(s) administered | Sample size | Margin of error | Scott Walker (R) | David Obey (D) | Other | Undecided |
|---|---|---|---|---|---|---|---|
| Public Policy Polling | February 23–26, 2012 | 900 | ± 3.3% | 47% | 45% | — | 7% |
| Marquette University | January 19–22, 2012 | 701 | ± 3.7% | 49% | 43% | 3% | 6% |
| Public Policy Polling | October 20–23, 2011 | 1,170 | ± 2.9% | 47% | 42% | — | 10% |

=== Predictions ===
| Source | Ranking | As of |
|---|---|---|
| Sabato's Crystal Ball | Lean R | May 29, 2012 |

=== Results ===
2012 Wisconsin gubernatorial recall election
| Party | Candidate | Votes | % | ±% |
|---|---|---|---|---|
| Republican | Scott Walker (incumbent) | 1,335,585 | 53.08% | +0.84% |
| Democratic | Tom Barrett | 1,164,480 | 46.28% | −0.20% |
| Independent | Hari Trivedi | 14,463 | 0.57% | |
| | Scattering | 1,537 | 0.06% | |
| Majority | | 171,105 | 6.80% | |
| Total votes | | 2,516,065 | 100.00% | |
| Republican hold | | Swing | +1.03% | |

==== By county ====
| County | Scott Walker Republican | | Tom Barrett Democratic | | Hari Trivedi Independent | | Scattering Write-in | | Margin | | Total votes cast |
| County | # | % | # | % | # | % | # | % | # | % | Total votes cast |
|---|---|---|---|---|---|---|---|---|---|---|---|
| Adams | 4,497 | 54.44% | 3,658 | 44.29% | 97 | 1.17% | 8 | 0.10% | 839 | 10.16% | 8,260 |
| Ashland | 2,598 | 38.05% | 4,174 | 61.14% | 50 | 0.73% | 5 | 0.07% | -1,576 | -23.08% | 6,827 |
| Barron | 10,420 | 59.26% | 7,015 | 39.89% | 136 | 0.77% | 13 | 0.07% | 3,405 | 19.36% | 17,584 |
| Bayfield | 3,269 | 39.79% | 4,889 | 59.51% | 55 | 0.67% | 3 | 0.04% | -1,620 | -19.72% | 8,216 |
| Brown | 61,969 | 59.65% | 41,238 | 39.69% | 619 | 0.60% | 67 | 0.06% | 20,731 | 19.95% | 103,893 |
| Buffalo | 3,403 | 60.78% | 2,148 | 38.36% | 44 | 0.79% | 4 | 0.07% | 1,255 | 22.41% | 5,599 |
| Burnett | 3,998 | 60.80% | 2,536 | 38.56% | 40 | 0.61% | 2 | 0.03% | 1,462 | 22.23% | 6,576 |
| Calumet | 15,004 | 66.28% | 7,515 | 33.20% | 107 | 0.47% | 12 | 0.05% | 7,489 | 33.08% | 22,638 |
| Chippewa | 14,877 | 58.21% | 10,419 | 40.77% | 244 | 0.95% | 16 | 0.06% | 4,458 | 17.44% | 25,556 |
| Clark | 8,133 | 68.63% | 3,618 | 30.53% | 86 | 0.73% | 14 | 0.12% | 4,515 | 38.10% | 11,851 |
| Columbia | 12,912 | 49.34% | 13,070 | 49.94% | 161 | 0.62% | 29 | 0.11% | -158 | -0.60% | 26,172 |
| Crawford | 3,357 | 51.00% | 3,160 | 48.01% | 61 | 0.93% | 4 | 0.06% | 197 | 2.99% | 6,582 |
| Dane | 77,595 | 30.38% | 176,407 | 69.07% | 1,239 | 0.49% | 175 | 0.07% | -98,812 | -38.69% | 255,416 |
| Dodge | 24,851 | 63.60% | 13,958 | 35.72% | 242 | 0.62% | 20 | 0.05% | 10,893 | 27.88% | 39,071 |
| Door | 8,401 | 56.80% | 6,308 | 42.65% | 75 | 0.51% | 7 | 0.05% | 2,093 | 14.15% | 14,791 |
| Douglas | 6,374 | 35.02% | 11,711 | 64.35% | 106 | 0.58% | 8 | 0.04% | -5,337 | -29.33% | 18,199 |
| Dunn | 8,417 | 53.84% | 7,099 | 45.41% | 114 | 0.73% | 3 | 0.02% | 1,318 | 8.43% | 15,633 |
| Eau Claire | 20,740 | 49.75% | 20,595 | 49.41% | 325 | 0.78% | 25 | 0.06% | 145 | 0.35% | 41,685 |
| Florence | 1,338 | 64.76% | 717 | 34.70% | 10 | 0.48% | 1 | 0.05% | 621 | 30.06% | 2,066 |
| Fond du Lac | 29,060 | 63.89% | 16,105 | 35.41% | 309 | 0.68% | 9 | 0.02% | 12,955 | 28.48% | 45,483 |
| Forest | 2,180 | 58.76% | 1,485 | 40.03% | 44 | 1.19% | 1 | 0.03% | 695 | 18.73% | 3,710 |
| Grant | 9,498 | 51.97% | 8,623 | 47.18% | 137 | 0.75% | 17 | 0.09% | 875 | 4.79% | 18,275 |
| Green | 8,407 | 51.02% | 7,981 | 48.43% | 71 | 0.43% | 19 | 0.12% | 426 | 2.59% | 16,478 |
| Green Lake | 5,800 | 68.84% | 2,564 | 30.43% | 54 | 0.64% | 7 | 0.08% | 3,236 | 38.41% | 8,425 |
| Iowa | 4,957 | 46.33% | 5,660 | 52.90% | 77 | 0.72% | 5 | 0.05% | -703 | -6.57% | 10,699 |
| Iron | 1,613 | 55.72% | 1,267 | 43.77% | 14 | 0.48% | 1 | 0.03% | 346 | 11.95% | 2,895 |
| Jackson | 4,074 | 53.55% | 3,466 | 45.56% | 62 | 0.81% | 6 | 0.08% | 608 | 7.99% | 7,608 |
| Jefferson | 22,475 | 59.97% | 14,698 | 39.22% | 274 | 0.73% | 31 | 0.08% | 7,777 | 20.75% | 37,478 |
| Juneau | 5,429 | 55.66% | 4,225 | 43.32% | 83 | 0.85% | 16 | 0.16% | 1,204 | 12.34% | 9,753 |
| Kenosha | 28,935 | 49.07% | 29,638 | 50.27% | 349 | 0.59% | 39 | 0.07% | -703 | -1.19% | 58,961 |
| Kewaunee | 6,108 | 64.01% | 3,388 | 35.51% | 42 | 0.44% | 4 | 0.04% | 2,720 | 28.51% | 9,542 |
| La Crosse | 22,608 | 47.43% | 24,651 | 51.72% | 382 | 0.80% | 22 | 0.05% | -2,043 | -4.29% | 47,663 |
| Lafayette | 3,887 | 56.68% | 2,923 | 42.62% | 46 | 0.67% | 2 | 0.03% | 964 | 14.06% | 6,858 |
| Langlade | 5,621 | 65.43% | 2,898 | 33.73% | 71 | 0.83% | 1 | 0.01% | 2,723 | 31.70% | 8,591 |
| Lincoln | 7,201 | 56.86% | 5,351 | 42.25% | 106 | 0.84% | 6 | 0.05% | 1,850 | 14.61% | 12,664 |
| Manitowoc | 23,085 | 64.02% | 12,682 | 35.17% | 268 | 0.74% | 26 | 0.07% | 10,403 | 28.85% | 36,061 |
| Marathon | 36,352 | 62.03% | 21,809 | 37.22% | 398 | 0.68% | 42 | 0.07% | 14,543 | 24.82% | 58,601 |
| Marinette | 10,267 | 61.84% | 6,242 | 37.60% | 90 | 0.54% | 4 | 0.02% | 4,025 | 24.24% | 16,603 |
| Marquette | 4,102 | 59.23% | 2,764 | 39.91% | 55 | 0.79% | 5 | 0.07% | 1,338 | 19.32% | 6,926 |
| Menominee | 208 | 26.46% | 575 | 73.16% | 3 | 0.38% | 0 | 0.00% | -367 | -46.69% | 786 |
| Milwaukee | 143,455 | 36.21% | 250,476 | 63.22% | 1,935 | 0.49% | 317 | 0.08% | -107,021 | -27.01% | 396,183 |
| Monroe | 9,064 | 59.14% | 6,093 | 39.76% | 155 | 1.01% | 14 | 0.09% | 2,971 | 19.39% | 15,326 |
| Oconto | 11,049 | 65.24% | 5,782 | 34.14% | 102 | 0.60% | 4 | 0.02% | 5,267 | 31.10% | 16,937 |
| Oneida | 10,433 | 58.08% | 7,365 | 41.00% | 147 | 0.82% | 17 | 0.09% | 3,068 | 17.08% | 17,962 |
| Outagamie | 47,840 | 61.28% | 29,714 | 38.06% | 466 | 0.60% | 42 | 0.05% | 18,126 | 23.22% | 78,062 |
| Ozaukee | 34,303 | 70.64% | 14,095 | 29.03% | 141 | 0.29% | 21 | 0.04% | 20,208 | 41.61% | 48,560 |
| Pepin | 1,849 | 59.99% | 1,216 | 39.45% | 17 | 0.55% | 0 | 0.00% | 633 | 20.54% | 3,082 |
| Pierce | 8,317 | 54.99% | 6,744 | 44.59% | 59 | 0.39% | 4 | 0.03% | 1,573 | 10.40% | 15,124 |
| Polk | 10,133 | 60.18% | 6,593 | 39.15% | 106 | 0.63% | 7 | 0.04% | 3,540 | 21.02% | 16,839 |
| Portage | 14,846 | 48.23% | 15,672 | 50.91% | 242 | 0.79% | 22 | 0.07% | -826 | -2.68% | 30,782 |
| Price | 4,083 | 59.95% | 2,651 | 38.92% | 73 | 1.07% | 4 | 0.06% | 1,432 | 21.02% | 6,811 |
| Racine | 45,526 | 52.72% | 40,287 | 46.65% | 509 | 0.59% | 29 | 0.03% | 5,239 | 6.07% | 86,351 |
| Richland | 3,895 | 53.74% | 3,296 | 45.47% | 53 | 0.73% | 4 | 0.06% | 599 | 8.26% | 7,248 |
| Rock | 27,498 | 43.40% | 35,316 | 55.74% | 475 | 0.75% | 69 | 0.11% | -7,818 | -12.34% | 63,358 |
| Rusk | 3,722 | 62.51% | 2,167 | 36.40% | 60 | 1.01% | 5 | 0.08% | 1,555 | 26.12% | 5,954 |
| Sauk | 13,648 | 51.21% | 12,815 | 48.09% | 168 | 0.63% | 18 | 0.07% | 833 | 3.13% | 26,649 |
| Sawyer | 3,999 | 56.44% | 3,038 | 42.88% | 45 | 0.64% | 3 | 0.04% | 961 | 13.56% | 7,085 |
| Shawano | 11,201 | 66.11% | 5,646 | 33.33% | 88 | 0.52% | 7 | 0.04% | 5,555 | 32.79% | 16,942 |
| Sheboygan | 34,047 | 64.30% | 18,612 | 35.15% | 279 | 0.53% | 15 | 0.03% | 15,435 | 29.15% | 52,953 |
| St. Croix | 20,894 | 61.08% | 13,177 | 38.52% | 124 | 0.36% | 12 | 0.04% | 7,717 | 22.56% | 34,207 |
| Taylor | 5,751 | 71.60% | 2,201 | 27.40% | 76 | 0.95% | 4 | 0.05% | 3,550 | 44.20% | 8,032 |
| Trempealeau | 6,266 | 57.01% | 4,634 | 42.16% | 88 | 0.80% | 4 | 0.04% | 1,632 | 14.85% | 10,992 |
| Vernon | 6,352 | 51.97% | 5,762 | 47.14% | 100 | 0.82% | 9 | 0.07% | 590 | 4.83% | 12,223 |
| Vilas | 7,300 | 63.29% | 4,154 | 36.02% | 72 | 0.62% | 8 | 0.07% | 3,146 | 27.28% | 11,534 |
| Walworth | 26,221 | 64.28% | 14,346 | 35.17% | 202 | 0.50% | 21 | 0.05% | 11,875 | 29.11% | 40,790 |
| Washburn | 4,278 | 56.96% | 3,156 | 42.02% | 59 | 0.79% | 17 | 0.23% | 1,122 | 14.94% | 7,510 |
| Washington | 52,306 | 75.60% | 16,634 | 24.04% | 246 | 0.36% | 0 | 0.00% | 35,672 | 51.56% | 69,186 |
| Waukesha | 154,316 | 72.34% | 58,234 | 27.30% | 706 | 0.33% | 76 | 0.04% | 96,082 | 45.04% | 213,332 |
| Waupaca | 14,094 | 64.65% | 7,564 | 34.70% | 128 | 0.59% | 13 | 0.06% | 6,530 | 29.96% | 21,799 |
| Waushara | 6,463 | 62.80% | 3,754 | 36.47% | 69 | 0.67% | 6 | 0.06% | 2,709 | 26.32% | 10,292 |
| Winnebago | 39,881 | 55.96% | 30,885 | 43.33% | 446 | 0.63% | 60 | 0.08% | 8,996 | 12.62% | 71,272 |
| Wood | 18,535 | 57.90% | 13,171 | 41.14% | 281 | 0.88% | 26 | 0.08% | 5,364 | 16.76% | 32,013 |
| Total | 1,335,585 | 53.08% | 1,164,480 | 46.28% | 14,463 | 0.57% | 1,537 | 0.06% | 171,105 | 6.80% | 2,516,065 |

Counties that flipped from Democratic to Republican

- Crawford (largest city: Prairie du Chien)
- Eau Claire (largest city: Eau Claire)
- Green (largest municipality: Monroe)
- Trempealeau (largest city: Arcadia)

Counties that flipped from Republican to Democratic

- Columbia (largest city: Portage)
- Kenosha (largest city: Kenosha)
- La Crosse (largest city: La Crosse)

==== By congressional district ====
Walker won six of eight congressional districts, including one that was represented by a Democrat.

| District | Walker | Barrett | Representative |
|---|---|---|---|
| 1st | 57% | 42% | Paul Ryan |
| 2nd | 35% | 64% | Tammy Baldwin |
| 3rd | 52% | 47% | Ron Kind |
| 4th | 28% | 72% | Gwen Moore |
| 5th | 68% | 32% | Jim Sensenbrenner |
| 6th | 62% | 38% | Tom Petri |
| 7th | 59% | 40% | Sean Duffy |
| 8th | 62% | 38% | Reid Ribble |

== Analysis ==
Despite the protests, which followed shortly after Walker's inauguration, Walker's margin of victory in the recall election increased by 1 percentage point compared to the previous election (6.8% vs 5.8%). Approximately 350,000 more people voted in the recall election than in the 2010 election (2.5 million vs 2.15 million), making voter turnout in the recall 57.8%, the highest for a Wisconsin gubernatorial election not on a presidential ballot. The Republican bastions of Ozaukee, Waukesha, and Washington had the highest turnouts in the state, at 74%, 72%, and 70% respectively. The Democratic bastion of Dane was not far behind, at 67% voter turnout. Menominee had the lowest turnout in the state, with only 28% voter turnout. Walker won 60 counties in the recall election, compared to 59 in 2010. Three counties flipped from Walker to Barrett in the recall election (Columbia, Kenosha, and La Crosse), while four counties flipped from Barrett to Walker in the recall election (Crawford, Eau Claire, Green, and Trempealeau). Walker's margin of victory increased in 54 counties, while it decreased in 18 counties. Walker did better in most of northern Wisconsin, while Barrett did better in southeast Wisconsin and the most northern counties in the state. Twelve counties (Buffalo, Calumet, Clark, Door, Forest, Kewaunee, Outagamie, Pepin, Price, Rusk, Taylor, and Trempealeau) had swings towards Walker by six points or more compared to the last election, while six counties (Columbia, Dodge, Douglas, Kenosha, Racine, and Rock) had swings towards Barrett by two points or more. The Democratic strongholds of Dane County and Milwaukee County went more to Barrett in the recall election, while the Republican strongholds of Waukesha, Ozaukee, and Washington went more Walker.

Craig Gilbert of the Milwaukee Journal Sentinel noted the similarities between the 2010 and 2012 elections while looking at the exit poll numbers.

== Aftermath ==
=== 2014 Wisconsin Supreme Court ruling ===
On July 31, 2014, Scott Bauer reported for the Associated Press:

The Wisconsin Supreme Court on Thursday [July 31, 2014] upheld the 2011 law that effectively ended collective bargaining for most [Wisconsin] public workers, sparked massive protests and led to Republican Gov. Scott Walker's recall election and rise to national prominence. The 5-2 ruling upholds Walker's signature policy achievement in its entirety and is a major victory for the potential 2016 GOP presidential candidate, who is seeking re-election this year. The ruling also marks the end of the three-year legal fight over the law, which prohibits public-employee unions from collectively bargaining for anything beyond wage increases based on inflation. A federal appeals court twice upheld the law as constitutional. "No matter the limitations or 'burdens' a legislative enactment places on the collective-bargaining process, collective bargaining remains a creation of legislative grace and not constitutional obligation", Justice Michael Gableman wrote.

Chief Justice Shirley Abrahamson and Justice Ann Walsh Bradley dissented from the ruling, arguing the law unconstitutionally infringes on protected rights.

=== Investigation of alleged illegal campaign coordination ===
In August 2012, the first investigation, which had been launched by John Chisholm, Milwaukee County District Attorney, a Democrat, into missing funds, was rolled into a second John Doe probe based on a theory that Governor Walker's campaign had illegally coordinated with conservative groups engaged in issue advocacy during the recall elections. The initial John Doe judge, now retired Kenosha County Circuit Judge Barbara A. Kluka, overseeing the John Doe investigation issued 30 subpoenas and 5 search warrants. She also issued a secrecy order which meant that those being investigated were legally bound from discussing any facet of the investigation publicly. Shortly thereafter, she recused herself from the investigation. Kluka's replacement, Judge Gregory Peterson, quashed several subpoenas in January 2014, saying "there was no probable cause shown that they violated campaign finance laws".

The special prosecutor took the unusual step of filing a supervisory writ, essentially appealing Judge Peterson's decision, with the same appeals court that had denied a motion to stop the investigation. On July 16, 2015, the Wisconsin Supreme Court closed the investigation into whether Governor Walker's campaign had illegally coordinated with outside groups by a 4–2 vote. Justice Michael J. Gableman in writing for the majority stated, "To be clear, this conclusion ends the John Doe investigation because the special prosecutor's legal theory is unsupported in either reason or law. Consequently, the investigation is closed."

The director of Wisconsin Club for Growth (the Wisconsin arm of the national Club for Growth), Eric O'Keefe, defied the gag order, and filed a lawsuit alleging the probe was partisan and violated First Amendment rights to free expression. In a May 6, 2014 order, Judge Rudolph T. Randa found the investigation had no legal basis.

One day later, a three-judge panel (Wood, Bauer and Easterbrook) of the United States Court of Appeals for the Seventh Circuit in Chicago stayed Judge Randa's preliminary injunction, ruling he had overstepped his authority as prosecutors had already appealed an earlier decision in the case. Randa could issue his injunction only if he certified their appeal as frivolous. The appeals court also ruled that Judge Randa could not order prosecutors to destroy evidence collected in the five-county probe. Judge Randa quickly certified the appeal as frivolous and the appeals court upheld the preliminary injunction ruling that he did have the authority to issue the injunction.

At the request of the Wisconsin Club for Growth, the court unsealed documents from the investigation on June 19, 2014. These documents reveal the prosecutors' theory that Governor Walker was at the center of a plan to illegally coordinate fundraising efforts with a number of outside conservative groups to help him in the 2012 recall election, bypassing state election laws. A theory that had been ruled as having no legal basis by two judges.

According to a statement by prosecutors "At the time the investigation was halted, Governor Walker was not a target of the investigation. At no time has he been served with a subpoena", and that they have "no conclusions as to whether there is sufficient evidence to charge anyone with a crime". To date, no one has been charged in the investigation. The probe has been effectively shut down with Judge Peterson's quashing of subpoenas until the Wisconsin Supreme Court rules on whether the investigation was legal.

On August 21, 2014, a number of email messages were disclosed from a previous court filing by a special prosecutor. According to Politico, the emails purports to show that Walker made an early decision for money to be funneled though a group he trusted, and shows that he had a direct hand in "orchestrating the fundraising logistics of the opposition to the recalls". According to CBS News, the disclosures show that prosecutors claimed that Walker "personally solicited donations for [the] conservative group Wisconsin Club for Growth to get around campaign finance limits and disclosure requirements as he fended off the recall attempt in 2012."

One of the emails released read, "As the Governor discussed ... he wants all the issue advocacy efforts run through one group to ensure correct messaging. We had some past problems with multiple groups doing work on 'behalf' of Gov. Walker and it caused some issues ... The Governor is encouraging all to invest in the Wisconsin Club for Growth." The Washington Post reported that the documents released show Walker solicited donors such as Home Depot co-founder Ken Langone, hedge fund manager Paul Singer, and real estate businessman Donald Trump to give large contributions to a tax-exempt group that backed him during the recall efforts.

Wisconsin Club for Growth reportedly only ran issues ads, none of which had to do with the recall attempt. According to a The Wall Street Journal editorial (August 24, 2014), it is "legal and common" for politicians to raise money for political action committees, party committees, and 501(c)(4)'s. There are no allegations that the Wisconsin Club for Growth gave the money to Walker, or even advertised on his behalf.

In September 2014, lawyers asked a federal appeals court to uphold an injunction that blocks a Wisconsin prosecutor from reviving an investigation that targeted conservative organizations accused of illegally coordinating with the governor for the purpose of circumventing campaign finance limits, citing selective prosecution and violations of free speech and equal protection under the law. On September 9, 2014, the Seventh Circuit heard oral arguments on the appeal. During arguments, Judge Frank Easterbrook questioned the constitutionality of the secrecy orders, stating it's "screaming with unconstitutionality". Judge Diane Wood focused in on why the suit was filed in federal court. O'Keefe's attorneys pointed to the fact that the Wisconsin Supreme Court had yet to take up the cases filed in state court. On September 24, 2014, the Seventh Circuit reversed Judge Randa's injunction order and dismissed the lawsuit, not based on the merits of the case, but ruling only on federal interference in a state case. O'Keefe filed an appeal with the U.S. Supreme Court on January 21, 2015.

Wisconsin's Government Accountability Board, or GAB, performed the functions of both a state elections and ethics board during this time period and was part of the investigation due to being "presented with facts that suggested there was a violation of the law as it had been applied for years". Although credited as a "model" for other states because "members are former judges chosen in a way to ensure they will not favor either major party" and "no other state has a chief election administration authority with the same degree of insulation from partisan politics" the GAB's being part of this investigation still drew the ire of some Wisconsin Republicans. In July 2015 Governor Walker called for the dismantling of the GAB. The state legislature, controlled by Republicans during the 2015–16 session, passed a law doing so—which Governor Walker signed—that ended the GAB in 2016 and split its functions between boards appointed by leaders of the major political parties.

In 2016, Salon.com declared that a majority of the Wisconsin Supreme Court justices who halted the investigation had been endorsed by the same conservative organizations that were being investigated. "Four of that court's seven justices were elected with $10 million in support (more than the jurists spent on their own campaigns) from Wisconsin Club for Growth and Wisconsin Manufacturers & Commerce, two of the 'independent' groups that Walker was accused of illegally coordinating with..." This led to some of the District Attorneys involved in the John Doe investigation appealing unsuccessfully to the U.S. Supreme Court.

The Guardian reported in September 2016 that there was strong evidence of illegal coordination, based on more than 1500 pages of leaked emails.

On October 3, 2016, the United States Supreme Court decided not to take the case despite urging by The New Yorker in order "to repair the rule of law in Wisconsin". Political and legal scholar Howard Schweber opined that this may have been due to the US Supreme Court trying to avoid "tie outcomes".

== See also ==
- 2011 Wisconsin protests
- 2011 Wisconsin Act 10
- Recall elections in Wisconsin
- 2012 Wisconsin lieutenant gubernatorial recall election
- Wisconsin Supreme Court election, 2011
- Wisconsin Senate recall elections, 2011
- Wisconsin Senate recall elections, 2012
