= 2009 Dane County Executive election =

- April 7, 2009
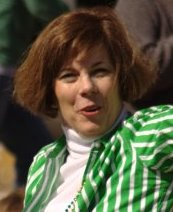

Nominee	Kathleen Falk	Nancy Mistele
Party	Nonpartisan	Nonpartisan
Popular vote	59,180	40,495
Percentage	59.30%	40.57%
County Executive before election
Kathleen Falk
Nonpartisan
Elected County Executive
Kathleen Falk
Nonpartisan

The 2009 Dane County Executive election took place on April 7, 2009. Incumbent County Executive Kathleen Falk ran for re-election to a fourth term. She was challenged by former Madison School Board member Nancy Mistele. Though the race was formally nonpartisan, Falk ran in the Democratic primary for Governor in 2002 and as the Democratic nominee for Attorney General in 2006, while Mistele ran for the legislature as a Republican.

During the campaign, Falk faced criticism over a mishandled 911 call from a homicide victim, and Mistele attacked her over mismanagement of the call center. In the lead-up to the election, Mistele outraised Falk, but Falk nonetheless won re-election in a landslide, receiving 59 percent of the vote to Mistele's 41 percent.

Falk would ultimately end up not serving her full term. In 2010, she announced that she would resign in 2011, which triggered a special election.

== General election ==
=== Candidates ===
- Kathleen Falk, incumbent County Executive
- Nancy Mistele, former Madison School Board member

=== Results ===
2009 Dane County Executive election
Party	Candidate	Votes	%
Nonpartisan	Kathleen Falk (inc.)	59,180	59.30%
Nonpartisan	Nancy Mistele	40,495	40.57%
Write-in		131	0.13%
Total votes		99,806	100.00%
