= 2011 Wisconsin Act 10 =

2011 Wisconsin legislation

100th Wisconsin Legislature
- Long title: An Act relating to: state finances, collective bargaining for public employees, compensation and fringe benefits of public employees, the state civil service system, the Medical Assistance program
- Territorial extent: Wisconsin
- Enacted: March 11, 2011
- Signed by: Scott Walker

Legislative history
- Bill title: 2011 JR1 Assembly Bill 11
- Introduced by: Committee on Assembly Organization, on behalf of the Governor
- Introduced: February 15, 2011
- Finally passed both chambers: March 10, 2011
- Status: In force

The 2011 Wisconsin Act 10, also known as the Wisconsin Budget Repair Bill or the Wisconsin Budget Adjustment Act, is a controversial law enacted by the 100th Wisconsin Legislature which significantly limited the rights and compensation of state and local government employees in Wisconsin. It was the signature act of Republican governor Scott Walker, who described it as a tool needed to address a projected $3.6 billion budget deficit. The introduction of this bill provoked immediate outrage from labor unions and their allies, and resulted in months of mass protests at the Wisconsin State Capitol. Democratic members of the Wisconsin Senate then fled the state to deny a quorum for the bill, remaining in Illinois for three weeks. Republicans in the legislature eventually stripped out budgetary items to circumvent budget-related quorum rules and passed the legislation on March 9, 2011. The law was signed by governor Walker on the morning of March 11 and was followed by a ceremonial signing later that day.

The legislation ended most collective bargaining rights for public employee labor unions, exempting certain public safety unions such as police, fire fighters, and sheriffs deputies. The law also made it much more difficult to certify and maintain a public employee union, and made it more difficult for unions to collect dues from members. The legislation also adjusted the public employee retirement system to shift the burden of contributions more onto employees, adjusted public employee health insurance plans to cap employer contributions, made it easier to fire employees who engaged in work stoppages or strikes, and enabled changes to state Medicaid programs.

The law was challenged in court, most notably in the case Madison Teachers Inc. v. Walker. The plaintiffs alleged that the law violated constitutional rights to association and equal protection, and separately charged that the law's rules for local government units violated the state constitution's home rule amendment and violated their rights to freely enter into contracts. Wisconsin circuit court judge Juan B. Colas initially heard the case and struck down several provisions of the law, but, on appeal, the Wisconsin Supreme Court overturned that ruling in a 5–2 decision in July 2014, upholding Act 10 in its entirety. Litigation against Act 10 continued after 2024, as Wisconsin circuit court judge Jacob Frost again struck down parts of the law where public safety unions were treated differently than other public employee unions.

== Legislation summary ==
- Pension contributions: Employees were forced to take a cut in take-home pay to maintain pension contributions at existing levels to ensure pension system viability. Pension contributions, however characterized, are part of total employee compensation. Statements made, such as 'Employees of Wisconsin Retirement System (WRS) employers, and the City and County of Milwaukee must contribute 50% of the annual pension payment' were framing devices used to justify the cut in take-home pay, as reduction in total compensation to public employees using these retirement systems was a policy goal for the Walker Administration, as tax increases to resolve the budget deficit were opposed by Governor Walker. The payment amount for WRS employees was estimated to be 5.8% of salary in 2011. 'State, school district and municipal employees who were members of the WRS generally paid little or nothing toward their pensions' was an additional framing device to reflect the policy goals of the Walker Administration, in reducing the power of public sector unions that were not political allies.
- Health insurance contributions: State employees must pay at least 12.6% of the average cost of annual premiums. In addition, the law requires changes to the plan design necessary to reduce current premiums by 5%. Local employers participating in the Public Employers Group Health insurance cannot pay more than 88% of the lowest cost plan. The law also authorizes the Department of Employee Trust Funds to use $28 million of excess balances in reserve accounts for health insurance and pharmacy benefits to reduce health insurance premium costs. State employees on average paid approximately 6% of annual health insurance premiums.
- Health insurance cost containment strategies: The law directs the Department of Employee Trust Funds and the Group Insurance Board to implement health risk assessments and similar programs aimed at participant wellness, collect certain data related to assessing health care provider quality and effectiveness, and verify the status of dependents participating in the state health insurance program. In addition, it modifies the membership of the Group Insurance Board to require that the representative of the Attorney General be an attorney to ensure the board has access to legal advice among its membership.
- Pension changes for elected officials and appointees: The law modifies the pension calculation for elected officials and appointees to be the same as general occupation employees and teachers. Previous law required these positions to pay more and receive a different multiplier for pension calculation than general classification employees. Under the state constitution, this change is effective for elected officials at the beginning of their next term of office.
- Modifications to Wisconsin Retirement System and state health insurance plans: The law directs the Department of Administration, Office of State Employment Relations and Department of Employee Trust Funds to study and report on possible changes to the Wisconsin Retirement System, including defined contribution plans and longer vesting periods. The three agencies must also study and report on changes to the current state health insurance plans, including health insurance purchasing exchanges, larger purchasing pools, and high-deductible insurance options.
- General fund impact: Authorizes the Department of Administration Secretary to lapse or transfer from GPR and PR appropriations (excluding PR appropriations to the University of Wisconsin) to the general fund estimated savings of approximately $30 million from implementing these provisions for state employees in the 2010–11 fiscal year. Segregated funds retain any savings from these measures.
- Collective Bargaining: The law limits collective bargaining for most public employees to wages. Total wage increases cannot exceed a cap based on the consumer price index (CPI) unless approved by referendum. Increases from the bargaining process for teachers are applied only to the base wages, and do not include the additional salary of teachers. Contracts are limited to one year and wages frozen until the new contract is settled. Collective bargaining units must take annual votes to maintain certification as a union. Employers cannot collect union dues, and members of collective bargaining units are not required to pay them. These changes take effect upon the expiration of existing contracts. Local law enforcement and fire employees, and state troopers and inspectors are exempt from these changes.
- Career executive transfers: The law allows state employees in the career executive positions to be reassigned between agencies upon agreement of agency heads.
- Limited term employees (LTE's): The law prohibits LTE's from being eligible for health insurance or participation in the Wisconsin Retirement System.
- State employee absences and other work actions: If the Governor has declared a state of emergency, the law authorizes appointing authorities to terminate any employees absent for three days without employer approval or any employees that participate in an organized action to stop or slow work.
- Quality Health Care Authority: The law repeals the authority of home health care workers under the Medicaid program to collectively bargain.
- Child care labor relations: The law repeals the authority of family child care workers to collectively bargain with the State.
- University of Wisconsin Hospitals and Clinics (UWHC) Board and Authority: The law removes language mandating collective bargaining for UWHC employees. State positions formerly employed by the UWHC Board have been eliminated and the incumbents transferred to the UWHC Authority.
- University of Wisconsin faculty and academic staff: The laws repeals the authority of UW faculty and academic staff to collectively bargain.
- Debt restructuring: The law authorizes the restructuring of principal payments in fiscal year 2010-11 on the state's general obligation bonds. These principal repayments are paid in future years. Since the state must make debt service payments by March 15, the law had to be enacted by February 25 to allow time to sell the refinancing bonds. This provision was projected to reduce debt service costs by $165 million in fiscal year 2010-11. This savings were to help address one‑time costs to comply with the Injured Patients and Families Compensation Fund state Supreme Court decision and make payments under the Minnesota‑Wisconsin tax reciprocity program.
- Medicaid deficit: Medicaid costs were expected to exceed current GPR appropriations by $153 million. The law increased the Medicaid GPR appropriation to address this shortfall.
- Authorize DHS to restructure program notwithstanding current law: To reduce the growth in Medicaid costs, the law authorizes the Department of Health Services to make program changes notwithstanding limits in state law related to specific program provisions. The department was expected to develop new approaches on program benefits, eligibility determination and provider cost-effectiveness. The changes require passive approval of the Joint Committee on Finance before implementation.
- Technical correction: Act 28 included language that required unused GPR expenditure authority in the Medicaid GPR appropriation at the end of the biennium to be carried over to the subsequent biennium. The law repeals this provision to ensure unspent funds in Medicaid lapse to the general fund balance.
- Aging and Disability Resource Centers (ADRC): The law transfers an estimated $3 million in savings in this appropriation to Medicaid. ADRC's are the intake and assessment element of the state's Family Care program.
- Corrections: The law provides $22 million GPR to address shortfalls in the Department of Corrections adult institutions appropriation. These shortfalls are due to health care costs, overtime, and reductions in salary and fringe benefit budgets under Act 28.
- Temporary Assistance to Needy Families (TANF) Funding for Earned Income Tax Credit (EITC): The law allocates $37 million of excess TANF revenues to increase TANF funding for the EITC from $6.6 million to $43.6 million in fiscal year 2010-11. By increasing TANF funding, GPR funding for the EITC is reduced by a commensurate amount.
- Income Augmentation Revenues: Allows the Department of Children and Families and Department of Health Services to use $6.5 million of already identified income augmentation revenues to meet fiscal year 2010-11 lapse requirements.
- Act 28 Required Lapses by DOA Secretary: Under Act 28, the Department of Administration Secretary must lapse or transfer a total of $680 million in 2009-11 from appropriations made to executive branch agencies to the general fund. The law reduces this amount by $79 million to ensure the lapses can be met in the next five months as this was ineffectively addressed by the previous administration.
- Lapse of Funding from Joint Committee on Finance (JCF) Appropriation: The JCF appropriation included $4.5 million related to estimated fiscal year 2010-11 implementation costs of 2009 Wisconsin Act 100 (operating while intoxicated enforcement changes). This funding was not anticipated to be needed in fiscal year 2010-11, and the law lapses these amounts to the general fund balance.
- Sale of State Heating Plants: The law authorizes the Department of Administration to sell state heating plants. The proceeds from any sale, net of remaining debt service, is deposited in the budget stabilization fund.
- Shift Key Cabinet Agency Positions to Unclassified Status: The law creates unclassified positions for chief legal counsel, public information officer and legislative liaison activities in cabinet agencies. An equivalent number of classified positions were deleted to offset the new unclassified positions. These activities are critical to each cabinet agency's overall mission and should have direct accountability to the agency head.
- University of Wisconsin–Madison flagship status: The law separates the flagship University of Wisconsin–Madison campus from the rest of the University of Wisconsin System.

== Legislative history ==
On February 14, 2011, Republican Governor Scott Walker introduced the legislation to the state legislature. Initially, legislative Democrats and union leaders offered to accept the increased cost of benefits but not the limited bargaining rights, which Walker subsequently rejected. A few days later, to prevent passage of the bill, all fourteen Democratic members of the Wisconsin State Senate fled Wisconsin and traveled to Illinois to delay a vote on the bill. With only 19 Republican members, the Senate would not have the 20 Senators required for a quorum to vote on the bill, since it was a fiscal bill.

On February 20, all 14 Senate Democrats announced they would indefinitely remain in Illinois. Walker and the State Senate's Republicans tried to get the absentee Democrats to return. In late February, the Governor threatened to lay off state workers as the deadline to restructure the state's debt approached, but the deadline passed without incident. State Senate Majority Leader, Scott Fitzgerald, stripped Democratic staffers of their access to the copy machines if their representatives were absent without leave for two days or more, forcing staffers for the 14 legislators on the run to pay out of pocket for printing and photocopying. Senators could not receive their salary via direct deposit if they are absent for two days or more, which would have forced them to collect their pay checks in person, which none could do until they all returned from Illinois after the legislation was signed.

In early March, Senate Republicans voted to fine absent members $100 per day of absence. Wisconsin Senate Republicans ordered the arrest of those senators who had fled the state for "contempt and disorderly behavior", authorizing the Senate Sergeant-at-Arms to seek help from law enforcement officers and to use force to return the senators to the Capitol. However, Wisconsin State Patrol officers could not cross state lines into Illinois.

Assembly Republicans began procedures to move the bill to a vote on February 22. Hundreds of constituents had signed up to give testimony while Democrats submitted dozens of amendments and conducted speeches, all which delayed the vote. On February 25, following sixty hours of debate, the final amendments had been defeated, and the Republican leadership of the Wisconsin State Assembly cut off debate as well as the public hearing and moved to pass the budget repair bill. The vote was 51 in favor and 17 opposed, with 28 not voting.

In March, Walker offered a compromise to keep certain collective bargaining rights in place for state workers. Workers would be able to continue bargaining over their salaries with no limit. Collective bargaining would also stay in place for mandatory overtime, performance bonuses, hazardous duty pay and classroom size for teachers. The Democratic Senators rejected the proposals as an inadequate compromise. The day after Democrats rejected Walker's compromise, Republicans held a joint Assembly-Senate committee meeting to discuss quorum requirements. The Senate requires a quorum to take up any measures that spend money; however, by removing parts of the bill related to money, they had discovered a way to bypass the chamber's missing Democrats. After the meeting, the Senate passed the legislation 18-1. The next day, the Wisconsin Assembly passed the collective bargaining bill with a vote of 53–42.

On March 11, Governor Walker signed the bill and put out a statement rescinding layoff notices for 1,500 public workers. The next day, the fourteen absentee Democratic senators returned.

== Legal challenges ==
In response, Dane County Executive Kathleen Falk sued the state on grounds that the bill was unconstitutionally passed because the budget repair bill contained fiscal provisions. Judge Amy Smith recused herself from hearing the case, which was instead heard by Judge Maryann Sumi. On March 16, Dane County District Attorney Ismael Ozanne filed a second suit against the state on similar grounds.

On March 18, 2011, Judge Sumi issued a stay on the bill because it had been passed without the required 24 hours notice to inform the public of the meeting. Attorney General J. B. Van Hollen then announced he was appealing the ruling. Despite this, on March 25, the Legislative Reference Bureau bypassed the Secretary of State's office and published the collective bargaining law, and Republicans declared it law, which they would enforce.

On March 29, Judge Sumi reiterated her judgment that the bill had not become law regardless of the entity that published it, and public officials who attempted to enforce it risked legal sanctions. On June 14, the Wisconsin Supreme Court overruled Sumi, declaring that the law was passed legally and that Sumi had overstepped her jurisdiction.

On March 30, 2012, a federal court struck down parts of the collective bargaining legislation, ruling that the state cannot prevent public employee unions from automatically collecting dues and cannot require that they recertify annually. However, Wisconsin Attorney General Van Hollen sued, and a federal court of appeals overturned the ruling on January 18, 2013.

On September 14, 2012, Dane County Circuit Judge Juan Colas ruled that a section of the budget repair bill was unconstitutional, leaving the law in force for state workers but not for city, county and school workers. Governor Walker promised to appeal the decision. Under the repair bill, state and local governments could not bargaining with their workers over anything besides a cost-of-living salary adjustment, including health benefits, pensions, workplace safety and other work rules. The ruling restored local unions' ability to reach fair share deals that require all workers within a given bargaining unit to pay union dues, even if they choose not to join.

The ruling appeared to strike down for local workers a requirement that they pay half of the contribution to their pensions and for workers within the state of Wisconsin health insurance system, pay at least 12% of their premiums. Those cost savings had been crucial for local governments and school districts to deal with the more than $1 billion in cuts in state aid over two years that Walker and GOP lawmakers passed last year to close a state budget hole. The Supreme Court of the State of Wisconsin heard Governor Walker's appeal (# 2012AP002067) of Judge Colas' ruling in Madison Teachers, Inc. v. Scott Walker on November 11, 2013. It upheld Act 10 on July 31, 2014.

=== Wisconsin Supreme Court ruling (2014) ===
On August 1, 2014, it was reported in The New York Post ("Wis. gov wins union battle") that the "Wisconsin Supreme Court on Thursday [July 31, 2014] upheld the 2011 law that effectively ended collective bargaining for most [Wisconsin] public workers ... [the] 5-2 ruling upholds Walker's signature policy achievement in its entirety and is a major victory for the potential 2016 GOP presidential candidate, who is seeking re-election this year. The ruling also marks the end of the three-year legal fight over the law, which prohibits public-employee unions from collectively bargaining for anything beyond wage increases based on inflation. A federal appeals court twice upheld the law as constitutional. 'No matter the limitations or 'burdens' a legislative enactment places on the collective-bargaining process, collective bargaining remains a creation of legislative grace and not constitutional obligation", Justice Michael Gableman wrote.'"

=== Renewed legal challenges (2024) ===
In 2023, the Wisconsin Supreme Court flipped to liberal control with the election of Janet Protasiewicz. This led to new interest in challenging the constitutionality of the decade-old legislation that had crippled public employee unions in the state. In November 2023, seven unions which represented public employees in Wisconsin initiated new litigation in Dane County Circuit Court, arguing that Act 10 violated state equal protection guarantees because it exempted an arbitrary class of "public safety" unions from the law. The case was assigned to circuit judge Jacob B. Frost, an appointee of governor Tony Evers. Frost ruled on December 2, 2024, that the separate classification did represent an equal protection violation, striking that definition from the law, then striking much of the rest of the law which dealt with restrictions on collective bargaining. Frost explained his ruling by writing, "I cannot solve Act 10's constitutional problems by striking the definition of 'public safety employee,' leaving the term undefined and leaving the remainder of the law in place."

Republican Assembly speaker Robin Vos immediately announced that he would appeal the decision.

== District and municipal savings ==
The results have been mixed for school districts that had long-term labor contracts in place, how much they already were charging employees for health insurance, their enrollment trends, their fiscal situation, and local political factors. Act 10 allowed districts to re-open union contracts to take advantage of the tools available in the act if the union membership chose to do so up to three months after the bill was signed into law.

== Reductions in state aid ==
The budget repair law reduced state aid to K-12 school districts by about $900 million over the next two years. 410 of Wisconsin's 424 districts was projected to receive about 10 percent less aid than the previous year. The biggest losses in dollar amounts was predicted to occur in the Milwaukee, Racine and Green Bay districts; Milwaukee was projected to lose $54.6 million, Racine $13.1 million, and Green Bay $8.8 million. A complex formula based on property values, student enrollment and other factors computes state aid to schools. Property-poor districts get more aid than property-rich districts because they have lower property wealth (the total value of property per student). A provision in the budget repair law restricts the options of what districts can collect in property taxes and other revenue by requiring a referendum to force them to go to the citizens of the district before replacing their losses in state aid. In Milwaukee, district officials announced they have eliminated 514 vacant positions and laid off almost 520 employees, including 354 teachers, mostly from elementary schools, which will result in larger class sizes. The Milwaukee School Board asked its teachers' union for a side agreement requiring teachers to contribute 5.8% of their pay toward pensions, as the union contract extended through 2013. This concession would have saved about $20 million and 200 jobs, but the union refused it. The Racine district has saved about $18 million from a wage freeze and larger employee contributions to pensions and health care, but the loss of state aid required the elimination of 125 positions (although a larger than usual number of retirements and resignations, as well as soon-to-be eliminated vacant positions meant the district actually laid off 60) and the closing of all but one swimming pool for the summer.

Green Bay district froze wages and required greater employee contributions to pensions and health care, but the district stopped filling vacancies and may have to combine elementary grades into single classrooms. Almost 70% of state school districts will be eligible for special adjustment aid, due to the decrease in the state's share of support. The special adjustment aid intends to provide school districts with 90% of the state general aid from the previous year.

== Effect on unions ==
Public employee union membership dropped significantly after the law passed, with AFSCME reporting a drop from 62,818 in 2011 to 28,745 in February 2012. In some cases, the union removed union members after they declined to have the union collect dues.

Since teachers' unions could no longer automatically deduct dues from teachers' paychecks, unions resort to methods, including using a combination of meetings, emails, phone calls and home visits to have teachers signed up for dues collection. Some school districts primarily sign members up for electronic funds transfers so they can deduct money monthly. An IRS filing available shows that The Wisconsin Education Association Council collected about $23.5 million in membership dues in fiscal year 2009 from its approximately 98,000 members.

Most of the membership dues pay salaries and benefits. The organization employed 151 people and paid them $14,382,812 with an average compensation total of $95,250 per employee. This figure includes not only professional staff, but also lost wages paid to union bargaining team members, officers, and delegates to conventions. The Wisconsin Education Association Council (WEAC), announced that it would lay off about 40% of its workforce. The layoffs and budget cuts were based on a projected loss of revenue as a result of the budget repair legislation.

The UW-Madison teaching assistant union, which was at the forefront of the protests against the new budget repair law, voted not to recertify their union in August 2011 in protest over the law's recertification procedures. Union leaders for state and local government workers said they also are leaning toward not recertifying. The Wisconsin Education Association Council (WEAC), the state's largest teachers union, is the only state union to date that has indicated it plans to seek official union status with the state. The Wisconsin Education Association Council (WEAC) announced it would allow local union affiliates to possibly drop certification and that the agency would accept whatever the local unions chose.

These issues will be re-determined after the State's appeal of Judge Colas's decision that part of the repair bill is unconstitutional (see above) has been ruled on by the Supreme Court of the State of Wisconsin, which calendared those appeal hearings for November 11, 2013.

== "Double dipping" controversy ==
According to a report by radio talk show host Mark Belling, Tom Maki, the Vice Chancellor for Business and Finance at University of Wisconsin-Green Bay, retired in March 2011 due to the reforms proposed in the budget repair legislation. In April 2011, the Vice Chancellor was re-hired without a search and screen process. He returned to his previous salary of $131,000. This permits him to collect both his state pension payments and his salary. State Representative Stephen Nass (R-Whitewater), Chairman of the Assembly Colleges and Universities Committee, expressed outrage at the report that the Vice Chancellor is being allowed to "double dip" by retiring and then being re-hired for his position.

Nass announced he would cancel a public hearing on a bill supported by UW-Green Bay that would allow it and two other campuses to adopt a differential tuition system despite the current tuition cap. He has said he wants to determine if any state laws and UW System hiring rules were violated in this arrangement between the Vice Chancellor and Chancellor Thomas Harden as well as a request that the UW System conduct a review of all campuses to determine how many of these arrangements have been authorized since February. State law prohibits agencies from making an arrangement to rehire someone who is planning to retire before that person leaves.

About 1,100 retirees were rehired in 2011. Maki refused to comment and resigned in disgrace from the vice chancellorship in December 2011. In October 2011, it was discovered that another UW-Green Bay administrator (Timothy Sewall) retired in March and returned to his $110,000-a-year position a month later, collecting both his salary and about $44,000 in annual retirement payments.

== Other opinions and reactions ==
One proposal sought to diminish legislative oversight of the implementation of, and eligibility requirements for, state Medicaid programs. A clause that would have allowed the state to sell up to 37 heating and cooling plants across the state without requiring competitive bids generated controversy. After certain journalists expressed concerns that this provision could be part of a larger plan to sell state assets at bargain prices to business interests controlled by Charles and David Koch, who supported Walker's bid for governor, Koch Industries issued a statement denying any interest in purchasing any state owned power plants in Wisconsin. Generating controversy also was a proposal, backed by University of Wisconsin Chancellor Carolyn Martin and promoted as the "New Badger Partnership", to separate the flagship University of Wisconsin–Madison campus from the rest of the University of Wisconsin System.

== See also ==
- 2011 Wisconsin protests
- Wisconsin Supreme Court election, 2011
- Wisconsin Senate recall elections, 2011
- Wisconsin Senate recall elections, 2012
- Wisconsin gubernatorial recall election, 2012
