= 2011 Dane County Executive special election =

- April 5, 2011
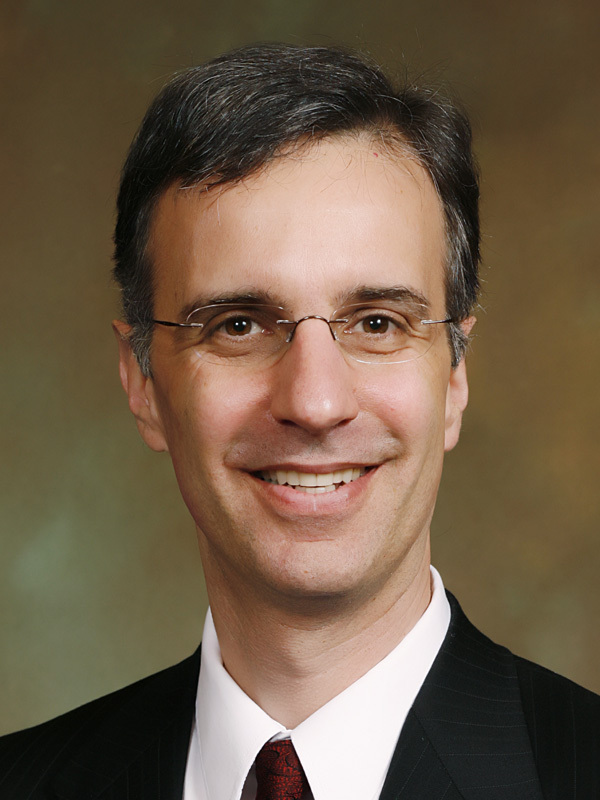

Nominee	Joe Parisi	Eileen Bruskewitz
Party	Nonpartisan	Nonpartisan
Popular vote	120,283	51,154
Percentage	70.09%	29.81%
County Executive before election
Kathleen Falk
Nonpartisan
Elected County Executive
Joe Parisi
Nonpartisan

The 2011 Dane County Executive special election took place on April 5, 2011, following a primary election on February 15, 2011. Incumbent County Executive Kathleen Falk, who was first elected in 1997, announced that she would retire from office.

In the primary election, State Representative Joe Parisi placed first, winning 26 percent of the vote. County Supervisor Eileen Bruskewitz placed second, winning 22 percent of the vote, and advancing to the general election against Parisi. At the general election, Parisi won in a landslide, receiving 70 percent of the vote to Bruskewitz's 30 percent.

== Primary election ==
=== Candidates ===
- Joe Parisi, State Representative
- Eileen Bruskewitz, Dane County Supervisor
- Scott McDonell, Dane County Supervisor
- Joe Wineke, former Chair of the Democratic Party of Wisconsin, former State Senator
- Zach Brandon, former Assistant State Secretary of Commerce
- Spencer Zimmerman, independent contractor

=== Results ===
Primary election results
Party	Candidate	Votes	%
Nonpartisan	Joe Parisi	18,066	26.21%
Nonpartisan	Eileen Bruskewitz	15,430	22.38%
Nonpartisan	Scott McDonell	14,266	20.69%
Nonpartisan	Joe Wineke	12,763	18.51%
Nonpartisan	Zach Brandon	7,717	11.19%
Nonpartisan	Spencer Zimmerman	619	0.90%
Write-in		77	0.11%
Total votes		68,938	100.00%

== General election ==
=== Results ===
2011 Dane County Executive special election
Party	Candidate	Votes	%
Nonpartisan	Joe Parisi	120,283	70.09%
Nonpartisan	Eileen Bruskewitz	51,154	29.81%
Write-in		177	0.10%
Total votes		171,614	100.00%
