= 2001 Dane County Executive election =

- April 6, 2001
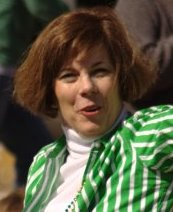

Nominee	Kathleen Falk	David Wiganowsky
Party	Nonpartisan	Nonpartisan
Popular vote	52,995	23,978
Percentage	70.03%	20.91%
County Executive before election
Kathleen Falk
Nonpartisan
Elected County Executive
Kathleen Falk
Nonpartisan

The 2001 Dane County Executive election took place on April 6, 2001. Incumbent County Executive Kathleen Falk ran for re-election to a second term. She was challenged by County Supervisor David Wiganowsky, one of her opponents in the 1997 election. During the campaign, Falk outraised and outspent Wiganowsky by a significant margin. Despite the closeness of her first election in 1997, Falk defeated Wiganowsky in a landslide, winning 70 percent of the vote to Wiganowsky's 30 percent.

== General election ==
=== Candidates ===
- Kathleen Falk, incumbent County Executive
- David Wiganowsky, County Supervisor

=== Results ===
2001 Dane County Executive election
Party	Candidate	Votes	%
Nonpartisan	Kathleen Falk (inc.)	52,995	70.03%
Nonpartisan	David Wiganowsky	22,632	29.91%
Write-in		50	0.07%
Total votes		75,677	100.00%
