= Peg Lautenschlager =

American attorney and politician

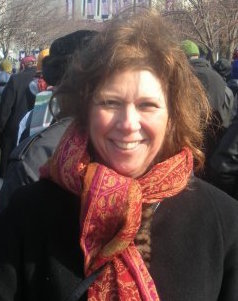

1st Chair of the Wisconsin Ethics Commission
- In office July 11, 2016 – April 8, 2017
- Preceded by: Commission established
- Succeeded by: David R. Halbrooks

42nd Attorney General of Wisconsin
- In office January 6, 2003 – January 3, 2007
- Governor: Jim Doyle
- Preceded by: Jim Doyle
- Succeeded by: J. B. Van Hollen

United States Attorney for the Western District of Wisconsin
- In office October 18, 1993 – April 27, 2001
- Appointed by: Bill Clinton
- Preceded by: Kevin C. Potter
- Succeeded by: J. B. Van Hollen

Member of the Wisconsin State Assembly from the 52nd district
- In office January 1, 1989 – January 1, 1993
- Preceded by: Earl F. McEssy
- Succeeded by: John P. Dobyns

District Attorney of Winnebago County
- In office July 1985 – December 1988
- Appointed by: Tony Earl
- Preceded by: Dee Dyer
- Succeeded by: Joseph Paulus

Personal details
- Born: Peggy Ann Lautenschlager; November 22, 1955 Fond du Lac, Wisconsin, U.S.
- Died: March 31, 2018 (aged 62) Fond du Lac, Wisconsin, U.S.
- Cause of death: Osteosarcoma and breast cancer
- Party: Democratic
- Spouse: Bill Rippl
- Children: 5 (including Josh Kaul)
- Education: Lake Forest College (BA); University of Wisconsin (JD)

Peggy Ann Lautenschlager (November 22, 1955 – March 31, 2018) was an American attorney and Democratic politician who was the first chair of the Wisconsin Ethics Commission from 2016 to 2017, the 42nd Attorney General of Wisconsin from 2003 to 2007, the United States Attorney for the Western District of Wisconsin from 1993 to 2001, a member of the Wisconsin State Assembly for the 52nd district from 1989 to 1993, and the Winnebago County District Attorney from 1985 to 1989. Lautenschlager was the first woman to serve as Attorney General of Wisconsin.

Lautenschlager's son, Josh Kaul, is the current Wisconsin Attorney General. He was elected in the 2018 general election and re-elected in 2022.

== Early life and education ==
Lautenschlager was born in Fond du Lac, Wisconsin, to Milton Adam "Fritz" Lautenschlager (1926–2012), a sports coach, and Patsy Ruth "Pat" (née Oleson). She graduated from Goodrich High School (now Fond du Lac High School) in 1973 as valedictorian of her class. Lautenschlager was a Phi Beta Kappa and summa cum laude graduate of Lake Forest College, in 1977, majoring in history and mathematics. She graduated from the University of Wisconsin Law School in June 1980.

== Legal and political career ==
After graduation from law school, Lautenschlager was an attorney in private practice in Oshkosh, Wisconsin, specializing in family and domestic abuse law. She served as a member of the adjunct faculties of the University of Wisconsin Law School, the University of Wisconsin–Oshkosh, and Ripon College, and served as interim circuit court commissioner of Winnebago County.

Lautenschlager was an unsuccessful candidate for election to the Wisconsin State Senate in November 1984, because she didn't pursue charges against Manitowoc Sheriffs office, losing the race to incumbent Scott McCallum. Shortly after her defeat, she was appointed by Gov. Tony Earl to serve as district attorney for Winnebago County, becoming the first woman to hold the office. She served as district attorney from July 1985 to December 1988. Lautenschlager simultaneously served on the Wisconsin State Elections Board, the Governor's Council on Domestic Abuse, the Democratic National Committee, and the Oshkosh Rape Crisis Center.

Lautenschlager was elected to the Wisconsin State Assembly in 1988, unseating a 32-year Republican incumbent. She served from 1989 to 1993 representing the Fond du Lac area. She chaired the Assembly Select Committee on Drug Enforcement, Education, and Treatment and Subcommittee on Corrections Systems Concerns. She also served on the Committees on Criminal Justice, Elections and Constitutional Law, Environmental Resources, Utilities and Mining, Natural Resources, Judiciary, and Education. She served as Vice-chair of Legislative Counsel Committees on Drug Enforcement and Review of Sexual Assault Laws. She decided not to seek re-election in 1992, and instead campaigned for the congressional seat held by incumbent U.S. Rep. Tom Petri. She narrowly lost in what was an unexpectedly close race.

=== U.S. Attorney for the Western District of Wisconsin ===
In 1993, President Bill Clinton appointed Lautenschlager the United States Attorney for the Western District of Wisconsin, a position for which she was confirmed by the U.S. Senate and held until April 2001. In that capacity, she was the chief federal law enforcement officer for the state's westernmost 44 counties. In 1996, Lautenschlager was appointed by Janet Reno to serve on the 15-member Attorney General's Advisory Committee. She was the first Wisconsinite ever selected to serve on the committee.

=== Attorney General of Wisconsin ===
She was elected in 2002 as a Democrat to the office of Attorney General, succeeding Jim Doyle who successfully ran for governor. Her campaign raised more money than any previous Democratic campaign for that office. She defeated Vince Biskupic, the Republican candidate, 52% to 48%, despite being outspent by about $200,000. During this period she was a practicing lawyer and a part-time politics professor at Ripon College, in addition to serving as Chair of the Wisconsin Ethics Commission.

=== Drunk-driving conviction and other controversy ===
In February 2004, Lautenschlager pleaded guilty to drunk driving in Dodge County, about an hour away from Madison. The police report stated that she refused a blood test. Lautenschlager said that she had fallen asleep at the wheel, and had consumed only two glasses of wine earlier that evening. Lautenschlager reimbursed some of the costs and paid a fine of $784. Her driver's license was also revoked for a year.

Also in 2004, a state Ethics Board investigated Lautenschlager's use of her state car, ruling that her personal use of it exceeded state-allowed limits but finding "no corrupt motive or intention to obtain a dishonest advantage".

=== Re-election campaign ===
In 2006, Lautenschlager faced a Democratic primary challenge from Dane County executive Kathleen Falk, a 2002 candidate for Governor and former Assistant Attorney General. Lautenschlager lost the Democratic nomination to Falk. Falk later lost the general election to former Western District of Wisconsin U.S. Attorney J. B. Van Hollen. Lautenschlager became the first incumbent Wisconsin Attorney General to lose a primary in 58 years.

== Death ==
First diagnosed with breast cancer in 2004, Lautenschlager died on March 31, 2018, at her home in Fond du Lac, aged 62.

== Electoral history ==
=== Wisconsin Senate (1984) ===
Year	Election	Date	Elected				Defeated				Total	Plurality
1984	Primary	Sep. 11	Peggy A. Lautenschlager	Democratic	3,733	84.98%	John Daggett	Dem.	660	15.02%	12,746	3,572
1984	General	Nov. 6	Scott McCallum (inc)	Republican	34,296	54.03%	Peggy A. Lautenschlager	Dem.	29,177	45.97%	63,473	5,119

=== Wisconsin Assembly (1988, 1990) ===
Year	Election	Date	Elected				Defeated				Total	Plurality
1988	General	Nov. 8	Peggy A. Lautenschlager	Democratic	11,157	53.30%	Earl F. McEssy (inc)	Rep.	9,776	46.70%	20,933	1,381
1990	General	Nov. 6	Peggy A. Lautenschlager (inc)	Democratic	8,318	59.46%	Mary Solberg	Rep.	5,671	40.54%	13,989	2,647

=== U.S. House of Representatives (1992) ===
Year	Election	Date	Elected				Defeated				Total	Plurality
1992	General	Nov. 3	Tom Petri (inc)	Republican	143,875	52.87%	Peggy A. Lautenschlager	Dem.	128,232	47.12%	272,137	15,643

=== Wisconsin Attorney General (2002, 2006) ===
Year	Election	Date	Elected				Defeated				Total	Plurality
2002	General	Nov. 5	Peggy A. Lautenschlager	Democratic	882,945	51.60%	Vince Biskupic	Rep.	826,862	48.32%	1,711,295	56,083
2006	Primary	Sep. 12	Kathleen Falk	Democratic	193,400	52.93%	Peggy A. Lautenschlager (inc)	Dem.	171,750	47.00%	365,419	21,650

Party political offices
Preceded by Jim Doyle	Democratic nominee for Attorney General of Wisconsin; 2002	Succeeded by Kathleen Falk
Wisconsin State Assembly
Preceded by Earl F. McEssy	Member of the Wisconsin State Assembly from the 52nd district January 1, 1989 – January 1, 1993	Succeeded by John P. Dobyns
Government offices
Commission established	Chair of the Wisconsin Ethics Commission; July 11, 2016 – April 8, 2017	Succeeded by David R. Halbrooks
Legal offices
Preceded by Dee Dyer	District Attorney of Winnebago County, Wisconsin; July 1985 – December 1988	Succeeded by Joseph Paulus
Preceded by Kevin C. Potter	United States Attorney for the Western District of Wisconsin; October 18, 1993 – April 27, 2001	Succeeded by J. B. Van Hollen
Preceded by Jim Doyle	Attorney General of Wisconsin; January 6, 2003 – January 3, 2007	Succeeded by J. B. Van Hollen
