= John P. Dobyns =

American politician (1944–2020)

Member of the Wisconsin State Assembly from the 52nd district
- In office January 4, 1993 – January 4, 1999
- Preceded by: Peg Lautenschlager
- Succeeded by: John Townsend

Personal details
- Born: March 8, 1944 Fond du Lac, Wisconsin
- Died: August 28, 2020 (aged 76) Oshkosh, Wisconsin
- Party: Republican

John P. Dobyns (March 8, 1944 – August 28, 2020) was an American politician who served in the Wisconsin State Assembly from 1993 to 1999.

== Biography ==
Dobyns was born on March 8, 1944, in Fond du Lac, Wisconsin. He graduated from St. Mary's Springs High School and the University of Wisconsin-Oshkosh. From 1964 to 1969 and again from 1974 to 1995, Dobyns was a member of the United States Army Reserve. During that time, he graduated from the United States Army Command and General Staff College and retired with the rank of lieutenant colonel. He was also a member of the Fond du Lac County, Wisconsin Sheriff's Department. Dobyns was married with two children and was a member of the Knights of Columbus, Catholic War Veterans, the Benevolent and Protective Order of Elks and the Fraternal Order of Eagles.

He died of liver disease on August 28, 2020, in Oshkosh, Wisconsin at age 76.

== Political career ==
Dobyns was first elected to the Assembly in 1992. He was a Republican.
