= Scott McDonell =

American politician (born 1969)

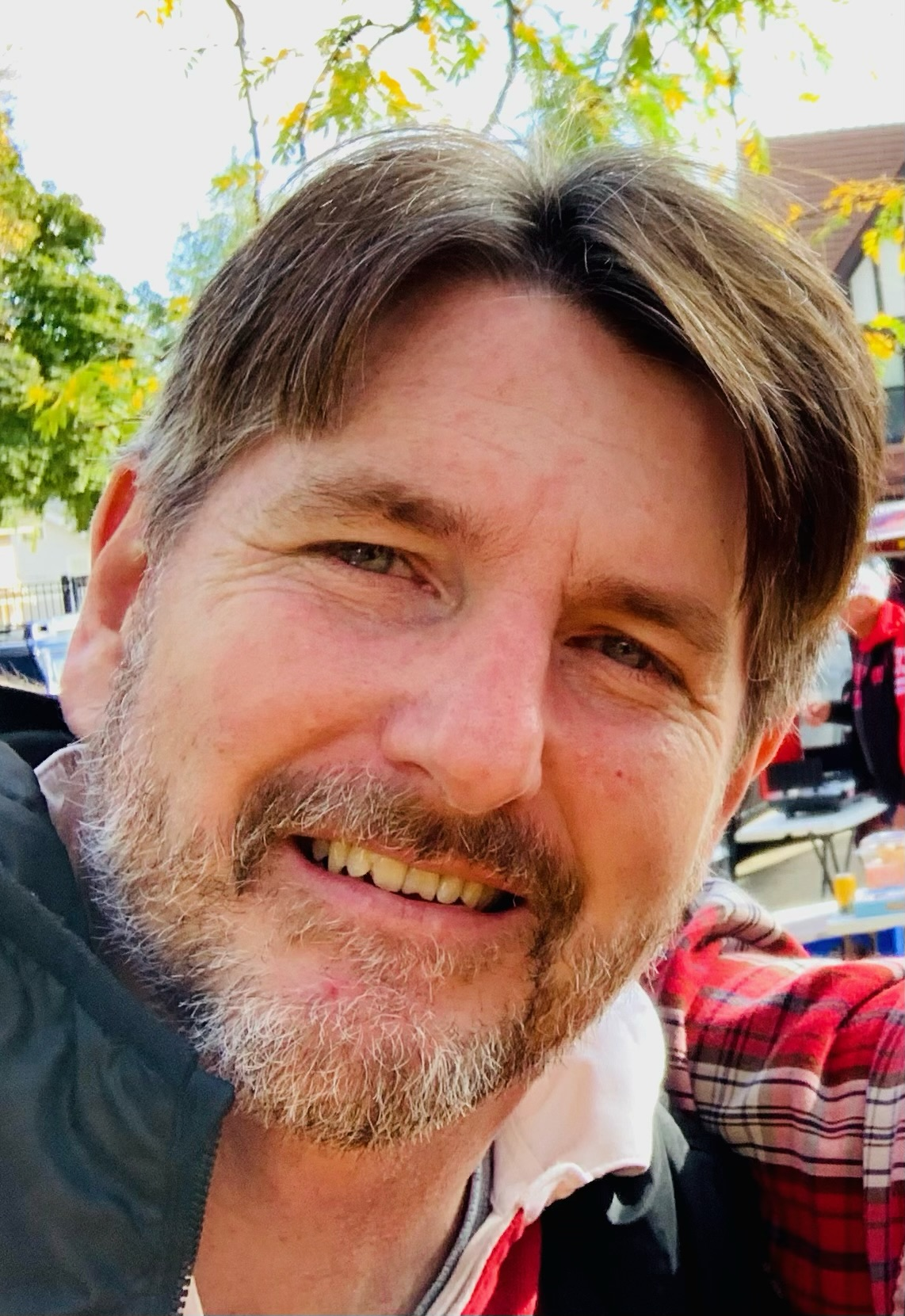
- McDonell in 2023

County Clerk of Dane County
- Incumbent
- Assumed office January 2013
- Preceded by: Bob Ohlsen

Personal details
- Born: April 29, 1969 (age 57) Washington, D.C.
- Party: Democratic Party
- Children: 2
- Education: University of Wisconsin–Madison

Scott Andrew McDonell (born April 29, 1969) is an American politician from Madison, Wisconsin. A Democrat, McDonell currently serves as the County Clerk in Dane County, Wisconsin having been elected to the position on November 6, 2012, and reelected in 2016 and 2020. Before his service as Clerk, McDonell served on the Dane County Board of Supervisors from 1996 to 2013, including eight years as chair.

As Clerk, McDonell is known for being the first clerk in the state to issue same-sex marriage licenses. He also organized other clerks to do so, after a federal court struck down the state's ban in Wolf v. Walker, but before the ruling was put on hold pending an appeal. McDonell has also been prominent in various disputes involving elections and the electoral process, overseeing recounts in the 2016 and 2020 presidential elections and navigating threats to election workers and administrators, and for his clashes with state Republicans over voting access during the COVID pandemic.

== Early life and education ==
McDonell was born in Washington, D.C. to father Robert McDonell and mother Ann Temple McDonell and grew up in Bethesda, Maryland where his mother was a professor at Montgomery College. He graduated from Walt Whitman High School, where he played varsity soccer and was active in the arts. He also played soccer at the University of Wisconsin–Madison, where he graduated with a BA in political science in 1995. Shortly after graduation, he successfully ran for a seat on the Dane County Board of Supervisors.

His early career also included employment in the state Department of Administration and public service on the boards of the Tenant Resource Center and the Madison Community Cooperative.

== Dane County Board 1996 - 2013 ==
McDonell was elected to the Dane County Board in April 1996, succeeding Mark Pocan. On the board, McDonell focused on issues including criminal justice reform, regional transportation solutions, mental health services and conducting an audit of Dane County's justice system. Highlights of his service include adoption of a Regional Transit Authority (which was later repealed by Republicans when they took over the Wisconsin Legislature) and creating the first county domestic partner registry. When Dane County Executive Kathleen Falk resigned before the end of her term, he became acting Dane County Executive. Although he was permitted to appoint himself for a longer term as acting County Executive, he declined, saying that it would be 'undemocratic' and giving him an unfair advantage in the upcoming election to succeed Falk. In a wide field of candidates, McDonell came in third in the 2011 primary, behind the eventual winner of the general election Democrat Joe Parisi and conservative candidate Eileen Bruskewitz.

== Dane County Clerk 2013 - present ==
Dane County Clerk Bob Ohlsen retired in February 2011, roughly two years before his term expired, and asked McDonell as County Board chair to appoint Karen Peters, the deputy clerk, as the interim County Clerk. Peters declined to run for a full term, and McDonell entered the race to serve as the next County Clerk. In August 2012 he won a 4-way primary for the Democratic nomination and was unopposed in the November general election and took office in January 2013. He defeated independent Karen McKim in 2016 for reelection, and was unopposed for reelection in 2020, receiving 275,281 votes.

As clerk he served on Dane County's Redistricting Commission.

When the county got new voting equipment in 2014, McDonell joined forces with YouTube series Chad Vader to create a voting information video for Dane County. He also co-wrote the scripts for videos with Vader on the topics of Voter ID and a 2020 pandemic video on absentee voting. The latter won a national award for best municipal public service announcement.

=== Same-sex marriage ===
A primary duty of the Dane County Clerk's Office, in addition to overseeing elections, is to issue marriage licenses. Long a supporter of same-sex unions, one of McDonell's first high-profile actions as clerk took place on Friday June 6, 2014, when a federal judge ruled that same-sex marriage was legal in Wisconsin. He had prepared for that possibility in advance, having staff, judges and court commissioners at the ready for a “marriage rush” that day and adding open office hours into the following weekend.

McDonell organized clerks around the state, and “act[ed] as a de facto spokesman for county clerks across the state and [saw] to it that as many marriages as possible took place during a one-week window of opportunity” after the initial ruling. Despite statements from Republican Attorney General J.B. Van Hollen that the state ban remained in force and even suggesting that clerks issuing licenses could be prosecuted, eventually 60 of the 72 counties issued marriage licenses to same-sex couples before the Federal court issued an injunction halting same-sex marriages pending appeal. The Seventh Circuit Court of Appeals denied the appeal in September 2014 and in October the US Supreme Court declined to take up the case, and on October 7, 2014, same-sex marriages resumed in Wisconsin.

=== Election challenges ===
After Republicans took control of state government in 2010, they implemented a number of changes to voting in Wisconsin, changing procedures for election officials and voters. McDonell helped organize communication among clerks on how to approach these new laws, which made Wisconsin voting requirements among the most restrictive in the nation. He also worked on helping voters get needed identification, including coordinating free rides to the Department of Motor Vehicles to obtain a voter ID.

Further challenges emerged in 2020. The COVID-19 pandemic – and the resulting shelter at home order – came just weeks before Wisconsin's presidential primary. This resulted in legal challenges and rapidly changing guidance from courts and elected officials, while requests for absentee ballots surged. The Wisconsin Republican Party sued McDonell over advice he gave on Facebook that voters could be considered “indefinitely confined” due to the pandemic and the Wisconsin Supreme Court ordered him to remove the post. Another pandemic challenge was a lack of available poll workers. In Dane County, 249 Wisconsin National Guard members filled in as poll workers, keeping lines much shorter than they were elsewhere in Wisconsin.

After President Donald Trump lost the 2020 election, his followers and many Republican officials challenged the election results. The Trump campaign filed lawsuits in State and Federal court, some of which named McDonell specifically in the lawsuits. In addition, in Dane County and Milwaukee County, Trump's campaign paid for a recount.

McDonell has received subpoenas as part of the United States Justice Department investigation into attempts to overturn the 2020 presidential election.

=== Initiatives ===
To address concerns about safety and to ensure election equipment could be maintained in a secure environment to prevent tampering, McDonell and the Dane County Board of Supervisors established an election security task force in early 2022. A review by the US Department of Homeland Security identified shortcomings in the security of the office, and later that summer the task force released its reporting, calling for a new secure facility to be constructed to provide better protection for election administrators and limited access to voting equipment while in storage. In the interim, McDonell has upgraded security of the existing offices, adding secure doors and bullet-proof glass. Dane County Executive Joe Parisi included the new facility in his 2023 budget, as the largest capital project in the budget, with the goal of opening in 2024. He has also administered training courses for election workers in de-escalating conflict at the polls.

n 2016 McDonell, along with researchers from the UW-Madison, MIT, and others engaged in a research project to measure how the time it takes to check IDs and other steps in the voting process effects the overall voting experience. In 2022, McDonell became a member of the Committee for Safe and Secure Elections, a group whose stated purpose is to protect voters and election workers from security threats. As Clerk, McDonell created a new 'Election Audit Central' website that posts (anonymized) scans of each ballot cast.

== Personal life ==
McDonell lives in downtown Madison with his wife Megin and two children. He is the Lecturing Knight of the Madison Elks Lodge 410.
