= J. B. Van Hollen =

American lawyer and politician (born 1966)

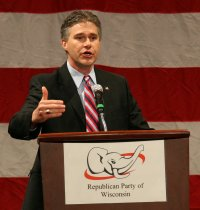

43rd Attorney General of Wisconsin
- In office January 3, 2007 – January 5, 2015
- Governor: Jim Doyle; Scott Walker
- Preceded by: Peg Lautenschlager
- Succeeded by: Brad Schimel

United States Attorney for the Western District of Wisconsin
- In office 2002–2005
- Appointed by: George W. Bush
- Preceded by: Peg Lautenschlager
- Succeeded by: Erik C. Peterson

Bayfield County District Attorney
- In office 1999–2002
- Appointed by: Tommy Thompson

Ashland County District Attorney
- In office 1993–1999
- Appointed by: Tommy Thompson
- Preceded by: Robert E. Eaton
- Succeeded by: Michael Gableman

Personal details
- Born: John Byron Van Hollen; February 19, 1966 (age 60) Chetek, Wisconsin, U.S.
- Party: Republican
- Spouse: Lynne Van Hollen;
- Relations: John C. Van Hollen (father)
- Children: Byron Van Hollen and Maddy Van Hollen
- Education: St. Olaf College (BA); University of Wisconsin (JD)
- Profession: Attorney

John Byron Van Hollen (born February 19, 1966) is an American lawyer and Republican politician from Wisconsin. He served as the 43rd attorney general of Wisconsin, from 2007 to 2015. Earlier, he was appointed United States Attorney for the Western District of Wisconsin from 2002 to 2005, and served as district attorney of Ashland County, Wisconsin, and Bayfield County, Wisconsin, in the 1990s.

His father is John C. Van Hollen, a realtor who served in the Wisconsin State Assembly in the 1960s.

== Background ==
The Van Hollen family lived near Chetek, Wisconsin, and later moved to Delta, Wisconsin. He graduated from St. Olaf College in 1988 with an undergraduate degree in political science and economics. He earned his J.D. degree two years later from the University of Wisconsin Law School.

In 1993, Governor Tommy Thompson appointed incumbent Ashland County District Attorney Robert E. Eaton a circuit court judge, and in turn appointed Van Hollen to succeed Eaton as the District Attorney in Ashland County. He was subsequently called to service again when Governor Thompson appointed him to serve as Bayfield County District Attorney. He was appointed as the U.S. Attorney for Wisconsin's Western District where he served in that role from 2002 to 2005.

Van Hollen won the Republican nomination for Attorney General in 2006 over then-Waukesha County District Attorney Paul Bucher. In the general election, he narrowly defeated Dane County Executive Kathleen Falk, who had previously bested Lautenschlager in the Democratic primary. Van Hollen was the only Republican in Wisconsin to win a statewide race in 2006. In 2010, he defeated his Democratic opponent by a comfortable margin.

== Attorney general ==
Upon taking office in 2007, Van Hollen took on a backlog of DNA evidence at the Wisconsin State Crime Laboratory. The backlog had grown to thousands of cases. He worked with the Wisconsin Legislature to secure additional resources to solve the backlog and created new efficiencies at the Crime Lab. In 2008, Van Hollen announced changes made by his administration have reduced the backlog by 43% since he took office. His goal was to eliminate the backlog by December 2010.

In April 2010, Van Hollen reached that goal and eliminated the backlog of DNA evidence at the Crime Lab. He secured funding from the federal government to investigate cold case crimes. One of the cold cases led to the arrest of Walter Ellis, a suspected serial killer in Milwaukee.

In September 2008, Van Hollen sued the Wisconsin Government Accountability Board, the state elections agency, to force it check voter registrations for accuracy. Van Hollen said that the motivation for the lawsuit was that potentially illegal votes could sway the election. On October 23, 2008, a Dane County circuit judge dismissed the lawsuit, ruling that Van Hollen did not have standing to bring the lawsuit, because only the United States Attorney General can enforce federal law. Van Hollen appealed the judge's ruling but later dropped it when the Government Accountability Board updated their voter check procedure.

On October 7, 2013, Van Hollen announced he would not seek reelection in 2014 for a third term as attorney general.

== Electoral history ==
Wisconsin Attorney General Election 2006
Party	Candidate	Votes	%	±%
Republican	J. B. Van Hollen	1,062,657	50.15	
Democratic	Kathleen Falk	1,053,586	49.74	
Republican gain from Democratic				

Wisconsin Attorney General Election 2010
Party	Candidate	Votes	%	±%
Republican	J. B. Van Hollen (incumbent)	1,220,128	57.8	
Democratic	Scott Hassett	889,902	42.2	
Republican hold				

Party political offices
Preceded by Vince Biskupic	Republican nominee for Attorney General of Wisconsin; 2006, 2010	Succeeded by Brad Schimel
Legal offices
Preceded by Peg Lautenschlager	Attorney General of Wisconsin; January 3, 2007 – January 5, 2015	Succeeded by Brad Schimel
