= Wisconsin Education Association Council =

Teachers' union

WEAC
- Wisconsin Education Association Council
- Founded: 1853
- Location: United States
- Key people: Ron Martin, President
- Affiliations: NEA
- Website: www.weac.org

The Wisconsin Education Association Council (WEAC) is an education public-sector trade union representing the public policy, labor and professional interests of its members. It is affiliated with the National Education Association. Its headquarters are located in Madison, Wisconsin.

== History ==
WEAC traces its history back to 1853, when a group of teachers and school administrators in Wisconsin formed the "Wisconsin Teachers Association". After passage of a collective bargaining law for public employees, it evolved into a pro-active teachers union and in 1972 changed its name to the Wisconsin Education Association Council. Later, WEAC expanded its membership to education support staff, as well as university, technical college, and state education and information professionals.

WEAC represents its members in areas such as collective bargaining, legislation, professional development and support and public relations. WEAC states that it advocates on behalf of the 865,000 children in Wisconsin public schools.

WEAC also created the WEA Trust in 1970 to "provide an independent alternative to commercial insurance companies" "offer[ing] group health insurance to Wisconsin public schools. Currently, the Trust provides public school teachers, state health plan members, and local units of government with group insurance." The WEA Trust is owned and financially tied to WEAC, often the two organizations have worked closely together in the past.

In 2012, 45 Wisconsin School districts sued WEA Trust for withholding district funds after collective bargaining contracts with WEAC concluded, and to reclaim funds from the Early Retirement Reinsurance Program. WEA Trust counter-sued against 14 School Districts, announcing they would drop litigation if the School Districts dropped their litigation.

In 2011, Act 10 was signed into law by Wisconsin Governor Scott Walker. This law limited collective bargaining for public employees, excluding state patrol troopers, firefighters, and inspectors, on all issues except for base pay. This change to Wisconsin law had a profound effect on WEAC and all other public-sector unions in the state. One of those effects was the loss of 29% of pre-Act 10 membership, since public employees of public schools were no longer forced to belong to a public sector union. Prior to Act 10, dues were collected by school districts involuntarily. After Act 10, WEAC was required to collect dues and resulted in WEAC reducing its staff by 40%.

== Membership ==
WEAC membership includes:

- Teachers, counselors and library media specialists in Wisconsin public K-12 schools.
- Education support professionals—secretaries, teacher aides, bus drivers, custodians, cooks—employed in public K-12 schools.
- Faculty and support staff in the Wisconsin Technical College System.
- Active retired members.
- University students who are studying to be educators.

== Lobbying activity ==
- WEAC was the top lobbyist in Wisconsin in 2009. (7,239 hours, $1,511,272)
- WEAC was the top lobbyist in Wisconsin in 2010. (10,462 hours, $2,143,588)
- WEAC was the 2nd-place lobbyist in 2011, (Behind the Wisconsin State AFL-CIO). (9,370 hours, $2,062,716)

== Legal affairs ==
WEAC attempts to interview candidates for political and judicial office, but at least one judicial candidate has refused an interview with the association, claiming, "it might give the impression of a hidden agenda."

=== Suits against Virtual School ===
WEAC had made several suits in the recent years against Wisconsin virtual schools. One such suit is when the association sued the Wisconsin Virtual Academy and Connections Academy, because WEAC felt that the two schools "were operating in violation of open enrollment, charter school and teacher licensing laws". Wisconsin Virtual Academy was first established in September 2003 with full approval of the DPI. When WEAC sued WIVA, the DPI was a defendant, but it sided with WEAC in the lawsuit.

=== Suit against State of Wisconsin for Constitutional 1st and 14th Amendment violations ===
Background

The Wisconsin Legislative Branch wrote a bill to limit collective bargaining laws that were established in Wisconsin in 1959, which was signed into law by the Governor. The bill was halted by the Dane County Circuit Judge Maryann Sumi. The Wisconsin Supreme Court unanimously found Judge Sumi to be in violation of Constitutional Separation of Powers. The Wisconsin Secretary of State Doug La Follette refused to publish the law immediately after the Wisconsin Supreme Court decision, enabling WEAC, along with other unions which represented public employees, to file a Complaint for Declaratory and Injunctive Relief against Wisconsin Governor Scott Walker and others in the administration on the basis that:

Basis of Lawsuit

- An employer that compensates employees of a public union with different specialties (in this case Public Safety employees), violates the 14th Amendment to the Constitution of the United States of America.
- The lack of a public union to involuntary take funds from public employees in the State of Wisconsin violates the 1st Amendment to the Constitution of the United States of America, because without those funds, the public unions claim, removes the ability for public unions to exercise free speech.
