= Richard J. Phelps =

American politician

Richard J. "Rick" Phelps is an American politician from Wisconsin. Phelps served as Dane County, Wisconsin County Executive for nine years.

== Background ==
Phelps received his bachelor's degree and law degrees from the University of Wisconsin–Madison.

== Dane County Executive ==
In 1988, Phelps ran in a special election for the office of Dane County, Wisconsin County Executive against Joe Wineke. Phelps defeated Wineke and then served as Dane County Executive 1988-1997 replacing Jonathan B. Barry who resigned. Phelps was the executive director of the Wisconsin Public Defenders at the time of his election serving from 1983 to 1988. After he left office, Phelps served as senior vice president of M&I Bank.

== Wisconsin Democratic Primary Congressional Election of 1998 ==
In 1998, Phelps lost a race for the Democratic Party nomination for WI-02, finishing second in a four-way primary to Tammy Baldwin, who went on to win the House seat being vacated by retiring Republican Representative Scott Klug.
