= 2002 Wisconsin gubernatorial election =

- November 5, 2002
- Turnout: 45.43%
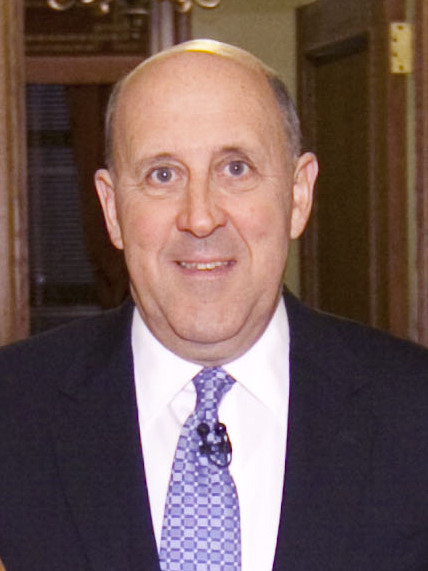

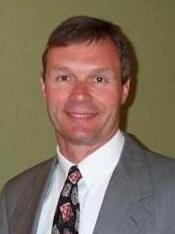

Nominee	Jim Doyle	Scott McCallum	Ed Thompson
Party	Democratic	Republican	Libertarian
Running mate	Barbara Lawton	Margaret Farrow	Marty Reynolds
Popular vote	800,515	734,779	185,455
Percentage	45.09%	41.39%	10.45%
- Doyle: 30–40% 40–50% 50–60% 60–70% 70–80% 80–90% >90% McCallum: 30–40% 40–50% 50–60% 60–70% 70–80% 80–90% >90% Thompson 30–40% 40–50% 50–60% 60–70% Tie
Governor before election
Scott McCallum
Republican
Elected Governor
Jim Doyle
Democratic

The 2002 Wisconsin gubernatorial election was held on November 5, 2002. Incumbent Republican Governor Scott McCallum, who had assumed office upon the resignation of Tommy Thompson, ran for his first full term in office. McCallum won his party's nomination by defeating two minor candidates, while State Attorney General Jim Doyle won the Democratic primary with a little more than a third of the vote in a highly competitive primary election. In the general election, the presence of Ed Thompson, former Governor Tommy Thompson's younger brother, the mayor of Tomah, and the Libertarian Party nominee, held both McCallum and Doyle to under fifty percent of the vote, enabling Doyle to win with 45% of the vote, defeating McCallum.

As of 2026, this is the last gubernatorial election in which the Democratic candidate carried Langlade, Manitowoc, Marquette, and Taylor counties, and the last in which Juneau County did not vote for the Republican candidate, instead voting for Thompson.

== Republican primary ==
McCallum, as the incumbent governor, did not face significant opposition in the primary. He was nominated with 86% of the primary vote.

=== Governor ===
==== Candidates ====
- William Lorge, former state representative
- Scott McCallum, incumbent governor of Wisconsin
- George Pobuda, teacher in Tomahawk, Wisconsin

==== Results ====
Republican gubernatorial primary results
Party	Candidate	Votes	%
Republican	Scott McCallum (incumbent)	198,525	86.23%
Republican	William Lorge	18,852	8.19%
Republican	George Pobuda	12,452	5.41%
Republican	Scattering	403	0.18%
Total votes		230,232	100.00%

=== Lieutenant governor ===
==== Candidates ====
- Margaret A. Farrow, incumbent lieutenant governor

==== Results ====
Republican lieutenant gubernatorial primary results
Party	Candidate	Votes	%
Republican	Margaret A. Farrow (incumbent)	189,871	99.83%
Republican	Scattering	321	0.17%
Total votes		190,192	100.00%

== Democratic primary ==
The primary election for the Democratic nomination was closely contested by three competitive candidates. The race was ultimately won by Jim Doyle with around 38% of the vote.

=== Governor ===
==== Candidates ====
===== Nominee =====
- Jim Doyle, incumbent attorney general of Wisconsin, former district attorney of Dane County.

===== Eliminated in primary =====
- Tom Barrett, U.S. representative from Wisconsin's 5th congressional district, former state senator and state representative
- Kathleen Falk, Dane county executive, former assistant Wisconsin attorney general, attorney

==== Polling ====
Poll source	Date(s) administered	Jim Doyle	Tom Barrett	Kathleen Falk
University of Wisconsin (Badger Poll)	Sept 2–5, 2002	39%	31%	30%
Milwaukee Journal Sentinel	Aug 26–28, 2002	31.5%	25.7%	25.1%

==== Results ====
Democratic primary results by county: Doyle—50–60% Doyle—40–50% Doyle—30–40% Falk—50–60% Barrett—50–60% Barrett—40–50% Barrett—30–40%

Democratic gubernatorial primary results
Party	Candidate	Votes	%
Democratic	Jim Doyle	212,066	38.30%
Democratic	Tom Barrett	190,605	34.43%
Democratic	Kathleen Falk	150,161	27.12%
Democratic	Scattering	802	0.14%
Total votes		553,634	100.00%

=== Lieutenant governor ===
==== Candidates ====
===== Nominee =====
- Barbara Lawton, nominee for lieutenant governor in 1998

===== Eliminated in primary =====
- Kevin Shibilski, member of Wisconsin Senate

==== Results ====
Results by county: Lawton—70–80% Lawton—60–70% Lawton—50–60% Shibilski—50–60% Shibilski—60–70% Shibilski—70–80% Shibilski—80–90%

Democratic lieutenant gubernatorial primary results
Party	Candidate	Votes	%
Democratic	Barbara Lawton	265,733	54.11%
Democratic	Kevin Shibilski	224,834	45.78%
Democratic	Scattering	525	0.11%
Total votes		491,092	100.00%

== Libertarian primary ==
=== Governor ===
==== Candidates ====
- Ed Thompson, former mayor of Tomah, Wisconsin (2000–2002), brother of former Governor Tommy Thompson

==== Results ====
Libertarian gubernatorial primary results
Party	Candidate	Votes	%
Libertarian	Ed Thompson	16,471	99.95%
Libertarian	Scattering	8	0.05%
Total votes		16,479	100.00%

=== Lieutenant governor ===
==== Candidates ====
- Marty Reynolds, member of Wisconsin State Assembly

Libertarian lieutenant gubernatorial primary results
Party	Candidate	Votes	%
Libertarian	Marty Reynolds	10,753	99.73%
Libertarian	Scattering	29	0.27%
Total votes		10,782	100.00%

== Green primary ==
=== Governor ===
==== Candidates ====
- Jim Young, City assessor for Sun Prairie, Wisconsin

==== Results ====
Green gubernatorial primary results
Party	Candidate	Votes	%
Green	Jim Young	2,337	99.66%
Green	Scattering	8	0.34%
Total votes		2,345	100.00%

=== Lieutenant governor ===
==== Candidates ====
- Jeff Peterson

==== Results ====
Green lieutenant gubernatorial primary results
Party	Candidate	Votes	%
Green	Jeff Peterson	2,206	99.46%
Green	Scattering	12	0.54%
Total votes		2,218	100.00%

== Independent nominations ==
=== Candidates ===
- Ty A. Bollerud, of Janesville, Wisconsin
- Alan D. Eisenberg, lawyer and real estate dealer
- Mike Mangan, perennial candidate from Oconomowoc, Wisconsin
- Aneb Jah Rasta, consultant and doctor of metaphysics

=== Results ===
Independent gubernatorial primary results
Party	Candidate	Votes	%
Independent	Alan D. Eisenberg	263	35.49%
Independent	Ty A. Bollerud	226	30.50%
Independent	Mike Mangan	150	20.24%
Independent	Aneb Jah Rasta	102	13.77%
Total votes		741	100.00%

== General election ==
=== Candidates ===
- Ty A. Bollerud
- Jim Doyle & Barbara Lawton, Democratic
- Alan D. Eisenberg
- Mike Mangan
- Scott McCallum & Margaret A. Farrow, Republican
- Aneb Jah Rasta
- Ed Thompson & Marty Reynolds, Libertarian
- Jim Young & Jeff Peterson, Green

=== Predictions ===
Source	Ranking	As of
The Cook Political Report	Tossup	October 31, 2002
Sabato's Crystal Ball	Lean D (flip)	November 4, 2002

=== Polling ===
Poll source	Date(s) administered	Jim Doyle (D)	Scott McCallum (R)	Ed Thompson (L)	Jim Young (G)	Others
University of Wisconsin (Badger Poll)	Oct 27–29, 2002	41%	34%	10%	2%	0%
University of Wisconsin (Badger Poll)	Oct 25–27, 2002	38%	36%	0%	0%	0%
Market Shares Corp	Oct 24–27, 2002	38%	36%	8%	4%	0%
St. Norbert College	Oct 16–27, 2002	41%	33%	6%	3%	0%
We the People/Wisconsin	Oct 20–21, 2002	46%	38%	8%	3%	0%
Research 2000	Oct 4–7, 2002	44%	36%	6%	3%	0%
Wisconsin Policy Research Institute	Sept 26–29, 2002	40%	31%	7%	4%	0%
Milwaukee Journal Sentinel	Sept 17–25, 2002	43%	35%	6%	1%	0%

=== Results ===
2002 Wisconsin gubernatorial election
Party	Candidate	Votes	%	±%
Democratic	Jim Doyle	800,515	45.09%	+6.39%
Republican	Scott McCallum (incumbent)	734,779	41.39%	−18.28%
Libertarian	Ed Thompson	185,455	10.45%	+9.82%
Green	Jim Young	44,111	2.48%	+2.48%
Reform	Alan D. Eisenberg	2,847	0.16%	
Independent	Ty A. Bollerud	2,637	0.15%	
Independent	Mike Managan	1,710	0.10%	
Independent	Aneb Jah Rasta	929	0.05%	
	Scattering	2,366	0.13%	
Majority		65,736	3.70%	
Total votes		1,775,349	100.00%	
Democratic gain from Republican		Swing	+24.67%	

=== Results by county ===
Richland County voted Democratic for the first time since 1924 and only the second time since 1857. Doyle was the first Democrat since Albert G. Schmedeman in 1932 to win Columbia County, Grant County, Green County, Iowa County and Sauk County. Doyle was also the first Democrat since Schmedeman in 1934 to win Marquette County

County	Jim Doyle Democratic		Scott McCallum Republican		Ed Thompson Libertarian		Jim Young Green		All others Various		Margin		Total votes cast
County	#	%	#	%	#	%	#	%	#	%	#	%	Total votes cast
Adams	3,160	46.17%	2,168	31.68%	1,355	19.80%	130	1.90%	31	0.45%	992	14.49%	6,844
Ashland	3,092	60.39%	1,572	30.70%	296	5.78%	134	2.62%	26	0.51%	1,520	29.69%	5,120
Barron	6,540	46.04%	6,239	43.92%	1,074	7.56%	293	2.06%	60	0.42%	301	2.12%	14,206
Bayfield	3,752	59.57%	1,948	30.93%	379	6.02%	200	3.18%	20	0.32%	1,804	28.64%	6,299
Brown	29,949	42.28%	32,368	45.70%	5,860	8.27%	2,068	2.92%	585	0.83%	-2,419	-3.42%	70,830
Buffalo	2,225	48.82%	1,706	37.43%	499	10.95%	103	2.26%	25	0.55%	519	11.39%	4,558
Burnett	3,004	46.54%	3,142	48.68%	205	3.18%	91	1.41%	12	0.19%	-138	-2.14%	6,454
Calumet	5,528	39.43%	6,844	48.81%	1,198	8.54%	360	2.57%	91	0.65%	-1,316	-9.39%	14,021
Chippewa	7,539	40.50%	7,592	40.79%	2,868	15.41%	513	2.76%	102	0.55%	-53	-0.28%	18,614
Clark	3,826	36.93%	4,031	38.91%	2,221	21.44%	233	2.25%	48	0.46%	-205	-1.98%	10,359
Columbia	7,581	41.84%	6,308	34.82%	3,585	19.79%	571	3.15%	72	0.40%	1,273	7.03%	18,117
Crawford	2,296	44.30%	1,879	36.25%	791	15.26%	188	3.63%	29	0.56%	417	8.05%	5,183
Dane	97,084	56.43%	41,810	24.30%	22,477	13.07%	9,806	5.70%	856	0.50%	55,274	32.13%	172,033
Dodge	8,607	32.61%	12,761	48.34%	4,416	16.73%	438	1.66%	174	0.66%	-4,154	-15.74%	26,396
Door	4,647	40.48%	5,333	46.45%	849	7.39%	558	4.86%	94	0.82%	-686	-5.98%	11,481
Douglas	9,291	63.82%	4,153	28.53%	732	5.03%	283	1.94%	98	0.67%	5,138	35.30%	14,557
Dunn	5,525	48.45%	4,560	39.99%	911	7.99%	364	3.19%	43	0.38%	965	8.46%	11,403
Eau Claire	15,958	48.75%	11,946	36.49%	3,241	9.90%	1,403	4.29%	188	0.57%	4,012	12.26%	32,736
Florence	609	39.73%	842	54.92%	70	4.57%	12	0.78%	0	0.00%	-233	-15.20%	1,533
Fond du Lac	10,394	33.16%	17,653	56.31%	2,540	8.10%	586	1.87%	174	0.56%	-7,259	-23.16%	31,347
Forest	1,435	44.76%	1,332	41.55%	371	11.57%	59	1.84%	9	0.28%	103	3.21%	3,206
Grant	6,175	43.07%	5,946	41.47%	1,832	12.78%	334	2.33%	50	0.35%	229	1.60%	14,337
Green	5,148	46.60%	3,581	32.42%	1,930	17.47%	345	3.12%	43	0.39%	1,567	14.18%	11,047
Green Lake	2,232	34.70%	3,322	51.65%	685	10.65%	156	2.43%	37	0.57%	-1,090	-16.95%	6,432
Iowa	3,606	47.29%	2,234	29.29%	1,422	18.65%	350	4.59%	14	0.18%	1,372	17.99%	7,626
Iron	1,461	51.52%	900	31.73%	413	14.56%	57	2.01%	5	0.18%	561	19.78%	2,836
Jackson	2,770	43.82%	2,101	33.24%	1,271	20.11%	168	2.66%	11	0.17%	669	10.58%	6,321
Jefferson	9,243	36.71%	11,237	44.63%	3,912	15.54%	609	2.42%	178	0.71%	-1,994	-7.92%	25,179
Juneau	2,249	31.35%	2,118	29.53%	2,629	36.65%	160	2.23%	17	0.24%	-380 (Note: Thompson's margin over Doyle)	-5.30%	7,173
Kenosha	21,922	55.34%	14,833	37.45%	2,179	5.50%	436	1.10%	241	0.61%	7,089	17.90%	39,611
Kewaunee	2,584	38.36%	2,989	44.37%	682	10.12%	208	3.09%	273	4.05%	-405	-6.01%	6,736
La Crosse	15,255	43.36%	12,578	35.75%	6,075	17.27%	1,057	3.00%	221	0.63%	2,677	7.61%	35,186
Lafayette	2,313	43.36%	1,648	30.89%	1,244	23.32%	122	2.29%	8	0.15%	665	12.46%	5,335
Langlade	3,320	43.85%	3,238	42.77%	843	11.13%	135	1.78%	35	0.46%	82	1.08%	7,571
Lincoln	4,379	42.97%	3,664	35.96%	1,872	18.37%	197	1.93%	78	0.77%	715	7.02%	10,190
Manitowoc	11,993	44.37%	11,533	42.67%	2,650	9.80%	642	2.38%	213	0.79%	460	1.70%	27,031
Marathon	18,940	43.87%	16,904	39.15%	5,989	13.87%	1,065	2.47%	275	0.64%	2,036	4.72%	43,173
Marinette	6,032	43.34%	6,627	47.61%	900	6.47%	302	2.17%	58	0.42%	-595	-4.27%	13,919
Marquette	2,034	40.29%	1,862	36.89%	986	19.53%	151	2.99%	15	0.30%	172	3.41%	5,048
Menominee	681	72.52%	171	18.21%	61	6.50%	20	2.13%	6	0.64%	510	54.31%	939
Milwaukee	150,877	56.36%	95,015	35.49%	15,891	5.94%	4,186	1.56%	1,756	0.66%	55,862	20.87%	267,725
Monroe	3,275	25.61%	3,433	26.85%	5,809	45.43%	223	1.74%	47	0.37%	-2,376 (Note: Thompson's margin over McCallum)	-18.58%	12,787
Oconto	4,561	39.74%	5,420	47.22%	1,170	10.19%	257	2.24%	70	0.61%	-859	-7.48%	11,478
Oneida	5,748	42.64%	5,226	38.77%	2,143	15.90%	283	2.10%	79	0.59%	522	3.87%	13,479
Outagamie	21,158	41.92%	23,695	46.94%	3,799	7.53%	1,462	2.90%	364	0.72%	-2,537	-5.03%	50,478
Ozaukee	10,542	31.46%	20,486	61.14%	1,891	5.64%	410	1.22%	176	0.53%	-9,944	-29.68%	33,505
Pepin	1,234	51.91%	870	36.60%	203	8.54%	60	2.52%	10	0.42%	364	15.31%	2,377
Pierce	5,855	49.38%	5,290	44.61%	401	3.38%	231	1.95%	80	0.67%	565	4.77%	11,857
Polk	6,901	47.56%	6,789	46.79%	422	2.91%	333	2.30%	64	0.44%	112	0.77%	14,509
Portage	11,954	49.86%	7,157	29.85%	3,265	13.62%	1,463	6.10%	135	0.56%	4,797	20.01%	23,974
Price	2,670	41.86%	2,324	36.44%	1,219	19.11%	144	2.26%	21	0.33%	346	5.42%	6,378
Racine	27,859	47.32%	26,654	45.28%	3,442	5.85%	572	0.97%	341	0.58%	1,205	2.05%	58,868
Richland	1,961	36.25%	1,958	36.19%	1,307	24.16%	176	3.25%	8	0.15%	3	0.06%	5,410
Rock	26,648	52.98%	14,929	29.68%	7,418	14.75%	910	1.81%	396	0.79%	11,719	23.30%	50,301
Rusk	2,305	38.29%	2,208	36.68%	1,345	22.34%	138	2.29%	24	0.40%	97	1.61%	6,020
Sauk	7,286	41.14%	5,629	31.79%	3,953	22.32%	752	4.25%	89	0.50%	1,657	9.36%	17,709
Sawyer	2,626	43.07%	2,890	47.40%	434	7.12%	113	1.85%	34	0.56%	-264	-4.33%	6,097
Shawano	4,752	39.54%	5,734	47.71%	1,203	10.01%	282	2.35%	47	0.39%	-982	-8.17%	12,018
Sheboygan	17,521	42.48%	19,634	47.60%	3,360	8.15%	532	1.29%	203	0.49%	-2,113	-5.12%	41,250
St. Croix	8,803	41.66%	11,076	52.41%	739	3.50%	360	1.70%	154	0.73%	-2,273	-10.76%	21,132
Taylor	2,498	36.83%	2,426	35.77%	1,708	25.18%	117	1.73%	33	0.49%	72	1.06%	6,782
Trempealeau	4,196	46.68%	2,818	31.35%	1,678	18.67%	266	2.96%	30	0.33%	1,378	15.33%	8,988
Vernon	3,410	38.75%	2,813	31.96%	2,229	25.33%	323	3.67%	26	0.30%	597	6.78%	8,801
Vilas	3,320	37.05%	4,305	48.04%	1,075	12.00%	187	2.09%	75	0.84%	-985	-10.99%	8,962
Walworth	9,764	37.32%	13,319	50.91%	2,395	9.15%	505	1.93%	179	0.68%	-3,555	-13.59%	26,162
Washburn	2,895	47.14%	2,593	42.22%	495	8.06%	132	2.15%	26	0.42%	302	4.92%	6,141
Washington	11,480	27.69%	25,592	61.72%	3,765	9.08%	439	1.06%	189	0.46%	-14,112	-34.03%	41,465
Waukesha	42,327	29.78%	88,661	62.39%	8,846	6.22%	1,631	1.15%	649	0.46%	-46,334	-32.60%	142,114
Waupaca	5,672	37.67%	7,369	48.93%	1,481	9.83%	440	2.92%	97	0.64%	-1,697	-11.27%	15,059
Waushara	2,909	39.96%	3,371	46.30%	799	10.98%	175	2.40%	26	0.36%	-462	-6.35%	7,280
Winnebago	22,425	43.73%	23,110	45.07%	3,708	7.23%	1,632	3.18%	400	0.78%	-685	-1.34%	51,275
Wood	10,704	44.64%	8,312	34.66%	4,349	18.14%	470	1.96%	146	0.61%	2,392	9.97%	23,981
Total	800,515	45.09%	734,779	41.39%	185,455	10.45%	44,111	2.48%	10,489	0.59%	65,736	3.70%	1,775,349

==== Counties that flipped Republican to Democratic ====
- Adams (largest city: Adams)
- Barron (largest city: Rice Lake)
- Buffalo (largest city: Mondovi)
- Columbia (largest city: Portage)
- Crawford (largest city: Prairie du Chien)
- Dunn (largest city: Menomonie)
- Eau Claire (largest city: Eau Claire)
- Forest (largest city: Crandon)
- Grant (largest city: Platteville)
- Green (largest city: Monore)
- Iowa (largest city: Dodgeville)
- Iron (largest city: Hurley)
- Jackson (largest city: Black River Falls)
- Kenosha (largest city: Kenosha)
- La Crosse (largest city: La Crosse)
- Lafayette (largest city: Darlington)
- Langlade (largest city: Antigo)
- Lincoln (largest city: Merrill)
- Manitowoc (largest city: Manitowoc)
- Marathon (largest city: Wausau)
- Marquette (largest city: Montello)
- Milwaukee (largest city: Milwaukee)
- Oneida (largest city: Rhinelander)
- Pepin (largest city: Durand)
- Pierce (largest city: River Falls)
- Polk (largest city: Amery)
- Portage (largest city: Stevens Points)
- Price (largest city: Park Falls)
- Racine (largest city: Racine)
- Richland (largest city: Richland Center)
- Rock (largest city: Janesville)
- Rusk (largest city: Ladysmith)
- Sauk (largest city: Baraboo)
- Taylor (largest city: Medford)
- Trempealeau (largest city: Arcadia)
- Vernon (largest city: Viroqua)
- Washburn (largest city: Spooner)
- Wood (largest city: Wisconsin Rapids)

==== Counties that flipped from Republican to Libertarian ====
- Juneau (largest city: Mauston)
- Monroe (largest city: Sparta)

== See also ==
- 2002 United States gubernatorial elections
