= Kathleen Falk =

American lawyer

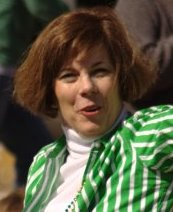
- Kathleen Falk in the 2009 St. Patrick's Day Parade, Madison WI

4th Executive of Dane County
- In office April 21, 1997 – April 18, 2011
- Preceded by: Richard J. Phelps
- Succeeded by: Joe Parisi

Assistant Attorney General of Wisconsin
- In office 1983–1997

Personal details
- Born: June 26, 1951 (age 75) Milwaukee, Wisconsin, U.S.
- Party: Democratic
- Spouse: Peter Bock (m. 2002)
- Children: Eric Phillips
- Education: University of Wisconsin Law School (J.D.); Stanford University (B.A.)
- Profession: Attorney, politician, policymaker

Kathleen Falk (born June 26, 1951) is an American attorney, politician, and policymaker from Wisconsin who served as Dane County Executive from 1997 until 2011. In 2013, she was appointed Regional Director of the U.S. Department of Health and Human Services, Region Five.

A Democrat, Falk unsuccessfully sought the party's nomination for Governor of Wisconsin in 2002 and in the 2012 recall election. In 2006, Falk defeated Democratic Attorney General Peg Lautenschlager to win the party's nomination for Attorney General, but was defeated by Republican J. B. Van Hollen in the general election.

Prior to running for elected office, Falk was a prosecutor and public-interest attorney. From 1983 to 1997, she was an assistant attorney general and public intervenor in the Wisconsin Department of Justice; she previously worked as a co-director and legal counsel of Wisconsin's Environmental Decade, an advocacy organization. Falk was the first woman to serve as Dane County Executive and to seek a major party's gubernatorial nomination in Wisconsin.

== Early life and career ==
Falk was raised in Waukesha County, Wisconsin. She earned a bachelor's degree in philosophy from Stanford University in 1973 and graduated from the University of Wisconsin Law School in 1976. She is also a graduate of Harvard University's Senior Executives in State and Local Government Program.

Following law school, Falk became the co-director and general counsel of Wisconsin's Environmental Decade, Inc., a non-profit, public interest organization devoted to environmental litigation and lobbying. Falk argued cases before the Wisconsin Supreme Court during her tenure there. In 1983, Falk was hired as an assistant attorney general in the Wisconsin Department of Justice. Attorney General Bronson La Follette appointed Falk to serve as Public Intervenor, in which capacity Falk performed litigation, lobbying, and advocacy on environmental protection matters. Falk's position was eliminated in 1995, during the tenure of Attorney General Jim Doyle, and Falk became an assistant attorney general at the department.

== Political career ==
=== County executive (1997-2010) ===
Falk made her first run for public office in 1996, running for Dane County Executive. She finished first in the runoff and eventually defeated a long-time county board member, Mike Blaska. She was later re-elected three times (2001, 2005, 2009). During her 14-year tenure, she implemented mergers of county departments, vetoed borrowing for jail construction and ended Dane County's practice of sending its inmates to other counties for incarceration. Falk enlarged the county sheriff's department by adding 134 new positions, opened a juvenile justice facility, and launched a community-based initiative aimed at gang prevention. Falk's budgets funded jail diversion programs for non-violent substance-addicted offenders, a home visitation model for at-risk families, and environmental programs focused on water quality and land conservation.

=== Statewide office races ===
In 2002, she unsuccessfully ran for Governor, losing the Democratic primary to Jim Doyle. Falk was Wisconsin's first woman candidate for governor from a major political party.

In 2006, Falk challenged and defeated Peg Lautenschlager in a Democratic primary for Wisconsin Attorney General. She went on to lose the general election race by fewer than 9,000 votes out of more than 2.1 million cast. Falk was a contender to challenge Wisconsin Governor Scott Walker in his recall attempt. She announced her candidacy on January 18, 2012, but lost in the Democratic gubernatorial primary to Milwaukee mayor Tom Barrett.

== Later career ==
In October 2010, Falk announced that she would step down midway through her fourth term as county executive in April 2011, citing an interest in contributing to public policy in a new way. She formally resigned at 8 am on December 21, 2010, in order to trigger a special election. Dane County Board of Supervisors chair Scott McDonell became acting County Executive, and appointed Jamie Kuhn to serve as the Interim County Executive starting January 7, 2011, after confirmation by the full board, to serve until the special election. Joe Parisi won the election on April 5, 2011, and on April 19 succeeded her as Dane County Executive. Her tenure as county executive was the longest in the office's history.

=== U.S. Department of Health & Human Services (2013–2017) ===
In September 2013, U.S. Department of Health and Human Services Secretary Kathleen Sebelius appointed Falk to serve as DHHS's Region V Director. Region V encompasses a six-state area that includes Indiana, Illinois, Michigan, Minnesota, Ohio and Wisconsin.

== Recognition ==
Falk has received awards and recognition from environmental groups, business interests, women's organizations, LGBT equality activists, disability rights advocates, conservation groups, the American Legion and domestic violence support groups.

In 2014, the Dane County Board and County Executive named a wildlife area along the Sugar River the Falk-Wells Sugar River Wildlife Area for Falk and her chief of staff, Topf Wells, in recognition of their commitment to preserving the county's natural resources.

Falk was inducted into the Wisconsin Conservation Hall of Fame in 2022.

== Personal life ==
Falk is married to former Democratic State Representative Peter Bock. She has one son, Eric Phillips, and is an avid baseball fan, bicyclist, hunter, and angler.

== Electoral history ==
Wisconsin Gubernatorial Recall Election 2012 - Democratic Primary
Party	Candidate	Votes	%	±%
Democratic	Tom Barrett	390,109	58	
Democratic	Kathleen Falk	228,940	34	
Democratic	Kathleen Vinehout	26,926	4	
Democratic	Doug La Follette	19,461	3	
Democratic	Gladys Huber	4,842	1	

Dane County Executive General Election 2009 (Non-partisan)
Party	Candidate	Votes	%	±%
Nonpartisan	Kathleen Falk	59,180	59.29	
Nonpartisan	Nancy Mistele	40,495	40.57	

Wisconsin Attorney General Election 2006
Party	Candidate	Votes	%	±%
Republican	J.B. Van Hollen	1,065,453	50.15	
Democratic	Kathleen Falk	1,056,594	49.74	

Wisconsin Gubernatorial Election 2002 - Democratic Primary
Party	Candidate	Votes	%	±%
Democratic	Jim Doyle	212,066	38.36	
Democratic	Tom Barrett	190,605	34.48	
Democratic	Kathleen Falk	150,161	27.16	

== Notes ==
Party political offices
Preceded by Peg Lautenschlager	Democratic nominee for Attorney General of Wisconsin; 2006	Succeeded by Scott Hassett
Preceded by Richard Phelps	Dane County Executive; 1997 – 2011	Succeeded by Joe Parisi
