= 2008 Wisconsin Supreme Court election =

- April 1, 2008
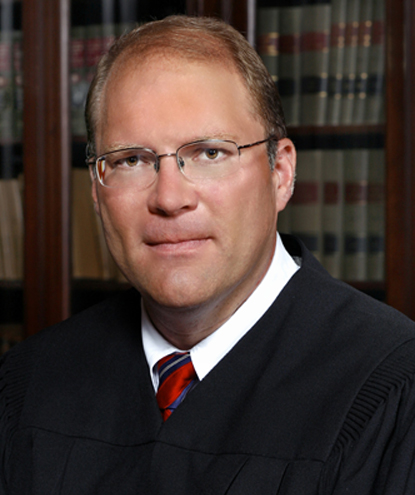

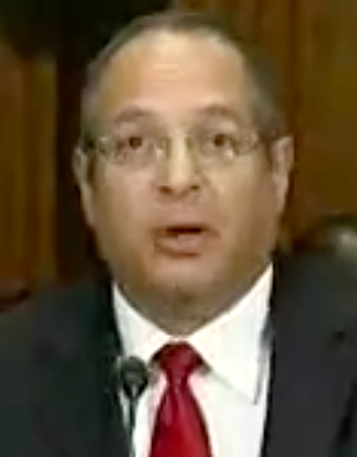
Candidate	Michael Gableman	Louis B. Butler
Popular vote	425,101	402,798
Percentage	51.19%	48.50%
- County results Gableman: 50–60% 60–70% 70–80% Butler: 40–50% 50–60% 60–70% 70–80%
Justice before election
Louis B. Butler
Elected Justice
Michael Gableman

The 2008 Wisconsin Supreme Court election was held on Tuesday, April 1, 2008, to elect a justice to the Wisconsin Supreme Court for a ten-year term. Burnett County circuit judge Michael Gableman narrowly defeated incumbent justice Louis B. Butler, shifting the ideology of the court to a conservative majority. The court's majority ideological lean would remain conservative until after the 2023 election.

The incumbent justice, Butler, had been appointed by Governor Jim Doyle in August 2004, and was running for his first full term. He was also the first (and so far only) African American justice on the Wisconsin Supreme Court.

This race is considered a turning point in the modern politicization of the Wisconsin Supreme Court. Candidates and outside interest groups spent about $6 million on the race, which was at that time the most expensive judicial election in state history.

Gableman won the election by 22,303 votes, carrying 51.19% of the electorate. Butler was the first incumbent justice to lose election since 1967.

== Primary election ==
There was no Supreme Court primary in 2008, as only two candidates ran for the seat.

=== Candidates ===
Advanced

- Louis B. Butler, incumbent Justice of the Wisconsin Supreme Court
- Michael Gableman, Wisconsin circuit judge for Burnett County

Withdrawn

- Charlie Schutze, Sun Prairie attorney

== General election ==
=== Advertising ===
Attack ads played a significant role in the campaign. Following the acrimonious 2007 Wisconsin Supreme Court election, the Wisconsin State Bar attempted to induce candidates for 2008 to take a pledge not to use attack ads, and to discourage their supporters from that practice. Butler signed the pledge and largely held his campaign to that standard. Gableman refused the pledge and accused the Bar of bias.

Gableman's outside allies outspent Butler's on television ads at a roughly 3:2 ratio. The largest spender on his behalf was the business lobbying group Wisconsin Manufacturers & Commerce (WMC). One of their first controversial ads was known as "technicalities" and criticized Butler for his dissent in the case of State v. Jensen. Jensen had been accused of poisoning his wife, Julie; she had written a letter, commonly referred to in Wisconsin as a "letter from the grave", stating that she believed she was being poisoned. The trial judge ruled the letter inadmissible, but the Wisconsin Supreme Court majority reversed him; Butler dissented. The ad accused Butler of focusing on technicalities and claimed he "almost jeopardized" the prosecution. Wisconsin Manufacturers & Commerce also ran another ad on this same case, accusing Butler of using loopholes for criminal defendants and calling him "Loophole Louie." The two ads ran more than 3,000 times in the Spring campaign.

Another ad, run by the conservative Coalition for America's Families, led by a former chairman of the Republican Party of Wisconsin, accused Butler of overturning a murder conviction despite overwhelming evidence of guilt. Butler's decision in that case had been based on new DNA evidence that undercut a critical element of the prosecution.

The most controversial ad of the campaign was run by Gableman's own campaign. The ad featured a mugshot of a convicted rapist side by side with a photo of Butler—both African American men—and implied Butler let the other man out of prison and allowed him to commit another rape. In fact, Butler—who was then a public defender assigned to the defendant—had failed to win the man's release. His subsequent rape was committed after he finished serving his prison sentence. The ad was only officially run 106 times, but was repeated dozens of times by news organizations discussing the contents. At the time, the ad was compared to the infamous Willie Horton ad from the 1988 United States presidential election. The ad was so egregious that 13 years later, journalists were still recalling it as "the most racist ad in the history of Wisconsin politics".

=== Results ===
Gableman prevailed, rendering Butler the first incumbent justice of the court to lose election since 1967.

2008 Wisconsin Supreme Court election
Party	Candidate	Votes	%	±%
General Election, April 1, 2008
Nonpartisan	Michael Gableman	425,101	51.19%	
Nonpartisan	Louis B. Butler (incumbent)	402,798	48.50%	+14.14pp
	Scattering	2,551	0.31%	
Plurality		22,303	2.69%	
Total votes		830,450	100.0%	

== Aftermath ==
=== Analysis ===
A significant factor in the outcome of the 2008 Supreme Court election was the decision by state party leaders to move up the state's presidential nominating contest from the Spring general election in April to the Spring primary in February. The presidential preference vote brought unprecedented turnout to the Spring primary, with over 1.5 million votes cast. The Supreme Court election, taking place 42 days later at the Spring general election, received only 830,450 votes, with a margin of victory of 22,303.

2008 was only the seventh instance in which an incumbent justice lost re-election to the court (after 1855, 1908, 1917, 1947, 1958, and 1967) The next instance in which an incumbent lost was when an appointed incumbent was defeated in 2020.

=== Impact ===
Heading into the election, the court had what some have described as a "liberal majority", with 3 liberal justices, 3 conservative justices, and one centrist judge. The result of the 2008 election flipped the court to a conservative majority. Replacing the liberal Butler with the conservative Gableman had a significant effect on the ideology of the Wisconsin Supreme Court in subsequent years, and was the start of fifteen years of conservative control of the state court. The conservative majority on the court would be important also in ratifying the policy agenda of Republican Governor Scott Walker and the Republican legislative majorities which would be elected two years later in the 2010 Wisconsin elections. Subsequent Wisconsin Supreme Court elections also became increasingly bitter and partisan, with outside groups only increasing their spending.

Another legacy of the election is also the career of Gableman, himself. After serving ten years on the court, he did not run for re-election in 2018. He went on to become an ally and supporter of Donald Trump, and—after Trump lost the 2020 United States presidential election—Gableman contributed to many of Trump's attempts to cast doubt on the election results. In 2021, Gableman was hired by Wisconsin Assembly speaker Robin Vos to conduct an independent investigation of Wisconsin's election. After a year of controversy and lawsuits, Gableman turned on Vos, endorsing a primary challenger against him in 2022. Vos fired him three days after the primary. Gableman continued to attack Wisconsin's election process, and targeted the Wisconsin Elections Commission administrator Meagan Wolfe, calling for her impeachment. In 2023 and 2024, he was involved in a negative ad campaign against Robin Vos and the unsuccessful campaign to recall him from office. Vos has subsequently said that his hiring Gableman was "probably the single biggest embarrassment that I have ever had," said Gableman should be disbarred, and called him "an embarrassment to the state."

== See also ==
- 2008 Wisconsin elections
