= 2008 Wisconsin elections =

- April 1, 2008; November 4, 2008

The 2008 Wisconsin fall general election was held on November 4, 2008. All of Wisconsin's eight seats in the United States House of Representatives were up for election. Within the state government, sixteen seats in the Wisconsin State Senate, and all 99 seats in the Wisconsin State Assembly were up for election. At the presidential level, voters chose ten electors to represent them in the Electoral College, which then helped select the president of the United States. The 2008 fall partisan primary was held on September 9, 2008.

In the fall general election, the Democratic presidential candidate, Senator Barack Obama, won Wisconsin's ten electoral votes, defeating Senator John McCain. There was no change to the partisan makeup of Wisconsin's congressional delegation. The state senate saw no change in partisan composition, as all incumbents were re-elected, and vacancies in seats held by both parties were filled with no change to the party that held the seat. In the state assembly, Democrats gained five seats while one Independent was re-elected after having previously served as a Republican.

The 2008 Wisconsin spring election was held on April 1, 2008. This election saw a contested race for the Wisconsin Supreme Court, a constitutional amendment referendum, as well as various nonpartisan local and judicial offices. The 2008 spring primary election was held on February 19, 2008. In an unusual move, the presidential preference primary was held at the Spring primary election rather than the Spring general election; it was part of a national movement in which half the states rushed to hold their presidential primaries in February.

== Federal offices ==
=== President ===
Incumbent president George W. Bush was term limited and could not run for another term. With no incumbent on the ballot, both party nominating contests featured a wide array of candidates. Both nominating contests were still unresolved when Wisconsin voted in their presidential preference primaries. In the general election, Wisconsin voters chose electors for the Democratic nominee, U.S. Senator Barack Obama (D–IL).

==== Democratic primary ====
For its part in the 2008 Democratic Party presidential primaries, Wisconsin's presidential preference primary was on the ballot for Wisconsin's Spring primary election, held on Tuesday, February 19, 2008. At the time of the Wisconsin primary, three candidates were still in the race for the nomination, U.S. senators Barack Obama (D–IL) and Hillary Clinton (D–NY), and former U.S. senator Mike Gravel (D–AK), though Gravel did not have a viable path to the nomination at this point. The candidate field originally also included U.S. senators Joe Biden (D–DE), Evan Bayh (D–IN), and Chris Dodd (D–CT), former U.S. senator John Edwards (D–NC), governors Bill Richardson (D–NM) and Tom Vilsack (D–IA), and U.S. representative Dennis Kucinich (D–OH), all of their names still appeared on the Wisconsin ballot, except Bayh and Vilsack.

Barack Obama won the Wisconsin primary, receiving 58% of the popular vote and earning 42 of 74 pledged delegates from the state. At the time, it was his eleventh consecutive victory in a primary or caucus, building a delegate lead that he would have to fight to retain through another three months of primary contests.

==== Republican primary ====
In the 2008 Republican Party presidential primaries, the Wisconsin Republican presidential preference primary was also held at the Spring primary, February 19, 2008. At the time of the Wisconsin primary, three candidates were still in the race for the nomination, U.S. senator John McCain (R–AZ), former governor Mike Huckabee (R–AR), and U.S. representative Ron Paul (R–TX). The candidate field originally included Wisconsin's incumbent governor Tommy Thompson, but he dropped out before the Iowa caucuses. The field also previously included U.S. senator Sam Brownback (R–KS), actor and former U.S. senator Fred Thompson (R–TN), U.S. representatives Duncan L. Hunter (R–CA) and Tom Tancredo (R–CO), governors Mitt Romney (R–MA) and Jim Gilmore (R–VA), mayor Rudy Giuliani (R–NY), businessman John H. Cox, and perennial candidate Alan Keyes. In addition to the three remaining candidates, Romney, Giuliani, Thompson, Hunter, and Tacredo were also on the ballot in Wisconsin.

John McCain won the Wisconsin primary, receiving 55% of the popular vote and earning 34 of 40 pledged delegates from the state. Huckabee would with draw from the race less than a month later.

==== General election ====
The presidential election was held at the Fall general election, November 4, 2008. Barack Obama won the state with 56% of the vote, it was the largest majority the state had given to a presidential candidate since Lyndon B. Johnson in 1964.

=== U.S. House ===
The 2008 United States House of Representatives elections in Wisconsin were held on November 4, 2008, to elect Wisconsin's delegation to the United States House of Representatives for the 111th United States Congress. At the time of the 2008 election, Wisconsin had eight congressional districts. All eight of Wisconsin's incumbent U.S. representatives won re-election in 2008. At the time the delegation was composed of five Democrats and three Republicans.

District	Incumbent			This race	
District	Representative	Party	First elected	Results	Candidates
Wisconsin 1	Paul Ryan	Republican	1998	Incumbent re-elected.	▌ ✓ Paul Ryan (Rep.) 64.0%; ▌Marge Krupp (Dem.) 34.7%; ▌Joseph Kexel (Lib.) 1.3%
Wisconsin 2	Tammy Baldwin	Democratic	1998	Incumbent re-elected.	▌ ✓ Tammy Baldwin (Dem.) 69.3%; ▌Peter Theron (Rep.) 30.6%
Wisconsin 3	Ron Kind	Democratic	1996	Incumbent re-elected.	▌ ✓ Ron Kind (Dem. 63.2%; ▌Paul Stark (Rep.) 34.4%; ▌Kevin Barrett (Lib.) 2.3%
Wisconsin 4	Gwen Moore	Democratic	2004	Incumbent re-elected.	▌ ✓ Gwen Moore (Dem.) 87.6%; ▌Michael LaForest (Ind.) 11.5%
Wisconsin 5	Jim Sensenbrenner	Republican	1978	Incumbent re-elected.	▌ ✓ Jim Sensenbrenner (Rep.) 79.6%; ▌Robert R. Raymond (Ind.) 20.2%
Wisconsin 6	Tom Petri	Republican	1979	Incumbent re-elected.	▌ ✓ Tom Petri (Rep.) 63.7%; ▌Roger Kittelson (Dem.) 36.2%
Wisconsin 7	Dave Obey	Democratic	1969	Incumbent re-elected.	▌ ✓ Dave Obey (Dem.) 60.8%; ▌Dan Mielke (Rep.) 39.1%
Wisconsin 8	Steve Kagen	Democratic	2006	Incumbent re-elected.	▌ ✓ Steve Kagen (Dem.) 54.0%; ▌John Gard (Rep.) 45.9%

== State offices ==
=== Legislative ===
==== State Senate ====
The 16 even-numbered districts out of the 33 seats in the Wisconsin State Senate were up for re-election in 2008. Prior to the election Democrats held the majority with 17 seats, Republicans held 14 seats, and two seats were vacant. In the election, both parties regained their vacant seats and returned to the 18 seats held by Democrats and 15 seats held by Republicans which was seen after the prior election.

Seats	Party (majority caucus shading)		Total
Seats	Democratic	Republican	Total
Total after last election (2006)	18	15	33
Total before this election	18	15	33
Up for election	8	8	16
This election	8	8	16
Total after this election	18	15	33
Change in total	Steady	Steady	

==== State Assembly ====
All of the 99 seats in the Wisconsin State Assembly were on the ballot for the Fall general election, November 4, 2008. Prior to the election, 52 seats were held by Republicans, 47 seats were held by Democrats, and one seat was held by an independent. In the election, Republicans failed to defend their majority and Democrats took a majority of seats for the first time in 14 years.

Seats	Party (majority caucus shading)			Total	Vacant
Seats	Democratic	Ind.	Republican	Total	Vacant
Total after last election (2006)	47	0	52	99	0
Total before this election	47	1	51	99	0
Up for election	47	1	51	99	
This election	52	1	46	99	
Total after this election	52	1	46	99	0
Change in total	▲3	Steady	▼3		

=== Judicial ===
==== State Supreme Court ====
Judge Michael Gableman was elected with 51% of the vote, defeating incumbent Justice Louis Butler with 49% of the vote. The heavy spending of outside interest groups in this race, including Wisconsin Manufacturers & Commerce, inspired some to call for reforms to Wisconsin election law and the selection of judges. Gableman's victory also shifted the Court in a more conservative direction, establishing a conservative majority that would persist for 15 years.

Wisconsin Supreme Court Election, 2008
Party	Candidate	Votes	%	±%
General Election, April 1, 2008
Nonpartisan	Michael Gableman	425,101	51.19%	
Nonpartisan	Louis B. Butler (incumbent)	402,798	48.50%	+14.14pp
	Scattering	2,551	0.31%	
Plurality		22,303	2.69%	
Total votes		830,450	100.0%	

==== State Court of Appeals ====
Three seats on the Wisconsin Court of Appeals were up for election on April 1, 2008.

- In District I, incumbent judge Patricia S. Curley was elected to her third six-year term without opposition.
- In District II, incumbent judge Lisa Neubauer, appointed by Governor Jim Doyle in 2007, won her first six-year term, defeating attorney William Gleisner.
- In District IV, incumbent judge Burnie Bridge, appointed by Governor Jim Doyle in 2007, won her first six-year term without opposition.

Wisconsin Court of Appeals District II Election, 2008
Party	Candidate	Votes	%	±%
General Election, April 1, 2008
Nonpartisan	Lisa S. Neubauer (incumbent)	138,241	62.60%	
Nonpartisan	William C. Gleisner III	82,302	37.27%	
	Scattering	286	0.13%	
Plurality		55,939	25.36%	
Total votes		220,543	100.0%	

==== State Circuit Courts ====
Thirty nine of the state's 247 circuit court seats were on the ballot for the Spring general election, April 1, 2008. Of those seats, six were newly created. Only 9 seats were contested. One incumbent justice faced a challenger and was defeated.

Circuit	Branch	Incumbent	Elected			Defeated			Defeated in Primary
Circuit	Branch	Incumbent	Name	Votes	%	Name	Votes	%	Name(s)
Barron	2	Timothy M. Doyle	Timothy M. Doyle	8,423	99.67%	--Unopposed--			
Barron	3	--New Seat--	James D. Babbitt	6,857	67.92%	Jim McLaughlin	3,231	32.01%	
Chippewa	1	Roderick A. Cameron	Roderick A. Cameron	6,736	99.56%	--Unopposed--			
Chippewa	3	--New Seat--	Steven R. Cray	4,496	52.96%	Julie Anderl	3,994	47.04%	Robert A. Ferg
Dane	1	John W. Markson	John W. Markson	45,929	99.46%	--Unopposed--			
Dane	7	William E. Hanrahan	William E. Hanrahan	45,847	99.52%	--Unopposed--			
Dodge	1	Daniel W. Klossner	Brian A. Pfitzinger	8,380	53.63%	William H. Gergen	7,236	46.31%	
Dodge	4	--New Seat--	Steven Bauer	12,803	99.63%	--Unopposed--			
Eau Claire	2	Michael Schumacher	Michael Schumacher	7,969	99.20%	--Unopposed--			
Florence–Forest		Robert A. Kennedy Jr.	Leon D. Stenz	1,629	51.16%	Robert A. Kennedy Jr.	1,555	48.84%	Douglas J. Drexler
Fond du Lac	1	Dale L. English	Dale L. English	10,925	99.73%	--Unopposed--			
Jackson		Gerald W. Laabs	Eric F. Stutz	1,943	99.03%	--Unopposed--			
Juneau	2	--New Seat--	Paul S. Curran	2,364	57.16%	Stacy A. Smith	1,770	42.79%	
Kenosha	3	Bruce E. Schroeder	Bruce E. Schroeder	16,926	99.01%	--Unopposed--			
Marathon	3	Vincent K. Howard	Vincent K. Howard	14,763	99.43%	--Unopposed--			
Marinette	1	David G. Miron	David G. Miron	4,253	99.74%	--Unopposed--			
Marinette	2	Tim A. Duket	Tim A. Duket	4,198	99.81%	--Unopposed--			
Menominee–Shawano	1	James R. Habeck	James R. Habeck	5,045	99.39%	--Unopposed--			
Milwaukee	17	Francis T. Wasielewski	Francis T. Wasielewski	107,208	98.75%	--Unopposed--			
Milwaukee	21	Bill Brash	Bill Brash	104,299	98.76%	--Unopposed--			
Milwaukee	27	Kevin E. Martens	Kevin E. Martens	105,520	98.95%	--Unopposed--			
Milwaukee	31	Daniel A. Noonan	Daniel A. Noonan	105,413	98.95%	--Unopposed--			
Milwaukee	31	Michael D. Guolee	Michael D. Guolee	105,561	98.89%	--Unopposed--			
Milwaukee	40	--Vacant--	Rebecca Dallet	90,029	66.88%	Jeffrey Norman	44,034	32.71%	
Milwaukee	41	John J. DiMotto	John J. DiMotto	106,359	99.00%	--Unopposed--			
Oneida	1	Patrick F. O'Melia	Patrick F. O'Melia	7,926	98.99%	--Unopposed--			
Outagamie	2	Nancy J. Krueger	Nancy J. Krueger	16,464	66.97%	Dan Hoff	8,106	32.97%	Maureen Roberts Budiac
Outagamie	3	Mitchell J. Metropulos	Mitchell J. Metropulos	12,888	52.20%	Carrie Schneider	11,790	47.75%	
Polk	1	Molly E. GaleWyrick	Molly E. GaleWyrick	4,896	99.39%	--Unopposed--			
Price		Douglas T. Fox	Douglas T. Fox	2,408	99.50%	--Unopposed--			
Racine	7	Charles H. Constantine	Charles H. Constantine	21,678	99.57%	--Unopposed--			
Rock	1	James P. Daley	James P. Daley	14,227	99.61%	--Unopposed--			
St. Croix	1	Eric J. Lundell	Eric J. Lundell	8,306	99.37%	--Unopposed--			
St. Croix	4	--New Seat--	Howard Cameron	4,949	50.95%	Mark J. Gherty	4,751	48.91%	Carol L. Law; Charles B. Harris; Ken Sortedahl
Washington	2	James K. Muehlbauer	James K. Muehlbauer	16,265	99.69%	--Unopposed--			
Waukesha	2	Mark S. Gempeler	Mark S. Gempeler	47,839	99.69%	--Unopposed--			
Waukesha	5	Lee S. Dreyfus Jr.	Lee S. Dreyfus Jr.	49,635	99.76%	--Unopposed--			
Waukesha	5	Patrick C. Haughney	Patrick C. Haughney	46,690	99.78%	--Unopposed--			
Wood	1	Gregory J. Potter	Gregory J. Potter	12,607	99.64%	--Unopposed--			

=== Ballot measures ===
Prohibit Partial Veto Authority
- April 1, 2008
- Partial Veto. Shall section 10(1)(c) of article V of the constitution be amended to prohibit the governor, in exercising his or her partial veto authority, from creating a new sentence by combining parts of two or more sentences of the enrolled bill?

Results
Choice	Votes	%
Yes	575,582	70.61%
No	239,613	29.39%
Total votes	815,195	100.00%

==== Prohibit Partial Veto Authority ====
By a margin of 335,969 votes, the Wisconsin voters chose to amend the state's Constitution to implement restrictions on the governor's ability to partially veto legislation. The purpose of the amendment was to reduce the veto power of the Governor, sometimes known as the "Frankenstein veto", which has been historically used by governors of irrespective of their party to rework legislation.

The line-item veto, also known as a Frankenstein veto, is a historic fixture of Wisconsin politics and acted as a way for the governor to bypass the state legislature regarding legislation as the veto gave the governor the ability to strike out words, numbers, and even entire sentences from different bills, though this ability was reduced over time. The veto was used by governors of both parties, such as Patrick Lucey (D), Tony Earl (D), and Tommy Thompson (R) and Jim Doyle (D) during their terms. During all their terms, the veto was also restricted via judicial action, such as in State ex. rel. Wisconsin Telephone Co. v. Henry, which recognized the ability of the governor to use such a veto, and Risser v. Klauser, which prohibited the governor from using a write-in veto to alter monetary amounts which were not appropriated by the legislature. The veto has also been restricted in prior constitutional amendments, such as in 1990, when voters approved an amendment to end the "pick-a-letter" veto, which was the selective vetoing of letters or numerical characters to form a new word.

== Local elections ==
=== Milwaukee County ===
==== Milwaukee Mayor ====
A regularly scheduled mayoral election was held in Milwaukee, concurrent with the Spring general election, April 1, 2008. Incumbent mayor Tom Barrett defeated challenger Andrew J. Shaw and was re-elected to a second four-year term.
