= Rebecca Taibleson =

American judge (born 1983)

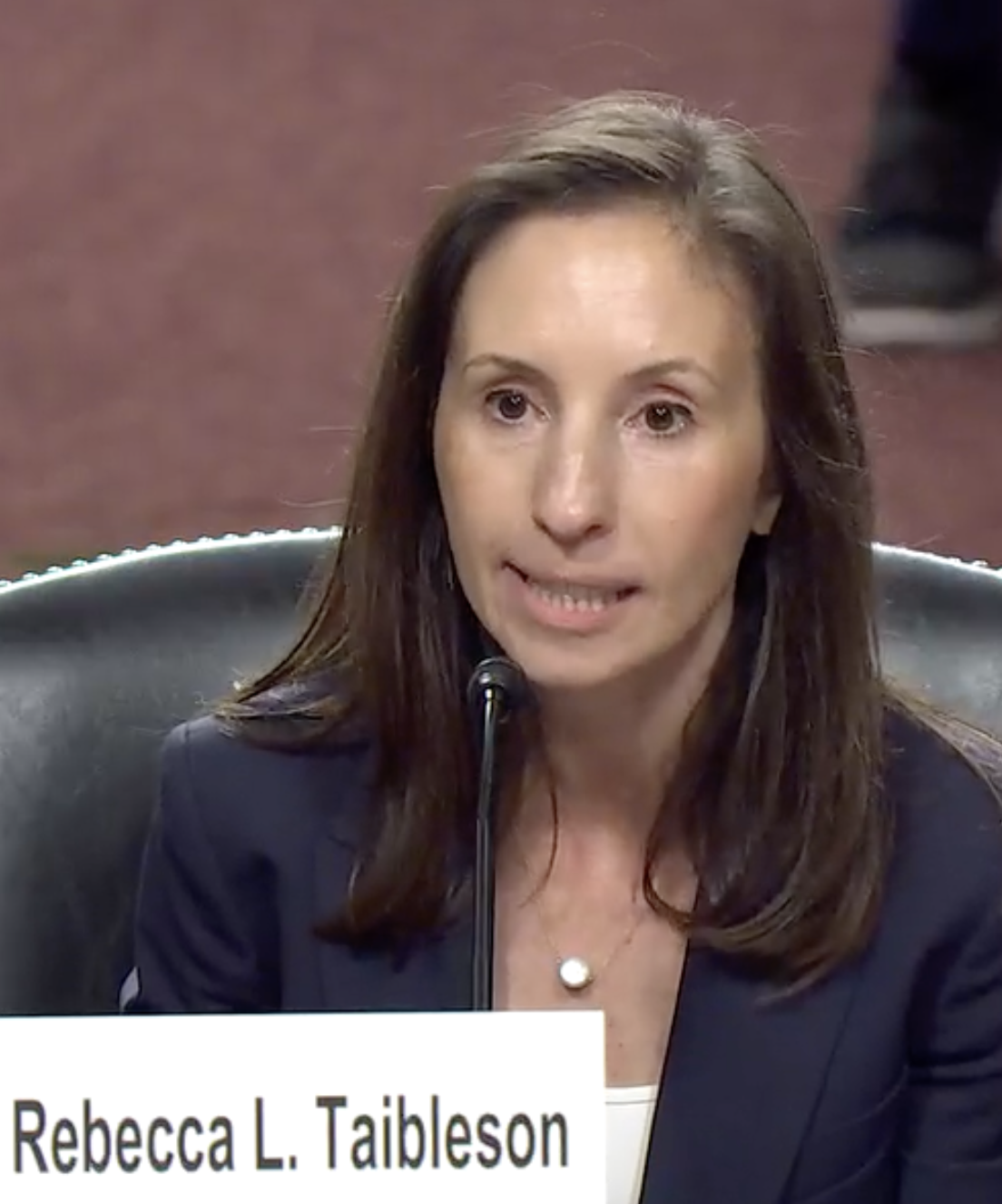

Judge of the United States Court of Appeals for the Seventh Circuit
- Incumbent
- Assumed office November 3, 2025
- Appointed by: Donald Trump
- Preceded by: Diane S. Sykes

Personal details
- Born: Rebecca Liane Krauss; 1983 (age 42–43) Sherbrooke, Quebec, Canada
- Relatives: Michael I. Krauss (father)
- Education: Yale University (BA, JD)

Rebecca Liane Taibleson (née Krauss; born 1983) is an American lawyer who has served as a United States circuit judge of the United States Court of Appeals for the Seventh Circuit since 2025. She was previously an assistant United States attorney in the Eastern District of Wisconsin.

== Early life and education ==
Taibleson was born Rebecca Liane Krauss in 1983 in Sherbrooke, Quebec, Canada. She received a Bachelor of Arts, magna cum laude, from Yale University in 2005. She completed her first year at Stanford Law School before transferring and receiving a Juris Doctor from Yale Law School in 2010. She served as a law clerk for Judge Brett Kavanaugh of the United States Court of Appeals for the District of Columbia Circuit from 2010 to 2011, then clerked for Justice Antonin Scalia at the U.S. Supreme Court from 2011 to 2012.

== Career ==
Taibleson was an associate at Kirkland & Ellis from 2012 to 2016. From 2016 to 2025, she was an assistant United States attorney for the Eastern District of Wisconsin, where she was co-chief of the office's Appellate Division. She concurrently served as an assistant to the Solicitor General of the United States in the United States Department of Justice from 2019 to 2022 having argued two cases before the Supreme Court: Torres v. Madrid and United States v. Taylor.

=== Federal judicial service ===
On August 14, 2025, President Donald Trump announced his intention to nominate Taibleson to a seat on the United States Court of Appeals for the Seventh Circuit vacated by Judge Diane S. Sykes. The nomination was transmitted to the United States Senate on September 15, 2025. The United States Senate Committee on the Judiciary voted 12–10 to advance her nomination to the full Senate on October 9, 2025. On October 23, 2025, the Senate invoked cloture on her nomination by a 50–45 vote. On October 27, 2025, her nomination was confirmed by a 52–46 vote. She received her judicial commission on November 3, 2025.

== Personal life ==
Taibleson married Benjamin Philip Taibleson in July 2011. They met while both were separately preparing to climb Mount Everest. The couple are Jewish. Taibleson is the daughter of attorneys Cynthia Conner-Krauss and Michael I. Krauss, a professor emeritus of law at Antonin Scalia Law School. She resides in Fox Point, Wisconsin.

== See also ==
- List of law clerks for the ninth seat of the Supreme Court of the United States

Legal offices
Preceded by Diane S. Sykes	Judge of the United States Court of Appeals for the Seventh Circuit; 2025–present	Incumbent
