= Diane S. Sykes =

American judge (born 1957)

Diane Sykes
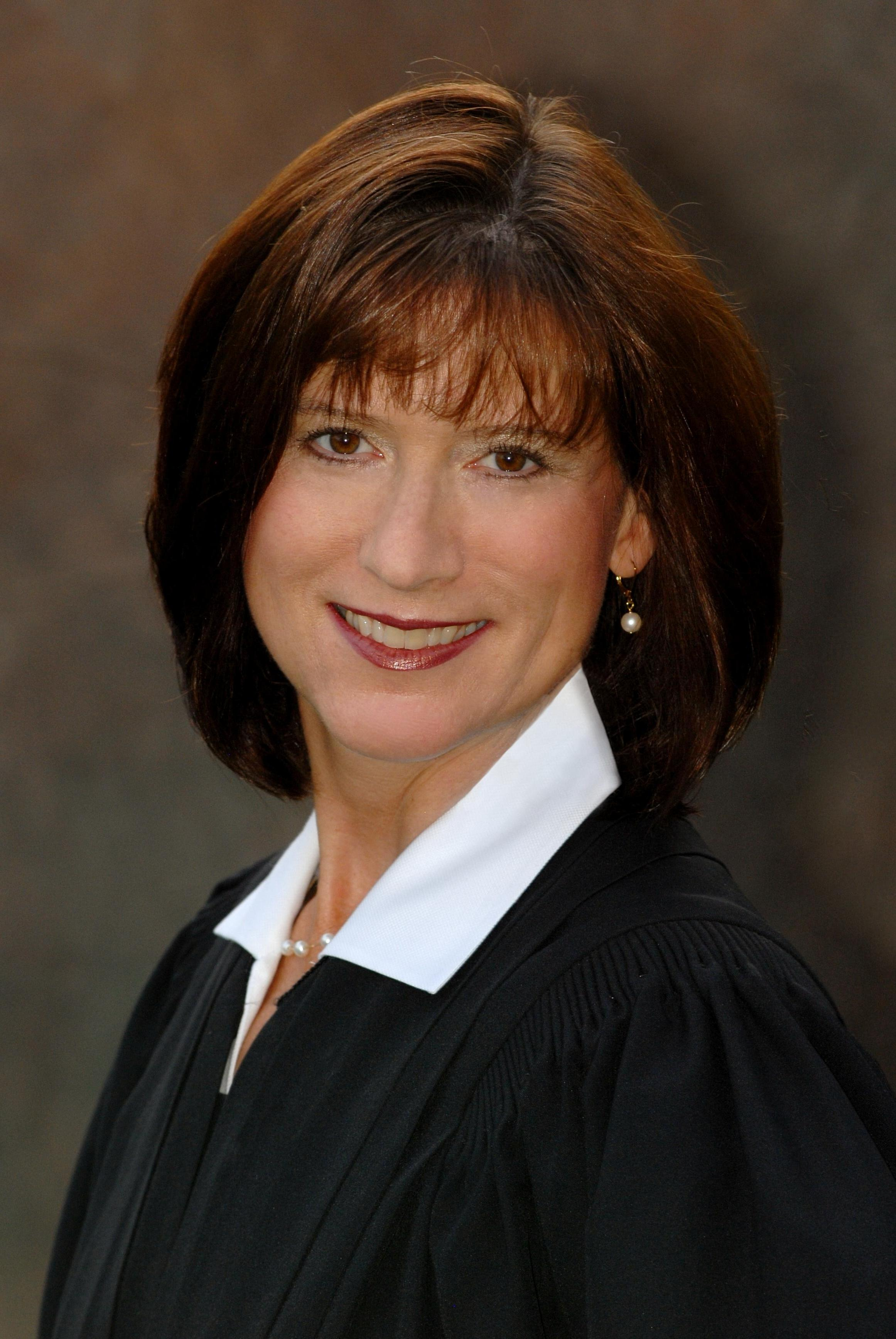

Senior Judge of the United States Court of Appeals for the Seventh Circuit
- Incumbent
- Assumed office October 1, 2025

Chief Judge of the United States Court of Appeals for the Seventh Circuit
- In office July 3, 2020 – October 1, 2025
- Preceded by: Diane Wood
- Succeeded by: Michael B. Brennan

Judge of the United States Court of Appeals for the Seventh Circuit
- In office July 1, 2004 – October 1, 2025
- Appointed by: George W. Bush
- Preceded by: John Louis Coffey
- Succeeded by: Rebecca Taibleson

Justice of the Wisconsin Supreme Court
- In office September 7, 1999 – July 1, 2004
- Appointed by: Tommy Thompson
- Preceded by: Donald W. Steinmetz
- Succeeded by: Louis B. Butler

Judge of the Milwaukee County Circuit Court Branch 43
- In office August 1, 1992 – September 1999
- Preceded by: Seat established
- Succeeded by: Marshall Murray

Personal details
- Born: Diane Elizabeth Schwerm; December 23, 1957 (age 68) Milwaukee, Wisconsin, U.S.
- Education: Northwestern University (BS); Marquette University (JD)

Diane Schwerm Sykes (née Diane Elizabeth Schwerm; born December 23, 1957) is an American jurist and lawyer who serves as a senior United States circuit judge of the U.S. Court of Appeals for the Seventh Circuit. She served as a justice of the Wisconsin Supreme Court from 1999 to 2004.

== Early life and education ==
Sykes father, Gerald Schwerm, was Brown Deer village manager and later director of Milwaukee County Public Works, overseeing major public works projects, including an expansion of Mitchell International Airport. Her mother, Joyce Hanrahan Schwerm, was a guidance counselor at Shorewood High School who died at 59. She is of German and Irish ancestry. Sykes graduated from Brown Deer High School in 1976 and then earned a Bachelor of Science degree in journalism at Northwestern University in 1980, and a Juris Doctor at Marquette University Law School in 1984. Between college and law school she worked as a reporter for The Milwaukee Journal.

== Legal career ==
After law school, from 1984 to 1985, Sykes clerked for Judge Terence T. Evans of the United States District Court for the Eastern District of Wisconsin. From 1985 to 1992, she worked in private practice as a litigator for Whyte & Hirschboeck, a medium-sized law firm in Milwaukee. Sykes won election to a newly created trial judge seat on the Milwaukee County Circuit Court in 1992, serving in the misdemeanor, felony, and civil divisions.

She left the trial court in 1999 when she was appointed to the Wisconsin Supreme Court, to fill a vacancy for Justice Donald W. Steinmetz. After being appointed to the Wisconsin Supreme Court, she was elected to the Supreme Court in April 2000, defeating Louis B. Butler, who was later appointed to the Wisconsin Supreme Court by Wisconsin Governor Jim Doyle in 2004.

== Federal judicial service ==
President George W. Bush nominated Sykes to a seat on the United States Court of Appeals for the Seventh Circuit on November 14, 2003. The Senate Judiciary Committee approved her nomination by a 14–5 vote on March 11, 2004. The United States Senate confirmed her on June 24, 2004, by a 70–27 vote. She received her commission on July 1, 2004. She became Chief Judge on July 3, 2020.

In 2005, President Bush seriously considered nominating Sykes to succeed Sandra Day O'Connor on the Supreme Court of the United States. In 2017, Sykes was on President Donald Trump's list of potential Supreme Court justices.

On June 7, 2017, Rep. Louie Gohmert of Texas's 1st congressional district commented on her conservative judicial philosophy: "There are only two reliable originalists on the Seventh Circuit, Michael Kanne and Diane Sykes."

In March 2025, Sykes wrote to President Donald Trump that she would take senior status, effective October 1.

== Notable cases ==
- In May 2015, the Supreme Court reversed a unanimous panel opinion Sykes joined which had found that Article Three of the United States Constitution forbids bankruptcy courts from creating jurisdiction over a claim through the litigants' consent. In Rubin v. Islamic Republic of Iran (2016), Sykes wrote for a unanimous court when it found that the Foreign Sovereign Immunities Act did not grant terrorist attack victims the right to attach a foreign state's property. That judgment was unanimously affirmed by the Supreme Court in February 2018.
- In April 2017, Sykes dissented when the en banc Seventh Circuit, by a vote of 8–3, found that LGBT Americans were protected from sex discrimination by Title VII of the Civil Rights Act of 1964. In her dissent, Sykes argued the court should have applied a "textualist decision method" instead of the majority's "sex stereotyping" reasoning or the "judicial interpretive updating" Judge Richard Posner promoted in his concurrence. In April 2018, Sykes wrote for a unanimous court when it found that the Americans with Disabilities Act did not require an employer to grant a multi-month leave of absence as a reasonable accommodation.
- In December 2017, Sykes supported the 4–3 en banc decision to reverse an earlier federal magistrate judgment that a confession had been unlawfully coerced from Brendan Dassey. The dissenting opinion described this decision as "a travesty of justice".
- In July 2018, Sykes wrote for a unanimous panel when it found that a new Illinois law that required previously convicted sex offenders to relocate their residences away from newly opened daycares did not violate the Constitution's Ex Post Facto Clause.

== Personal life ==
In 1980, she married Charlie Sykes, who went on to become a conservative talk-show host on WTMJ Radio in Milwaukee. The couple had two children and divorced in 1999.

Sykes is a member of the Federalist Society.

== Opinions ==
=== Wisconsin Supreme Court ===
- Baierl v. McTaggart, 245 Wis. 2d 632 (2001) – Dissent urging use of common law to overturn statutory rescission remedy in landlord-tenant law.
- Putnam v. Time Warner, 255 Wis.2d 447 (2002) – Dissenting in part, denying statutory action for wrongful charges on cable bill, using "voluntary payment doctrine."
- Bammert v. Don's Super Valu, 254 Wis. 2d 347 (2002) – Opinion of the Court refusing a cause of action for retaliation involving terminated wife of police officer who ticketed a drunk driver.
- State v. Carlson, 261 Wis.2d 97 (2003) – Dissent urging affirmation of verdict involving non-English speaking juror.
- Tietsworth v. Harley Davidson, 270 Wis.2d 146 (2004) – Opinion of the Court denying statutory cause of action under Wisconsin Deceptive Trade Practices Act, using "economic loss doctrine".
- State ex rel. Kalal v. Dane County Circuit Court, 271 Wis.2d 633 (2004) – Opinion of the Court outlining the originalist and textualist method of statutory interpretation and clarifying the role of deference to the legislature's policy determinations in judicial review.

=== U.S. Court of Appeals for the Seventh Circuit ===
- Christian Legal Society v. Walker 453 F.3d 853 (2006) – Opinion for the panel reversing the district court's denial of Christian Legal Society's motion for a temporary injunction.
- Chapman Kelley v. Chicago Park District, 635 F.3d 290 (2011) – Opinion for the panel holding that wildflower art is not copyrightable
- Ezell v. City of Chicago 651 F.3d 684 (2011) – Opinion for the panel holding that firing ranges are protected under the Second Amendment and granting preliminary injunction against Chicago's ban on firing ranges

=== Separate opinions ===
- Casey K. v. St. Anne Community High Sch. Dist. No. 302, 400 F.3d 508 (7th Cir. 2005) (dissent)
- United States v. O'Neill, 437 F.3d 654 (7th Cir. 2006) (dissent)
- In re United Airlines, 438 F.3d 720 (7th Cir. 2006) (concurring in part and dissenting in part)
- Johns v. Laidlaw Ed. Serv.,199 Fed. Appx. 568 (7th Cir. 2006) (dissent)
- Currie v. Paper Converting Machine Co., 202 Fed. Appx. 120 (7th Cir. 2006) (concurrence)
- Loubster v. Thacker, 440 F.3d 439 (7th Cir. 2006) (concurring in part and dissenting in part)
- Laskowski v. Spellings, 443 F.3d 930 (7th Cir. 2006) (dissent), vacated sub nom. Notre Dame v. Laskowski, 127 S. Ct. 3051 (2007)
- Winkler v. Gates, 481 F.3d 977 (7th Cir. 2007) (concurrence)
- IBEW v. Ill. Bell Telephone Co., 491 F.3d 685 (7th Cir. 2007) (dissent)
- Mainstreet Org. of Realtors v. Calumet City, 505 F.3d 742 (7th Cir. 2007) (concurrence)

== Publications ==
- Hallows Lecture: Reflections on the Wisconsin Supreme Court, 89 Marq. L. Rev. 723 (2006)
- "Of a Judiciary Nature": Observations on Chief Justice Roberts's First Opinions, 34 Pepp. L. Rev. 1027 (2007)
- Religious Liberties: The Role of Religion in Public Debate, 20 Regent U. L. Rev. 301 (2008) (introductory remarks)
- Citation to Unpublished Orders Under New FRAP Rule 32.1 and Circuit Rule 32.1: Early Experience in the Seventh Circuit, 32 S. Ill. U. L. J. 579 (2008)
- Independence versus Accountability: Finding a Balance Amidst the Changing Politics of State Court Judicial Selection, 92 Marq. L. Rev. 341 (2008)

== See also ==
- George W. Bush Supreme Court candidates
- Donald Trump Supreme Court candidates

Legal offices
Preceded by Donald W. Steinmetz	Justice of the Wisconsin Supreme Court; 1999–2004	Succeeded by Louis B. Butler
Preceded by John Louis Coffey	Judge of the United States Court of Appeals for the Seventh Circuit; 2004–2025	Succeeded by Rebecca Taibleson
Preceded by Diane Wood	Chief Judge of the United States Court of Appeals for the Seventh Circuit; 2020–2025	Succeeded by Michael B. Brennan
