= 2000 Wisconsin Supreme Court election =

- April 4, 2000
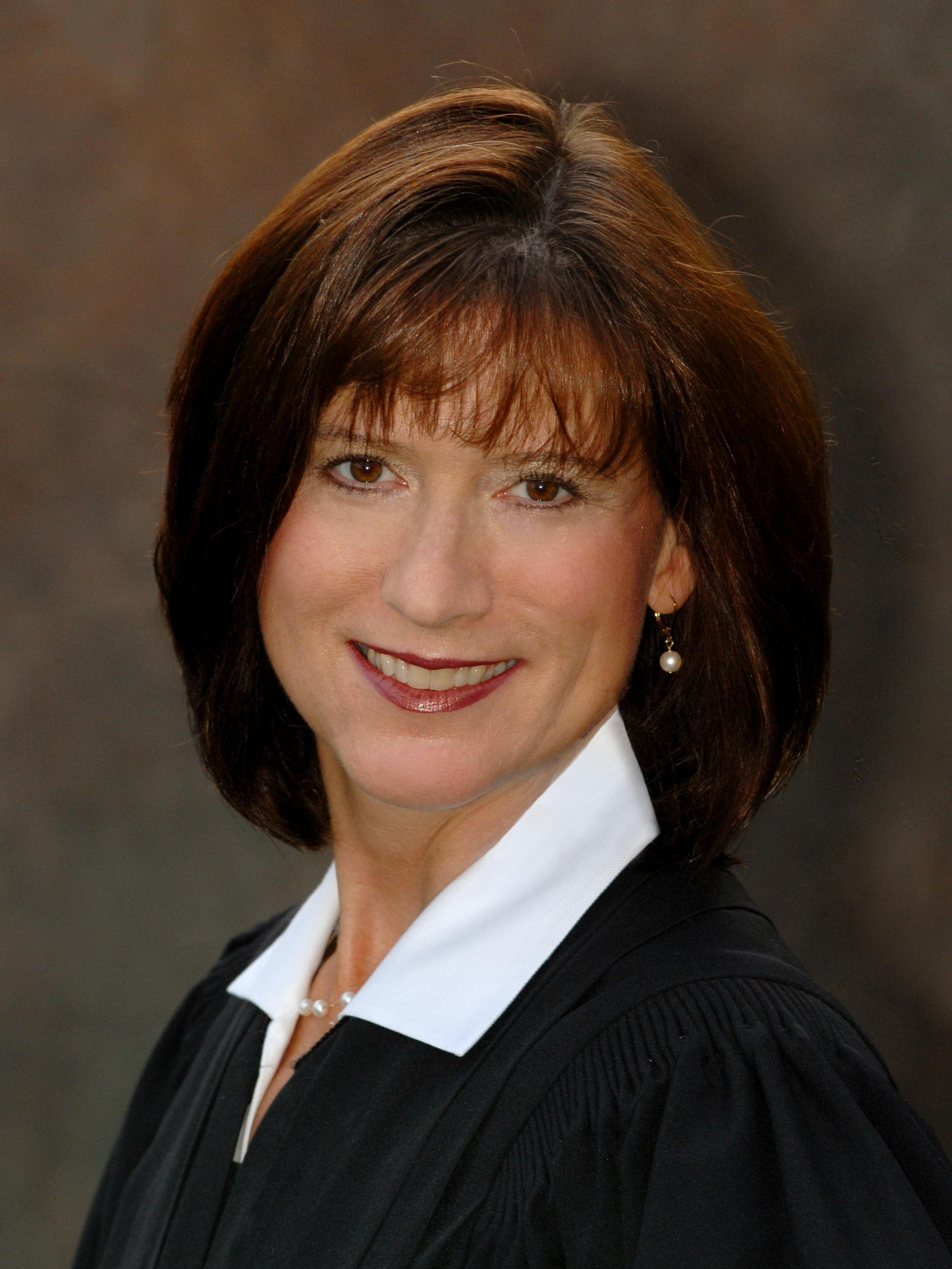

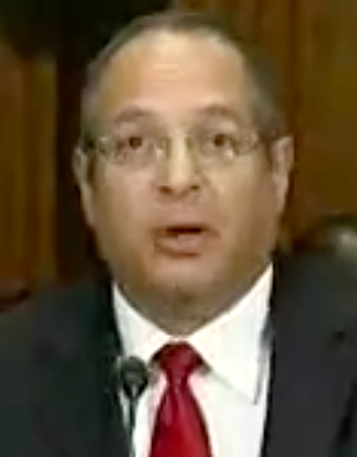
Candidate	Diane S. Sykes	Louis B. Butler
Popular vote	535,805	281,048
Percentage	65.52%	34.37%
- County results Sykes: 50–60% 60–70% 70–80%
Justice before election
Diane Sykes
Elected Justice
Diane Sykes

The 2000 Wisconsin Supreme Court election was held on April 4, 2000, to elect a justice to the Wisconsin Supreme Court for a ten-year term. Incumbent justice Diane S. Sykes (who had been appointed in 1999) was re-elected, defeating challenger Louis B. Butler by a wide margin.

== Background ==
In 1999, Justice Sykes was appointed to the court by Governor Tommy Thompson to replace Justice Donald W. Steinmetz, who had retired. Since Justice Steinmetz's term was already set to expire in 2000, the election did not need to be scheduled any earlier than it otherwise would have been.

== Results ==
2000 Wisconsin Supreme Court election
Party	Candidate	Votes	%
General election (April 4, 2000)
Nonpartisan	Diane S. Sykes (incumbent)	535,805	65.52%
Nonpartisan	Louis B. Butler	281,048	34.37%
	Scattering	895	0.11
Total votes		817,748	100

== See also ==
- 2000 Wisconsin elections
