= 2020 United States presidential election in Wisconsin =

- November 3, 2020
- Turnout: 72.94% (▲5.6 pp)

Nominee	Joe Biden	Donald Trump
Party	Democratic	Republican
Home state	Delaware	Florida
Running mate	Kamala Harris	Mike Pence
Electoral vote	10	0
Popular vote	1,630,866	1,610,184
Percentage	49.45%	48.82%

Biden
30–40%
40–50%
50–60%
60–70%
70–80%
80–90%
90–100%
Trump
30–40%
40–50%
50–60%
60–70%
70–80%
80–90%
90–100%
Tie/No Data
President before election
Donald Trump
Republican
Elected President
Joe Biden
Democratic

The 2020 United States presidential election in Wisconsin was held on Tuesday, November 3, 2020, as part of the 2020 United States presidential election in which all 50 states plus the District of Columbia participated. Wisconsin voters chose electors to represent them in the Electoral College via a popular vote, pitting the Republican Party's nominee, incumbent President Donald Trump, and running mate Vice President Mike Pence against Democratic Party nominee, former Vice President Joe Biden, and his running mate California Senator Kamala Harris. Wisconsin has 10 electoral votes in the Electoral College.

The 2020 Democratic National Convention was scheduled to be held at the Fiserv Forum in Milwaukee, but it was moved to the nearby Wisconsin Center due to the COVID-19 pandemic.

Polls of Wisconsin in the lead-up to election day showed a clear Biden lead, averaging in the high single digits. Prior to election day, most news organizations considered that the state was leaning towards Biden. Wisconsin was ultimately won by Biden by a narrow 0.63% margin over Trump, a far closer margin than expected and the closest margin since 2004. Trump had won the state in 2016 by 0.77% against Hillary Clinton and he would do so again in 2024 by 0.86% against Kamala Harris; however, Biden carried the state with a slightly larger margin than Al Gore did in 2000 by 0.22% or John Kerry did in 2004 by 0.38%, both times against George W. Bush. Once again, Trump significantly outperformed his polling average, which had Biden up 8.4 points in the state, but not enough to win the state. Trump held his own in counties in northern Wisconsin and in the WOW counties.

Biden won the highest vote share for a Democrat in Waukesha County, at 38.8%, since Jimmy Carter in 1976. Trump carried Brown County, which is Republican-leaning but competitive, though Biden won the city of Green Bay and improved on Clinton's margin in the county at large by about 3.7 points. Biden won back Sauk County, a county in the driftless region of southwestern Wisconsin; Biden also flipped Door County, which has voted for the winning candidate in each election since 1980, excluding both the 1992 and 2024 elections.

On November 18, Trump announced that he would request a recount in Milwaukee County and Dane County. On November 29, both counties re-affirmed Biden's victory, giving him a net gain of 87 votes over Trump.

With Ohio, Florida, and Iowa backing the losing candidate for the first time since 1960, 1992, and 2000 respectively, this election established Wisconsin, Michigan, and Pennsylvania as the states with the longest bellwether streak still in effect today. The last time any of them voted against the winning candidate was 2004, when all three voted for losing Democrat John Kerry.

Wisconsin voted 3.8% more Republican than the nation in general. This is the first time since 2004 that Wisconsin did not vote for the same candidate as neighboring Iowa.

== Primary elections ==
=== Effects of the COVID-19 pandemic ===
Since the outbreak of the COVID-19 pandemic, several states had delayed their scheduled primaries and extended the vote-by-mail period. Concerns were raised by health officials, poll workers, and voters that in-person voting at the height of the pandemic would be unsafe for vulnerable individuals. Democratic Governor Tony Evers initially signed an executive order for all-mail-in election, but the order was rejected by the Republican-controlled Wisconsin Legislature.

On April 2, although U.S. District Judge William M. Conley refused to postpone the election, he extended the deadline for absentee voting to April 13 (ordering clerks not to release any election data before that date). However, on April 6, the Supreme Court of the United States overturned Conley's decision, meaning that all absentee ballots still had to be postmarked by "election day, Tuesday, April 7" even though it was still acceptable for the ballots to be received by the clerks as late as April 13. The Supreme Court of the United States "did not alter the provision in Conley's amended order which prohibits the reporting of results until April 13".

Governor Evers then called a special session of the legislature to postpone in-person voting, but the session ended within minutes without action, forcing the primary to go on as planned. Despite having previously expressed the view that he would violate the law by doing so, on April 6, Evers issued an executive order which, if enforced, would have postponed the April 7 elections until the tentative date of June 9. Republican leaders immediately announced that they would challenge the order in the Wisconsin Supreme Court. The Wisconsin Supreme Court ruled that Evers did not have the authority to postpone the elections, thus meaning that Evers' executive order was nullified, and that the elections would be held as scheduled on April 7. This was appealed to a federal court who sided with the governor, and that was appealed to the US Supreme Court, which on a 5–4 vote, upheld the state court's ruling.

Voting was somewhat chaotic, with people waiting in the rain for hours in some cases in masks and social distancing. However, by the time the election concluded, Milwaukee Election Commissioner Neil Albrecht stated that despite some of the problems, the in-person voting ran smoothly.

=== Democratic primary ===
2020 Wisconsin Democratic presidential primary
Candidate	Votes	%	Delegates
Joe Biden	581,463	62.86	56
Bernie Sanders	293,441	31.72	28
Elizabeth Warren (withdrawn)	14,060	1.52	
Michael Bloomberg (withdrawn)	8,846	0.96	
Amy Klobuchar (withdrawn)	6,079	0.66	
Tulsi Gabbard (withdrawn)	5,565	0.60	
Pete Buttigieg (withdrawn)	4,946	0.53	
Andrew Yang (withdrawn)	3,349	0.36	
Tom Steyer (withdrawn)	836	0.09	
John Delaney (withdrawn)	529	0.06	
Michael Bennet (withdrawn)	475	0.05	
Deval Patrick (withdrawn)	311	0.03	
Write-in votes	1,575	0.17	
Uninstructed Delegate	3,590	0.39	
Total	925,065	100%	84

=== Republican primary ===
Incumbent President Donald Trump ran unopposed in the Republican primary, and thus received all of Wisconsin's 52 delegates to the 2020 Republican National Convention.

2020 Wisconsin Republican primary
Candidate	Votes	%	Delegates
Donald Trump	616,780	97.87%	52
Adam Nicholas Paul (write-in)	246	0.04%	
Uninstructed	11,246	1.78%	
Scattering	1,924	0.31%	
Total	630,196	100%	52

== General election ==
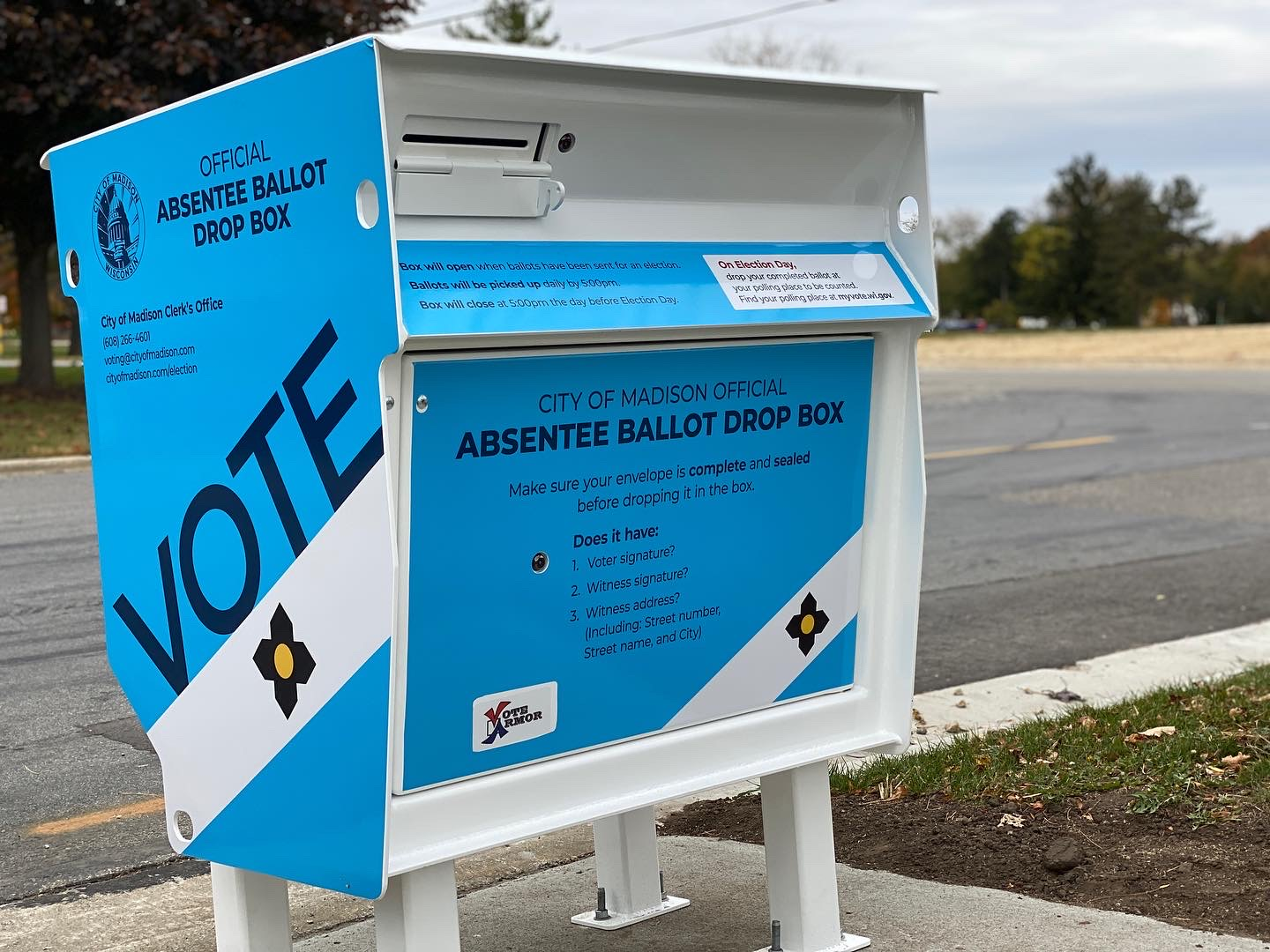
Absentee ballot drop box in Madison, Wisconsin

=== Final predictions ===
Source	Ranking
The Cook Political Report	Lean D (flip)
Inside Elections	Lean D (flip)
Sabato's Crystal Ball	Lean D (flip)
Politico	Lean D (flip)
RCP	Tossup
Niskanen	Likely D (flip)
CNN	Lean D (flip)
The Economist	Likely D (flip)
CBS News	Lean D (flip)
270towin	Lean D (flip)
ABC News	Lean D (flip)
NPR	Lean D (flip)
NBC News	Lean D (flip)
538	Likely D (flip)

=== Polling ===
==== Graphical summary ====
View source data.

==== Aggregate polls ====
Source of poll aggregation	Dates administered	Dates updated	Donald Trump Republican	Joe Biden Democratic	Other/ Undecided (Note: Calculated by taking the difference of 100% and all other candidates combined.)	Margin
270 to Win	November 1–2, 2020	November 3, 2020	42.8%	52.0%	5.2%	Biden +9.2
Real Clear Politics	October 21 – November 1, 2020	November 3, 2020	44.3%	51.0%	4.7%	Biden +6.7
FiveThirtyEight	until November 2, 2020	November 3, 2020	43.7%	52.1%	4.2%	Biden +8.4
Average			43.6%	51.7%	4.7%	Biden +8.1

==== 2020 polls ====
Poll source	Date(s) administered	Sample size (Note: Key: A – all adults RV – registered voters LV – likely voters V – unclear)	Margin of error	Donald Trump Republican	Joe Biden Democratic	Jo Jorgensen Libertarian	Howie Hawkins Green	Other	Undecided
SurveyMonkey/Axios	Oct 20 – Nov 2	2,814 (LV)	± 2.5%	44% (Note: Overlapping sample with the previous SurveyMonkey/Axios poll, but more information available regarding sample size)	54%	-	-	–	–
Research Co.	Oct 31 – Nov 1	450 (LV)	± 4.6%	45%	54%	-	-	1% (Note: "Someone else" with 1%)	7%
Change Research/CNBC	Oct 29 – Nov 1	553 (LV)	± 4.17%	45%	53%	2%	-	–	0%
Civiqs/Daily Kos	Oct 29 – Nov 1	789 (LV)	± 3.6%	47%	51%	-	-	1%	0%
Swayable	Oct 27 – Nov 1	253 (LV)	± 8.2%	45%	55%	1%	-	–	–
Ipsos/Reuters	Oct 27 – Nov 1	696 (LV)	± 4.2%	43% (Note: Standard VI response)	53%	2%	0%	2% (Note: "Some other candidate" with 2%; West (B) and would not vote with 0%)	–
Ipsos/Reuters	Oct 27 – Nov 1	696 (LV)	± 4.2%	43% (Note: If only Biden, Trump and "some other candidate" were available)	53%	-	-	2% (Note: "Some other candidate" with 2%; would not vote with 0%)	2%
Ipsos/Reuters	Oct 27 – Nov 1	696 (LV)	± 4.2%	45% (Note: Results considering those who lean towards a given candidate among those initially predisposed towards abstention, indecision or a candidate besides Biden or Trump in the response section immediately above)	53%	-	-	2% (Note: "Some other candidate" with 2%)	–
AtlasIntel	Oct 30–31	781 (LV)	± 3%	49%	51%	-	-	–	1%
Susquehanna/Center for American Greatness (Note: The Center for American Greatness is a pro-Trump organization)	Oct 29–31	450 (LV)	± 4.6%	46%	49%	-	-	2% (Note: "Other" and "Refused/would not vote" with 1%)	1%
Morning Consult	Oct 22–31	1,002 (LV)	± 3%	41%	54%	-	-	–	–
Emerson College	Oct 29–30	751 (LV)	± 3.1%	45% (Note: With voters who lean towards a given candidate)	52%	-	-	2% (Note: "Someone else" with 2%)	–
AtlasIntel	Oct 29–30	672 (LV)	± 4%	50%	49%	-	-	2%	–
CNN/SSRS	Oct 29–30	873 (LV)	± 3.9%	44%	52%	3%	-	0% (Note: "None of these" and "Other" with 0%)	2%
Siena College/NYT Upshot	Oct 26–30	1,253 (LV)	± 3.2%	41%	52%	2%	-	1% (Note: "Someone else" with 1%; would not vote with 0%)	4% (Note: Includes "Refused")
Redfield & Wilton	Oct 26–29	800 (LV)	–	41%	53%	2%	-	1%	2%
SurveyMonkey/Axios	Oct 1–28	4,569 (LV)	± 2.0%	43%	55%	-	-	–	–
Swayable	Oct 23–26	313 (LV)	± 7.2%	45%	54%	1%	-	–	–
Ipsos/Reuters	Oct 20–26	664 (LV)	± 4.3%	44%	53%	2%	1%	3% (Note: "Some other candidate" with 1%; West (B) and would not vote with 0%)	–
Ipsos/Reuters	Oct 20–26	664 (LV)	± 4.3%	44%	53%	-	-	2%	2%
Trafalgar Group	Oct 24–25	1,082 (LV)	± 2.89%	47%	47%	3%	-	1%	1%
Marquette Law School	Oct 21–25	749 (LV)	± 4.4%	43%	48%	2%	-	7% (Note: "Refused" with 6%; "None/other" with 1%; Did not vote with 0%)	0%
ABC/Washington Post	Oct 20–25	809 (LV)	± 4%	40%	57%	2%	-	1% (Note: "None of these" with 1%; "Other" with 0%; would not vote with no voters)	1%
Gravis Marketing	Oct 23	677 (LV)	± 3.8%	43%	54%	-	-	–	3%
YouGov/UW–Madison	Oct 13–21	647 (LV)	± 4.07%	44%	53%	-	-	3% (Note: Includes Undecided)	–
Fox News	Oct 17–20	1,037 (LV)	± 3%	44%	49%	2%	-	1% (Note: "Other" with 1%; would not vote with no voters)	4%
RMG Research/PoliticalIQ	Oct 14–20	800 (LV)	± 3.5%	44%	50%	-	-	3% (Note: "Some other candidate" with 3%)	4%
RMG Research/PoliticalIQ	Oct 14–20	800 (LV)	± 3.5%	42% (Note: Results generated with high Democratic turnout model)	52%	-	-	3%	4%
RMG Research/PoliticalIQ	Oct 14–20	800 (LV)	± 3.5%	45% (Note: Results generated with high Republican turnout model)	48%	-	-	3%	4%
Morning Consult	Oct 11–20	1,038 (LV)	± 3%	42%	54%	-	-	–	–
Susquehanna/Center for American Greatness	Oct 16–19	500 (LV)	± 4.3%	45%	45%	5%	-	3% (Note: "Refused" with 2%; "Other" with 1%)	3%
Change Research/CNBC	Oct 16–19	447 (LV) (Note: Additional data sourced from FiveThirtyEight)	–	44%	52%	-	-	–	–
Latino Decisions/DFER (Note: This poll's sponsor, DFER, primarily supports Democratic candidates)	Oct 14–19	400 (LV)	± 5%	45%	50%	-	-	–	4%
Ipsos/Reuters	Oct 13–19	663 (LV)	± 4.3%	45%	51%	2%	0%	3% (Note: "Some other candidate" with 2%; West (B) with 1%; would not vote with 0%)	–
Ipsos/Reuters	Oct 13–19	663 (LV)	± 4.3%	43%	51%	-	-	3% (Note: "Some other candidate" with 3%; would not vote with 0%)	3%
Trafalgar Group	Oct 14–16	1,051 (LV)	± 2.94%	46%	48%	2%	-	1%	3%
YouGov/CBS	Oct 13–16	1,112 (LV)	± 3.5%	45%	50%	-	-	3% (Note: "Someone else/third party" with 3%)	2%
Trafalgar Group/Restoration PAC (Note: The Restoration PAC is a 501 non-profit which supports Donald Trump's 2020 presidential campaign)	Oct 11–13	1,043 (LV)	± 2.95%	45%	47%	3%	–	2%	3%
Redfield & Wilton	Oct 10–13	691 (LV)	–	40%	53%	2%	0%	–	–
David Binder Research/Focus on Rural America	Oct 10–13	200 (LV)	–	43%	53%	-	-	–	–
Civiqs/Rust Belt Rising (Note: Rust Belt Rising is affiliated with the Democratic Party)	Oct 8–11	560 (LV)	± 4.4%	45%	53%	-	-	2%	1%
Siena College/NYT Upshot	Oct 8–11	789 (LV)	± 4%	41%	51%	3%	-	0% (Note: "Someone else" and would not vote with 0%)	5%
Ipsos/Reuters	Oct 6–11	577 (LV)	± 4.7%	45%	51%	2%	0%	1%	–
Ipsos/Reuters	Oct 6–11	577 (LV)	± 4.7%	44%	51%	-	-	3%	2%
Morning Consult	Oct 2–11	1,067 (LV)	± 3%	44%	51%	-	-	–	–
Redfield & Wilton	Oct 9–10	613 (LV)	–	45%	49%	2%	-	–	–
Baldwin Wallace University	Sep 30 – Oct 8	883 (LV)	± 3.4%	43%	49%	2%	0%	1% (Note: "Another candidate" with 1%)	6%
Redfield & Wilton	Oct 4–7	688 (LV)	± 3.74%	41%	51%	1%	-	1% (Note: "Another Third Party/Write-in" with 1%)	6%
Ipsos/Reuters	Sep 29 – Oct 5	601 (LV)	± 4.6%	44%	50%	-	-	2%	4%
Change Research/CNBC	Oct 2–4	442 (LV)	–	44%	51%	-	-	–	–
Marquette Law School	Sep 30 – Oct 4	805 (RV)	–	41%	46%	5%	-	7% (Note: "None/other" with 2%; "refused" with 5%)	2%
Marquette Law School	Sep 30 – Oct 4	700 (LV)	–	42%	47%	4%	-	2% (Note: "None/other" and "refused" with 1%)	1%
SurveyMonkey/Axios	Sep 1–30	3,806 (LV)	–	44%	53%	-	-	–	2%
Trafalgar Group/Restoration PAC	Sep 25–28	1,084 (LV)	± 2.89%	44%	47%	3%	-	2% (Note: "Another Party Candidate" with 2%)	3%
Redfield & Wilton	Sep 23–27	663 (LV)	± 3.81%	43%	48%	2%	-	0% (Note: "Another Third Party/Write-in" with 0%)	7%
Susquehanna/Center for American Greatness	Sep 23–26	500 (LV)	± 4.3%	46%	48%	-	-	–	–
Trafalgar Group (R)	Sep 22–24	1,189 (LV)	± 2.76%	45%	48%	3%	-	2%	3%
Marist College/NBC	Sep 20–24	727 (LV)	± 4.6%	44%	54%	-	-	1%	1%
Baldwin Wallace University	Sep 9–22	863 (LV)	± 3.7%	41%	50%	2%	0%	1%	6%
YouGov/UW-Madison Elections Research; Center/Wisconsin State Journal	Sep 10–21	664 (LV)	–	46%	50%	-	-	–	–
Change Research/CNBC	Sep 18–20	571 (LV)	–	42%	51%	-	-	–	–
Hart Research Associates/Human Rights Campaign (Note: The Human Rights Campaign endorsed Biden prior to this poll's sampling period)	Sep 17–19	400 (LV)	± 4.9%	44%	51%	-	-	–	–
Redfield & Wilton	Sep 12–16	636 (LV)	± 3.89%	41%	47%	1%	1%	1%	10%
Ipsos/Reuters	Sep 11–16	609 (LV)	–	43%	48%	-	-	2%	6%
Morning Consult	Sep 7–16	800 (LV)	± 3.5%	42% (Note: Overlapping sample with the previous Morning Consult poll, but more information available regarding sampling period)	51%	-	-	–	–
Civiqs/Rust Belt Rising	Sep 11–15	549 (RV)	± 3.9%	44%	51%	-	-	2%	2%
Morning Consult	Sep 6–15	800 (LV)	± 3.5%	42%	51%	-	-	–	–
CNN/SSRS	Sep 9–13	816 (LV)	± 4.2%	42%	52%	3%	-	1% (Note: "None of these" with 1%; "Other" with 0%)	1%
ABC/Washington Post	Sep 8–13	605 (LV)	± 4.5%	46%	52%	-	-	1% (Note: "Neither" with 1%; "Other" and would not vote with 0%)	1%
Siena College/NYT Upshot	Sep 8–10	760 (LV)	± 4.7%	43%	48%	2%	0%	2% (Note: "Someone else" and would not vote with 1%)	6%
Emerson College	Sep 6–8	823 (LV)	± 3.4%	45%	52%	-	-	4% (Note: "Someone else" with 4%)	–
Benenson Strategy Group/GS Group/AARP	Aug 28 – Sep 8	1,200 (LV)	± 2.8%	45%	50%	-	-	1% (Note: Would not vote with 1%)	4%
Change Research/CNBC	Sep 4–6	501 (LV)	–	44%	50%	-	-	6% (Note: "Other/not sure" with 6%)	–
Morning Consult	Aug 27 – Sep 5	763 (LV)	± 3.5%	44%	50%	-	-	–	–
YouGov/CBS	Sep 2–4	978 (LV)	± 3.7%	44%	50%	-	-	2% (Note: "Someone else/third party" with 2%)	4%
Redfield & Wilton	Aug 30 – Sep 4	670 (LV)	± 3.78%	41%	50%	2%	0%	0%	6%
Marquette Law School	Aug 30 – Sep 3	688 (LV)	–	44%	48%	4%	-	2% (Note: "Refused" with 2%; "None/other" with 0%)	2%
Pulse/Rasmussen Reports	Sep 1–2	1,000 (LV)	± 3%	43%	51%	-	-	3% (Note: "Someone else" with 3%)	2%
Fox News	Aug 29 – Sep 1	801 (LV)	± 3.5%	42%	50%	2%	–	1% (Note: "Other" with 1%)	5%
Fox News	Aug 29 – Sep 1	853 (RV)	± 3%	41%	49%	2%	–	2% (Note: "Other" and would not vote with 1%)	5%
SurveyMonkey/Axios	Aug 1–31	1,913 (LV)	–	49%	48%	-	-	–	2%
Opinium/The Guardian	Aug 21–28	700 (LV)	–	40%	53%	-	-	1%	5%
Morning Consult	Aug 17–26	797 (LV)	± 3.5%	42%	52%	-	-	–	–
Change Research/CNBC	Aug 21–23	925 (LV)	–	44%	49%	-	-	–	–
Trafalgar Group	Aug 14–23	1,011 (LV)	± 2.99%	46%	45%	4%	-	2% (Note: "Another Party Candidate")	3%
Hodas & Associates/Restoration PAC	Aug 17–20	600 (LV)	–	44%	52%	-	-	–	4%
Redfield & Wilton	Aug 13–17	672 (LV)	± 3.9%	40%	49%	1%	1%	2% (Note: "Another Third Party/Write-in" and West (B) with 1%)	7%
Civiqs/Rust Belt Rising	Aug 13–17	753 (RV)	–	45%	51%	-	-	2%	2%
Morning Consult	Aug 7–16	788 (LV)	± 3.5%	43% (Note: Overlapping sample with the previous Morning Consult poll, but more information available regarding third party and undecided voters)	49%	-	-	2%	5%
Morning Consult	Aug 4–13	797 (LV)	± 3.5%	43%	50%	-	-	–	–
Change Research/CNBC	Aug 6–9	384 (LV)	–	43%	47%	-	-	–	–
Marquette Law School	Aug 4–9	694 (LV)	± 3.8%	46%	50%	-	-	3% (Note: "Neither" with 2%; "refused" with 1%)	1%
YouGov/CBS	Aug 4–7	994 (LV)	± 3.8%	42%	48%	-	-	3%	7%
Pulse/Rasmussen Reports/American Greatness PAC	Aug 5–6	750 (LV)	–	43%	55%	-	-	1%	1%
YouGov/UW–Madison	Jul 27 – Aug 6	734 (RV)	± 4.9%	43%	49%	-	-	4% (Note: "Other" with 3%; would not vote with 1%)	4%
OnMessage/Heritage Action (Note: Heritage Action is the sister organization of the Heritage Foundation, which exclusively endorses Republican candidates)	Aug 2–4	400 (LV)	± 4.7%	47%	47%	-	-	–	6%
Morning Consult	Jul 25 – Aug 3	797 (LV)	± 3.5%	41%	51%	-	-	–	–
David Binder Research	Jul 30–31	200 (LV)	–	42%	53%	-	-	–	–
SurveyMonkey/Axios	Jul 1–31	2,173 (LV)	–	48%	50%	-	-	–	2%
Hodas & Associates/Restoration PAC	Jul 22–27	600 (LV)	–	38%	52%	-	-	–	10%
Change Research/CNBC	Jul 24–26	392 (LV)	–	43%	48%	-	-	–	–
Redfield & Wilton	Jul 19–24	742 (LV)	–	35%	45%	2%	0%	3% (Note: West (B) with 2%; "Another Third Party/Write-In" 1%)	15%
Morning Consult	Jul 15–24	797 (LV)	± 3.5%	44%	49%	-	-	–	–
Gravis Marketing	Jul 22	796 (RV)	± 3.5%	42%	50%	-	-	–	7%
Global Strategy Group (D)	Jul 11–17	600 (V)	± 4.0%	42%	51%	-	-	2% (Note: "Other candidate" with 2%)	4%
Spry Strategies/American Principles Project (Note: This poll's sponsor is the American Principles Project, a 501(c)(4) organization that supports the Republican Party.)	Jul 11–16	700 (LV)	± 3.7%	45%	46%	-	-	–	8%
Morning Consult	Jul 5–14	797 (LV)	± 3.5%	41%	50%	-	-	–	–
Change Research/CNBC	Jul 10–12	601 (LV)	–	42%	48%	-	-	–	–
Morning Consult	Jun 25 – Jul 4	797 (LV)	± 3.5%	44%	50%	-	-	–	–
SurveyMonkey/Axios	Jun 8–30	813 (LV)	–	47%	51%	-	-	–	2%
Change Research/CNBC	Jun 26–28	502 (LV)	–	43%	51%	-	-	–	–
Trafalgar Group	Jun 25–26	1,021 (LV)	± 3.0%	46%	45%	-	-	8% (Note: "Other party candidate" with 8%)	2%
Ogden & Fry	Jun 20–24	825 (LV)	± 3.48%	44%	45%	-	-	–	10%
Morning Consult	Jun 15–24	797 (LV)	± 3.5%	44%	50%	-	-	–	–
Redfield & Wilton	Jun 14–19	846 (LV)	± 3.37%	36%	45%	1%	1%	2% (Note: "Other" with 2%)	15%
Marquette Law School	Jun 14–18	686 (LV)	–	44%	52%	-	-	3%	1%
Hodas & Associates/Restoration PAC (R)	Jun 12–16	600 (LV)	± 4.0%	39%	55%	-	-	–	6%
NYT Upshot/Siena College	Jun 8–15	655 (RV)	± 4.3%	38%	49%	-	-	5% (Note: "Another candidate" with 3%; would not vote with 2%)	8%
Morning Consult	Jun 5–14	797 (LV)	± 3.5%	44%	49%	-	-	–	–
Change Research/CNBC	Jun 12–14	231 (LV)	–	44%	48%	-	-	5% (Note: "Libertarian Party candidate/Green Party candidate" with 5%)	–
Morning Consult	May 26 – Jun 4	797 (LV)	± 3.5%	44%	48%	-	-	–	–
Fox News	May 30 – Jun 2	801 (RV)	± 3.5%	40%	49%	-	-	6% (Note: "Other" with 4%; would not vote with 2%)	5%
Change Research/CNBC	May 29–31	382 (LV)	–	45%	45%	-	-	5%	6%
Morning Consult	May 16–25	797 (LV)	± 3.5%	44%	48%	-	-	–	–
Morning Consult	May 6–15	797 (LV)	± 3.5%	42%	49%	-	-	–	–
Redfield & Wilton	May 10–14	875 (LV)	± 3.3%	38%	48%	-	-	3% (Note: "Third party/write-in" with 3%)	10%
Hodas & Associates/Restoration PAC (R)	May 6–8	600 (LV)	± 3%	42%	51%	-	-	–	8%
Marquette Law School	May 3–7	650 (LV)	–	45%	49%	-	-	4% (Note: "Neither" with 3%; "Refused" with 1%)	2%
Morning Consult	Apr 26 – May 5	797 (LV)	± 3.5%	43%	49%	-	-	–	–
Public Policy Polling (Note: Poll sponsored by Protect Our Care, a pro-Affordable Care Act organization)	Apr 20–21	1,415 (RV)	–	45%	50%	-	-	–	4%
Ipsos	Apr 15–20	645 (RV)	± 5.0%	40%	43%	-	-	–	–
Hodas & Associates/Restoration PAC (R)	Apr 13–15	600 (RV)	± 3.0%	45%	50%	-	-	–	4%
Hart Research/CAP Action (Note: CAP Action is a political advocacy group that exclusively supports Democratic candidates)	Apr 6–8	303 (RV)	–	47%	48%	-	-	2%	3%
Marquette Law School	Mar 24–29	813 (RV)	–	45%	48%	-	-	4%	3%
BW Great Lakes	Mar 17–25	822 (RV)	± 3.8%	45%	45%	-	-	–	10%
Change Research	Mar 21–23	510 (LV)	–	49%	45%	-	–	6%	
Hodas & Associates/Restoration PAC (R)	Mar 17–19	600 (RV)	–	49%	45%	-	-	–	–
Public Policy Polling	Mar 10–11	1,727 (RV)	–	45%	48%	-	-	–	6%
YouGov/Yahoo News	Mar 6–8	459 (RV)	–	42%	44%	-	-	6% (Note: "Other" with 5%; would not vote with 1%)	7%
Firehouse Strategies/Øptimus	Mar 5–7	502 (LV)	± 4.7%	45%	43%	-	-	–	–
Marquette Law School	Feb 19–23	1,000 (RV)	–	46%	46%	-	-	5% (Note: "Neither" with 4%; "Refused" with 0%)	3%
YouGov	Feb 11–20	936 (RV)	± 4.0%	43%	45%	-	-	–	–
Quinnipiac	Feb 12–18	823 (RV)	± 3.4%	49%	42%	-	-	4% (Note: "Someone else" with 1%; would not vote with 3%)	4%
Expedition Strategies/Progressive Policy Institute	Feb 6–18	500 (RV)	–	44%	42%	-	-	–	13%
Tarrance Group/WMC	Jan 14–16	500 (LV)	± 4.5%	46%	47%	-	-	–	6%
Marquette Law School	Jan 8–12	701 (LV)	–	47%	48%	-	-	4%	2%
Fox News	Jan 5–8	1,504 (RV)	± 2.5%	41%	46%	-	-	8% (Note: "Other" with 6%; would not vote with 2%)	4%

==== 2019 polls ====
Poll source	Date(s) administered	Sample size	Margin of error	Donald Trump Republican	Joe Biden Democratic	Other	Undecided
Marquette Law School	Dec 3–8	652 (LV)	–	47%	49%	2% (Note: "Neither" with 1%; "refused" with 1%)	1%
Firehouse Strategies/Øptimus	Dec 3–5	610 (LV)	± 4.1%	48%	39%	8% (Note: A third party candidate with 6%; would not vote with 2%)	5%
Marquette Law School	Nov 13–17	685 (LV)	–	48%	45%	5% (Note: "Neither" with 4%; "refused" with 1%)	2%
NYT Upshot/Siena College	Oct 13–26	651 (LV)	± 4.4%	44%	46%	–	–
Marquette Law School	Oct 13–17	657 (LV)	–	44%	51%	3% (Note: "Neither" with 3%; "refused" with 0%)	1%
Fox News	Sep 29 – Oct 2	1,512 (RV)	± 2.5%	39%	48%	5%	6%
Firehouse Strategies/Øptimus	Sep 7–9	534 (LV)	± 4.0%	42%	44%	14%	–
Marquette Law School	Aug 25–29	672 (LV)	–	44%	51%	3%	2%
Firehouse Strategies/Øptimus	Jun 11–13	535 (LV)	± 4.3%	40%	46%	14%	–
WPA Intelligence	Apr 27–30	200 (LV)	± 6.9%	46%	42%	–	9%
Zogby Analytics	Apr 15–18	802 (LV)	± 3.5%	40%	50%	–	11%
Firehouse Strategies/Øptimus	Mar 19–21	616 (LV)	± 4.1%	40%	53%	5%	–
Emerson College	Mar 15–17	775 (RV)	± 3.5%	46%	54%	–	–

==== Former candidates and hypothetical polling ====
Former candidates

Donald Trump vs. Michael Bloomberg

Poll source	Date(s) administered	Sample size	Margin of error	Donald Trump (R)	Michael Bloomberg (D)	Other	Undecided
Marquette Law School	Feb 19–23, 2020	1,000 (RV)	–	45%	44%	5% (Note: "Neither" with 5%; "refused" with 1%)	5%
Quinnipiac University	Feb 12–18, 2020	823 (RV)	± 3.4%	49%	41%	5% (Note: "Someone else" with 2%; would not vote with 3%)	5%
Expedition Strategies/Progressive Policies Institute	Feb 6–18, 2020	500 (RV)	–	44%	43%	–	12%
Firehouse Strategies/Øptimus	Dec 3–5, 2019	610 (LV)	± 4.1%	49%	37%	10% (Note: A third party candidate with 8%; would not vote with 2%)	4%

Donald Trump vs. Cory Booker

Poll source	Date(s) administered	Sample size	Margin of error	Donald Trump (R)	Cory Booker (D)	Other	Undecided
Marquette Law School	Dec 3–8, 2019	652 (LV)	–	47%	45%	4%	4%
Marquette Law School	Nov 13–17, 2019	685 (LV)	–	45%	45%	5% (Note: "Neither" with 3%; "refused" with 2%)	4%

Donald Trump vs. Pete Buttigieg

Poll source	Date(s) administered	Sample size	Margin of error	Donald Trump (R)	Pete Buttigieg (D)	Other	Undecided
Marquette Law School	Feb 19–23, 2020	1,000 (RV)	–	45%	45%	5%	5%
YouGov	Feb 11–20, 2020	936 (RV)	± 4.0%	43%	45%	–	–
Quinnipiac University	Feb 12–18, 2020	823 (RV)	± 3.4%	49%	41%	5% (Note: "Someone else" with 1%; would not vote with 4%)	5%
Expedition Strategies/Progressive Policies Institute	Feb 6–18, 2020	500 (RV)	–	43%	44%	–	13%
Marquette Law School	Jan 8–12, 2020	701 (LV)	–	47%	45%	5%	4%
Fox News	Jan 5–8, 2020	1,504 (RV)	± 2.5%	41%	42%	10 (Note: "Other" with 7%; would not vote with 3%)	7%
Marquette Law School	Dec 3–8, 2019	652 (LV)	–	47%	44%	4% (Note: "Neither" with 2%; "refused" with 2%)	4%
Firehouse Strategies/Øptimus	Dec 3–5, 2019	610 (LV)	± 4.1%	49%	38%	8%	5%
Marquette Law School	Nov 13–17, 2019	685 (LV)	–	48%	40%	7% (Note: "Neither" with 5%; "refused" with 2%)	6%
Marquette Law School	Oct 13–17, 2019	657 (LV)	–	44%	46%	5% (Note: "Neither" with 5%; "refused" with 0%)	4%
Firehouse Strategies/Øptimus	Jun 11–13, 2019	535 (LV)	± 4.3%	41%	39%	20%	–
Zogby Analytics	Apr 15–18, 2019	802 (LV)	± 3.5%	41%	44%	–	16%

Donald Trump vs. Kamala Harris

Poll source	Date(s) administered	Sample size	Margin of error	Donald Trump (R)	Kamala Harris (D)	Other	Undecided
Marquette Law School	Aug 25–29, 2019	672 (LV)	–	46%	46%	5%	4%
Zogby Analytics	Apr 15–18, 2019	802 (LV)	± 3.5%	42%	43%	–	14%
Emerson College	Mar 15–17, 2019	775 (RV)	± 3.5%	50%	50%	–	–

Donald Trump vs. Amy Klobuchar

Poll source	Date(s) administered	Sample size	Margin of error	Donald Trump (R)	Amy Klobuchar (D)	Other	Undecided
Marquette Law School	Feb 19–23, 2020	1,000 (RV)	–	46%	46%	4%	4%
YouGov	Feb 11–20, 2020	936 (RV)	± 4.0%	43%	44%	–	–
Quinnipiac University	Feb 12–18, 2020	823 (RV)	± 3.4%	50%	39%	5%	6%
Marquette Law School	Nov 13–17, 2019	685 (LV)	–	53%	36%	6%	4%
Emerson College	Mar 15–17, 2019	775 (RV)	± 3.5%	50%	50%	–	–

Donald Trump vs. Beto O'Rourke

Poll source	Date(s) administered	Sample size	Margin of error	Donald Trump (R)	Beto O'Rourke (D)	Other	Undecided
Zogby Analytics	Apr 15–18, 2019	802 (LV)	± 3.5%	41%	44%	–	15%
Firehouse Strategies/Øptimus	Mar 19–21, 2019	616 (LV)	± 4.1%	42%	45%	9%	–
Emerson College	Mar 15–17, 2019	775 (RV)	± 3.5%	49%	51%	–	–

Donald Trump vs. Bernie Sanders

Poll source	Date(s) administered	Sample size	Margin of error	Donald Trump (R)	Bernie Sanders (D)	Other	Undecided
Marquette Law School	Mar 24–29, 2020	813 (RV)	–	47%	45%	6%	2%
Baldwin Wallace University Great Lakes	Mar 17–25, 2020	822 (RV)	± 3.8%	46%	42%	–	12%
Hodas & Associates/Hodas & Associates/Restoration PAC (R)	Mar 17–19, 2020	600 (RV)	–	50%	43%	–	–
Public Policy Polling	Mar 10–11, 2020	1,727 (V)	–	46%	48%	–	7%
YouGov/Yahoo News	Mar 6–8, 2020	459 (RV)	–	40%	46%	9% (Note: "Other" with 7%; would not vote with 2%)	5%
Firehouse Strategies/Øptimus	Mar 5–7, 2020	502 (LV)	± 4.7%	48%	42%	–	–
Marquette Law School	Feb 19–23, 2020	1,000 (RV)	–	46%	48%	3%	3%
YouGov	Feb 11–20, 2020	936 (RV)	± 4.0%	44%	46%	–	–
Quinnipiac University	Feb 12–18, 2020	823 (RV)	± 3.4%	50%	43%	4%	4%
Expedition Strategies/Progressive Policies Institute	Feb 6–18, 2020	500 (RV)	–	46%	45%	–	9%
Tarrance Group/Wisconsin Manufacturers & Commerce	Jan 14–16, 2020	500 (LV)	± 4.5%	47%	47%	–	7%
Marquette Law School	Jan 8–12, 2020	701 (LV)	–	47%	47%	3%	1%
Fox News	Jan 5–8, 2020	1,504 (RV)	± 2.5%	42%	46%	8%	4%
Marquette Law School	Dec 3–8, 2019	652 (LV)	–	48%	46%	4%	1%
Firehouse Strategies/Øptimus	Dec 3–5, 2019	610 (LV)	± 4.1%	51%	38%	7%	4%
Marquette Law School	Nov 13–17, 2019	685 (LV)	–	49%	45%	5%	1%
NYT Upshot/Siena College	Oct 13–26, 2019	651 (LV)	± 4.4%	46%	47%	–	–
Marquette Law School	Oct 13–17, 2019	657 (LV)	–	45%	48%	4%	2%
Fox News	Sep 29 – Oct 2, 2019	1,512 (RV)	± 2.5%	40%	45%	5%	6%
Firehouse Strategies/Øptimus	Sep 7–9, 2019	534 (LV)	± 4.0%	43%	49%	8%	–
Marquette Law School	Aug 25–29, 2019	672 (LV)	–	46%	48%	4%	1%
Firehouse Strategies/Øptimus	Jun 11–13, 2019	535 (LV)	± 4.3%	40%	47%	13%	–
Zogby Analytics	Apr 15–18, 2019	802 (LV)	± 3.5%	42%	49%	–	9%
Tulchin Research (D) (Note: Poll sponsored by the Sanders campaign)	Apr 14–18, 2019	400 (LV)	± 4.9%	42%	52%	–	–
Firehouse Strategies/Øptimus	Mar 19–21, 2019	616 (LV)	± 4.1%	41%	48%	7%	–
Emerson College	Mar 15–17, 2019	775 (RV)	± 3.5%	48%	52%	–	–

Donald Trump vs. Elizabeth Warren

Poll source	Date(s) administered	Sample size	Margin of error	Donald Trump (R)	Elizabeth Warren (D)	Other	Undecided
Marquette Law School	Feb 19–23, 2020	1,000 (RV)	–	47%	44%	4%	4%
YouGov	Feb 11–20, 2020	936 (RV)	± 4.0%	44%	46%	–	–
Quinnipiac University	Feb 12–18, 2020	823 (RV)	± 3.4%	51%	41%	4%	4%
Marquette Law School	Jan 8–12, 2020	701 (LV)	–	49%	45%	5%	2%
Fox News	Jan 5–8, 2020	1,504 (RV)	± 2.5%	41%	44%	9% (Note: "Other" with 6%; would not vote with 3%)	5%
Marquette Law School	Dec 3–8, 2019	652 (LV)	–	48%	46%	5%	2%
Firehouse Strategies/Øptimus	Dec 3–5, 2019	610 (LV)	± 4.1%	50%	37%	8%	5%
Marquette Law School	Nov 13–17, 2019	685 (LV)	–	50%	43%	4%	2%
NYT Upshot/Siena College	Oct 13–26, 2019	651 (LV)	± 4.4%	47%	45%	–	–
Marquette Law School	Oct 13–17, 2019	657 (LV)	–	45%	50%	3%	1%
Fox News	Sep 29 – Oct 2, 2019	1,512 (RV)	± 2.5%	41%	45%	5%	7%
Firehouse Strategies/Øptimus	Sep 7–9, 2019	534 (LV)	± 4.0%	42%	43%	15%	–
Marquette Law School	Aug 25–29, 2019	672 (LV)	–	46%	48%	4%	3%
Firehouse Strategies/Øptimus	Jun 11–13, 2019	535 (LV)	± 4.3%	41%	41%	18%	–
Zogby Analytics	Apr 15–18, 2019	802 (LV)	± 3.5%	41%	47%	–	12%
Emerson College	Mar 15–17, 2019	775 (RV)	± 3.5%	48%	52%	–	–
Zogby Analytics	Aug 17–23, 2017	603 (LV)	± 4.0%	37%	48%	–	15%

Hypothetical polling

with Donald Trump, Joe Biden, and Howard Schultz

Poll source	Date(s) administered	Sample size	Margin of error	Donald Trump (R)	Joe Biden (D)	Howard Schultz (I)	Undecided
Emerson College	Mar 15–17, 2019	775 (RV)	± 3.5%	44%	51%	4%	–

with Donald Trump, Bernie Sanders, and Howard Schultz

Poll source	Date(s) administered	Sample size	Margin of error	Donald Trump (R)	Bernie Sanders (D)	Howard Schultz (I)	Undecided
Emerson College	Mar 15–17, 2019	775 (RV)	± 3.5%	46%	48%	5%	–

with Donald Trump and generic Democrat

Poll source	Date(s) administered	Sample size	Margin of error	Donald Trump (R)	Generic Democrat	Other	Undecided
Baldwin Wallace University/Oakland University/Ohio Northern University	Mar 17–25, 2020	997 (RV)	± 3.7%	46.8% (Note: Figures for each candidate in this poll include undecided voters who were reported to lean towards that candidate at the time of polling.)	50.4%	–	2.8% (Note: "It depends on who the Democrats nominate" with 1.9%; "unsure" with 0.9%)
Expedition Strategies/Progressive Policies Institute	Feb 6–18, 2020	500 (RV)	–	41%	49%	–	11%
Baldwin Wallace University/Oakland University/Ohio Northern University	Jan 8–20, 2020	1,038 (RV)	± 3.3%	36.7%	51.2%	–	12%
KFF/Cook Political Report	Sep 23 – Oct 15, 2019	745 (RV)	± 4%	28%	41%	–	21%
Change Research/Crooked Media	Aug 9–11, 2019	1,966 (V)	± 2.2%	45%	46%	3% (Note: "Third-party candidate" with 3%)	6%
Public Policy Polling (D) (Note: Poll sponsored by Protect Our Care)	Apr 23–24, 2019	762 (V)	± 3.6%	44%	53%	–	4%

with Donald Trump and generic Opponent

Poll source	Date(s) administered	Sample size	Margin of error	Donald Trump (R)	Generic Opponent	Other	Undecided
Marquette University	Released Apr 7, 2019	800 (RV)	–	42%	57% (Note: "Would probably or definitely vote for someone other than Trump" with 57%)	0% (Note: "Refused" with 0%)	4%
Emerson College	Mar 15–17, 2019	775 (RV)	± 3.5%	45%	55% (Note: Listed as "unlikely to vote for Trump" as opposed to "likely to vote for Trump")	–	–
Marquette University	Jan 16–20, 2019	800 (RV)	–	39%	57%	0%	4%

=== Green Party and Kanye West ballot access lawsuits ===
In August 2020, the bipartisan Wisconsin Elections Commission voted to keep rapper Kanye West, an independent presidential candidate, off of the 2020 general election ballot in a 5–1 decision on the basis that West's application arrived too late—arriving in person seconds after the deadline.

The commission was split along party lines in a 3–3 decision to keep Howie Hawkins, the Green Party presidential candidate off of the 2020 general election ballot. Hawkins gathered 3,623 valid signatures; however, forms with 1,834 signatures had a different address for Hawkins' running mate Angela Walker. The partisan board voted only to certify the 1,789, placing Hawkins/Walker below the 2,000 signatures required to be on the ballot.

Walker subsequently filed a legal petition to be included on the ballot. On September 10, 2020, the Wisconsin Supreme Court ruled that the election officials had to wait to mail absentee ballots until the court decided whether or not to include the Green Party on the ballot. Some municipal election commissions had already mailed out absentee ballots while others were concerned that they would miss the September 17 deadline by which Wisconsin state law required absentee ballots to mailed out to those who requested them. On September 14, 2020, the court ruled that the ballots would remain as-is without Hawkins or West on the ballot stating, "given their delay in asserting their rights, we would be unable to provide meaningful relief without completely upsetting the election."

=== Electoral slates ===
These slates of electors were nominated by each party in order to vote in the Electoral College if their candidates win the state:

Donald Trump and Mike Pence Republican Party	Joe Biden and Kamala Harris Democratic Party	Jo Jorgensen and Spike Cohen Libertarian Party	Don Blankenship and William Mohr Constitution Party	Brian T. Carroll and Amar Patel American Solidarity Party
Carol Brunner; Edward Grabins; Bill Feehan; Robert Spindell; Tom Schriebel; Darryl Carlson; Pam Travis; Kelly Ruh; Andrew Hitt; Mary Buestrin	Meg Andrietsch; Shelia Stubbs; Ronald Martin; Mandela Barnes; Khary Penebaker; Mary Arnold; Patty Schachtner; Shannon Holsey; Tony Evers; Ben Wikler	Darek Raese; Patrick Baird; Stephen Ecker; Kristin Walker; Jeff Jortsch; Brian Defferding; Nathan Gall; Mike Hammond; Kevin Litten; David Grover	Nigel Brown; Dan Herro; Matthew Kloskowski; Colin Hudson; Thomas Harland; Andrew Zuelke; Elizabeth Lindee; Josh Young; Glenn Petroski; Lorraine Decker	Christopher Hansen; Thuy Quyen Tran; Steven Carlson; Stephen Beall; Patrick Malone; Charles Adams; Fergus McKiernan; Riley Drew; David Bovee; Marianne Bovee

=== Results ===
Municipal results Map legend: Biden—40–50%; Biden—50–60%; Biden—60–70%; Biden—70–80%; Biden—80–90%; Biden—90–100%; Trump–40–50%; Trump–50–60%; Trump–60–70%; Trump–70–80%; Trump–80–90%; Trump–90–100%; Tie; No Vote

2020 United States presidential election in Wisconsin
Party	Candidate	Votes	%	±%
Democratic	Joe Biden; Kamala Harris	1,630,866	49.45	+3.00
Republican	Donald Trump (incumbent); Mike Pence (incumbent)	1,610,184	48.82	+1.60
Independent (Note: Jorgensen and Cohen were nominated by the Libertarian Party of Wisconsin but placed on the ballot as independents because the party did not have ballot access.)	Jo Jorgensen; Spike Cohen	38,491	1.17	−2.41
Independent (Note: Carroll and Cohen patel were nominated by the American Solidarity Party but placed on the ballot as independents because the party did not have ballot access.)	Brian T. Carroll; Amar Patel	5,259	0.16	N/A
Constitution	Don Blankenship; William Mohr	5,146	0.16	−0.25
Independent (Note: Hawkins and Walker were nominated by the Wisconsin Green Party but registered as independent write-in candidates because the party was not recognized by the Wisconsin Secretary of State.)	Howie Hawkins (write-in); Angela Nicole Walker (write-in)	1,089	0.03	−1.01
Independent	Kanye West (write-in); Michelle Tidball (write-in)	411	0.01	N/A
Independent (Note: La Riva and Freeman were nominated by the Party for Socialism and Liberation but registered as independent write-in candidates because the party was not recognized by the Wisconsin Secretary of State.)	Gloria La Riva (write-in); Sunil Freeman (write-in)	110	0.00	N/A
Independent	Mark Charles (write-in); Adrian Wallace (write-in)	52	0.00	N/A
Independent	Jade Simmons (write-in); Claudeliah Roze (write-in)	36	0.00	N/A
Independent	Kasey Wells (write-in)	25	0.00	N/A
Independent	President R19 Boddie (write-in)	5	0.00	N/A
Write-in		6,367	0.19	−0.57
Total votes		3,298,041	100%	
Democratic gain from Republican				

Between 2016 and 2020, the number of voters in Milwaukee suburban counties voting for the Democratic presidential candidate increased.

==== By county ====
County	Joe Biden Democratic		Donald Trump Republican		Various candidates Other parties		Margin		Total votes cast
County	#	%	#	%	#	%	#	%	Total votes cast
Adams	4,329	36.63%	7,362	62.29%	127	1.08%	−3,033	−25.66%	11,818
Ashland	4,801	54.82%	3,841	43.86%	115	1.32%	960	10.96%	8,757
Barron	9,194	36.27%	15,803	62.35%	349	1.38%	−6,609	−26.08%	25,346
Bayfield	6,147	56.50%	4,617	42.44%	116	1.06%	1,530	14.06%	10,880
Brown	65,511	45.49%	75,871	52.68%	2,635	1.83%	−10,360	−7.19%	144,017
Buffalo	2,860	36.59%	4,834	61.85%	122	1.56%	−1,974	−25.26%	7,816
Burnett	3,569	35.19%	6,462	63.72%	110	1.09%	−2,893	−28.53%	10,141
Calumet	12,116	39.37%	18,156	59.00%	502	1.63%	−6,040	−19.63%	30,774
Chippewa	13,983	38.91%	21,317	59.32%	638	1.77%	−7,334	−20.41%	35,938
Clark	4,524	30.37%	10,002	67.14%	372	2.49%	−5,478	−36.77%	14,898
Columbia	16,410	48.45%	16,927	49.98%	532	1.57%	−517	−1.53%	33,869
Crawford	3,953	45.46%	4,620	53.13%	122	1.41%	−667	−7.67%	8,695
Dane	260,121	75.46%	78,794	22.86%	5,813	1.68%	181,327	52.60%	344,728
Dodge	16,356	33.77%	31,355	64.73%	725	1.50%	−14,999	−30.96%	48,436
Door	10,044	49.93%	9,752	48.48%	321	1.59%	292	1.45%	20,117
Douglas	13,218	53.56%	10,923	44.26%	536	2.18%	2,295	9.30%	24,677
Dunn	9,897	42.07%	13,173	56.00%	454	1.93%	−3,276	−13.93%	23,524
Eau Claire	31,620	54.26%	25,341	43.49%	1,314	2.25%	6,279	10.77%	58,275
Florence	781	26.56%	2,133	72.55%	26	0.89%	−1,352	−45.99%	2,940
Fond du Lac	20,588	35.96%	35,754	62.45%	909	1.59%	−15,166	−26.49%	57,251
Forest	1,721	34.06%	3,285	65.01%	47	0.93%	−1,564	−30.95%	5,053
Grant	10,998	42.95%	14,142	55.22%	468	1.83%	−3,144	−12.27%	25,608
Green	10,851	50.69%	10,169	47.51%	386	1.80%	682	3.18%	21,406
Green Lake	3,344	31.34%	7,168	67.17%	159	1.49%	−3,824	−35.83%	10,671
Iowa	7,828	55.95%	5,909	42.23%	255	1.82%	1,919	13.72%	13,992
Iron	1,533	38.23%	2,438	60.80%	39	0.97%	−905	−22.57%	4,010
Jackson	4,256	41.79%	5,791	56.86%	137	1.35%	−1,535	−15.07%	10,184
Jefferson	19,904	41.48%	27,208	56.71%	867	1.81%	−7,304	−15.23%	47,979
Juneau	4,746	34.62%	8,749	63.82%	214	1.56%	−4,003	−29.20%	13,709
Kenosha	42,193	47.55%	44,972	50.68%	1,573	1.77%	−2,779	−3.13%	88,738
Kewaunee	3,976	32.87%	7,927	65.54%	192	1.59%	−3,951	−32.67%	12,095
La Crosse	37,846	55.75%	28,684	42.25%	1,354	2.00%	9,162	13.50%	67,884
Lafayette	3,647	42.63%	4,821	56.35%	87	1.02%	−1,174	−13.72%	8,555
Langlade	3,704	33.18%	7,330	65.65%	131	1.17%	−3,626	−32.47%	11,165
Lincoln	6,261	37.95%	10,017	60.72%	219	1.33%	−3,756	−22.77%	16,497
Manitowoc	16,818	37.52%	27,218	60.72%	793	1.76%	−10,400	−23.20%	44,829
Marathon	30,808	40.14%	44,624	58.14%	1,319	1.72%	−13,816	−18.00%	76,751
Marinette	7,366	32.06%	15,304	66.60%	309	1.34%	−7,938	−34.54%	22,979
Marquette	3,239	35.73%	5,719	63.09%	107	1.18%	−2,480	−27.36%	9,065
Menominee	1,303	81.95%	278	17.48%	9	0.57%	1,025	64.47%	1,590
Milwaukee	317,527	69.07%	134,482	29.25%	7,714	1.68%	183,045	39.82%	459,723
Monroe	8,433	37.30%	13,775	60.92%	403	1.78%	−5,342	−23.62%	22,611
Oconto	6,715	28.93%	16,226	69.89%	274	1.18%	−9,511	−40.96%	23,215
Oneida	10,105	41.83%	13,671	56.59%	383	1.58%	−3,566	−14.76%	24,159
Outagamie	47,667	44.13%	58,385	54.05%	1,970	1.82%	−10,718	−9.92%	108,022
Ozaukee	26,517	43.13%	33,912	55.15%	1,057	1.72%	−7,395	−12.02%	61,486
Pepin	1,489	35.93%	2,584	62.36%	71	1.71%	−1,095	−26.43%	4,144
Pierce	9,796	42.01%	12,815	54.96%	706	3.03%	−3,019	−12.95%	23,317
Polk	9,370	35.53%	16,611	62.99%	390	1.48%	−7,241	−27.46%	26,371
Portage	20,428	50.31%	19,299	47.53%	876	2.16%	1,129	2.78%	40,603
Price	3,032	35.48%	5,394	63.12%	120	1.40%	−2,362	−27.64%	8,546
Racine	50,159	47.12%	54,479	51.18%	1,813	1.70%	−4,320	−4.06%	106,451
Richland	3,995	44.32%	4,871	54.04%	148	1.64%	−876	−9.72%	9,014
Rock	46,658	54.66%	37,138	43.51%	1,564	1.83%	9,520	11.15%	85,360
Rusk	2,517	31.92%	5,257	66.66%	112	1.42%	−2,740	−34.74%	7,886
Sauk	18,108	50.02%	17,493	48.32%	602	1.66%	615	1.70%	36,203
Sawyer	4,498	42.80%	5,909	56.22%	103	0.98%	−1,411	−13.42%	10,510
Shawano	7,131	31.53%	15,173	67.09%	311	1.38%	−8,042	−35.56%	22,615
Sheboygan	27,101	41.06%	37,609	56.97%	1,301	1.97%	−10,508	−15.91%	66,011
St. Croix	23,190	40.89%	32,199	56.78%	1,318	2.33%	−9,009	−15.89%	56,707
Taylor	2,693	25.20%	7,657	71.65%	336	3.15%	−4,964	−46.45%	10,686
Trempealeau	6,285	40.86%	8,833	57.43%	262	1.71%	−2,548	−16.57%	15,380
Vernon	7,457	46.83%	8,218	51.61%	248	1.56%	−761	−4.78%	15,923
Vilas	5,903	38.41%	9,261	60.26%	205	1.33%	−3,358	−21.85%	15,369
Walworth	22,789	39.56%	33,851	58.77%	960	1.67%	−11,062	−19.21%	57,600
Washburn	3,867	37.26%	6,334	61.03%	177	1.71%	−2,467	−23.77%	10,378
Washington	26,650	30.26%	60,237	68.40%	1,183	1.34%	−33,587	−38.14%	88,070
Waukesha	103,906	38.77%	159,649	59.57%	4,441	1.66%	−55,743	−20.80%	267,996
Waupaca	9,703	33.31%	18,952	65.06%	475	1.63%	−9,249	−31.75%	29,310
Waushara	4,388	32.34%	9,016	66.45%	164	1.21%	−4,628	−34.11%	13,568
Winnebago	44,060	46.86%	47,796	50.83%	2,176	2.31%	−3,736	−3.97%	94,032
Wood	16,365	39.63%	24,308	58.86%	625	1.51%	−7,943	−19.23%	41,298
Totals	1,630,866	49.45%	1,610,184	48.82%	56,991	1.73%	20,682	0.63%	3,298,041

Counties that flipped from Republican to Democratic

- Door (largest municipality: Sturgeon Bay)
- Sauk (largest municipality: Baraboo)

==== By congressional district ====
Despite narrowly losing, Trump won six of eight congressional districts in Wisconsin, including one held by a Democrat.

District	Trump	Biden	Representative
1st	53.8%	44.6%	Bryan Steil
2nd	29.1%	69.2%	Mark Pocan
3rd	51.4%	46.7%	Ron Kind
4th	22.5%	75.9%	Gwen Moore
5th	56.7%	41.6%	Jim Sensenbrenner
5th	56.7%	41.6%	Scott Fitzgerald
6th	56.7%	41.5%	Glenn Grothman
7th	59.1%	39.2%	Tom Tiffany
8th	57.1%	41.2%	Mike Gallagher

== Analysis ==
Prior to the 2016 election, Wisconsin was considered part of the blue wall—the group of states that had voted Democratic in every presidential election from at least 1992 on. Wisconsin itself had voted Democratic in every election from 1988 on, having been one of 10 states that supported Michael Dukakis in 1988. Republicans had scored notable statewide victories over the Obama presidency, with Scott Walker having won election and re-election as Governor and having fought off a recall attempt in 2012, and with Ron Johnson having defeated Russ Feingold in the 2010 Senate election. Nevertheless, Wisconsin was seen as a lean-Democratic state given its presidential voting history. Trump pulled off a surprise win in the state in 2016, in large part due to a collapse in support for Hillary Clinton in the state.

In 2020, both Trump and Biden improved their parties' vote shares in Wisconsin. Trump achieved a record for the total number of votes ever received by a Republican presidential nominee in Wisconsin, although he fell short of George W. Bush's 2004 vote share. Biden improved on Hillary Clinton's number of votes received, as he did in every state, but fell short of the number of votes won by Barack Obama in 2008.

Joe Biden received strong support in the city of Milwaukee, improving on Clinton's 2016 performance by 3.6 points in its county; Biden received 92% and 60% of the black and Latino vote respectively, with most of that electorate living in Milwaukee County. Both candidates performed well in the state with whites, with Trump carrying whites overall by 6 points, though Biden performed better with college-educated whites. Cementing Biden's victory was his strong performance in Dane County, which he carried by nearly 53 points. Biden would also carry La Crosse County by 13 points, Eau Claire County by 10 points, and flipped Sauk County and the bellwether Door County, while only losing Brown County by seven points, winning the county seat Green Bay. Biden even made in-roads in Waukesha and Washington counties, nearly breaking 40% in the former and breaking 30% in the latter, though Trump still held these counties with large margins.

On the other hand, Trump was able to hold much of the Driftless region in southwestern Wisconsin; many of these counties, such as Vernon, Crawford, and Grant were reliably Democratic during the latter half of the 20th century, but Trump maintained his results from 2016, solidifying a Republican shift in this part of the state. Additionally, Trump performed strongly in the more traditionally conservative northern counties of Wisconsin. Finally, Trump kept Kenosha County in his column, with both candidates improving there; Kenosha County is significant, as it was the site of the Jacob Blake shooting, which triggered nationwide protests.

Biden became the first Democrat to win the White House without the once-strongly Democratic counties of Kenosha and Forest since Woodrow Wilson in 1916 as well as the first to win without Pepin County since 1944. He was the first Democrat since 1960 to win without Adams, Buffalo, Crawford, Dunn, Jackson, Juneau, Lincoln, Price, Sawyer, and Trempealeau counties; and the first since 1976 to win without Columbia, Grant, Lafayette, Marquette, Racine, Richland, and Vernon counties. In terms of partisan lean, Biden was able to win 7% of Republicans in the state, which is significant, as they voted in this cycle by about 5 points more than Democrats. More importantly, Biden won independent voters by 12 points; Hillary Clinton lost this bloc to Trump by 10 points in 2016.

=== Pivot counties ===
Wisconsin is a state with a notable number of pivot counties, meaning counties carried by Obama in the 2008 and 2012 U.S. presidential elections that then flipped for the Republican candidate, Trump, in 2016. Of Wisconsin's 72 counties, about one-third (N=23, 32%) are considered to be pivot counties, and pivot counties include 17.35 percent of the state population. Lists of Wisconsin pivot counties a) retained by the Republican presidential candidate in 2020 (Trump) and b) boomerang counties "returning" to the Democratic presidential candidate in 2020 (Biden) are below.

==== Retained pivot counties (remained Republican in 2020) ====
- Adams
- Buffalo
- Columbia
- Crawford
- Dunn
- Forest
- Grant
- Jackson
- Juneau
- Kenosha
- Lafayette
- Lincoln
- Marquette
- Pepin
- Price
- Racine
- Richland
- Sawyer
- Trempealeau
- Vernon
- Winnebago

==== Boomerang pivot counties (returned to Democrat in 2020) ====
- Door
- Sauk

=== Edison exit polls ===
2020 presidential election in Wisconsin by demographic subgroup (Edison exit polling)
Demographic subgroup	Biden	Trump	% of total vote
Total vote	49.4	48.8	99
Ideology
Liberals	91	8	25
Moderates	60	38	38
Conservatives	11	88	36
Party
Democrats	96	4	32
Republicans	7	93	37
Independents	54	42	31
Gender
Men	44	54	50
Women	56	43	50
Race/ethnicity
White	46	52	86
Black	92	8	6
Latino	60	37	4
Age
18–24 years old	61	33	8
25–29 years old	56	40	5
30–39 years old	52	46	14
40–49 years old	53	46	14
50–64 years old	46	53	32
65 and older	47	53	26
Sexual orientation
LGBT	80	16	5
Heterosexual	48	51	95
Education
High school or less	44	54	22
Some college education	49	49	27
Associate degree	43	56	16
Bachelor's degree	52	46	23
Postgraduate degree	68	31	11
Income
Under $30,000	65	31	15
$30,000–49,999	55	44	20
$50,000–99,999	47	52	38
$100,000–199,999	43	56	21
Over $200,000	45	55	5
Union households
Yes	59	40	14
No	48	51	86
Issue regarded as most important
Racial inequality	91	6	13
Coronavirus	88	11	19
Economy	13	85	35
Crime and safety	17	82	13
Health care	81	19	8
Region
Milwaukee County	69	29	14
Milwaukee Suburbs	41	58	22
Dane County	76	23	10
Fox River Valley/N. Lakeshore	43	55	17
Southwest	47	52	19
North	39	59	17
Area type
Urban	69	30	30
Suburban	43	55	49
Rural	38	60	22
Family's financial situation today
Better than four years ago	16	83	39
Worse than four years ago	87	12	21
About the same	63	35	40

== Aftermath ==
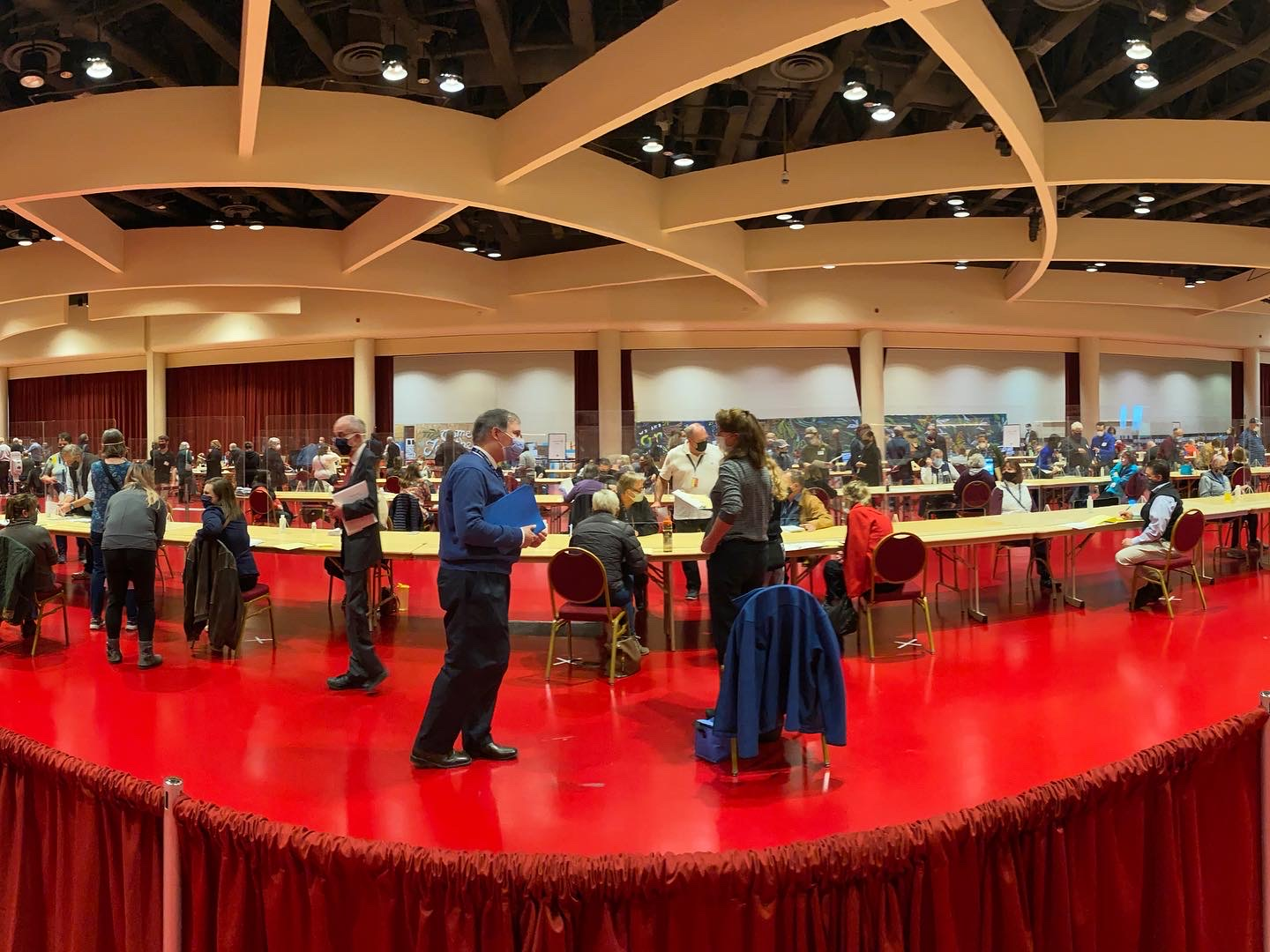
Dane County recount being conducted at Monona Terrace in Madison, Wisconsin

On November 6, Trump campaign manager Bill Stepien said: "There have been reports of irregularities in several Wisconsin counties which raise serious doubts about the validity of the results." No evidence of such "irregularities" has been provided by the Trump campaign.

On November 18, the Trump campaign wired nearly $3 million to the Wisconsin Election Commission in a petition for a partial recount of the 2020 presidential election results. The recount would take place in Milwaukee and Dane counties. "These two counties were selected because they are the locations of the worst irregularities," the campaign claimed in a release.

Milwaukee certified its recount results on November 27, 2020, and led to Joe Biden gaining a net 132 votes. Dane certified its recount results on November 29, 2020, and led to Donald Trump gaining a net 45 votes. In total, the recount across the two counties led to Joe Biden increasing his lead by an additional 87 votes.

In July 2022, the Wisconsin Supreme Court stated that "ballot drop boxes are illegal under Wisconsin statutes" in the 2022 United States elections. That ruling was overturned by the same court in July 2024 for the 2024 United States elections.

== Electors ==
On November 30, Wisconsin Governor Tony Evers certified Wisconsin's electors for Biden. The following electors all cast their vote for Biden:

- Meg Andrietsch
- Shelia Stubbs
- Ronald Martin
- Mandela Barnes
- Khary Penebaker
- Mary Arnold
- Patty Schachtner
- Shannon Holsey
- Tony Evers
- Ben Wikler

== See also ==
- United States presidential elections in Wisconsin
- Voter suppression in the United States 2019–2020: Wisconsin
- 2020 Wisconsin elections
- 2020 United States presidential election
- 2020 Democratic Party presidential primaries
- 2020 Republican Party presidential primaries
- 2020 United States elections

== Notes ==
Voter samples and additional candidates

Partisan clients
