= Michael Gableman =

American judge (born 1966)

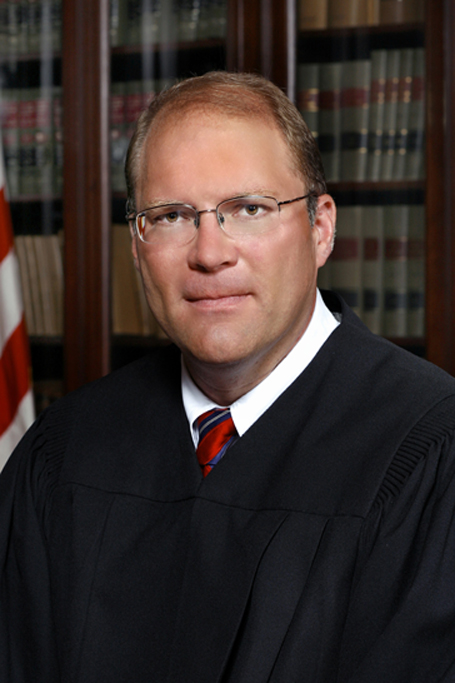
- 2008 portrait

Justice of the Wisconsin Supreme Court
- In office August 1, 2008 – July 31, 2018
- Preceded by: Louis B. Butler
- Succeeded by: Rebecca Dallet

Wisconsin Circuit Court Judge for the Burnett Circuit
- In office May 2002 – July 31, 2008
- Appointed by: Scott McCallum
- Preceded by: James Taylor
- Succeeded by: Kenneth Kutz

District Attorney of Ashland County
- In office May 1999 – May 2002
- Appointed by: Tommy Thompson
- Preceded by: J. B. Van Hollen
- Succeeded by: Sean Duffy

Personal details
- Born: September 18, 1966 (age 60) West Allis, Wisconsin, U.S.
- Party: Republican
- Education: Ripon College (BA); Hamline University (JD)

Michael J. Gableman (born September 18, 1966) is an American lawyer and former justice of the Wisconsin Supreme Court (2008–2018). A Republican, he has been described as a hard-line conservative.

From June 2021 until August 2022, Gableman was employed as a "special counsel" by Wisconsin Assembly speaker Robin Vos to investigate the results of the 2020 United States presidential election in Wisconsin. His fourteen-month investigation resulted in various unsubstantiated accusations against municipal clerks and members of the Wisconsin Elections Commission, and cost the state more than two million dollars. Gableman himself became a lightning rod for controversy and was the subject of several lawsuits and personal disputes with other officials; he was ultimately fired by Vos just three days after the August 2022 primary elections in Wisconsin. Vos later referred to Gableman as "an embarrassment to the state".

In a February 2024 settlement to one lawsuit, Assembly Republican leadership conceded that Gableman had violated state public records laws during his investigation. In April 2025, Gableman accepted a three-year suspension of his license to practice law to settle ongoing legal and ethical complaints stemming from his investigation and the subsequent litigation.

== Early life and education ==
Michael J. Gableman was born in West Allis, Wisconsin, in 1966 and raised in Waukesha County. He is a graduate of New Berlin West High School (1984) and Ripon College (1988), where he earned a bachelor's degree in education and history. After college, Gableman taught American history at George Washington High School in the Milwaukee Public School system (1988–1989) before pursuing a legal career. He graduated from Hamline University School of Law in 1993.

== Early legal career ==
While in law school, he worked as a part-time law clerk in the United States Attorney's office in Minneapolis. After graduating, he served as a law clerk at the state district court level in Douglas County, Minnesota, and the state circuit court level in Brown County, Wisconsin. He became a half-time assistant district attorney in Langlade County, Wisconsin, in 1996, and worked the other half time at a private law office while also serving as deputy corporation counsel for Forest County. Gableman then worked as an assistant district attorney in Marathon County.

== Public office ==
In May 1999, governor Tommy Thompson appointed Gableman to the vacant post of district attorney of Ashland County. Gableman was elected to a full term in this office in 2002, but resigned shortly after his election to accept an appointment as an administrative law judge in the Wisconsin Department of Workforce Development.

Later that year, Gableman was appointed Wisconsin circuit court judge for Burnett County, by Governor Scott McCallum. He was elected to a full term in the April 2003 general election, receiving 78% of the vote over Burnett County district attorney Kenneth L. Kutz.

In Burnett County, Gableman established an inmate community service program, a juvenile community service program, a drug and alcohol court, and a restorative justice program for which he served as chairman of the board for six years. He also was an adjunct professor of law at Hamline University School of Law, teaching criminal procedure and professional responsibility.

In October 2007, Gableman announced he would run for Wisconsin Supreme Court, challenging incumbent justice Louis B. Butler. Gableman described himself as a judicial conservative. In the April 1, 2008, general election, Gableman narrowly defeated Butler and became the first challenger to defeat an incumbent Wisconsin supreme court justice since 1967.

== Wisconsin Supreme Court ==
Gableman's election in 2008 was seen as part of a trend of outside big-money interests becoming a major factor in state judiciary elections.

The Wisconsin Judicial Commission brought an ethics charge against Gableman. The charges alleged that a campaign advertisement in which he accused Butler of working "to put criminals on the street" and accusing Butler of finding a "loophole" that resulted in the release of a child molester, was false and misleading. Gableman claimed in the defense of his ad that his free speech rights were violated by the judicial conduct rule he was accused of breaking.

A three-judge panel was then charged with the preliminary investigation into whether the campaign ad violated the Wisconsin Code of Judicial Conduct. In November 2009, the panel unanimously recommended that the complaint against Gableman be dismissed. Procedure required that the Wisconsin Supreme Court make the final determination as to whether there was an ethics violation. When the court deadlocked 3-3, the commission stopped pursuing the case.

In January 2011, the group 9to5 Milwaukee filed an ethics complaint with the Wisconsin Government Accountability Board against Gableman for failing to recuse himself from a case in which he allegedly had a financial interest. Gableman received legal counsel from July 2008 to July 2010 from the Wisconsin law firm of Michael Best & Friedrich on a contingency fee basis. He received the services from the law firm as it defended him against a separate ethics charge. Gableman never declared the receipt of the services in his official disclosure statements. Critics characterized the legal contingency-fee arrangement as "free" legal services, a characterization Michael Best & Friedrich rejected.

In 2017, Gableman said he would not run for re-election in 2018.

== Investigation into 2020 election results ==
Following Joe Biden's victory in the 2020 United States presidential election, the defeated incumbent, Donald Trump, refused to concede, made claims of fraud and launched a campaign to challenge the results in a number of states, including Wisconsin. Gableman injected himself into the discussion and suggested the election was "stolen" from Trump.

Following Biden's inauguration in 2021, Wisconsin Republicans hired Gableman to investigate the conduct of the 2020 United States presidential election in Wisconsin. Gableman's appointment came just 15 hours after former president Donald Trump had accused Vos and other Wisconsin Republicans of engaging in a "cover up" of the election results.

Gableman issued subpoenas to a number of local officials in Green Bay and Milwaukee, subsequently admitting that he didn't actually understand how elections were supposed to be conducted. His fourteen-month investigation resulted in various unsubstantiated accusations against municipal clerks and members of the Wisconsin Elections Commission, but found nothing of substance. Gableman himself became a lightning rod for controversy; he called for opponents of his review to lose their offices, he called for witnesses to be jailed if they did not comply with his interview process, he was the target of several lawsuits, and he was fined for contempt due to his record-keeping practices.

=== Staff and Investigation ===
The watchdog group American Oversight released documents obtained by an open record act request in a lawsuit against Assembly Speaker Republican Robin Vos. They show that Gableman's staff for his Republican party review of the state's 2020 presidential election, was initially provided with a $676,000 budget in public funds for a process that was supposed to end by November. His staff included members of former President Donald Trump's administration, conspiracy theorists, and others who have falsely claimed the 2020 election was stolen. They have examined election records in search of fraud.

Gableman earned $11,000 a month. Some staff members, including former White House attorney Andrew Kloster, received up to $5,000 a month or $450 hourly. Ron Heuer, president of a group that sued to overturn the results of the election, was paid $3,250 monthly. Clint Lancaster, an Arkansas attorney was paid $10,000 monthly while others, including a former Milwaukee Police detective, earned $40 hourly.

The American Oversight-released document show that the review staff made amateur mistakes and communicated with conservative businessman Mike Lindell, owner of the "My Pillow" company. Gableman and his staff also visited the site of a Maricopa County, Arizona "audit" as well as a South Dakota "symposium" Lindell operated. Wisconsin taxpayers underwrote thousands in travel expenses. Gableman had spent $175,500, the bulk being paid for staff salaries. He and many of his staff members have made the false claim that Trump won the 2020 election. Biden actually won Wisconsin by 20,682 votes.

=== Critics ===
The review has been criticized for being a waste of taxpayer money and for harming public confidence in Wisconsin’s elections. In late November, Gableman requested a Waukesha County judge to order the local Sheriff’s Office to arrest the mayors of Green Bay and Madison for failure to appear to testify. Such testimony demanded of local and state election officials has generated considerable contention with simultaneous court battles happening in widespread jurisdictions. Officials have said they would testify in public forums, but Gableman insisted he be allowed to question them privately. The state statutes permitting legislative committees to appoint special counsels to conduct investigations require public testimony.

Wisconsin Attorney General Josh Kaul (D) filed a lawsuit against Gableman and his attempt to subpoena Wisconsin Elections Commission Administrator Meagan Wolfe. An attorney for the Green Bay mayor threatened to file for sanctions against Gableman over his attempt at arresting the targeted mayors. Hearings regarding those cases were scheduled for December 22nd and 23rd, 2021.

When the Gableman inquiry was criticized by Republican state Sen. Kathleen Bernier, Gableman said he hoped that Bernier would not be re-elected.

In 2022, Gableman said that mayors and others who refused to be interviewed by him behind closed doors should be incarcerated.

=== Report ===
Gableman released his interim report in March 2022. The report endorsed numerous debunked claims of fraud and conspiracy theories. It also made false assertions about lawmakers’ power to decertify President Biden’s victory. The report made false claims based on incomplete and misinterpreted data, particularly related to voting in nursing homes, and Gableman's office declined to answer questions from journalists about Gableman's unsubstantiated claims.

Gableman's report cited The Gateway Pundit, a far-right conspiracy website. Wisconsin governor Tony Evers called the report "a colossal waste of taxpayer dollars."

During the course of the probe, Gableman's team either ignored or was slow to respond to records requests by journalists and watchdog groups. Court documents in April 2022 revealed that Gableman routinely deleted emails, text messages and other documents gathered and produced by his probe.

=== Contempt of Court, Referral to OLR, and Firing ===
On June 15, 2022, Gableman was found in contempt by Circuit Court Judge Frank D. Remington after he refused to answer questions in the courtroom after being subpoenaed to appear. The Court stated, "Gableman's demeaning conduct has discredited the profession and every other person sworn 'to commit themselves to live by the constitutional processes of our system'." The Court imposed fines on Gableman of $2,000 a day until he complies with court orders related to the open records requests, and reported his conduct to Wisconsin's Office of Lawyer Regulation for "appropriate disciplinary action."

On August 12, 2022, Gableman was fired by Speaker Vos after endorsing Vos' challenger in the 2022 primary election. Gableman's firing came three days after Vos narrowly defeated his primary challenger by 260 votes. Vos would later criticize Gableman's conduct in the probe, going as far as commenting in 2024 that he hoped Gableman would be disbarred for his conduct during the probe, calling him an "embarrassment" both to all lawyers and to the state of Wisconsin.

Although Gableman's position was terminated in August 2022, at least four lawsuits related to his contract, record keeping, and use of authority continued well into 2023, costing Wisconsin taxpayers additional millions in legal expenses.

In August 2023, progressive-leaning voting rights firm Law Forward filed a grievance against Gableman with the State Bar of Wisconsin's Office of Lawyer Regulation. In November 2024, the OLR filed a complaint against Gableman detailing ten counts of misconduct in which Gableman had violated professional rules of conduct for attorneys during the probe. The complaint was 75 pages long and accused Gableman of mischaracterizing discussions with Green Bay and Madison city officials, lying about improper communications with city officials, false testimony, disregard for open records laws, using the investigation for personal gain, breaching his duty of confidentiality with Vos and the State Assembly by disclosing discussions with Vos and his staff, and lying to the OLR during its investigation.

In April 2025, Gableman reached a settlement in which he accepted a three-year suspension of his law license (being disbarred). The OLR and Gableman jointly filed a stipulation with the Wisconsin Supreme Court detailing this agreement. In the stipulation, Gableman acknowledged that he was unable to "successfully defend" himself against the OLR's allegations, and conceded that there was "an adequate factual basis" to the allegations. This settlement deal will go before a referee overseeing the case, before going before the state supreme court for final approval.

== Electoral history ==
=== Wisconsin Circuit Court (2003) ===
Wisconsin Circuit Court, Burnett Circuit Election, 2003
Party	Candidate	Votes	%	±%
Nonpartisan Primary, February 18, 2003 (top-two)
Nonpartisan	Michael Gableman (incumbent)	1,582	72.37%	
Nonpartisan	Kenneth L. Kutz	446	20.40%	
Nonpartisan	Dennis C. Lieder	158	7.23%	
	Scattering	0	0.0%	
Total votes		2,186	100.0%	
General Election, April 1, 2003
Nonpartisan	Michael Gableman (incumbent)	3,263	78.17%	
Nonpartisan	Kenneth L. Kutz	909	21.78%	
	Scattering	2	0.05%	
Plurality		2,354	56.40%	
Total votes		4,174	100.0%	

=== Wisconsin Supreme Court (2008) ===
2008 Wisconsin Supreme Court election
Party	Candidate	Votes	%	±%
General Election, April 1, 2008
Nonpartisan	Michael Gableman	425,101	51.19%	
Nonpartisan	Louis B. Butler (incumbent)	402,798	48.50%	
	Scattering	2,551	0.31%	
Plurality		22,303	2.69%	
Total votes		830,450	100.0%	

Legal offices
Preceded by J. B. Van Hollen	District Attorney of Ashland County, Wisconsin; May 1999 – May 2002	Succeeded by Sean Duffy
Preceded by James Taylor	Wisconsin Circuit Court Judge for the Burnett Circuit; May 2002 – July 31, 2008	Succeeded by Kenneth Kutz
Preceded by Louis B. Butler	Justice of the Wisconsin Supreme Court; August 1, 2008 – July 31, 2018	Succeeded by Rebecca Dallet
