= Michael I. Krauss =

American legal scholar

Michael Ian Krauss (born April 21, 1951) is a professor emeritus of law at Antonin Scalia Law School (previously George Mason University School of Law), specializing in tort law, products liability, jurisprudence and legal ethics.

== Biography ==
Krauss was born in New York City and raised in Canada. He holds a Bachelor of Arts degree from Carleton University. He received a Bachelor of Laws from l'Université de Sherbrooke. Krauss also holds an LL.M. from Yale Law School. He was hired as clerk to the Louis-Philippe Pigeon of Canada's Supreme Court. Krauss went on to practice corporate law in Québec City, and in 1983, completed his doctoral residency as Columbia University's Law and Economics Fellow. He has taught at law schools in French Canada, English Canada, the United States, France, Israel, and Guatemala.

In 1994, Krauss was awarded George Mason University's Teacher of the Year award.

Krauss was elected to the American Law Institute in 2008 and is a member of the Board of Governors of the National Association of Scholars. He has been a member of the Legal Education Task Force of the Virginia State Bar since 2011 and was a member of the Maryland State Advisory Committee to the United States Commission for Civil Rights from 2011 to 2013. He has also been a Commissioner for Québec's Human Rights Commission.

From 2011 to 2012, Krauss was Of Counsel to the Clearspire Law Firm.

Krauss was faculty advisor to George Mason's Federalist Society chapter, and has lectured at other Federalist Society chapters. Krauss endorsed Donald Trump for president in the 2020 United States presidential election.

In 2020, Krauss achieved emeritus status at the Antonin Scalia Law School.

== Publications ==
Krauss has written three books:

- Fire & Smoke: Government, Lawsuits, and the Rule of Law (ISBN 978-0945999829),
- Principles of Products Liability (ISBN 978-0314289339)
- Legal Ethics in a Nutshell (ISBN 978-0314143556) (co-authored).
