= Louis B. Butler =

21st century American judge

The Honorable Louis B. Butler Jr.
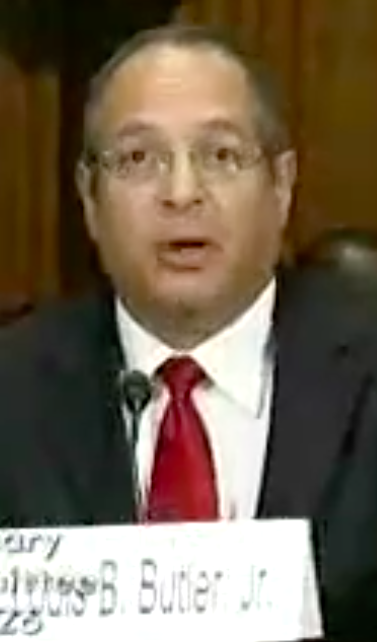
- Butler in 2009

Justice of the Wisconsin Supreme Court
- In office August 1, 2004 – July 31, 2008
- Appointed by: Jim Doyle
- Preceded by: Diane S. Sykes
- Succeeded by: Michael Gableman

Wisconsin Circuit Court Judge for the Milwaukee Circuit, Branch 9
- In office August 1, 2002 – August 2004
- Preceded by: Robert W. Crawford
- Succeeded by: Paul R. Van Grunsven

Personal details
- Born: Louis Bennett Butler Jr. February 15, 1952 (age 74) Chicago, Illinois, U.S.
- Spouse: Irene
- Children: 2
- Education: Lawrence University (B.A.); University of Wisconsin Law School (J.D.)

Louis Bennett Butler Jr. (born February 15, 1952) is a former justice of the Wisconsin Supreme Court. Butler was appointed to the Supreme Court by Governor Jim Doyle in August 2004; his term expired on July 31, 2008. He is the first African American to serve on the Wisconsin Supreme Court. He was nominated by President Barack Obama to serve as a United States district judge in the United States District Court for the Western District of Wisconsin, but his nomination never received a vote in the Senate.

== Biography ==
Louis Butler was born and raised in Chicago, Illinois. He earned his bachelor's degree from Lawrence University in 1973 and his Juris Doctor from the University of Wisconsin Law School in 1977.

After serving as an assistant state public defender from 1979 to 1992, Louis Butler was appointed to the Municipal Court in Milwaukee, Wisconsin. He served as a municipal judge until 2002, when he was elected a Wisconsin circuit court judge for Milwaukee County, defeating incumbent judge Robert Crawford. Butler also served as an adjunct professor at Marquette University Law School.

Butler campaigned for a seat on the Wisconsin Supreme Court in 2000, but lost his election bid to incumbent Diane Sykes by a wide margin. After being appointed to the Wisconsin Supreme Court in 2004, he was defeated by the Judge Michael Gableman in the April 1, 2008 elections. Butler was the first sitting Wisconsin Supreme Court justice to be defeated in a reelection campaign since 1967. The Wall Street Journal argued this loss stemmed from opinions he wrote in medical malpractice, search and seizure, and product liability cases. Business groups, including Wisconsin Manufacturers & Commerce (WMC), paid for a large number of issue ads in this campaign cycle, although the Butler campaign outspent Gableman's by several hundred thousand dollars.

Since his defeat, Butler agreed to serve a two-year term as Justice-in-Residence at the University of Wisconsin Law School, where he would teach several courses and clinics for the 2008–2010 academic years.

On September 30, 2009, President Barack Obama nominated Butler to serve as United States District Court for the Western District of Wisconsin. However, his nomination was returned to the President on December 24, 2009. Obama renominated Butler on January 20, 2010, but the Senate returned the nomination to the President on August 5, 2010. Obama then renominated Butler on September 13, 2010. NPR commented on the Senate's reluctance to confirm Butler in an August 4, 2011 article:

"Some of the longest waiting nominees, Louis Butler of Wisconsin, Charles Bernard Day of Maryland and Edward Dumont of Washington happen to be black or openly gay."

His nomination was returned to the President on December 17, 2011, pursuant to the rules of the Senate.

== See also ==
- List of African-American jurists
- Barack Obama judicial appointment controversies

Legal offices
Preceded by Robert W. Crawford	Wisconsin Circuit Court Judge for the Milwaukee Circuit, Branch 9 August 1, 2002 – July 31, 2004	Succeeded by Paul R. Van Grunsven
Preceded by Diane S. Sykes	Justice of the Wisconsin Supreme Court; August 1, 2004 – July 31, 2008	Succeeded by Michael Gableman
