= Wisconsin Manufacturers & Commerce =

Business association in Wisconsin, US

- Type: Private
- Founded: 1975
- Headquarters: Madison, Wisconsin
- Website: www.wmc.org

Wisconsin Manufacturers & Commerce (WMC) is an association of manufacturers, service businesses and chambers of commerce located in Madison, Wisconsin. WMC was formed from what was the Wisconsin State Chamber of Commerce, the Wisconsin Manufacturers Association, and the Wisconsin Council of Safety in 1975. WMC engages in earned media, advocacy, and business development. WMC came under fire in 1996 for an issue ad aimed at Democrats in the state. Initially, the ad was forced off the air but WMC sued to have the ad reinstated, citing free speech rights. The Milwaukee Journal Sentinel referred to WMC as "the state's most influential business lobbying group".

== History and composition ==
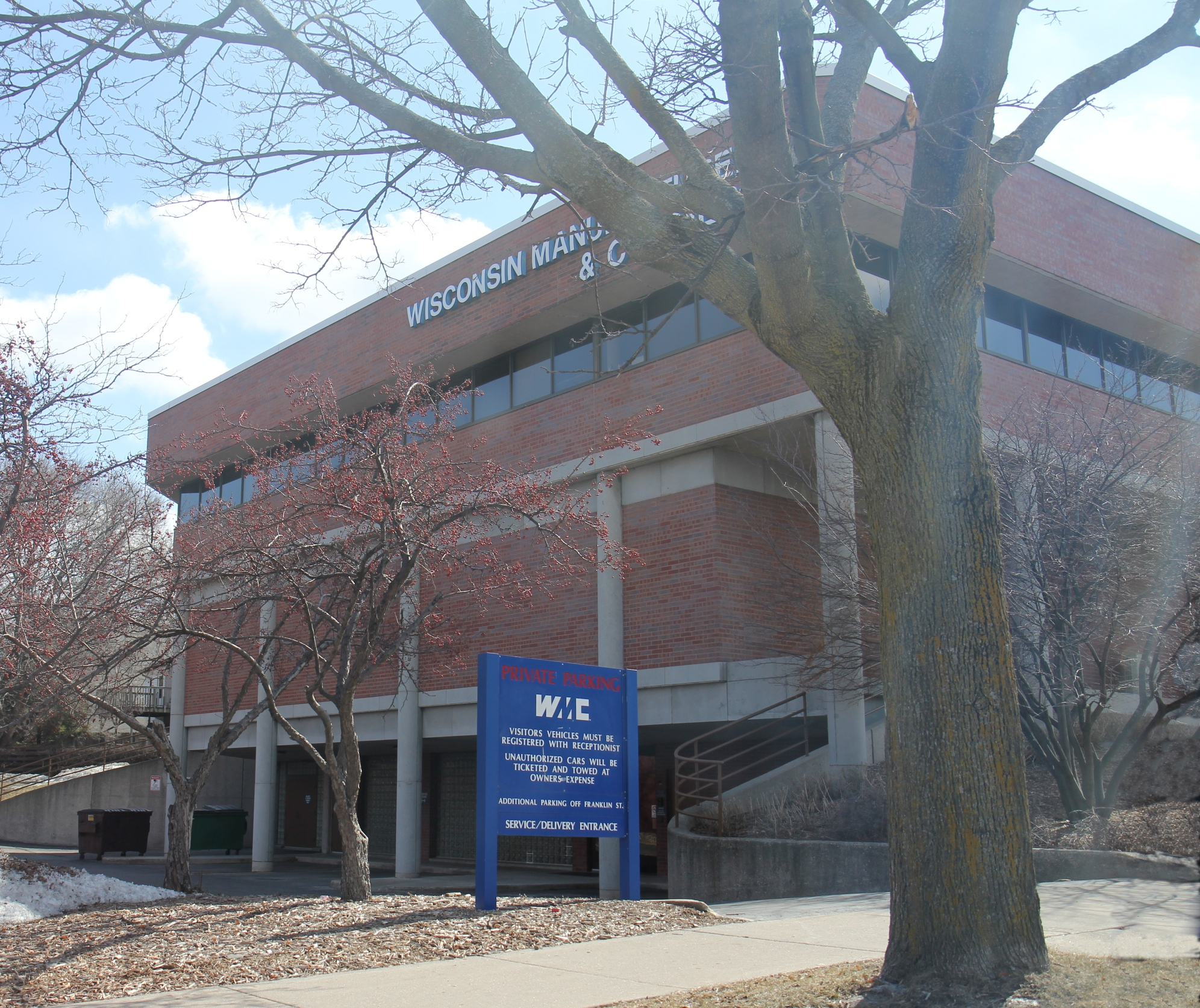
Building in Madison

The Wisconsin Manufacturers Association, which merged with two other Wisconsin business organizations in 1975 to form Wisconsin Manufacturers & Commerce, was founded in 1911. Paul Hassett was the first president of the newly formed organization, which had approximately 2,500 charter members. Since its inception, WMC has lobbied for the passage of business-friendly legislation in the Wisconsin Legislature. As of 2008, WMC claims over 4,000 charter members among the business community in Wisconsin. It publishes two annual directories: one of state manufacturers and the other a directory of service companies. It also claims to represent 500 000 employees.

=== 1996 election ===
During the 1996 election, WMC sponsored a series of 'issue ads' against state Democrats. The Wisconsin State Election Board blocked the ads, arguing that WMC violated state and federal election laws by running an election ad as group whose donor base was not divulged to the FEC and state election boards. WMC sued, citing free speech concerns. After two appellate court rulings against WMC, the State Supreme Court ruled narrowly in WMC's favor. State political leaders cited this supreme court case when preparing legislation in later years.

=== 2008 election ===
WMC spent more than 1.2 million dollars in support of Michael Gableman's campaign for State Supreme Court Justice, successfully ousting sitting Justice Louis Butler. Justice Louis Butler subsequently asserted that three cases in particular caused WMC to target him. One favored the families of three men killed when a giant crane collapsed during construction of Miller Park; another struck down the cap on medical malpractice damages for pain and suffering, and the third expanded the liability of paint manufacturers in cases of lead poisoning. This spending and subsequent advertisement were criticized by members of the Madison press, the state bar and the Brennan Center, a non-partisan policy center at New York University.

== Activities ==
WMC does not disclose their issue advocacy donors list to the public. WMC describes itself as lobbying on behalf of its members "whenever the state legislature is in session." According to the Wisconsin Government Accountability Board, WMC was responsible for 1.1 million dollars in lobbying efforts during the 2007-2009 session of the state legislature. WMC also publishes ratings of Wisconsin legislators on a scale of 0 to 100.

Beyond lobbying efforts, WMC commissions annual surveys of business owners, directories and information, and—through their non-profit Wisconsin Council of Safety—workplace safety compliance information. WMC works with the state Department of Workforce Development to secure federal grants to train workers in Wisconsin.

== Advocacy ==
=== Opposition to parental leave legislation ===
In 1989, WMC helped block passage of Wisconsin's family leave act on behalf of their members.

=== Opposition to military right-to-repair legislation ===
In July 2024, WMC signed a letter to members of both the House Committee on Armed Services and the Senate Committee on Armed Services opposing Section 828 of S. 4628, the National Defense Authorization Act for Fiscal Year 2025, entitled "Requirement for Contractors to Provide Reasonable Access to Repair Materials," which would require contractors doing business with the US military to agree "to provide the Department of Defense fair and reasonable access to all the repair materials, including parts, tools, and information, used by the manufacturer or provider or their authorized partners to diagnose, maintain, or repair the good or service."

== Criticism ==
In August 2008 the outgoing Chancellor of UW-Madison, John Wiley, described the WMC as being "hijacked by highly partisan ideologically driven staff," stating that "WMC routinely opposes most measures favored by labor unions, and most measures aimed at improving the lot of entry-level and low-income workers who are essential to our economy. But this opposition is not a business or an economic position; it is a political position based on an era and an economy that no longer exist."
