= 2026 Wisconsin Attorney General election =

- November 3, 2026
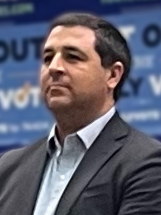

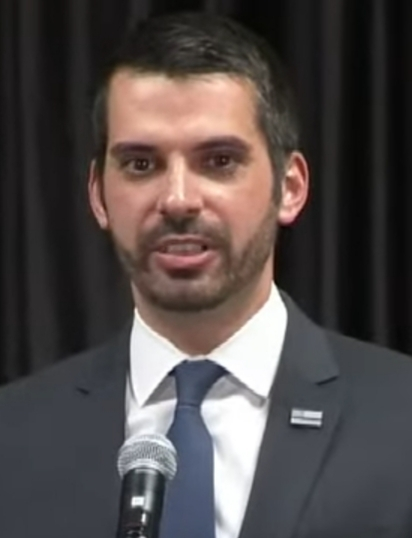
Candidate	Josh Kaul	Eric Toney
Party	Democratic	Republican
Popular vote	1,450,695	1,204,176
Percentage	54.64%	45.36%
- Kaul: 50–60% 60–70% 70–80% 80–90% Toney: 50–60% 60–70% 70–80%
attorney general before election
Josh Kaul
Democratic
Elected attorney general
Josh Kaul
Democratic

The 2026 Wisconsin Attorney General election was held on November 3, 2026, to elect the attorney general of Wisconsin. Democratic incumbent Josh Kaul won re-election to a third term, defeating Republican district attorney and former nominee Eric Toney. The general election was a rematch of the 2022 election.

This was one of four Democratic-held attorneys general positions up for election in 2026 in a state that Donald Trump won in the 2024 presidential election.

== Democratic primary ==
=== Candidates ===
==== Nominee ====
- Josh Kaul, incumbent attorney general (2019–present)

=== Endorsements ===
Josh Kaul

U.S. representatives

- Mark Pocan, WI-02 (2013–present)

Labor unions

- Wisconsin AFL-CIO

Organizations

- End Citizens United
- Reproductive Freedom for All
- Fair Wisconsin

=== Results ===
Democratic primary results
Party	Candidate	Votes	%
Democratic	Josh Kaul (incumbent)	673,582	99.7
Write-in		2,280	0.3
Total votes		675,862	100.0

== Republican primary ==
=== Candidates ===
==== Nominee ====
- Eric Toney, Fond du Lac County district attorney and nominee in 2022

=== Endorsements ===
Eric Toney

U.S. representatives

- Scott Fitzgerald, WI-05 (2021–present)

Organizations

- Republican Party of Wisconsin

=== Results ===
Republican primary results
Party	Candidate	Votes	%
Republican	Eric Toney	423,342	99.7
Write-in		1,164	0.3
Total votes		424,506	100.0

== General election ==
=== Predictions ===
Source	Ranking	As of
Sabato's Crystal Ball	Lean D	August 20, 2026

=== Post-primary endorsements ===
Josh Kaul (D)

Labor unions

- AFT-Wisconsin
- Service Employees International Union Wisconsin
- United Auto Workers
- Wisconsin AFL-CIO

Organizations

- Everytown for Gun Safety
- Fair Wisconsin
- Giffords
- National Association of Social Workers Wisconsin
- Planned Parenthood

Newspapers

- The Badger Herald
- The Capital Times
- Milwaukee Courier
- The Shepherd Express

=== Polling ===
Poll source	Date(s) administered	Sample size (Note: Key: A – all adults RV – registered voters LV – likely voters V – unclear)	Margin of error	Josh Kaul (D)	Eric Toney (R)	Undecided
Global Strategy Group (D) (Note: Poll sponsored by the Democratic Attorneys General Association.)	September 27 – October 1, 2026	800 (LV)	± 3.5%	50%	43%	7%

=== Results ===
2026 Wisconsin Attorney General election
Party	Candidate	Votes	%	±%
Democratic	Josh Kaul (incumbent)	1,450,695	54.64%	
Republican	Eric Toney	1,204,176	45.36%	
Write-in				
Total votes			100.0%	
Democratic hold				

== Notes ==
Partisan clients
