= Jon P. Wilcox =

Retired American judge (born 1936)

The Honorable Jon P. Wilcox
- portrait, circa 1973

Justice of the Wisconsin Supreme Court
- In office October 8, 1992 – July 31, 2007
- Appointed by: Tommy G. Thompson
- Preceded by: William G. Callow
- Succeeded by: Annette Ziegler

Chief Judge of the 6th District of Wisconsin Circuit Courts
- In office August 1, 1986 – July 31, 1992
- Appointed by: Nathan Heffernan
- Preceded by: David C. Willis (Acting); Frederick A. Fink
- Succeeded by: Dennis D. Conway

Wisconsin Circuit Court Judge for the Waushara Circuit
- In office August 1, 1979 – September 1992
- Preceded by: James Poole
- Succeeded by: Lewis R. Murach

Member of the Wisconsin State Assembly from the 72nd district
- In office January 1, 1973 – January 6, 1975
- Preceded by: Position Created
- Succeeded by: Patricia A. Goodrich

Member of the Wisconsin State Assembly from the Green Lake–Waushara district
- In office January 6, 1969 – January 1, 1973
- Preceded by: Franklin M. Jahnke
- Succeeded by: Position Abolished

Personal details
- Born: September 5, 1936 (age 90) Berlin, Wisconsin, U.S.
- Party: Republican
- Spouse: Jane Ann Heller
- Children: Jeffrey (died 2017); Jennifer (Weekly)
- Parents: Everett E. Wilcox (father); Irma Wilcox (mother)
- Education: Ripon College; University of Wisconsin Law School
- Profession: lawyer, judge

Military service
- Allegiance: United States
- Branch/service: United States Army; Military Police
- Years of service: 1959–1961
- Rank: 1st Lieutenant, USA

Jon P. Wilcox (born September 5, 1936) is an American lawyer and retired judge. He was a justice of the Wisconsin Supreme Court for 15 years, appointed by Governor Tommy G. Thompson in 1992 and leaving office in 2007. Prior to his time on the Supreme Court, he served for 13 years as a Wisconsin Circuit Court Judge, including seven years as Chief Judge of the 6th Judicial Administrative District of Wisconsin Circuit Courts. Earlier, he represented Green Lake and Waushara counties in the Wisconsin State Assembly as a Republican.

In the Fall of 2023, Wilcox was one of three former Wisconsin Supreme Court justices who advised Assembly speaker Robin Vos on the question of whether to impeach new justice Janet Protasiewicz. Wilcox released his opinion to the press on October 11, 2023, saying that he "did not see that there were any impeachable offenses."

== Early life and education ==
Wilcox was born at hospital in Berlin, Wisconsin, and grew up in nearby Wild Rose. He was valedictorian of his graduating class at Wild Rose High School in 1954, then attended Ripon College. After obtaining his bachelor's degree in 1958, he joined the United States Army and was commissioned as an officer in a military police company. In 1961, Wilcox left the Army and entered law school at the University of Wisconsin, ultimately obtaining his law degree in 1965.

Wilcox began in private law practice at the La Crosse, Wisconsin, firm of Steele, Smyth, Klos & Flynn. Wilcox would later refer to Jerry Klos as his mentor. After a few years in La Crosse, Wilcox and his wife purchased farmland near Wautoma and relocated there. In 1968, he formed his own law partnership, Wilcox, Rudolph, Kubasta & Rathjen.

== Wisconsin State Assembly ==
Also in 1968, Wilcox was approached to run for the Green Lake and Waushara seat in the Wisconsin State Assembly. He recognized politics as a good way to advance his law career, and decided to enter the race. He soundly defeated Republican primary opponents Scott P. Anger and Clifford D. Bvocik, then went on to win the general election without opposition.

In the Assembly, Wilcox would serve on the committees for elections, taxation, the judiciary, and insurance and banking, and served on a joint advisory committee on automobile accident liability. He served on the Governor's commissions on reapportionment and highway safety, and served on a special legislative committee on criminal penalties.

He ultimately served three terms in the Assembly, having been re-elected in 1970 and 1972. He did not seek re-election in 1974, facing pressure from his law partners to devote more time to the firm.

Though he left the legislature, Wilcox remained involved in politics. He served as Chairman of the Waushara County Republican Party from 1975 through 1979, and was the state co-chair of Ronald Reagan's 1976 presidential campaign. He was also an elected member of the Wisconsin Conservation Congress from 1975 to 1980.

== Wisconsin Circuit Court ==
Wilcox ultimately returned to public office in 1979 at the behest of Governor Martin J. Schreiber. Schreiber had appointed James Poole to the Waushara Circuit Court judgeship in 1978 after the death of Judge Boyd A. Clark, but Poole died unexpectedly on the day he filed to run for a full term in 1979. An aide to Schreiber asked Wilcox to consider running for the seat. Wilcox eventually decided to pursue election as a write-in candidate and was victorious in the April 1979 election. He would go on to be re-elected without opposition in 1985 and 1991.

Due to its small population, Wilcox was the only judge for Waushara County. He saw every state case in the county, for situations ranging from criminal prosecution to property or liability disputes. He served as chairman of the Wisconsin Sentencing Commission from 1987 to 1992. During his later years on the court, he also served as a faculty member of the Wisconsin Judicial College.

=== Chief Judge ===
In 1985, the Wisconsin Supreme Court appointed Wilcox Chief Judge of the 6th Administrative District of Wisconsin Circuit Courts, comprising, at the time, the counties of Adams, Clark, Columbia, Dodge, Green Lake, Juneau, Marquette, Portage, Sauk, Waushara, and Wood. As chief judge, he was empowered to assign judges, oversee the caseflow, and supervise the personnel and budget of the courts within his administrative district.

Wilcox served three two-year terms as chief judge, which at the time was the statutory maximum for consecutive terms. He was elected chairman of the Wisconsin Chief Judges Committee in 1990.

== Wisconsin Supreme Court ==
In May, 1992, Wisconsin Supreme Court Justice William G. Callow announced that he would resign, effective September 1. Wisconsin Governor Tommy Thompson selected Wilcox to fill the vacancy, and he was sworn in on October 7, 1992. The appointment would allow Wilcox to fill out the remainder of Callow's ten-year term, expiring in 1997.

Wilcox decided to stand for election to a full ten-year term in 1997, and faced ACLU attorney Walter Kelly. Wilcox won the election by a large margin, but his victory spawned allegations of campaign finance violations which would develop into a John Doe investigation.

=== 1997 election campaign controversy ===
Wilcox was involved in a controversy in 2001 when his 1997 re-election campaign was accused of an illegally coordinated get-out-the-vote effort with the group Wisconsin Coalition for Voter Participation. The group, which supported school choice, apparently put more than $200,000 into last-minute mailings and phone calls supporting Wilcox's candidacy. The Wisconsin State Elections Board alleged that Wilcox's campaign violated state election law, which bans any cooperation between independent groups and a candidate or a candidate's campaign organization.

The formal complaint alleged 10 violations of state election law, including accepting prohibited corporate contributions, filing false campaign reports, and failing to file reports of late contributions. Kelly, his opponent in the election, called on Wilcox to consider resignation.

The Board eventually reached a settlement with Wilcox's campaign, whereby a total of $60,000 in fines would be paid by members of the Wilcox campaign. At the time, this was the largest fine ever levied by the Wisconsin Elections Board. Although he denied knowing about the illegal coordination, Wilcox agreed to pay his $10,000 fine, and acknowledged that he bore the ultimate responsibility for the actions of his campaign staff. Wilcox's campaign manager, Mark Block, also paid a $15,000 fine and promised not to work as a consultant or volunteer on any campaign until 2004. The coalition's co-founder, former Assembly Republican staffer Brent Pickens, paid a $35,000 fine and promised not to work on any campaigns for the next five years.

Wilcox did not seek re-election in 2007. His term expired on July 31, 2007, and he was succeeded by Washington County Circuit Court Judge Annette K. Ziegler, who had defeated Madison attorney Linda Clifford in the April 2007 statewide election.

== Later years ==
After leaving the Supreme Court, Wilcox would continue to serve as a reserve judge, and would occasionally hear cases. He remained active in politics, endorsing a 2015 referendum to change the rules governing selection of the Wisconsin Supreme Court's Chief Justice, and was outspoken about the controversy roiling the Court subsequent to the amendment's passage. He endorsed Michael Screnock in the 2018 Supreme Court election, and Brian Hagedorn in 2019.

In the Fall of 2023, with a new liberal majority on the Wisconsin Supreme Court and pending litigation that threatened to overturn the Republican legislative maps, Wisconsin Assembly speaker Robin Vos began threatening to impeach the newest justice, Janet Protasiewicz. After initial pushback, he announced a plan to receive advice from three former justices on the question of impeachment. Wilcox was one of the three retired justices who advised Vos, the other two being former chief justice Patience Roggensack and former justice David Prosser Jr. Prosser's opinion was the first to become widely known, when an October 6 letter was revealed by the press on October 10, demonstrating Prosser making an extensive argument against any impeachment. Wilcox had previously denied that he had been asked to advise Vos, but the day after Prosser's letter was revealed, Wilcox also revealed his involvement in the panel. He also described his advice to Vos, telling the Wisconsin State Journal, "I told Vos that I did not favor impeachment. ... Impeachment is thrown around quite a bit today, but I did not see that there were any impeachable offenses at that time." Wilcox also told the Associated Press that impeachment should be reserved for "very serious things".

== Family and personal life ==
Wilcox married Jane Ann Heller, and together they had two children, Jeffrey Jon Wilcox and Jennifer Weekly. Jeffrey died in 2017 at age 53. Their daughter Jennifer has two children from her first marriage to Shawn Koerner.

Wilcox and his wife own a 2500-acre tree farm near Wautoma, Wisconsin. He enjoys hunting, fishing, and hiking.

== Electoral history ==
=== Wisconsin Assembly (1968, 1970, 1972) ===
Wisconsin Assembly, Green Lake–Waushara District Election, 1968
Party	Candidate	Votes	%	±%
Primary Election
Republican	Jon P. Wilcox	3,379	73.22%	
Republican	Scott P. Anger	725	15.71%	
Republican	Clifford D. Bvocik	511	11.07%	
Total votes		4,615	100.0%	
General Election
Republican	Jon P. Wilcox	10,618	100.0%	
Total votes		10,618	100.0%	
Republican hold				

Wisconsin Assembly, Green Lake–Waushara District Election, 1970
Party	Candidate	Votes	%	±%
General Election
Republican	Jon P. Wilcox (incumbent)	7,232	69.77%	
Democratic	James E. Schommer	3,133	30.23%	
Total votes		10,365	100.0%	
Republican hold				

Wisconsin Assembly, 72nd District Election, 1972
Party	Candidate	Votes	%	±%
General Election
Republican	Jon P. Wilcox	13,065	70.52%	
Democratic	Ricardo A. Gonzalez	5,315	28.69%	
American	Paul Treder	146	0.79%	
Total votes		18,526	100.0%	
Republican win (new seat)				

=== Wisconsin Circuit Court (1979, 1985, 1991) ===
Wisconsin Circuit Court, Waushara Circuit Election, 1979
Party	Candidate	Votes	%	±%
Nonpartisan	Jon P. Wilcox	2,818	80.19%	
Nonpartisan	James T. Barr	410	11.67%	
Nonpartisan	Richard Boelter	286	8.14%	
Total votes		3,514	100.0%	

Wisconsin Circuit Court, Waushara Circuit Election, 1985
Party	Candidate	Votes	%	±%
Nonpartisan	Jon P. Wilcox (incumbent)	3,053	100.0%	
Total votes		3,053	100.0%	

Wisconsin Circuit Court, Waushara Circuit Election, 1991
Party	Candidate	Votes	%	±%
Nonpartisan	Jon P. Wilcox (incumbent)	3,150	100.0%	
Total votes		3,150	100.0%	

=== Wisconsin Supreme Court (1997) ===
1997 Wisconsin Supreme Court election
Party	Candidate	Votes	%	±%
Nonpartisan	Jon P. Wilcox (incumbent)	476,900	62.07%	
Nonpartisan	Walter Kelly	291,463	37.93%	
Total votes		768,363	100.0%	

Wisconsin State Assembly
Preceded by Franklin M. Jahnke	Member of the Wisconsin State Assembly from the Green Lake–Waushara district January 6, 1969 – January 1, 1973	District abolished
District created	Member of the Wisconsin State Assembly from the 72nd district January 1, 1973 – January 6, 1975	Succeeded by Patricia A. Goodrich
Legal offices
Preceded by James Poole	Wisconsin Circuit Court Judge for the Waushara Circuit; August 1, 1979 – September 1992	Succeeded by Lewis R. Murach
Preceded by David C. Willis (Acting); Frederick A. Fink	Chief Judge of the 6th District of Wisconsin Circuit Courts; August 1, 1986 – July 31, 1992	Succeeded by Dennis D. Conway
Preceded by William G. Callow	Justice of the Wisconsin Supreme Court; October 8, 1992 – July 31, 2007	Succeeded by Annette Ziegler
