= David Prosser Jr. =

American politician and judge (1942–2024)

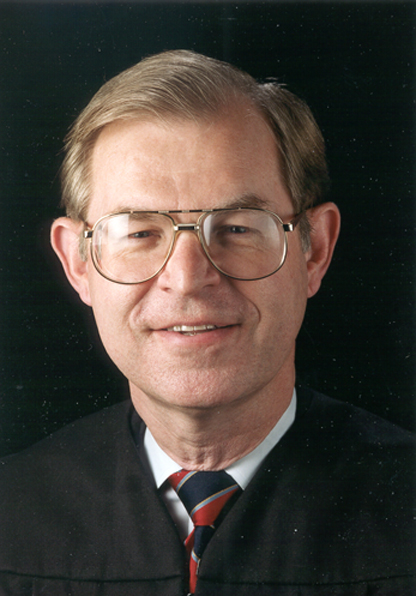
- Portrait, 2009

Justice of the Wisconsin Supreme Court
- In office September 10, 1998 – July 31, 2016
- Appointed by: Tommy Thompson
- Preceded by: Janine Geske
- Succeeded by: Daniel Kelly

Commissioner of the Wisconsin Tax Appeals Commission
- In office January 1997 – September 1998
- Appointed by: Tommy Thompson
- Preceded by: Joe Mettner
- Succeeded by: Thomas Boykoff

72nd Speaker of the Wisconsin State Assembly
- In office January 3, 1995 – January 3, 1997
- Preceded by: Walter Kunicki
- Succeeded by: Ben Brancel

Minority Leader of the Wisconsin State Assembly
- In office January 3, 1989 – January 3, 1995
- Preceded by: Betty Jo Nelsen
- Succeeded by: Walter Kunicki

Member of the Wisconsin State Assembly
- In office January 7, 1985 – January 3, 1997
- Preceded by: Heron Van Gorden
- Succeeded by: Steve Wieckert
- Constituency: 57th district
- In office January 3, 1983 – January 7, 1985
- Preceded by: Tommy Thompson
- Succeeded by: Joe Wineke
- Constituency: 79th district
- In office January 3, 1979 – January 3, 1983
- Preceded by: Tobias A. Roth
- Succeeded by: Harvey Stower
- Constituency: 42nd district

District Attorney of Outagamie County, Wisconsin
- In office January 1, 1977 – January 1, 1979
- Preceded by: Kenneth F. Rottier
- Succeeded by: William Drengler

Personal details
- Born: December 24, 1942 Chicago, Illinois, U.S.
- Died: December 1, 2024 (aged 81) Appleton, Wisconsin, U.S.
- Party: Republican
- Education: DePauw University (B.A.); University of Wisconsin Law School (J.D.)
- Profession: Lawyer

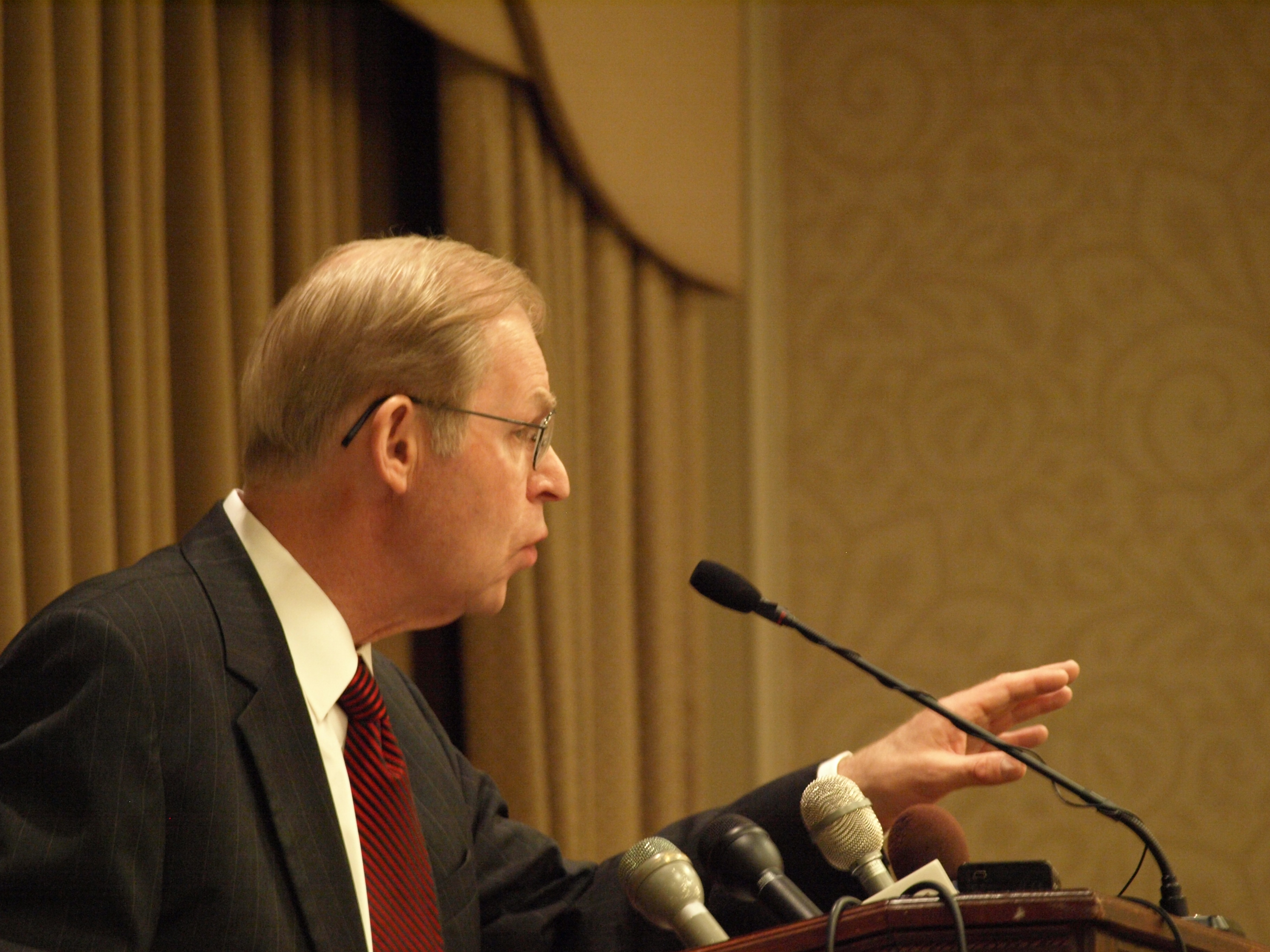
Prosser in March 2011

David Thomas Prosser Jr. (December 24, 1942 – December 1, 2024) was an American lawyer, jurist, and Republican politician from Appleton, Wisconsin. He was a justice of the Wisconsin Supreme Court from 1998 until his retirement in 2016. Prior to joining the court, he served as the 72nd speaker of the Wisconsin State Assembly, during the 1995–1996 term, after serving in the Assembly since 1979. Prior to becoming speaker, he led the Republican Assembly caucus for three terms as minority leader.

Earlier in his career, he worked as a congressional aide to U.S. Representative Harold V. Froehlich (R–WI), and served two years as district attorney of Outagamie County, Wisconsin, before his election to the Assembly.

After an unsuccessful bid for the U.S. House in 1996, Prosser was appointed by Wisconsin Governor Tommy Thompson to a vacant seat on the state tax appeals board, then in 1998 to a vacant seat on Wisconsin Supreme Court. He was elected to his first 10-year term without opposition in 2001. His re-election in 2011 came at a time of intense partisan attention on the Court, following the election of Republican Governor Scott Walker and litigation around his signature law, 2011 Wisconsin Act 10. Prosser narrowly won re-election in that race over Wisconsin assistant attorney general JoAnne Kloppenburg.

Prosser received national media attention in 2010 following verbal altercations with Chief Justice Shirley Abrahamson, and also in June 2011 when allegations were made of a physical altercation between Prosser and fellow justice Ann Walsh Bradley that occurred during court deliberations over 2011 Wisconsin Act 10. A special prosecutor investigated but declined to press criminal charges. An ethics action against Prosser was recommended by the Wisconsin Judicial Commission, however, after three other justices recused themselves from the matter, no further action was taken.

Prosser retired from the court in 2016, but returned to state affairs near the end of his life in the fall of 2023, when he was one of three former justices asked to advise Wisconsin Assembly speaker Robin Vos on the question of whether to impeach the then-newest justice, Janet Protasiewicz. Prosser publicly advised Vos to avoid impeachment, saying, "Impeachment is so serious, severe, and rare that it should not be considered unless the subject has committed a crime, or the subject has committed indisputable 'corrupt conduct' while 'in office.'"

== Early life and education ==
Prosser was born in Chicago to David T. Prosser Sr. and his wife Elizabeth (Patterson) Prosser. He was raised in Appleton, Wisconsin. After graduating from Appleton High School, he attended DePauw University, receiving his B.A. in 1965. He went on to law school at the University of Wisconsin and received his J.D. in 1968.

== Career ==
=== Early career ===
Prosser lectured at Indiana University-Indianapolis Law School from 1968 to 1969, before working from 1969 to 1972 in Washington, D.C., as an attorney advisor in the Office of Criminal Justice, U.S. Department of Justice. He ran unsuccessfully for a seat in the Wisconsin State Assembly in 1972, then served as an administrative assistant to U.S. Representative Harold Vernon Froehlich. Froehlich was a Republican and a former speaker of the Wisconsin State Assembly, serving his first term in the U.S. House of Representatives. As a member of the House Judiciary Committee during the Watergate impeachment hearings, in the 1973–1974 term, he was one of the few Republicans who voted in favor of impeaching Richard Nixon. Froehlich lost re-election in the Democratic wave of 1974. Prosser returned to Wisconsin and, after two years in private practice as a self-employed lawyer, he was elected Outagamie County district attorney in the 1976 election, serving from 1977 to 1978.

=== Wisconsin legislature ===
Prosser represented the Appleton area in the Wisconsin State Assembly as a Republican from 1979 through 1996. His committee assignments included Criminal Justice and Public Safety and Judiciary. During his tenure in the Assembly, he served six years as Minority leader and two years as Speaker.

In 1981, he opposed removing criminal penalties on sexual activity and cohabitation between unmarried, consulting adults, though he did express a willingness to repeal the jail terms. He stated that legalizing sex outside of marriage would increase divorce rates, the number of children born outside of wedlock, welfare payments, sexually transmitted diseases, and abortions. In 1995, while he was Assembly Speaker, Prosser led the push for the new baseball stadium for the Milwaukee Brewers, saying that Wisconsin had a choice of being either a "big league or bush league" state.

=== Campaign for U.S. Congress ===
In 1996 he ran for the 8th congressional district seat in the U.S. Congress vacated by retiring U.S. Representative Toby Roth. Prosser won what the Milwaukee Journal Sentinel described as a "bitter and high-spending" primary, but was defeated in the general election by Democrat Jay W. Johnson. One month later, Governor Thompson appointed Prosser to the Wisconsin Tax Appeals Commission where he conducted hearings and ruled on disputes related to state taxation.

=== Wisconsin Supreme Court ===
In September 1998, Thompson appointed Prosser to a vacant seat on the Wisconsin Supreme Court, hailing him as a conservative. In an unusual move, a bipartisan group of 77 of the 132 state legislators sent a letter to Thompson supporting the appointment, describing Prosser as, "learned, thoughtful, and fiercely defensive of our system of law".

In 2011, the Milwaukee Journal Sentinel said Prosser is a "reliable judicial conservative, but he's also independent", citing an August 2010 Wisconsin Law Journal analysis which concluded "Prosser voted with no justice more than 85% of the time, though he generally combined with three other conservative justices (Michael Gableman, Patience Roggensack, and Annette Ziegler), to form a 4-3 majority on the court." The New York Times said some observers believe that Prosser is a member of a conservative 4-3 bloc on the court.

In October 2010, Prosser indicated that he supported limiting free online access to Wisconsin trial court records because the information can be misused by employers and landlords, saying, "Some people are actually innocent, and they shouldn't be disadvantaged forever" by the online records. Opponents of the change argued that restricting free online access may result in private vendors selling the information, and may conflict with Wisconsin's open records law.

Following the decision in Donohoo v. Action Wisconsin Inc., Prosser voted to amend the state's judicial code of conduct to allow judges to decide cases involving their campaign contributors, saying there are various levels of support and a campaign contribution or endorsement "in and of itself does not create so close or special relationship so as to require automatic recusal." He has also said his policy is not to recuse himself from cases involving lawmakers he has served with in the past unless the case is actually about the lawmakers.

Prosser retired from the Wisconsin Supreme Court on July 31, 2016.

=== Other professional activities ===
Prosser served as a member of the Wisconsin Council of Criminal Justice (1980–1983), the Judicial Council Commission on Preliminary Examinations (1981), the Wisconsin Sentencing Commission (1984–1988, 1994–1995), the Wisconsin Sesquicentennial Commission (1993–1999), and the National Conference of Commissioners on Uniform State Laws (1983–1996).

== Controversies ==
=== Decision not to prosecute abuse case ===
In 1978, while serving as District Attorney of Outagamie County, Prosser declined to prosecute a Catholic priest accused of sexual abuse by two brothers (ages 12 and 14), who said the priest had touched their chests and unsuccessfully attempted to touch lower. Prosser later explained he did not file charges because the case was weak; it involved relatively new sexual assault laws that were untested at the time, and he did not think he could win a jury trial. He said he had assumed the priest, John Patrick Feeney, would be reassigned as a result of his discussion with Feeney's bishop. The priest was not removed from duties which allowed him contact with children, and he went on to abuse other children before being sent to prison on a 15-year sentence in 2004. The prosecutor who ultimately and successfully prosecuted the case in the early 2000s said that when Prosser had the case in the 1970s, he was lacking sufficient information: "We were able to gather a wealth of information that far exceeded what Prosser had," he said, adding, "It's not fair to second-guess him now." When interviewed in 2011 one of the victims said that in 1978 he and his brother had not communicated detailed information about the abuse to the authorities, and that when the case came to trial in 2002, Prosser helped in the prosecution.

During Prosser's 2011 run for re-election to the Wisconsin Supreme Court, the incident was revived in a political ad by a pro-union organization which claimed that Prosser did not investigate the abuse allegations and participated in a coverup. The ad was ultimately rated "Mostly False" by the fact-checking website, PolitiFact.com, which concluded that the ad omitted critical facts and created false impressions. One of the abuse victims, who had been critical of Prosser's decision not to prosecute, criticized the ad as "offensive, inaccurate and out of context." Prosser asked his opponent, Kloppenburg, to call for the removal of the ad—she replied that the First Amendment gave the group the right to run such ads.

=== 2002 legislative caucus scandal ===
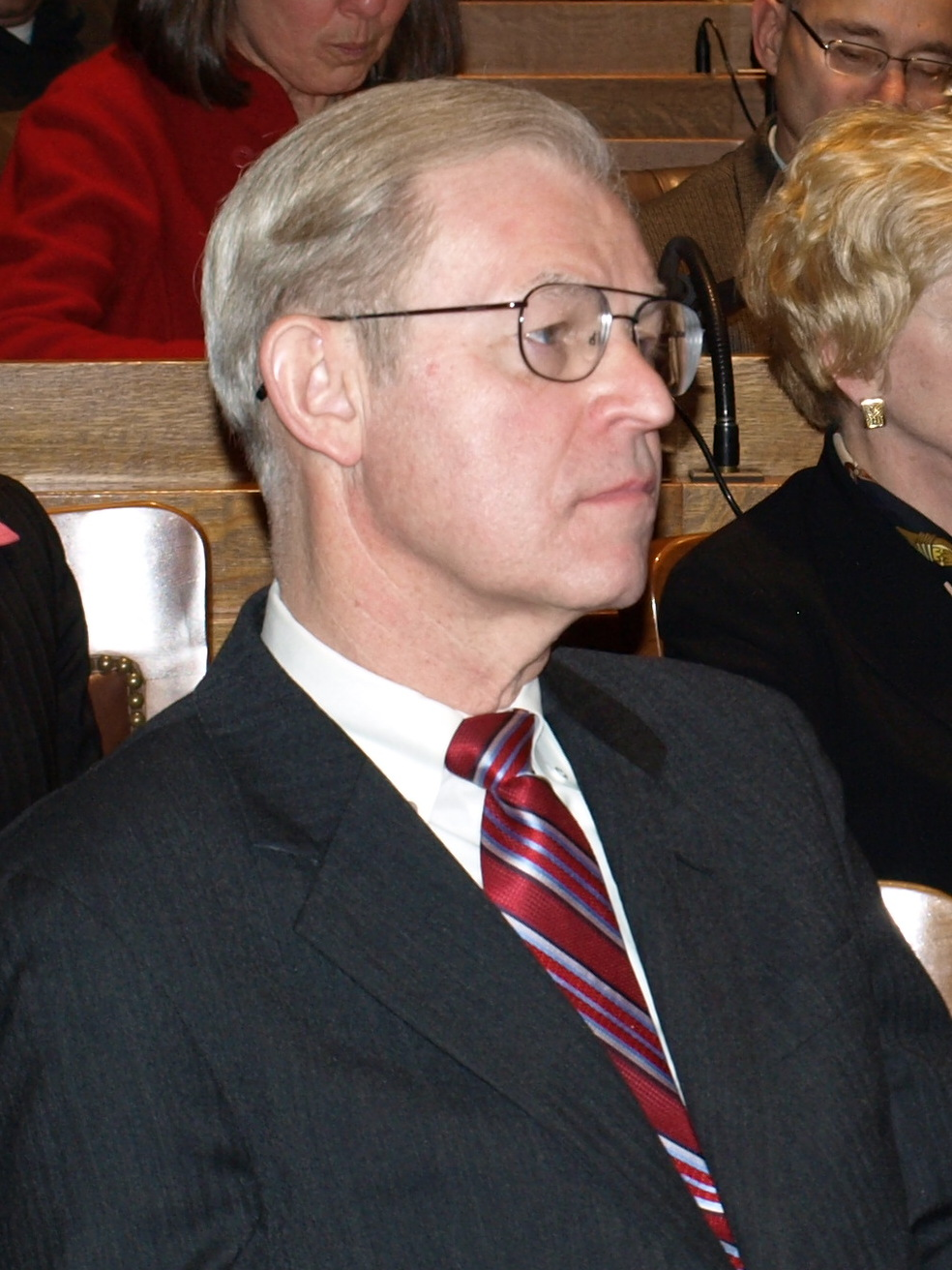
Prosser in February 2009

In 2006, Prosser testified on behalf of Wisconsin state representative Scott Jensen who was being tried on three felony counts of misconduct in office because his legislative staffers also performed campaign activity on his behalf. Prosser stated that during seven years of his own tenure in the Wisconsin Assembly, he had used his taxpayer-funded staff for campaigning—the same crime Jensen was eventually convicted of. Prosser was not charged, and defended the actions saying, "it was a different era and public expectations were quite different". However critics described this as illegal activity, and the Appleton Post Crescent, Prosser's hometown paper, found Prosser's admissions sufficient reason to endorse Prosser's opponent in the 2011 election, saying Prosser fell short of having the "unimpeachable integrity" required of a high court judge because he had admittedly "condoned illegal activity" while serving as an elected official.

=== Altercations with other justices ===
During a closed-door debate between the justices on February 10, 2010, Prosser called Chief Justice Shirley Abrahamson "a total bitch" and threatened to "destroy her". A review of emails by the Milwaukee Journal Sentinel indicated that "justices on both sides described the court as dysfunctional, and Prosser and others suggested bringing in a third party for help". The 2010 conflict on the court was also criticized as having a potential for lowering court productivity and distracting the focus of the justices. Prosser admitted he overreacted, but justified his statements, saying he had been goaded, bullied and abused by two other justices for a long time, and that the fights were caused by liberal members of the court "ganging up" on him and attempting to create a "foul atmosphere". He also said the March 2011 revelations of the year-old altercation were an attempt to hurt his bid for re-election. When interviewed in March 2011, Justice Ann Walsh Bradley acknowledged Prosser had had outbursts over the years, but said there had not been one of significant magnitude since February 2010. She also commented that, "he is a good man - but you cannot accurately say he has a steady, even temperament."

Conflicting media reports on June 25, 2011 indicated that Prosser had gotten into an altercation with Bradley on June 13, 2011 in her office, which allegedly became physical. The dispute occurred during a discussion in Bradley's office with four other Justices present, before the court issued its June 13, 2011 split decision to uphold the law limiting collective bargaining rights for most Wisconsin state public employees. In one report, witnesses alleged that after Bradley told Prosser to leave her office, Prosser grabbed Bradley around the neck in what was described as a chokehold. Prosser claimed that Bradley charged Prosser with her fist raised, and that in attempting to block her, he made contact with her neck. Capitol Police Chief Charles Tubbs was notified of the incident, and met with the entire Supreme Court. Investigations into the matter were opened by the Wisconsin Judicial Commission and the Dane County Sheriff's office. After initially saying he would refrain from comment until a proper investigation was completed, Prosser denied he choked Bradley saying, "claims made to the media will be proven false." Bradley then made a public statement saying that Prosser, "put his hands around my neck in anger in a chokehold", as she was asking him to leave her office.

The Dane County Sheriff's office gave its findings to county District Attorney Ismael Ozanne, who referred the matter to special prosecutor Patricia Barrett; Barrett ultimately ruled in late August 2011 that the circumstances and evidence reviewed did not support the filing of criminal charges. On March 16, 2012, the Wisconsin Judicial Commission filed an ethics complaint against Prosser, "recommending that the court discipline him for alleged misconduct", however, three conservative members of the court recused themselves from the matter, with the result that no quorum existed, and no decision could be made.

=== Failure to recuse during "John Doe" probe of Scott Walker ===
Leaked files obtained by the Guardian revealed that a network of dark money groups spent $3.5 million to pay for TV and radio ads backing the judge during his 2011 campaign. According to these leaked emails "The push was seen as vital, the documents disclose, as a means of retaining the rightwing majority of the court and thereby preserving the anti-union measures introduced by Walker. 'If we lose [Justice Prosser], the Walker agenda is toast,' one ally writes in an email sent around to the governor’s chief of staff and several conservative lobbyists." In 2015, a John Doe probe into Scott Walker's funding sources during the 2012 recall campaign against him involved the same set groups that funded Prosser's 2011 campaign. Despite the obvious possible conflicts of interest, Prosser refused to recuse himself, ultimately casting the deciding vote to terminate the probe. Prosser told the Guardian that four years had passed since his re-election before he joined the decision to close the John Doe investigation, over which time any potential conflict of interest had faded.

=== Advising Republican leadership regarding impeachment ===
In fall 2023, Prosser was included in a special panel to advise Wisconsin Assembly speaker Robin Vos on the question of impeaching the newest Wisconsin Supreme Court justice, Janet Protasiewicz. This followed several weeks of acrimony as Vos threatened impeachment to prevent the justice from participating in pending redistricting cases. Prosser's opinion on the matter became known through an October 6 letter to the speaker, which read:

Section 1 of Article VII states that before the trial of impeachment, "the members of the court [Senate] shall take an oath or affirmation truly and impartially to try impeachment according to evidence." In my view, there is no assurance that two-thirds of the present "court" would be convinced that they are bound "impartially" by the "evidence" to vote for impeachment. Once again, the "evidence" has to persuade members of the court... and a large percentage of the public... that impeachment is legitimate. Impeachment that appears to be solely partisan will likely backfire.

Even if a Supreme Court Justice were impeached and convicted, the governor would promptly name a successor who might be more problematic.

The Constitution also provides that "no judicial officer shall exercise his [or her] office, after he [or she] shall be impeached, until his [or her] acquittal." To impeach a justice solely to delay a case or cases will be viewed as unreasonable partisan politics.

To sum up my views, there should be no effort to impeach Justice Protasiewicz on anything we know now. Impeachment is so serious, severe, and rare that it should not be considered unless the subject has committed a crime, or the subject has committed indisputable "corrupt conduct" while "in office."

== 2011 re-election campaign ==
Prosser faced JoAnne Kloppenburg, a long-time but little-known Wisconsin assistant attorney general, in both the February 5, 2011, spring primary, and the April 5 run-off election.

=== Primary election ===
In December 2010, Prosser's campaign director expressed strong support for governor-elect Walker, saying Prosser's "personal ideology more closely mirrors" Walker's, and that a win by Prosser would result in, "protecting the conservative judicial majority and acting as a common sense complement to both the new administration and Legislature." He later disavowed the statements and claimed he had not seen the release. Prosser's campaign manager also said that, "This election is about a 4-3 commonsense conservative majority vs. a 3-4 liberal majority, and nothing more."

In a survey of attorneys conducted by the Milwaukee Bar Association that was published February 2011, Prosser received more votes saying he was "qualified" than any of his opponents; besting Kloppenburg by a margin of 296 to 112. He was endorsed in the Milwaukee Journal Sentinel, and the Sun Prairie Star. He won the primary handily, receiving 231,000 votes to second-place finisher Kloppenburg's 105,000 votes; a 30% margin.

=== General election ===
In the general election of April 5, 2011, Prosser again faced Kloppenburg. The contest received considerable attention due to the 2011 Wisconsin protests of Walker's budget repair bill and limitations on public employee bargaining rights; issues which would likely soon come before the Wisconsin Supreme Court. Kloppenburg supporters attempted to tie Prosser to the policies of Republican governor Scott Walker, and his March 2011 law limiting most of Wisconsin's public employees' collective bargaining rights. The non-partisan race for the court seat was also characterized as a proxy battle or referendum on the administration of Governor Walker and other Republican officials. Both candidates stated their unhappiness regarding the increased partisan aspect of the race, with Prosser claiming that if he was defeated, it would mean the end of judicial independence.

On March 31, Prosser's campaign co-chair, former Democratic governor Patrick Lucey, resigned from the campaign and endorsed Kloppenburg, saying it appeared that Prosser had lost his impartiality, and was showing "a disturbing distemper and lack of civility that does not bode well for the High Court".

The Wausau Daily Herald reversed its primary election endorsement, and urged its readers to vote against Prosser in the general, describing him as "an intemperate figure given to partisan rhetoric". Citing the earlier statement of Prosser's campaign director that the election is about maintaining a conservative majority on the court, The Capital Times endorsed Kloppenburg. Prosser was endorsed by the Sun Prairie Star, The Milwaukee Journal-Sentinel, and former Alaska governor Sarah Palin (via Twitter), among others for the general election.

State officials predicted a voter turnout of around 20 percent, a typical level of turnout for an April election. However, voter interest and turnout were unusually high with nearly 1.5 million votes cast.

=== Result ===
The day after the election, Kloppenburg was thought to be ahead by a razor-thin margin of 204-votes, leading her to prematurely declare victory. Late in the afternoon of April 7, Waukesha County Clerk Kathy Nickolaus announced that the preliminary vote totals she had given to the Associated Press on April 6 did not include 14,315 votes from Brookfield, her county's second largest city and one of the most Republican. The announcement changed the unofficial total, giving Prosser a lead of over 7,000 votes which likely would not be changed by a recount. Other, much smaller errors in the preliminary count were found in other counties favoring both candidates. A final vote canvass of all the counties in Wisconsin gave Prosser an official lead of 7,316 votes on April 15. Kloppenburg did request a recount at taxpayer expense (costing as much as $500,000) and Prosser was eventually declared the winner by 7,006 votes.

New York Times analyst Nate Silver declared on April 8 that Nickolaus' error pointed to incompetence, not conspiracy. However, Democrats called on Nickolaus to resign, citing her previous employment under Prosser in the mid-1990s as a member of the assembly caucus and questions about her procedures and counts in prior elections. State election officials announced an investigation of possible voting irregularities going back to 2006.

== Death ==
Prosser died of cancer at Rennes Health Care Center in Appleton, on December 1, 2024.

== Electoral history ==
=== Wisconsin Assembly, 42nd district (1972) ===
Year	Election	Date	Elected				Defeated				Total	Plurality
1972	Primary	Sep. 12	Tobias A. Roth	Republican	2,648	37.10%	David T. Prosser Jr.	Rep.	3,256	39.38%	8,268	1,127
1972	Primary	Sep. 12	Tobias A. Roth	Republican	2,648	37.10%	Norman Austin	Rep.	402	4.86%	8,268	1,127
1972	Primary	Sep. 12	Tobias A. Roth	Republican	2,648	37.10%	Neal W. Wellman	Rep.	227	2.75%	8,268	1,127

=== Wisconsin Assembly, 42nd district (1978–1980) ===
Year	Election	Date	Elected				Defeated				Total	Plurality
1978	Primary	Sep. 12	David T. Prosser Jr.	Republican	3,822	69.40%	Arnold E. Grummer	Rep.	1,685	30.60%	5,507	2,137
1978	General	Nov. 7	David T. Prosser Jr.	Republican	9,991	66.10%	James F. Schreiter	Dem.	5,124	33.90%	15,115	4,867
1980	General	Nov. 4	David T. Prosser Jr. (inc)	Republican	13,881	100.0%	--unopposed--				13,881	

=== Wisconsin Assembly, 79th district (1982) ===
Year	Election	Date	Elected				Defeated				Total	Plurality
1982	General	Nov. 2	David T. Prosser Jr.	Republican	10,855	67.89%	David N. Innis	Dem.	5,135	32.11%	15,990	5,720

=== Wisconsin Assembly, 57th district (1984–1994) ===
Year	Election	Date	Elected				Defeated				Total	Plurality
1984	General	Nov. 6	David T. Prosser Jr.	Republican	16,728	100.0%	--unopposed--				16,728	
1986	General	Nov. 4	David T. Prosser Jr. (inc)	Republican	12,001	73.66%	Kathleen P. Hartman	Dem.	4,291	26.34%	16,292	7,710
1988	General	Nov. 8	David T. Prosser Jr. (inc)	Republican	16,280	72.82%	Kathleen P. Hartman	Dem.	6,077	27.18%	22,357	10,203
1990	General	Nov. 6	David T. Prosser Jr. (inc)	Republican	11,342	68.80%	Michael Meyer	Dem.	5,144	31.20%	16,486	6,198
1992	General	Nov. 3	David T. Prosser Jr. (inc)	Republican	16,392	67.79%	Michael Meyer	Dem.	7,790	32.21%	24,182	8,602
1994	General	Nov. 8	David T. Prosser Jr. (inc)	Republican	12,277	100.0%	--unopposed--				12,277	

=== U.S. House (1996) ===
Wisconsin's 8th Congressional District Election, 1996
Party	Candidate	Votes	%	±%
Republican Primary, September 10, 1996
Republican	David Prosser	29,679	57.62%	
Republican	Chuck Dettman	21,832	42.38%	
Plurality		7,847	15.23%	
Total votes		51,511	100.0%	
General Election, November 5, 1996
Democratic	Jay W. Johnson	129,551	52.04%	+15.78pp
Republican	David Prosser	119,398	47.96%	−15.74pp
	Scattering	208	0.08%	
Plurality		10,153	4.07%	-23.37pp
Total votes		249,157	100.0%	+38.84%
Democratic gain from Republican				

=== Wisconsin Supreme Court (2001, 2011) ===
2001 Wisconsin Supreme Court election
Party	Candidate	Votes	%	±%
General Election, April 3, 2001
Nonpartisan	David T. Prosser Jr. (incumbent)	549,860	99.53%	
	Scattering	2,569	0.47%	
Total votes		552,429	100.0%	-32.45%

2011 Wisconsin Supreme Court election
Party	Candidate	Votes	%	±%
Nonpartisan Primary, February 15, 2011
Nonpartisan	David T. Prosser Jr. (incumbent)	231,017	54.99%	
Nonpartisan	JoAnne Kloppenburg	105,002	24.99%	
Nonpartisan	Marla Stephens	45,256	10.77%	
Nonpartisan	Joel Winnig	37,831	9.01%	
	Scattering	1,004	0.24%	
Total votes		420,110	100.0%	
General Election, April 5, 2011
Nonpartisan	David T. Prosser Jr. (incumbent)	752,323	50.19%	
Nonpartisan	JoAnne Kloppenburg	745,007	49.70%	
	Scattering	1,550	0.10%	
Plurality		7,316	0.49%	
Total votes		1,498,880	100.0%	+88.81%
General Election Recount, May 20, 2011
Nonpartisan	David T. Prosser Jr. (incumbent)	752,694	50.18%	
Nonpartisan	JoAnne Kloppenburg	745,690	49.71%	
	Scattering	1,729	0.12%	
Plurality		7,004	0.47%	
Total votes		1,500,113	100.0%	+88.96%

Wisconsin State Assembly
Preceded by Tobias A. Roth	Member of the Wisconsin State Assembly from the 42nd district 1979–1983	Succeeded by Harvey Stower
Preceded by Tommy Thompson	Member of the Wisconsin State Assembly from the 79th district 1983–1985	Succeeded by Joe Wineke
Preceded by Heron Van Gorden	Member of the Wisconsin State Assembly from the 57th district 1985–1997	Succeeded by Steve Wieckert
Preceded by Betty Jo Nelsen	Minority Leader of the Wisconsin State Assembly; 1989–1995	Succeeded by Walter Kunicki
Preceded by Walter Kunicki	Speaker of the Wisconsin State Assembly; 1995–1997	Succeeded by Ben Brancel
Legal offices
Preceded by Kenneth F. Rottier	District Attorney of Outagamie County, Wisconsin; 1977–1979	Succeeded by William Drengler
Preceded by Janine Geske	Justice of the Wisconsin Supreme Court; 1998–2016	Succeeded by Daniel Kelly
