= 2022 Wisconsin Attorney General election =

- November 8, 2022
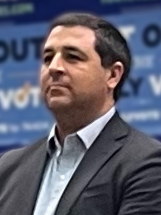

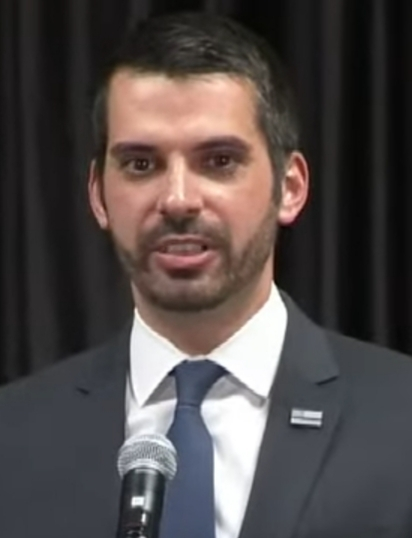
Nominee	Josh Kaul	Eric Toney
Party	Democratic	Republican
Popular vote	1,333,369	1,298,369
Percentage	50.64%	49.31%
- Kaul: 40–50% 50–60% 60–70% 70–80% 80–90% >90% Toney: 50–60% 60–70% 70–80% 80–90% >90% Tie: 40–50% 50% No data
Attorney General before election
Josh Kaul
Democratic
Elected Attorney General
Josh Kaul
Democratic

The 2022 Wisconsin Attorney General election took place on November 8, 2022, to elect the Attorney General of Wisconsin. Incumbent Democratic Attorney General Josh Kaul won re-election to a second term by a 1.33% margin. Party nominees were selected in a partisan primary on August 9, 2022.

== Democratic primary ==
=== Candidates ===
==== Nominee ====
- Josh Kaul, incumbent attorney general

=== Endorsements ===
Josh Kaul

Organizations

- Fair Wisconsin
- Giffords
- Human Rights Campaign PAC
- NARAL Pro-Choice America

Labor unions

- American Federation of Teachers Local 212
- Teamsters Joint Council 39
- United Auto Workers
- Wisconsin AFL–CIO

=== Results ===
Democratic primary results
Party	Candidate	Votes	%
Democratic	Josh Kaul (incumbent)	461,024	100.0%
Total votes		461,024	100.0%

== Republican primary ==
=== Candidates ===
==== Nominee ====
- Eric Toney, Fond du Lac County prosecutor

==== Eliminated in primary ====
- Adam Jarchow, former member of the Wisconsin State Assembly (2015–2019)
- Karen Mueller, attorney and candidate for Wisconsin's 3rd congressional district in 2014

==== Withdrew ====
- Ryan Owens, University of Wisconsin–Madison law professor (endorsed Jarchow)

==== Declined ====
- Jake Curtis, attorney and Wisconsin Air National Guard first lieutenant (endorsed Jarchow)

=== Endorsements ===
Adam Jarchow

U.S. Representatives

- Tom Tiffany, U.S. Representative for Wisconsin's 7th congressional district

State legislators

- Dave Craig, former state senator
- Joe Handrick, former state assemblyman
- Treig Pronschinske, state assemblyman
- John Spiros, state assemblyman
- Tom Weatherston, former state assemblyman
- 29 other state legislators

Sheriffs

- 12 sheriffs

Police chiefs

- 15 police chiefs

Local officials

- Kirk Anderson, mayor of St. Croix Falls
- Joanne Laufenberg, Walworth County supervisor
- Jeff Vollenweider, mayor of Kewaunee
- Taylor Wishau, Racine County supervisor

Organizations

- Americans for Prosperity-Wisconsin
- NRA Political Victory Fund
- Wisconsin Right to Life (co-endorsed with Toney)
- Wisconsin Young Republicans

Individuals

- Ted Nugent, singer
Ryan Owens (withdrawn)

Federal officials

- Paul Clement, former Solicitor General of the United States (2004–2008)

State Supreme Court Justices

- Michael Gableman, former justice (2008–2018)
- Dan Kelly, former Wisconsin Supreme Court justice (2016–2020)
- ~~David Prosser, former justice (1998–2016)~~ (switched endorsement to Toney after Owens withdrew)
- Jon Wilcox, former justice (1992–2007)

State executive officials

- Margaret Farrow, former Lieutenant Governor of Wisconsin (2001–2003)

Speakers of the Wisconsin Assembly

- ~~Ben Brancel, former speaker of the assembly (1997–1999)~~ (switched endorsement to Toney after Owens withdrew)
- ~~John Gard, former speaker of the assembly (2003–2007)~~ (switched endorsement to Toney after Owens withdrew)
- ~~Michael Huebsch, former speaker of the assembly (2007–2009)~~ (switched endorsement to Toney after Owens withdrew)

State legislators

- 21 state legislators

Sheriffs

- Eric Severson, Waukesha County sheriff
Eric Toney

U.S. Representatives

- Glenn Grothman, U.S. Representative from Wisconsin's 6th congressional district

State Supreme Court Justices

- David Prosser, former justice (1998–2016) (previously endorsed Owens)

State legislators

- 25 state legislators

District attorneys

- 36 district attorneys

Local officials

- Steve Abel, Fond du Lac County board chairman
- Allen Buechel, Fond du Lac County county executive
- Jonathan Delgrave, Racine County county executive
- John Doemel, Winnebago County county executive
- Sam Kaufman, Fond du Lac County county executive

Sheriffs

- 49 sheriffs

Police chiefs

- 19 police chiefs

Individuals

- Brad Courtney, former chairman of the Republican Party of Wisconsin

Organizations

- Milwaukee Police Association
- Racine Police Association
- Wisconsin Fraternal Order of Police
- Wisconsin Right to Life (co-endorsed with Jarchow)
Declined to endorse

Organizations

- Republican Party of Wisconsin

=== Debate and virtual town hall ===
2022 Wisconsin Attorney General Republican primary debate and virtual town hall
No.	Date	Host	Moderator	Link	Republican	Republican	Republican
Key: P Participant A Absent N Not invited I Invited W Withdrawn							
Key: P Participant A Absent N Not invited I Invited W Withdrawn					Eric Toney	Adam Jarchow	Karen Mueller
1	Jul. 20, 2022	WISN (AM)	Dan O'Donnell		P	P	P
2	Aug. 3, 2022	Wisconsin Manufacturers & Commerce	Scott Manley	YouTube	P	P	A

=== Results ===
Results by county Toney: 30–40%; 40–50%; 60–70%; Jarchow: 30–40%; 40–50%; 60–70%; Mueller: 30–40%; 40–50%

Republican primary results
Party	Candidate	Votes	%
Republican	Eric Toney	222,902	37.43%
Republican	Adam Jarchow	220,045	36.95%
Republican	Karen Mueller	152,581	25.62%
Total votes		595,528	100.0%

== General election ==
=== Debates ===
2022 Wisconsin Attorney General debates
No.	Date	Host	Moderator	Link	Democratic	Republican
Key: P Participant A Absent N Not invited I Invited W Withdrawn						
Key: P Participant A Absent N Not invited I Invited W Withdrawn					Josh Kaul	Eric Toney
1	Oct. 27, 2022	State Bar of Wisconsin; Wispolitics.com; WISC-TV	Eric Franke	YouTube	P	P
2	Oct. 27, 2022	WISN-TV	Matt Smith	YouTube (Part 1); YouTube (Part 2); YouTube (Part 3); YouTube (Part 4); YouTube	P	P

=== Predictions ===
Source	Ranking	As of
Sabato's Crystal Ball	Tossup	November 3, 2022
Elections Daily	Leans R (flip)	November 7, 2022

=== Polling ===
Poll source	Date(s) administered	Sample size (Note: Key: A – all adults RV – registered voters LV – likely voters V – unclear)	Margin of error	Josh Kaul (D)	Eric Toney (R)	Undecided
The Trafalgar Group (R)	November 2–4, 2022	1,095 (LV)	± 2.9%	47%	50%	3%

=== Results ===
2022 Wisconsin Attorney General election
Party	Candidate	Votes	%	±%
Democratic	Josh Kaul (incumbent)	1,333,369	50.64%	+1.23%
Republican	Eric Toney	1,298,369	49.31%	+0.55%
Write-in		1,539	0.06%	+0.01%
Total votes		2,633,277	100.00%	N/A
Democratic hold				

==== By county ====
County	Josh Kaul Democratic		Eric Toney Republican		Write-in Various		Margin		Total votes cast
County	#	%	#	%	#	%	#	%	Total votes cast
Adams	3,820	38.85%	6,004	61.07%	8	0.08%	−2,184	−22.21%	9,832
Ashland	3,934	57.01%	2,961	42.91%	5	0.07%	973	14.10%	6,900
Barron	7,490	37.31%	12,578	62.65%	9	0.04%	−5,088	−25.34%	20,077
Bayfield	5,238	56.84%	3,974	43.12%	4	0.04%	1,264	13.72%	9,216
Brown	53,165	46.96%	59,968	52.97%	80	0.07%	−6,803	−6.01%	113,213
Buffalo	2,432	39.96%	3,653	60.02%	1	0.02%	−1,221	−20.06%	6,086
Burnett	2,877	35.22%	5,291	64.78%	0	0.00%	−2,414	−29.55%	8,168
Calumet	9,953	40.14%	14,834	59.82%	9	0.04%	−4,881	−19.68%	24,796
Chippewa	12,252	42.29%	16,709	57.67%	12	0.04%	−4,457	−15.38%	28,973
Clark	3,927	33.91%	7,649	66.05%	5	0.04%	−3,722	−32.14%	11,581
Columbia	13,381	49.46%	13,655	50.47%	19	0.07%	−274	−1.01%	27,055
Crawford	3,461	49.71%	3,500	50.27%	1	0.01%	−39	−0.56%	6,962
Dane	229,828	76.94%	68,665	22.99%	228	0.08%	161,163	53.95%	298,721
Dodge	13,214	34.16%	25,464	65.84%	0	0.00%	−12,250	−31.67%	38,678
Door	8,920	51.82%	8,286	48.14%	7	0.04%	634	3.68%	17,213
Douglas	10,324	55.88%	8,138	44.05%	12	0.06%	2,186	11.83%	18,474
Dunn	8,245	44.93%	10,107	55.07%	0	0.00%	−1,862	−10.15%	18,352
Eau Claire	27,853	57.93%	20,196	42.00%	32	0.07%	7,657	15.93%	48,081
Florence	643	25.64%	1,865	74.36%	0	0.00%	−1,222	−48.72%	2,508
Fond du Lac	16,159	35.01%	29,998	64.99%	4	0.01%	−13,839	−29.98%	46,161
Forest	1,539	37.11%	2,608	62.89%	0	0.00%	−1,069	−25.78%	4,147
Grant	8,675	43.61%	11,202	56.31%	15	0.08%	−2,527	−12.70%	19,892
Green	9,000	51.85%	8,354	48.12%	5	0.03%	646	3.72%	17,359
Green Lake	2,796	32.32%	5,850	67.62%	5	0.06%	−3,054	−35.30%	8,651
Iowa	6,621	57.28%	4,935	42.69%	4	0.03%	1,686	14.58%	11,560
Iron	1,252	38.63%	1,989	61.37%	0	0.00%	−737	−22.74%	3,241
Jackson	3,589	45.05%	4,377	54.95%	0	0.00%	−788	−9.89%	7,966
Jefferson	16,306	42.53%	22,015	57.42%	19	0.05%	−5,709	−14.89%	38,340
Juneau	3,867	36.13%	6,829	63.80%	7	0.07%	−2,962	−27.67%	10,703
Kenosha	31,808	48.63%	33,553	51.30%	45	0.07%	−1,745	−2.67%	65,406
Kewaunee	3,602	36.52%	6,259	63.47%	1	0.01%	−2,657	−26.94%	9,862
La Crosse	31,849	58.26%	22,789	41.68%	32	0.06%	9,060	16.57%	54,670
Lafayette	2,818	43.17%	3,710	56.83%	0	0.00%	−892	−13.66%	6,528
Langlade	3,055	34.04%	5,920	65.96%	0	0.00%	−2,865	−31.92%	8,975
Lincoln	5,360	40.15%	7,986	59.82%	4	0.03%	−2,626	−19.67%	13,350
Manitowoc	14,294	40.15%	21,282	59.78%	26	0.07%	−6,988	−19.63%	35,602
Marathon	25,339	41.33%	35,958	58.64%	18	0.03%	−10,619	−17.32%	61,315
Marinette	6,219	33.73%	12,206	66.19%	15	0.08%	−5,987	−32.47%	18,440
Marquette	2,595	35.61%	4,690	64.35%	3	0.04%	−2,095	−28.75%	7,288
Menominee	938	77.84%	267	22.16%	0	0.00%	671	55.68%	1,205
Milwaukee	241,620	70.33%	101,577	29.57%	372	0.11%	140,043	40.76%	343,569
Monroe	7,016	40.62%	10,244	59.31%	11	0.06%	−3,228	−18.69%	17,271
Oconto	6,038	31.11%	13,361	68.85%	7	0.04%	−7,323	−37.74%	19,406
Oneida	8,771	43.57%	11,347	56.37%	13	0.06%	−2,576	−12.80%	20,131
Outagamie	39,217	46.03%	45,975	53.97%	0	0.00%	−6,758	−7.93%	85,192
Ozaukee	22,278	42.81%	29,727	57.12%	34	0.07%	−7,449	−14.31%	52,039
Pepin	1,275	38.69%	2,020	61.31%	0	0.00%	−745	−22.61%	3,295
Pierce	7,787	43.31%	10,184	56.64%	9	0.05%	−2,397	−13.33%	17,980
Polk	7,406	36.26%	13,021	63.74%	0	0.00%	−5,615	−27.49%	20,427
Portage	17,859	53.62%	15,430	46.33%	17	0.05%	2,429	7.29%	33,306
Price	2,678	38.13%	4,345	61.87%	0	0.00%	−1,667	−23.74%	7,023
Racine	37,788	46.64%	43,145	53.26%	81	0.10%	−5,357	−6.61%	81,014
Richland	3,245	46.52%	3,724	53.39%	6	0.09%	−479	−6.87%	6,975
Rock	35,901	55.75%	28,450	44.18%	47	0.07%	7,451	11.57%	64,398
Rusk	2,280	35.81%	4,084	64.14%	3	0.05%	−1,804	−28.33%	6,367
Sauk	14,705	51.26%	13,981	48.74%	0	0.00%	724	2.52%	28,686
Sawyer	3,634	42.63%	4,884	57.29%	7	0.08%	−1,250	−14.66%	8,525
Shawano	5,933	33.25%	11,909	66.75%	0	0.00%	−5,976	−33.49%	17,842
Sheboygan	21,987	41.52%	30,937	58.42%	36	0.07%	−8,950	−16.90%	52,960
St. Croix	17,910	40.94%	25,815	59.01%	20	0.05%	−7,905	−18.07%	43,745
Taylor	2,460	28.46%	6,183	71.54%	0	0.00%	−3,723	−43.08%	8,643
Trempealeau	5,259	43.12%	6,928	56.81%	8	0.07%	−1,669	−13.69%	12,195
Vernon	6,622	50.58%	6,460	49.35%	9	0.07%	162	1.24%	13,091
Vilas	5,098	38.77%	8,053	61.23%	0	0.00%	−2,955	−22.47%	13,151
Walworth	17,989	39.42%	27,623	60.53%	26	0.06%	−9,634	−21.11%	45,638
Washburn	3,144	37.79%	5,172	62.17%	3	0.04%	−2,028	−24.38%	8,319
Washington	22,205	30.19%	51,344	69.81%	0	0.00%	−29,139	−39.62%	73,549
Waukesha	84,882	38.23%	137,012	61.71%	119	0.05%	−52,130	−23.48%	222,013
Waupaca	8,076	34.97%	15,009	64.99%	8	0.03%	−6,933	−30.02%	23,093
Waushara	3,775	33.54%	7,480	66.46%	0	0.00%	−3,705	−32.92%	11,255
Winnebago	36,119	48.88%	37,718	51.04%	57	0.08%	−1,599	−2.16%	73,894
Wood	13,774	42.07%	18,953	57.89%	11	0.03%	−5,179	−15.82%	32,738
Totals	1,333,369	50.64%	1,298,369	49.31%	1,539	0.06%	35,000	1.33%	2,633,277

Counties that flipped from Democratic to Republican

- Columbia (largest city: Portage)
- Crawford (largest city: Prairie du Chien)
- Kenosha (largest city: Kenosha)

Counties that flipped from Republican to Democratic

- Door (largest city: Sturgeon Bay)

==== By congressional district ====
Despite losing the state, Toney won six of eight congressional districts.

District	Kaul	Toney	Representative
1st	49%	51%	Bryan Steil
2nd	72%	28%	Mark Pocan
3rd	49.5%	50.4%	Ron Kind (117th Congress)
3rd	49.5%	50.4%	Derrick Van Orden (118th Congress)
4th	77%	23%	Gwen Moore
5th	38%	62%	Scott L. Fitzgerald
6th	42%	58%	Glenn Grothman
7th	41%	59%	Tom Tiffany
8th	43%	57%	Mike Gallagher

== See also ==
- Wisconsin Attorney General
