= 1997 Wisconsin Supreme Court election =

- April 1, 1997

| Candidate | Jon P. Wilcox | Walter Kelly |
| Popular vote | 476,900 | 291,463 |
| Percentage | 62.07% | 37.93% |
- Wilcox: 50–60% 60–70% 70–80% 80–90%
Justice before election
Jon P. Wilcox
Elected Justice
Jon P. Wilcox

The 1997 Wisconsin Supreme Court election was held on April 1, 1997, to elect a justice to the Wisconsin Supreme Court. The incumbent justice, Jon P. Wilcox (who had been appointed in 1992 to fill a vacancy created by the retirement of William G. Callow) was elected to a full ten-year term, defeating challenger Walter Kelly.

== Results ==
1997 Wisconsin Supreme Court election
| Party | Candidate | Votes | % |
|---|---|---|---|
| Nonpartisan | Jon P. Wilcox (incumbent) | 476,900 | 62.07 |
| Nonpartisan | Walter Kelly | 291,463 | 37.93 |
| Total votes | | 768,363 | 100 |
