= 2018 Wisconsin Attorney General election =

- November 6, 2018
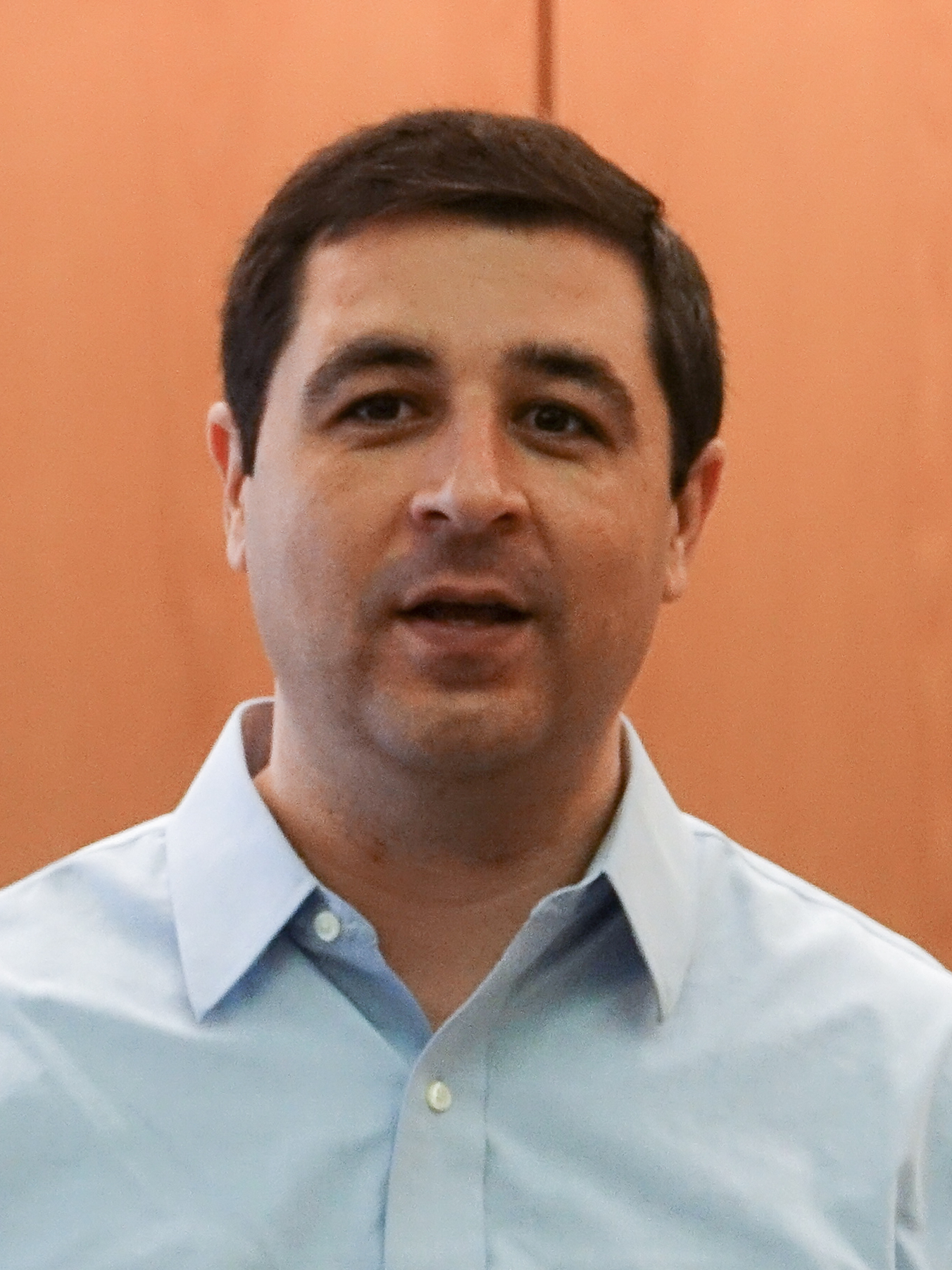

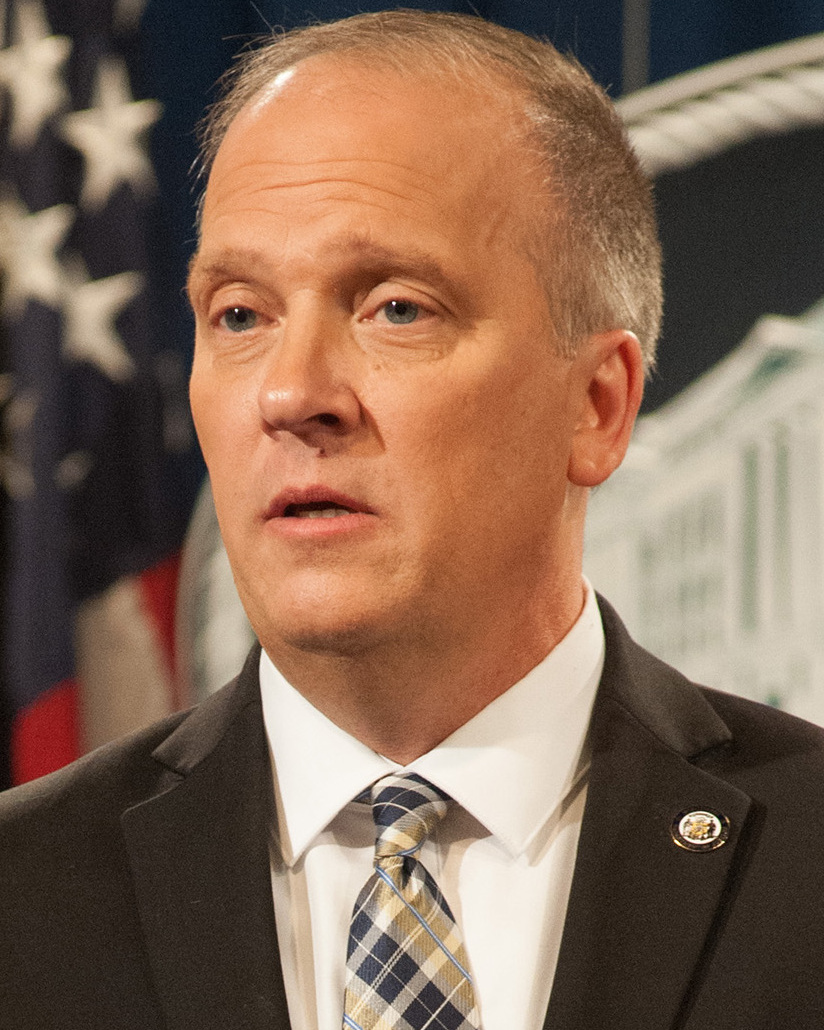
Nominee	Josh Kaul	Brad Schimel
Party	Democratic	Republican
Popular vote	1,305,902	1,288,712
Percentage	49.41%	48.76%
- Kaul: 40–50% 50–60% 60–70% 70–80% Schimel: 40–50% 50–60% 60–70% 70–80%
Attorney General before election
Brad Schimel
Republican
Elected Attorney General
Josh Kaul
Democratic

The 2018 Wisconsin Attorney General election took place on November 6, 2018, to elect the attorney general of Wisconsin.

Republican incumbent Brad Schimel, first elected in 2014, ran for re-election to a second term. Voting rights attorney and former federal prosecutor Josh Kaul, the Democratic nominee, narrowly defeated Schimel in the general election and became the first Democrat to be elected Wisconsin Attorney General since 2002. Terry Larson, the Constitution Party nominee, also garnered around 2% of the vote, greater than the vote difference between Schimel and Kaul.

== Republican primary ==
Incumbent Attorney General Brad Schimel ran unopposed in the Republican primary.

Republican primary results
Party	Candidate	Votes	%
Republican	Brad Schimel (incumbent)	394,799	99.77%
Republican	Write-in	896	0.23%
Total votes		395,695	100.0%

== Democratic primary ==
Attorney Josh Kaul won the Democratic nomination unopposed.

Democratic primary results
Party	Candidate	Votes	%
Democratic	Josh Kaul	432,954	99.65%
Democratic	Write-in	1,509	0.35%
Total votes		434,463	100.0%

== Constitution primary ==
Terry Larson won the Constitution Party nomination unopposed.

Constitution primary results
Party	Candidate	Votes	%
Constitution	Terry Larson	354	100.0%
Total votes		354	100.0%

== General election ==
=== Predictions ===
Source	Ranking	As of
Governing	Tossup	October 26, 2018

=== Polling ===
Poll source	Date(s) administered	Sample size	Margin of error	Brad Schimel (R)	Josh Kaul (D)	Undecided
Marquette University	October 24–28, 2018	1,154 LV	± 3.2%	47%	45%	8%
Marquette University	October 24–28, 2018	1,400 RV	± 3.0%	45%	43%	12%
Marquette University	October 3–7, 2018	799 LV	± 3.9%	47%	43%	10%
Marquette University	October 3–7, 2018	1,000 RV	± 3.6%	45%	41%	14%
Marquette University	September 12–16, 2018	614 LV	± 4.4%	48%	41%	11%
Marquette University	September 12–16, 2018	800 RV	± 4.0%	47%	40%	13%

=== Results ===
Kaul won the election by a 0.65% margin.

Wisconsin Attorney General election, 2018
Party	Candidate	Votes	%
Democratic	Josh Kaul	1,305,902	49.41%
Republican	Brad Schimel (incumbent)	1,288,712	48.76%
Constitution	Terry Larson	47,038	1.78%
Write-in		1,199	0.05%
Total votes		2,642,851	100.00%
Democratic gain from Republican			

==== By congressional district ====
Despite losing the state, Schimel won five of eight congressional districts.

District	Schimel	Kaul	Representative
1st	55%	43%	Paul Ryan
2nd	30%	69%	Mark Pocan
3rd	48%	50%	Ron Kind
4th	24%	74%	Gwen Moore
5th	62%	37%	Jim Sensenbrenner
6th	57%	41%	Glenn Grothman
7th	57%	41%	Sean Duffy
8th	56%	42%	Mike Gallagher

== See also ==
- 2018 United States attorney general elections
- 2018 Wisconsin elections
