= Josh Kaul =

Attorney General of Wisconsin since 2019

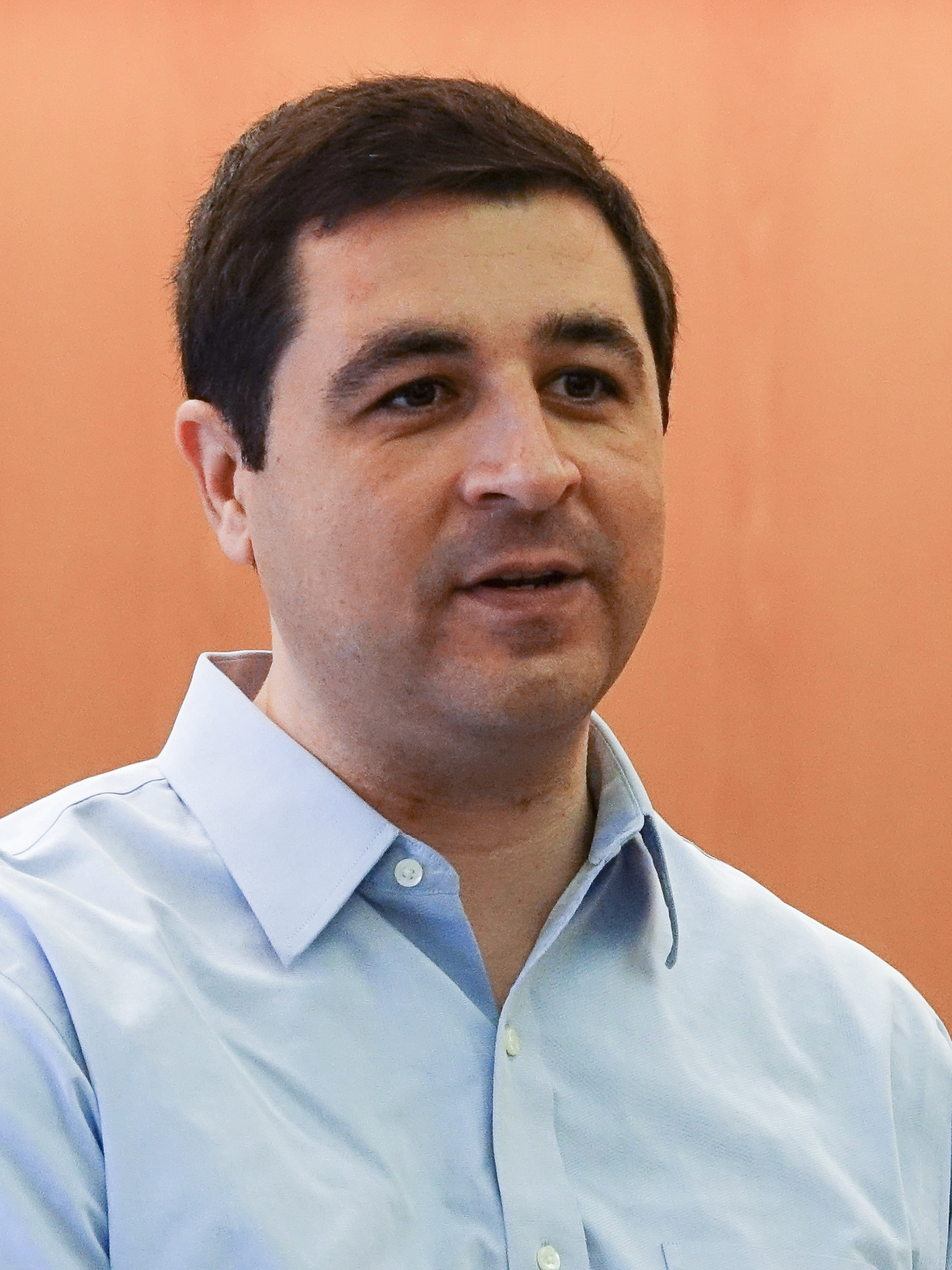
- Kaul in 2018

45th Attorney General of Wisconsin
- Incumbent
- Assumed office January 7, 2019
- Governor: Tony Evers; David Crowley (elect)
- Preceded by: Brad Schimel

Personal details
- Born: Joshua Lautenschlager Kaul; 1980 or 1981 (age 45–46)
- Party: Democratic
- Spouse: Lindsey Kaul
- Children: 2
- Relatives: Peg Lautenschlager (mother)
- Education: Yale University (BA); Stanford University (JD)
- Website: Campaign website

Joshua Lautenschlager Kaul (born 1980 or 1981) is an American lawyer serving as the 45th attorney general of Wisconsin since 2019. A member of the Democratic Party, he had worked as a federal prosecutor in Baltimore, Maryland, and in private practice before being elected attorney general. Kaul is the son of Peg Lautenschlager, the 42nd attorney general of Wisconsin and the first chair of the Wisconsin Ethics Commission.

== Early life and education ==
Kaul is the son of Peg Lautenschlager, an attorney and politician, and Kashmiri Pandit immigrant Raj Kaul. His stepfather, Bill Rippl, worked as a police officer. He was raised in Oshkosh and Fond du Lac, Wisconsin. Kaul graduated from Yale University as a double major in history and economics. He earned his Juris Doctor from Stanford Law School. While a student at Stanford, he served as president of the Stanford Law Review.

== Career ==
Kaul clerked for Michael Boudin in the U.S. First Circuit Court of Appeals. From 2007 through 2010, he worked for the law firm Jenner & Block, and worked as a federal prosecutor in the U.S. Attorney's office in Baltimore through 2014.

In 2014, Kaul moved back to Wisconsin and joined the Madison, Wisconsin office of the law firm Perkins Coie.

=== Attorney General of Wisconsin ===
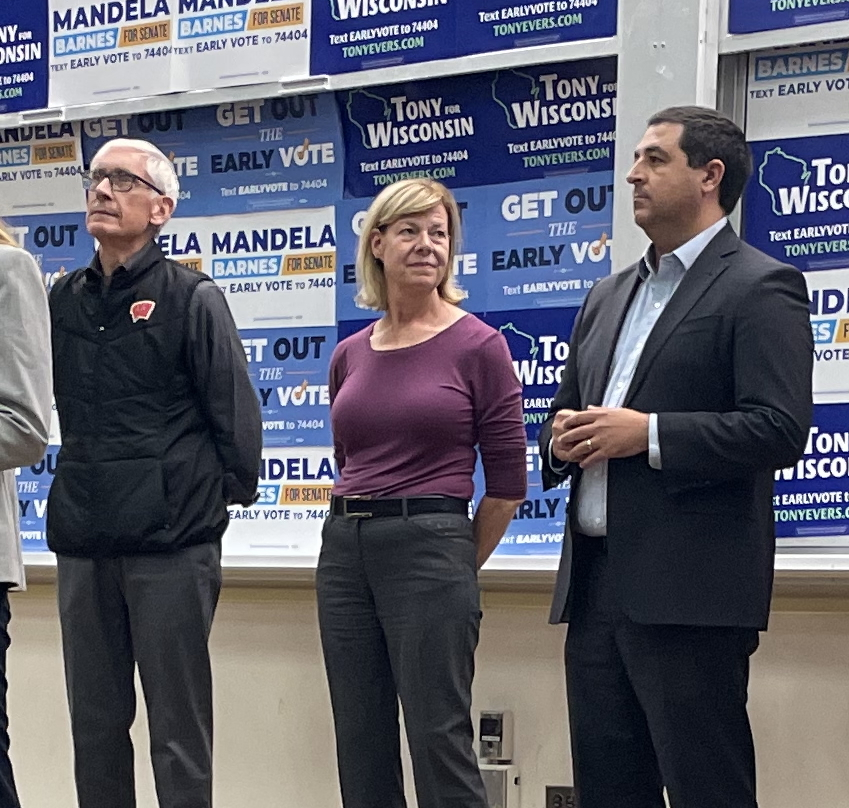
Kaul (right) with Governor Tony Evers and U.S. Senator Tammy Baldwin at a 2022 campaign event

In the 2018 elections, Kaul ran for Attorney General of Wisconsin and defeated the Republican incumbent Brad Schimel. Kaul won by a small margin of just over 17,000 votes, but Schimel decided not to seek a recount and conceded defeat on November 19. Kaul became the state's first Democratic Attorney General since his mother's term in office. Kaul was reelected in 2022, defeating Republican Eric Toney.

On June 4, 2024, Kaul announced he was bringing felony forgery charges against three operatives of Donald Trump's 2020 presidential campaign who were involved in the plot to produce fraudulent electoral college votes from Wisconsin. Those charged included Kenneth Chesebro, a Wisconsin native and the alleged architect of the national fraudulent elector plot, Jim Troupis, a former Wisconsin circuit court judge who represented Trump in 2020 litigation, and Mike Roman, a Trump campaign aide and former White House staffer.

After governor Tony Evers announced in 2025 that he would not run for a third term as governor, Kaul contemplated a run to succeed him as governor. Instead, however, Kaul announced in October 2025 that he would not run for governor, and would instead seek a third term as attorney general of Wisconsin in the 2026 election.

== Personal life ==
Kaul met his wife, Lindsey, at Yale. They have two sons.

== Electoral history ==
Wisconsin Attorney General Election, 2018
Party	Candidate	Votes	%	±%
Democratic	Josh Kaul	1,305,902	49.41%	+4.02pp
Republican	Brad Schimel (incumbent)	1,288,712	48.76%	−2.78pp
Constitution	Terry Larson	47,038	1.78%	
Write-in		1,199	0.05%	
Plurality		17,190	0.65%	
Total votes		2,642,851	100.0%	+12.45%
Democratic gain from Republican				

Wisconsin Attorney General Election, 2022
Party	Candidate	Votes	%	±%
Democratic	Josh Kaul (incumbent)	1,333,369	50.64%	+1.23pp
Republican	Eric Toney	1,298,369	49.31%	+0.55pp
Write-in		1,539	0.06%	+0.01pp
Plurality		35,000	1.33%	
Total votes		2,633,277	100.0%	+0.36%
Democratic hold				

Party political offices
Preceded by Susan Happ	Democratic nominee for Attorney General of Wisconsin; 2018, 2022, 2026	Most recent
Political offices
Preceded by Brad Schimel	Attorney General of Wisconsin; 2019–present	Incumbent
