= 2014 Wisconsin Attorney General election =

2014 Wisconsin Attorney General Election
- November 4, 2014
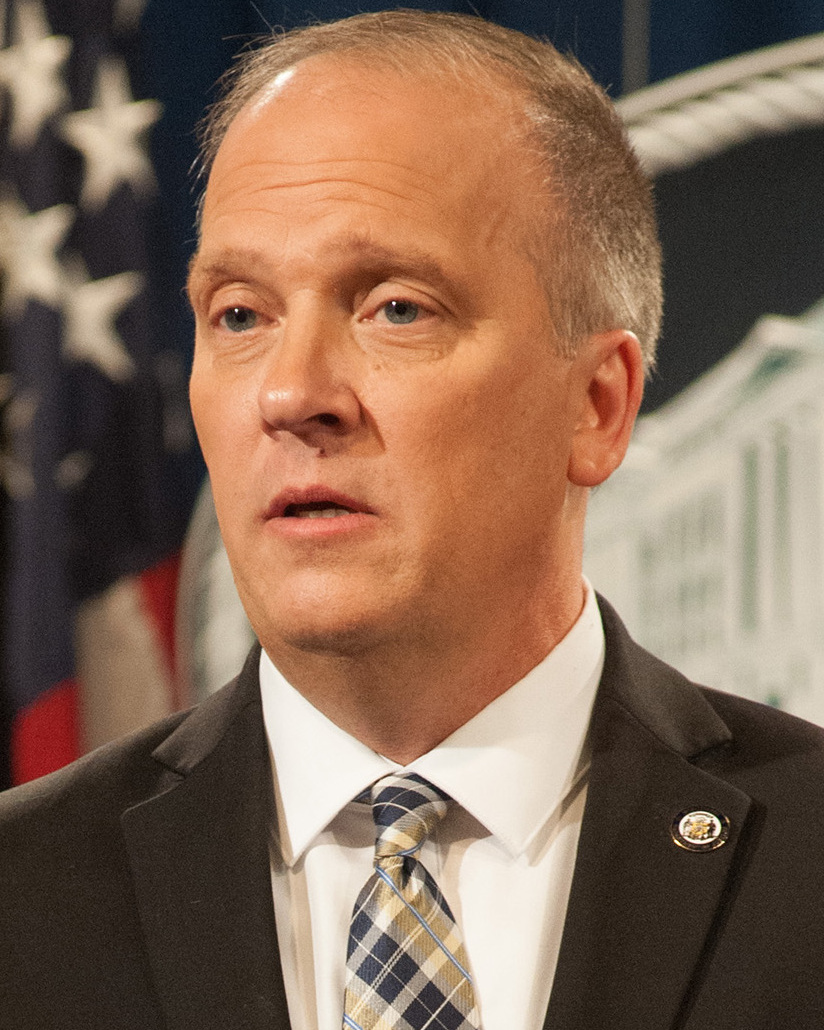

Candidate	Brad Schimel	Susan V. Happ
Party	Republican	Democratic
Popular vote	1,211,388	1,066,866
Percentage	51.54%	45.39%
- Schimel: 40–50% 50–60% 60–70% 70–80% Happ: 40–50% 50–60% 60–70% 70–80%
Attorney General before election
J.B. Van Hollen
Republican
Elected Attorney General
Brad Schimel
Republican

The 2014 Wisconsin Attorney General election took place on November 4, 2014, to elect the Attorney General of Wisconsin. incumbent attorney general J. B. Van Hollen, first elected in 2006, did not seek re-election to a third term. After facing no opposition in the primary, Waukesha County District Attorney Brad Schimel defeated Jefferson County District Attorney Susan Happ in the November general election.

== Republican primary ==
- Brad Schimel, Waukesha County District Attorney, ran unopposed for the Republican nomination.

== Democratic primary ==
=== Candidates ===
==== Nominee ====
- Susan Happ, Jefferson County District Attorney

==== Elimintated in the primary ====
- Jon Richards, State Representative
- Ismael Ozanne, Dane County District Attorney

=== Endorsements ===
Susan Happ

County District Attorneys

- Frederick Bourg, Bayfield County
- Angela Barenek, Barron County
- Gary King, Eau Claire County
- Chuck Simono, Forest County
- Mark Fuhr, Price County
- Louis Molepski, Jr., Portage County
- Taavi McMahon, Trempealeau County
Ismael Ozanne

Statewide politicians

- Peg Lautenschlager, former Wisconsin Attorney General
- Vel Phillips, former Wisconsin Secretary of State

County District Attorneys

- Larry Nelson, Iowa County
- Kate Findley, Lafayette County
- Joe DeCecco, Sheboygan County
- Kristi Tlusty, Taylor County

Local politicians

- Joe Parisi, Dane County Executive
- Dave Mahoney, Dane County Sheriff
- Carlo Esqueda, Dane County Clerk of Courts
- Bob Spoden, Rock County Sheriff
- Shawn Pfaff, Fitchburg Mayor

=== Results ===
Democratic primary results
Party	Candidate	Votes	%
Democratic	Susan Happ	144,367	52.1
Democratic	Jon Richards	90,101	32.5
Democratic	Ismael Ozanne	42,555	15.4
Total votes		277,023	100

== General election ==
=== Polling ===
Poll source	Date(s) administered	Sample size	Margin of error	Brad Schimel (R)	Susan Happ (D)	Other	Undecided
Marquette University	October 23–26, 2014	1,164 LV	± 3%	43.1%	38.7%	0.9%	17.3%
Marquette University	October 23–26, 2014	1,409 RV	± 2.7%	39.5%	39.5%	1.1%	19.8%
WPR/St. Norbert College	October 18–21, 2014	525	± 4.4%	41%	40%	—	19%
Marquette University	October 9–12, 2014	803 LV	± 3.5%	41.5%	41.5%	—	17%
Marquette University	October 9–12, 2014	1,004 RV	± 3.2%	39.1%	39%	0.2%	21.7%
Marquette University	September 25–28, 2014	585 LV	± 4.1%	40.9%	38.7%	1.1%	19.3%
Marquette University	September 25–28, 2014	801 RV	± 3.5%	36.9%	37.4%	1%	24.5%
Marquette University	September 11–14, 2014	589 LV	± 4.1%	41.9%	40.6%	0.4%	17%
Marquette University	September 11–14, 2014	800 RV	± 3.5%	38.3%	38.7%	1%	22%
Marquette University	August 21–24, 2014	609 LV	± 4.1%	32%	42.5%	0.6%	24.9%
Marquette University	August 21–24, 2014	815 RV	± 3.5%	32.8%	39.5%	0.7%	27.1%

=== Results ===
2014 Wisconsin Attorney General Election
Party	Candidate	Votes	%	±%
Republican	Brad Schimel	1,211,388	51.54%	−6.28%
Democratic	Susan V. Happ	1,066,866	45.39%	+3.24%
Independent	Thomas A. Nelson, Sr.	70,951	3.02%	
	Write-in	1,120	0.05%	
Plurality		144,522	6.15%	-9.51%
Total votes		2,350,325	100.0%	+11.26%
Republican hold				

=== By congressional districts ===
Schimel won 6 of 8 congressional districts, including one that elected a Democrat.

District	Schimel	Happ	Representative
1st	58%	40%	Paul Ryan
2nd	34%	63%	Mark Pocan
3rd	50%	47%	Ron Kind
4th	27%	70%	Gwen Moore
5th	67%	31%	Jim Sensenbrenner
6th	59%	38%	Glenn Grothman
7th	57%	40%	Sean Duffy
8th	58%	38%	Reid Ribble
