= 2001 Wisconsin Supreme Court election =

- April 3, 2001
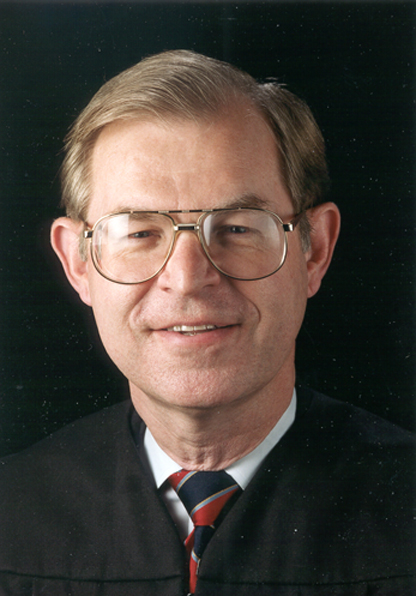
Candidate	David Prosser Jr.
Popular vote	549,860
Percentage	99.53%
- County results Prosser: >90%
Justice before election
David Prosser Jr.
Elected Justice
David Prosser Jr.

The 2001 Wisconsin Supreme Court election was held on April 3, 2001, to elect a justice to the Wisconsin Supreme Court for a ten-year term. Incumbent justice David Prosser Jr. was re-elected unopposed.

== Background ==
In September 1998, Governor Tommy Thompson appointed Prosser to a vacant seat on the Wisconsin Supreme Court.

While incumbent Wisconsin Supreme Court justices had rarely lost re-election in previous elections, unopposed re-elections were also somewhat rare. Of the previous eighteen elections, only five were unopposed races.

The Constitution of Wisconsin stipulates that early elections full terms can be triggered by a vacancy. The constitution stipulates that it is impermissible for more than one seat to be up for election in the same year. Elections must be moved to an earlier year after a vacancy, but only if there is a more immediate year without a scheduled contest. All supreme court elections are held during the spring elections in early April. Since there were was no supreme court election scheduled in 2001, but there were elections scheduled in 1999 and 2000, the vacancy moved the election to the next possible date, 2001. This allowed Prosser successor to serve as justice for two years before he would be up for election.

== Results ==
2001 Wisconsin Supreme Court election
Party	Candidate	Votes	%	±%
General election (April 3, 2001)
Nonpartisan	David Prosser Jr. (incumbent)	549,860	99.53	
	Scattering	2,569	0.47	
Total votes		552,429	100	-32.45%
