= Brad Schimel =

American politician and attorney (born 1965)

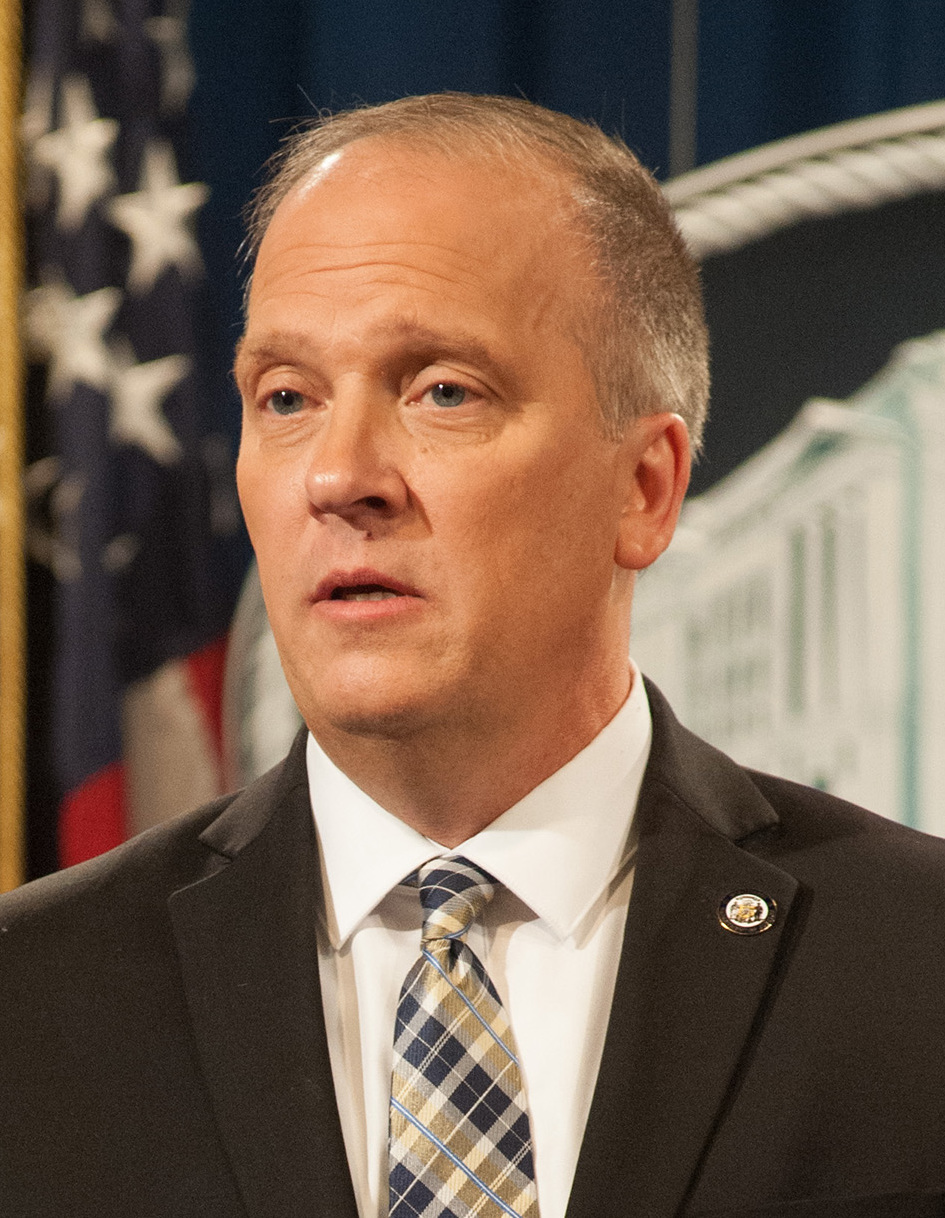
- Schimel in 2018

Interim United States Attorney for the Eastern District of Wisconsin
- In office November 17, 2025 – March 16, 2026
- President: Donald Trump
- Preceded by: Gregory Haanstad; Richard G. Frohling (acting)
- Succeeded by: --vacant--

Judge of the Waukesha County Circuit Court Branch 6
- In office January 7, 2019 – July 31, 2025
- Appointed by: Scott Walker
- Preceded by: Patrick Haughney
- Succeeded by: Zach Wittchow

44th Attorney General of Wisconsin
- In office January 5, 2015 – January 7, 2019
- Governor: Scott Walker
- Preceded by: J. B. Van Hollen
- Succeeded by: Josh Kaul

District Attorney of Waukesha County
- In office January 3, 2007 – January 5, 2015
- Preceded by: Paul Bucher
- Succeeded by: Susan Opper

Personal details
- Born: February 18, 1965 (age 61) West Allis, Wisconsin, U.S.
- Party: Republican
- Spouse: Sandi Schimel
- Children: 2
- Education: University of Wisconsin–Milwaukee (BA); University of Wisconsin–Madison (JD)

Brad David Schimel (born February 18, 1965) is an American attorney, former judge, and Republican politician. He most recently served as interim United States Attorney for the Eastern District of Wisconsin, from November 2025 until March 16, 2026, when his interim appointment was not extended by the district court judges. The Department of Justice, however, has announced their intention to appoint Schimel to a senior staff position in the U.S. attorney's office, leaving him as the de facto head of the office. He previously served as the 44th attorney general of Wisconsin (2015–2019) and was an unsuccessful candidate for Wisconsin Supreme Court in the 2025 election—the most expensive judicial race in history. He also served six years as a Wisconsin circuit court judge in Waukesha County (2019–2025), and served as district attorney of Waukesha County earlier in his career.

Schimel's political career began in 2006 when he was elected district attorney of Waukesha County as a Republican. He was subsequently elected attorney general in 2014, defeating Democrat Susan Happ to succeed fellow Republican J.B. Van Hollen. During his time as attorney general, Schimel advocated for anti-abortion positions and helped lead a coalition of 20 states in filing a lawsuit to overturn the Affordable Care Act. He was defeated seeking re-election in 2018 by Josh Kaul and was subsequently appointed a Wisconsin circuit court judge by outgoing Republican Governor Scott Walker. In November 2025, U.S. Attorney General Pam Bondi appointed Schimel as interim United States Attorney for the Eastern District of Wisconsin.

== Early life and education ==
Brad David Schimel was born in West Allis, Wisconsin, on February 18, 1965. His father is an Army veteran. After military service, his father spent his career in Wisconsin as a consulting engineer.

Schimel grew up in Vernon, Wisconsin. He graduated from Mukwonago High School and earned a bachelor’s degree from the University of Wisconsin–Milwaukee in 1987, before going on to obtain his Juris Doctor degree from the University of Wisconsin Law School in 1990.

Schimel and his wife, Sandi, have two adopted daughters and have continued to live in Waukesha County even during Schimel's time as attorney general. Schimel is a practicing Catholic. Schimel has made financial contributions to the political campaigns of Republican candidates.

== Career ==
Schimel has been an instructor in the Law Enforcement and Criminal Justice Department at Waukesha County Technical College and adjunct instructor at Concordia University Wisconsin.

=== District attorney ===
During law school, Schimel gained practical experience by interning at the Waukesha County District Attorney’s Office in 1989. He began his career as an assistant district attorney at the office starting in 1990. In 2006 Schimel was elected Waukesha County District Attorney. He would be re-elected without opposition in 2008, 2010, and 2012.

In 2005, Schimel successfully prosecuted Ron Schroeder, professionally known as "Silly the Clown", for child abuse.

In 2011, Schimel was appointed to serve on the Wisconsin Judicial Council and the Wisconsin Crime Victim Council.

=== Attorney general ===
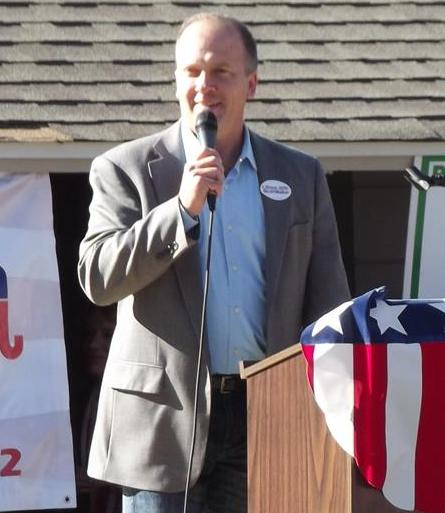
Schimel in 2014

On October 7, 2013, Wisconsin's then-attorney general, J. B. Van Hollen, announced he would not run for a third term in 2014. Schimel subsequently announced that he was considering a run to succeed Van Hollen; he formally announced his campaign less than a week later. Ultimately, no other Republican candidates entered the race, and Van Hollen endorsed Schimel as his successor. As a gun rights proponent, the National Rifle Association's Political Victory Fund endorsed his campaign. In the 2014 general election, Schimel defeated his opponent Democrat Susan Happ.

As attorney general, Schimel appealed the ruling by a federal judge in the United States District Court for the Eastern District of Wisconsin that Brendan Dassey, one of the subjects of Making a Murderer, had been coerced into confessing to a murder as an intellectually disabled 16-year old. Courts subsequently ruled either to free Dassey or block his release pending a new trial. Schimel argued that the United States Supreme Court should not hear Dassey's case. When the U.S. Supreme Court declined hearing Dassey's case, Schimel said he was pleased.

Schimel also attempted to resuscitate the abortion-limiting provisions of 2013's Act 37 passed by the Legislature. Those provisions, requiring abortion providers to have admitting privileges at a nearby hospital, were struck down by a federal judge in 2013. Schimel appealed the ruling to the 7th Circuit U.S. Court of Appeals, which upheld the district court decision in their November 2015 ruling. Schimel then appealed to the United States Supreme Court, but the U.S. Supreme Court declined to hear the appeal.

In November 2016, a three-judge panel of federal judges found that Wisconsin's legislative map, enacted in 2011, was an unconstitutional partisan gerrymander. The map had resulted in a persistent Republican majority of about 64% of both legislative chambers despite the popular vote in the state being evenly split between the two parties. Schimel appealed the decision to the United States Supreme Court, which heard the case along with other partisan gerrymandering questions in that term. The Court gave its opinion in the case Gill v. Whitford (2019), siding with Wisconsin Republicans and ruling that the plaintiffs had not demonstrated personal harm, and therefore did not have standing to challenge the map. The decision effectively ended federal court oversight of partisan gerrymandering questions.

As attorney general of Wisconsin, Schimel helped lead a 20-state lawsuit that sought to overturn the Affordable Care Act.

==== Pollution ====
On March 29, 2017 the Wisconsin State Journal reported that Attorney General Schimel reached a settlement with 3M Company over pollution violations without fining the company.

==== Sexual assault kits ====
During his tenure as Wisconsin Attorney General, Schimel faced criticism regarding the handling of a backlog of untested sexual assault kits (SAKs). Upon assuming office in January 2015, Schimel inherited 6,006 untested SAKs from previous years of buildup. In September 2015 his office secured $4,000,000 in federal grants to address the issue. By early 2017, Schimel claimed to have tested "hundreds" of untested kits, but two days later, spokeswoman Rebecca Ballweg admitted that only nine kits had been tested. Ballweg said Schimel's office would now use the grant money to send 200 SAKs to a private lab per month. Police departments were also criticized for dragging their feet on the testing. Schimel had expedited the process by authorizing overtime and the hiring of 11 part-time workers. By June 2018, Schimel's office had tested 1,900 kits out of the now-grown 6,800 untested kits.

Schimel announced in September 2018 that all but five of the eligible tests had been cleared after receiving about $7,000,000 total in grant funding.

Schimel stated that he used a victims' rights approach in gathering survivor consent and minimizing victimization. Schimel pointed out that members of the victim advocate group the Wisconsin Coalition Against Sexual Assault stated that the completion of the backlog of untested kits was a significant milestone and that they were satisfied with the pace of the tests.

=== State judge ===
In November 2018, after Schimel was defeated for reelection by Democratic candidate Josh Kaul, Republican Governor Scott Walker (who had lost his own re-election bid to Democratic candidate Tony Evers) appointed Schimel to the Waukesha County Circuit Court. The state Democratic Party criticized the appointment. Walker announced the appointment the day after Schimel conceded to Kaul. Walker passed over 13 applicants for the position to appoint Schimel; it is unclear whether Schimel submitted a formal application for the judicial vacancy. Schimel had submitted letters of recommendation for four other applicants for the job, including one of his campaign coordinators.

In October 2020, Schimel was an emcee at an Ozaukee County Republican Party fundraising event, alongside Ron Johnson and other Republican elected officials. This prompted criticism because Wisconsin state law states that judges must refrain from engaging in partisan political activity. Schimel defended his appearance at the event. Schimel also attended a Donald Trump rally at the Waukesha County Airport later that month, although he "emphasized he was attending the rally as an individual and Trump supporter."

After public defenders complained for months that Schimel's actions were putting litigants and counsel at risk, Schimel was reprimanded by the chief judge of the 3rd Judicial District. Chief Justice Patience Roggensack of the Wisconsin Supreme Court, who is the head of the Wisconsin state court system, barred Schimel from presiding over cases in person due to his refusal to wear a face covering (or hold proceedings all remotely via videoconference). The ban was lifted after Schimel agreed to wear a face covering in court.

=== 2025 Wisconsin Supreme Court election ===
Schimel declared his candidacy for the Wisconsin Supreme Court on November 30, 2023. He faced Dane County circuit judge Susan Crawford in the 2025 Wisconsin Supreme Court election, in a race to succeed retiring justice Ann Walsh Bradley. Though his seat on the Waukesha County Circuit Court was also part of the same election, he declined to contest for re-election and filed non-candidacy papers at the end of 2024. Zach Wittchow would win the April 1 election with Schimel's endorsement. Schimel's term then ended on July 31, 2025.

The Supreme Court election became the most expensive judicial race in United States history up to that time, and the identity and involvement of big-spending outside groups became a major flash-point in the campaign. Billionaire Elon Musk, at the time a senior advisor to U.S. President Donald Trump, has spent more than $14 million to support Schimel's campaign, including $7 million on television ads from his PAC Building America's Future, and $7.3 million on digital ads, mailers, and canvassing from his America PAC. Musk's electric car business Tesla also filed a lawsuit against the state of Wisconsin for its refusal to allow direct manufacturer sales of its cars in favor of car dealerships. The Tesla case could ultimately be decided by the Wisconsin Supreme Court. Schimel has not indicated he would step aside if he sat on the court and the case came before him.

The Richard Uihlein-backed PAC Fair Courts America also purchased more than $200,000 in air time in the state's eight media markets and other venues for ads supporting Schimel in the lead-up to the April 1 election. Elizabeth Uihlein, Richard Uihlein's wife, transferred $650,000 to the Schimel campaign through the Wisconsin Republican Party. In all, campaign spending exceeded $76 million by March 20, and was projected to reach $100 million by election day.

Schimel was also endorsed by the NRA Political Victory Fund.

=== U.S. attorney ===
On November 17, 2025, U.S. attorney general Pam Bondi announced that Schimel would be appointed interim United States Attorney for the Eastern District of Wisconsin. Schimel had earlier put his name forward, hoping to be formally nominated for that position, but the nominating commission failed to agree on a nominee, leaving the post vacant. Schimel then solicited an appointment directly from the Attorney General and received her approval. Because the U.S. Senate had not confirmed his appointment, Schimel needed to secure the support of a majority of the current U.S. district judges in the Eastern District of Wisconsin to extend his appointment beyond 120 days. On March 10, 2026, a majority of the judges in the Eastern District of Wisconsin declined to keep Schimel in his interim role and his appointment expired on March 16, 2026. The Department of Justice subsequently announced that they would leave the U.S. attorney position vacant and appoint Schimel to a senior staff position in the office, leaving him as de facto head of the U.S. attorney's office in eastern Wisconsin.

== Political positions ==
=== Abortion ban ===
Schimel has consistently advocated for anti-abortion positions.

He has argued for a return to Wisconsin's 1849 abortion law, which was interpreted as banning abortion in all cases except when the life of the mother was endangered. He supported retaining the then-unenforceable law prior to the United States Supreme Court's 2022 overturning of Roe v. Wade, which saw the 1849 abortion law reimplemented; the law was subsequently ruled not to prohibit consensual abortions. He has credited his anti-abortion stance to his adoption of two children.

=== Support for Donald Trump ===
Schimel is considered a staunch supporter of Donald Trump. During the 2020 US presidential election, he praised Trump at a campaign rally. Schimel said he does not object to Trump's pardons of supporters who attacked the United States Capitol on January 6, 2021.

== Electoral history ==
=== Waukesha County District Attorney (2006–2012) ===
Year	Election	Date	Elected				Defeated				Total	Plurality
2006	Primary	Sep. 12	Brad Schimel	Republican	20,270	57.59%	Dennis Krueger	Rep.	14,917	42.38%	35,199	5,353
2006	General	Nov. 7	Brad Schimel	Republican	132,967	99.39%	--unopposed--				133,807	132,147
2008	General	Nov. 4	Brad Schimel (inc)	Republican	168,330	99.57%	--unopposed--				169,061	167,599
2010	General	Nov. 2	Brad Schimel (inc)	Republican	51,290	100.0%	--unopposed--				51,290	N/A
2012	General	Nov. 6	Brad Schimel (inc)	Republican	158,479	99.31%	--unopposed--				159,575	157,383

=== Wisconsin Attorney General (2014, 2018) ===
Year	Election	Date	Elected				Defeated				Total	Plurality
2014	General	Nov. 4	Brad Schimel	Republican	1,211,388	51.54%	Susan V. Happ	Dem.	1,066,866	45.39%	2,350,325	144,522
2014	General	Nov. 4	Brad Schimel	Republican	1,211,388	51.54%	Thomas A. Nelson Sr.	Ind.	70,951	3.02%	2,350,325	144,522
2018	General	Nov. 6	Josh Kaul	Democratic	1,305,902	49.41%	Brad Schimel (inc)	Rep.	1,288,712	48.76%	2,642,851	17,190
2018	General	Nov. 6	Josh Kaul	Democratic	1,305,902	49.41%	Terry Larson	Con.	47,038	1.78%	2,642,851	17,190

=== Wisconsin Circuit Court (2019) ===
Year	Election	Date	Elected				Defeated	Total	Plurality
2019	General	Apr. 2	Brad Schimel (inc)	Nonpartisan	81,363	99.06%	--unopposed--	83,151	79,575

=== Wisconsin Supreme Court (2025) ===
Year	Election	Date	Elected				Defeated				Total	Plurality
2025	General	Apr. 1	Susan Crawford	Nonpartisan	1,301,137	55.02%	Brad Schimel	Non.	1,062,330	44.92%	2,364,887	238,807

Party political offices
Preceded by J. B. Van Hollen	Republican nominee for Attorney General of Wisconsin; 2014, 2018	Succeeded by Eric Toney
Legal offices
Preceded by J. B. Van Hollen	Attorney General of Wisconsin; 2015–2019	Succeeded by Josh Kaul
