= Wisconsin Tax Appeals Commission =

Independent state agency

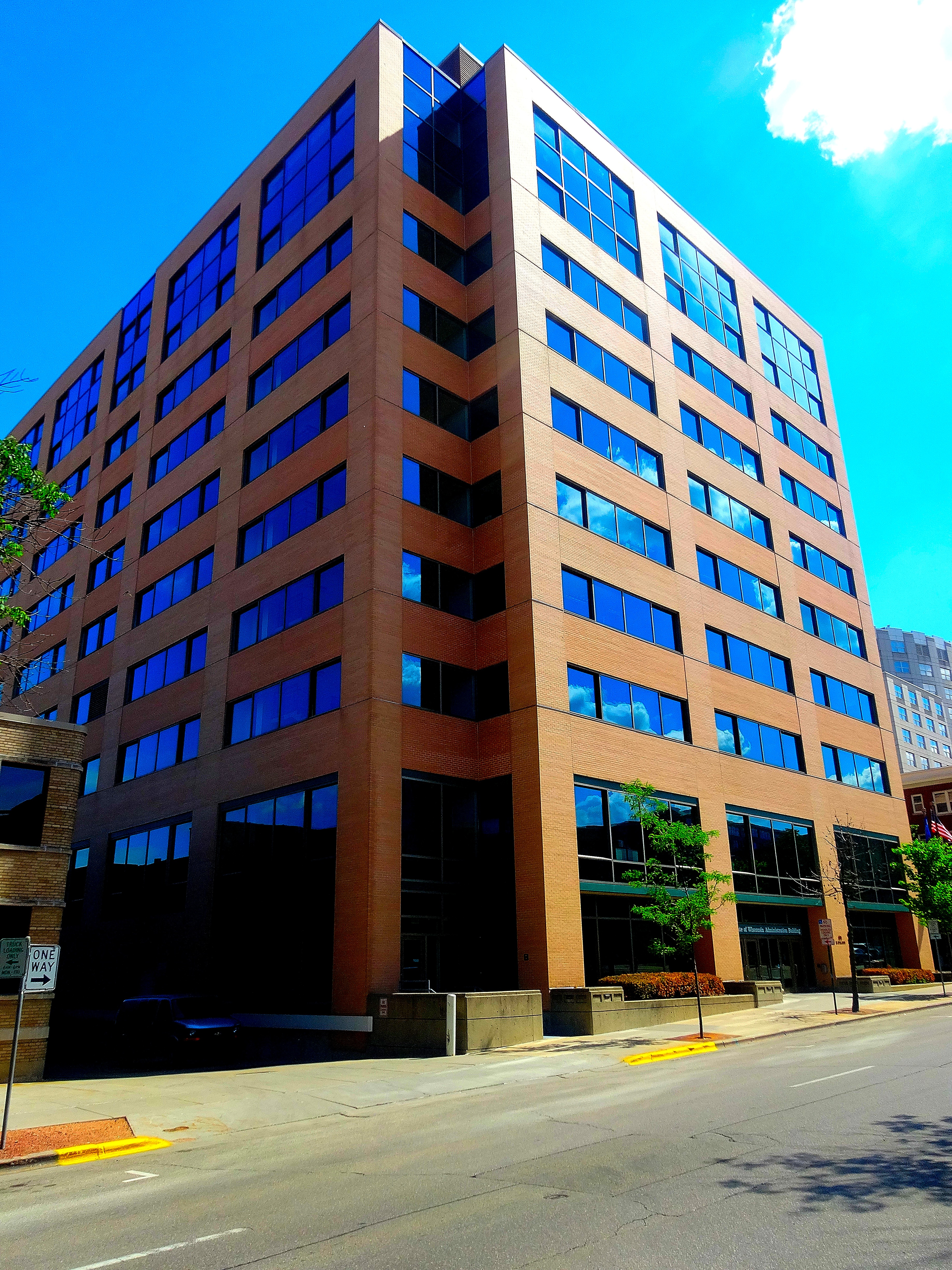
- Wisconsin Administration Building

Agency overview
- Formed: 1939; 87 years ago
- Headquarters: Wisconsin Administration Building; 101 E. Wilson St. Madison, Wisconsin, U.S. 43°4′23.88″N 89°22′46.452″W
- Employees: 5 (2021)
- Annual budget: $1,170,500 (2021)
- Agency executive: Elizabeth Kessler, Chair
- Parent department: Wisconsin Department of Administration
- Website: taxappeals.wi.gov

The Wisconsin Tax Appeals Commission is an independent state agency that was created by the Wisconsin Legislature to hear and determine disputes between taxpayers and the Wisconsin Departments of Revenue and Transportation. The Wisconsin Tax Appeals Commission also resolves tax disputes in the areas of individual income, corporate income, sales, cigarette, real property title transfer, homestead credit, and many more. It has its own website, beginning in 2021, at https://taxappeals.wi.gov/Pages/home.aspx.
