= Harvey Stower =

American politician

Pharis Harvey Stower Jr. (September 17, 1944 – September 29, 2009) was a Wisconsin politician and legislator.

== Early life, education, and career ==
Born in Frederic, Wisconsin, Stower and his family moved to Amery, Wisconsin, where he attended high school. Stower graduated from the University of Wisconsin–River Falls in 1966 with degrees in political science, English, and education. While attending UW-River Falls, Stower was active in United Methodist youth, campus politics, and social justice issues across the United States, including participating in the 1965 Selma to Montgomery march with Martin Luther King Jr., beginning a lifelong commitment to working for civil rights.

After teaching English at Prescott, Clayton, and Nicolet High Schools, Stower attended Wesley Theological Seminary in Washington, D.C., to pursue his dream of becoming an ordained United Methodist minister. He was ordained in 1977 before he and his wife, Marilyn, moved to Milwaukee, Wisconsin, where he served as a minister at Kenwood United Methodist Church for several years.

== Political career and community service ==
From 1983 to 1984 and 1989 to 1994, he served in the Wisconsin State Assembly, representing the 28th Assembly District as a Democrat. During that time, he served as co-chair of the Forest Productivity and Rural Development Committee, the bipartisan Rural Caucus, and Chair of the Assembly Tourism and Recreation Committee. In 1994, he ran unsuccessfully for the U.S. House District 3 seat.

"I'm glad my mother never told me not to talk about religion or politics, because I do 'em both," Stower said.

He liked to talk about other things: community values, taking care of kids, what democracy needs to work.

"Ours has become a microwave democracy," he said in 1995. "Our culture expects everything to be done to our satisfaction immediately. We want everything - food, entertainment, news, politics - done fast, no waiting. The national metabolism's been cranked up."

"Democracy doesn't work that way," Stower said. "Our cultural sense of immediate gratification doesn't fit with our political process. We need to understand that. Holy buckets, we need to put the brakes on."

Stower also served on the Wisconsin Land & Water Conservation Board, and the Boards of the Wisconsin Federation of Cooperatives, the Western Wisconsin Intergovernmental Collaborative, Wisconsin Church and Society-the United Methodist Church, and Inter-County Cooperative Publishing Association.

From 1996 until his death, Stower was mayor of Amery. His visionary leadership focused on developing the riverfront in Amery, downtown revitalization, economic growth, creating a thriving arts center, and improving the city's infrastructure through improved facilities for the airport, hospital, library, and food pantry.

== Awards ==
In 2001, Stower received the Award for Excellence from the Robert Gard Wisconsin Idea Foundation. He also received numerous awards for his work on issues regarding human services, environmental protections, the arts, and veterans programs.
