= Wisconsin Sentencing Commission =

Wisconsin state government agency

The Wisconsin Sentencing Commission was established to maintain an effective, fair, and efficient sentencing system for the state of Wisconsin.

== History ==
The Commission was eliminated in the State's 2007-09 Biennium Budget. The Commission no longer collects or analyzes sentencing guidelines worksheets. Sentencing courts in Wisconsin are still required to consider the guidelines under Wisconsin statute §973.017 (2)(a), but are not required to submit guidelines worksheets.
