= 2022 Wisconsin elections =

- April 5, 2022; November 8, 2022

The 2022 Wisconsin fall general election was held in the U.S. state of Wisconsin on November 8, 2022. All of Wisconsin's partisan executive and administrative offices were up for election, as well as one of Wisconsin's U.S. Senate seats, and Wisconsin's eight seats in the U.S. House of Representatives. The fall election also filled the seventeen odd-numbered seats in the Wisconsin Senate and all 99 seats in the Wisconsin State Assembly for the 106th Wisconsin Legislature. The 2022 Wisconsin fall primary was held on August 9, 2022.

The parties split the major state-wide races, with Democrats retaining the offices of governor and attorney general and Republicans retaining the U.S. Senate seat. Republicans gained one seat in the U.S. House delegation, taking the vast western 3rd congressional district following the retirement of 13-term Democratic congressman Ron Kind. Republicans also picked up one seat in the State Senate, reaching a supermajority. They also flipped one seat in the State Assembly, but fell three seats short of a supermajority in that chamber.

The 2022 Wisconsin spring election was held April 5, 2022. Three seats of the Wisconsin Court of Appeals were up in this election, as well as various nonpartisan local and judicial offices, including a special election for mayor of Milwaukee. The 2022 spring primary was held February 15, 2022.

These were the first elections held after the redistricting of the state following the 2020 United States census. The redistricting process could not be completed through the normal legislative process, and was handled by the Wisconsin Supreme Court, which selected the Republican Party's preferred map.

== Federal ==
=== U.S. Senate ===
Incumbent Republican Ron Johnson won a third six-year term, defeating the Democratic nominee, lieutenant governor Mandela Barnes.

Five other Democrats registered to run in the Democratic primary: State treasurer Sarah Godlewski, Milwaukee Bucks executive Alex Lasry, former Assembly majority leader Tom Nelson, businessman Adam Murphy, and attorney Peter Peckarsky. Barnes emerged from the primary after most of his prominent opponents withdrew from the race.

=== U.S. House ===
The 2022 United States House of Representatives elections in Wisconsin were held on November 8, 2022, to elect Wisconsin's delegation to the United States House of Representatives for the 118th United States Congress. A primary election for these offices was held August 9, 2022.

At the time of the 2022 election, Wisconsin had eight congressional districts, of which five were represented by Republicans and three were represented by Democrats. Seven of the eight incumbents ran for and won re-election — Bryan Steil (WI-01), Mark Pocan (WI-02), Gwen Moore (WI-04), Scott Fitzgerald (WI-05), Glenn Grothman (WI-06), Tom Tiffany (WI-07), and Mike Gallagher (WI-08).

- In Wisconsin's 3rd congressional district, Democrat Ron Kind retired after 24 years in congress. His seat was won by Republican Derrick Van Orden in the closest congressional race in the state.

These were the first congressional elections in Wisconsin under new districts, reflecting the 2020 United States census. The 2022 congressional district maps were Governor Tony Evers' "maps of least change" selected by the Wisconsin Supreme Court.

District		Incumbent		This race	
Location	2021 CPVI	Representative	First elected	Results	Candidates
Wisconsin 1	R+7	Bryan Steil	2018	Incumbent re-elected.	✓ Bryan Steil (Rep.) 54.05%; Ann Roe (Dem.) 45.14%; Charles E. Barman (Ind.) 0.75%
Wisconsin 2	D+18	Mark Pocan	2012	Incumbent re-elected.	✓ Mark Pocan (Dem.) 70.99%; Erik Olsen (Rep.) 26.92%; Douglas Alexander (Ind.) 2.03%
Wisconsin 3	R+4	Ron Kind	1996	Incumbent retired. New member elected. Republican gain.	✓ Derrick Van Orden (Rep.) 51.82%; Brad Pfaff (Dem.) 48.12%
Wisconsin 4	D+25	Gwen Moore	2004	Incumbent re-elected.	✓ Gwen Moore (Dem.) 75.27%; Tim Rogers (Rep.) 22.61%; Robert R. Raymond (Ind.) 2.03%
Wisconsin 5	R+11	Scott L. Fitzgerald	2020	Incumbent re-elected.	✓ Scott L. Fitzgerald (Rep.) 64.39%; Mike Van Someren (Dem.) 35.55%
Wisconsin 6	R+10	Glenn Grothman	2014	Incumbent re-elected.	✓ Glenn Grothman (Rep.) 94.93%; Tom Powell (Ind. write-in) 0.13%
Wisconsin 7	R+12	Tom Tiffany	2020 (special)	Incumbent re-elected.	✓ Tom Tiffany (Rep.) 61.85%; Richard D. Ausman (Dem.) 38.10%
Wisconsin 8	R+10	Mike Gallagher	2016	Incumbent re-elected.	✓ Mike Gallagher (Rep.) 72.21%; Paul David Boucher (Ind.) 15.76%; Jacob J. VandenPlas (Lib.) 10.33%; Julie Hancock (Dem. write-in) 1.02%

== State ==
=== Executive ===
All of Wisconsin's partisan executive offices were up for election in November 2022 with partisan primaries held on August 9.

==== Governor ====
Incumbent Democratic governor Tony Evers, first elected in 2018, was re-elected to a second four-year term. He defeated the Republican nominee, businessman Tim Michels.

In the Republican primary, Michels defeated former lieutenant governor Rebecca Kleefisch, state representative Timothy Ramthun, and former police officer Adam J. Fischer. Kevin Nicholson, another prominent Wisconsin businessman, withdrew from the race before the primary.

==== Lieutenant governor ====
Incumbent Democratic lieutenant governor Mandela Barnes, first elected in 2018, did not run for re-election—he instead ran for United States Senate. State representative Sara Rodriguez won the Democratic nomination and was elected as a ticket with Tony Evers. State Senator Roger Roth won the Republican primary for lieutenant governor.

Other candidates in the Democratic primary included Peng Her, the CEO of Hmong Institute, and state representative David Bowen. Bowen did not file papers to be on the ballot and subsequently suspended his campaign. State senator Lena Taylor initially declared an intention to run for the office, but dropped out in December 2021, six months before the filing deadline.

Other Republican candidates included state senate president pro tempore Patrick Testin, Lancaster mayor David Varnam, David King, Jonathan Wichmann, Will Martin, Kyle Yudes, Cindy Werner, and Ben Voelkel.

==== Attorney general ====
Incumbent Democratic attorney general Josh Kaul, first elected in 2018, was re-elected to a second four-year term. He defeated the Republican nominee, Fond du Lac County district attorney Eric Toney.

Toney defeated former state representative Adam Jarchow and attorney Karen Mueller, from Chippewa Falls, in the Republican primary.

==== Secretary of state ====
Incumbent Democratic secretary of state Doug La Follette, first elected in 1974, narrowly won his 12th four-year term, defeating the Republican candidate, state representative Amy Loudenbeck.

La Follette defeated Alexia Sabor, the chair of the Dane County Democratic Party, in the Democratic primary.

Other Republican primary candidates included Justin D. Schmidtka and Jay Schroeder, the party's 2018 nominee.

Sharyl R. McFarland ran as the Wisconsin Green Party nominee, and Neil Harmon ran on the Libertarian Party ticket.

==== Treasurer ====
Incumbent Democratic state treasurer Sarah Godlewski, first elected in 2018, did not run for re-election—she instead sought the Democratic nomination for United States Senate. The election was won by Republican John Leiber, a lawyer from Racine County, Wisconsin. He defeated Democrat Aaron Richardson, the mayor of Fitchburg, Wisconsin.

Other candidates in the Democratic primary included West Allis city councilmember Angelito Tenorio and radiologist Gillian Battino. Former state treasurer Dawn Marie Sass also circulated nomination papers but missed the filing deadline.

On the Republican side Orlando Owens, a pastor and staffer for U.S. senator Ron Johnson, received the state Republican Party's endorsement, but he lost the primary to Leiber.

Andrew Zuelke ran as the Constitution Party nominee.

=== Legislature ===
==== State Senate ====
The 17 odd-numbered districts out of the 33 seats in the Wisconsin Senate were up for election in 2022. Republicans won 12 of those 17 seats, for a net gain of one seat, giving them a supermajority in this chamber going into the 106th Wisconsin Legislature.

These were the first state senate elections in Wisconsin under new districts, reflecting the 2020 United States census. The 2022 state senate maps were the Republican Legislature's "maps of least change" selected by the Wisconsin Supreme Court.

Seats	Party (majority caucus shading)		Total
Seats	Democratic	Republican	Total
Total after last election (2020)	12	21	33
Total before this election	12	21	33
Up for election	6	11	17
This election	5	12	17
Total after this election	11	22	33
Change in total	▼1	▲1	

==== State Assembly ====
All 99 seats in the Wisconsin State Assembly were up for election in 2022. Republicans won 64 of those seats, for a net gain of three seats. They fell short of their goal of 66 seats, which would have given them a supermajority.

These were the first state assembly elections in Wisconsin under new districts, reflecting the 2020 United States census. The 2022 state assembly maps were the Republican Legislature's "maps of least change" selected by the Wisconsin Supreme Court, maintaining Wisconsin's already heavily gerrymandered districts.

Seats	Party (majority caucus shading)		Total	Vacant
Seats	Democratic	Republican	Total	Vacant
Total after last election (2020)	38	61	99	0
Total before this election	38	57	95	4
Up for election	38	57	95	4
This election	35	64	99	0
Total after this election	35	64	99	0
Change in total	▼3	▲3	Steady	

=== Judiciary ===
==== State Court of Appeals ====
Three seats on the Wisconsin Court of Appeals were up for election in April 2022.

- In District II, Judge Lori Kornblum, appointed by Governor Tony Evers in 2021, was defeated by Waukesha County circuit judge Maria S. Lazar.
- In District III, Judge Thomas Hruz, appointed by Governor Scott Walker in 2014, was unopposed seeking a second six-year term.
- In District IV, Judge Brian Blanchard, first elected in 2010, was unopposed seeking a third six-year term.

==== State Circuit Courts ====
Forty six of the state's 257 circuit court seats were up for election in April 2022. Nine of those seats were contested. One of the contested seats, in Vilas County, was newly created from a 2020 act of the Wisconsin Legislature. Three other newly created seats, in Adams, Eau Claire, and Vilas counties, had only one candidate running. Only three incumbent judges faced a contested re-election, and only one incumbent judge lost her election—LaKeisha Haase of Winnebago County, who had been appointed a year earlier by Governor Tony Evers.

- In Iowa County, incumbent district attorney Matt Allen defeated former municipal judge Rhonda Hazen for the judicial seat being vacated by Judge Margaret M. Koehler.
- In Kewaunee County, county corporation counsel Jeffrey R. Wisnicky defeated Brown County assistant district attorney Kimberly A. Hardtke for the judicial seat being vacated by Judge Keith A. Mehn. Attorney John Peterson was eliminated in the February primary.
- In Marathon County, attorney Rick Cveykus defeated county supervisor William A. Harris for the judicial seat being vacated by Judge Gregory Huber.
- In Oconto County, incumbent judge Jay Conley defeated incumbent district attorney Edward Burke.
- In Portage County, incumbent district attorney Louis J. Molepske defeated defense attorney Stephen W. Sawyer for the judicial seat being vacated by Judge Robert J. Shannon.
- In Sauk County, incumbent judge Michael Screnock defeated attorney Blake J. Duren.
- In Vilas County, attorney Daniel Overby defeated Milwaukee County assistant district attorney Meg O'Marro for a newly created judicial seat.
- In Winnebago County Branch 3, attorney Bryan Keberlein defeated court commissioner Lisa Krueger for the judicial seat being vacated by Judge Barbara Hart Key.
- In Winnebago County Branch 4, attorney Mike Gibbs defeated incumbent judge LaKeisha Haase.

Circuit	Branch	Incumbent	Elected			Defeated			Defeated in primary
Circuit	Branch	Incumbent	Name	Votes	%	Name	Votes	%	Defeated in primary
Adams	2	--New seat--	Tania M. Bonnett	2,014	98.24%				
Barron	1	James C. Babler	James C. Babler	6,524	99.62%				
Crawford		Lynn Marie Ryder	Lynn Marie Ryder	1,521	98.83%				
Dane	3	Valerie L. Bailey-Rihn	Diane Schlipper	59,011	99.15%				
Dane	4	Everett Mitchell	Everett Mitchell	59,312	99.01%				
Dane	5	Nicholas J. McNamara	Nicholas J. McNamara	58,155	99.15%				
Dane	14	John D. Hyland	John D. Hyland	58,064	99.09%				
Dane	15	Stephen Ehlke	Stephen Ehlke	58,090	99.16%				
Eau Claire	1	John F. Manydeeds	John F. Manydeeds	13,721	98.81%				
Eau Claire	6	--New seat--	Beverly Wickstrom	13,046	98.71%				
Fond du Lac	2	Peter L. Grimm	Laura Lavey	11,164	99.97%				
Fond du Lac	4	Gary R. Sharpe	Tricia L. Walker	10,854	99.91%				
Fond du Lac	5	Paul G. Czisny	Douglas R. Edelstein	10,684	99.96%				
Iowa		Margaret M. Koehler	Matt Allen	3,170	65.19%	Rhonda R. Hazen	1,689	34.73%	
Kewaunee		Keith A. Mehn	Jeffrey R. Wisnicky	2,720	62.41%	Kimberly A. Hardtke	1,628	37.36%	John Peterson
Lincoln	1	Jay R. Tlusty	Galen Bayne-Allison	5,479	99.20%				
Marathon	2	Gregory Huber	Rick Cveykus	16,753	67.91%	William A. Harris	7,891	31.98%	
Milwaukee	5	Kristela Cervera	Kristela Cervera	89,969	98.53%				
Milwaukee	14	Christopher R. Foley	Christopher R. Foley	91,898	98.62%				
Milwaukee	25	Stephanie Rothstein	Nidhi Kashyap	87,737	98.52%				
Milwaukee	31	Hannah C. Dugan	Hannah C. Dugan	89,206	98.42%				
Milwaukee	34	Glenn H. Yamahiro	Glenn H. Yamahiro	89,065	98.51%				
Milwaukee	44	Gwen Connolly	Gwen Connolly	89,591	98.74%				
Milwaukee	45	Jean Marie Kies	Jean Marie Kies	87,965	98.70%				
Monroe	2	Mark L. Goodman	Mark L. Goodman	6,343	99.34%				
Oconto	2	Jay N. Conley	Jay N. Conley	5,822	73.43%	Ed Burke	2,093	26.40%	
Outagamie	4	Yadira Rein	Yadira J. Rein	18,167	100.0%				
Outagamie	7	Mark G. Schroeder	Mark G. Schroeder	18,352	100.0%				
Pierce		Elizabeth Rohl	Elizabeth Rohl	5,748	99.34%				
Portage	2	Robert J. Shannon	Louis J. Molepske Jr.	9,454	56.17%	Stephen W. Sawyer	7,357	43.71%	
Portage	3	Patricia Baker	Patricia Baker	11,421	98.97%				
Racine	2	Eugene Gasiorkiewicz	Eugene Gasiorkiewicz	18,273	98.47%				
Racine	4	Mark Nielsen	Mark Nielsen	18,444	98.86%				
Racine	5	Kristin Cafferty	Kristin Cafferty	18,258	98.87%				
Rusk		Steven P. Anderson	Annette Barna	2,010	96.68%				
Sauk	1	Michael P. Screnock	Michael P. Screnock	5,557	51.66%	Blake J. Duren	5,199	48.34%	
Sauk	2	Wendy J. N. Klicko	Wendy J. N. Klicko	8,446	100.0%				
St. Croix	4	R. Michael Waterman	R. Michael Waterman	11,076	99.00%				
Vilas	1	Martha Milanowski	Martha Milanowski	3,766	99.58%				
Vilas	2	--New seat--	Daniel Overbey	2,597	56.20%	Meg Colleen O'Marro	2,017	43.65%	
Walworth	2	Daniel S. Johnson	Daniel S. Johnson	12,028	99.02%				
Walworth	4	David M. Reddy	David M. Reddy	12,055	99.03%				
Waushara	2	--New seat--	Scott C. Blader	3,154	99.15%				
Winnebago	3	Barbara Hart Key	Bryan D. Keberlein	13,745	54.49%	Lisa Krueger	11,421	45.27%	
Winnebago	4	LaKeisha Haase	Mike Gibbs	13,786	53.23%	LaKeisha Haase	12,081	46.64%	
Winnebago	5	John Jorgensen	John Jorgensen	19,418	98.91%				

== Local elections ==
=== Milwaukee ===
- A special election for Mayor of Milwaukee was held concurrent with the Spring general election to fill the vacancy caused by the resignation of Mayor Tom Barrett. Acting mayor and former city council president Cavalier Johnson defeated former city councilmember Bob Donovan. Johnson became the first African American to be elected mayor of Milwaukee. City councilmember Marina Dimitrijevic, Milwaukee County sheriff Earnell Lucas, entrepreneur Michael Sampson, community advocate Nick McVey, and teacher Sheila Conley-Patterson were eliminated in the February primary. State representative Daniel Riemer had filed to run, but dropped out of the race on December 23, 2021.

=== Waukesha ===
- Shawn Reilly was re-elected to a third term as mayor of Waukesha, Wisconsin. He was a Republican who quit the party over the 2021 United States Capitol attack.

== See also ==
- Republican efforts to restrict voting following the 2020 presidential election § Wisconsin
- 2022 Wisconsin gubernatorial election
- 2022 Wisconsin Attorney General election
- 2022 Wisconsin State Senate election
- 2022 Wisconsin State Assembly election
- 2022 United States House of Representatives elections in Wisconsin
- 2022 United States elections
- Elections in Wisconsin
- Redistricting in Wisconsin
