= 2022 Milwaukee mayoral special election =

- April 5, 2022
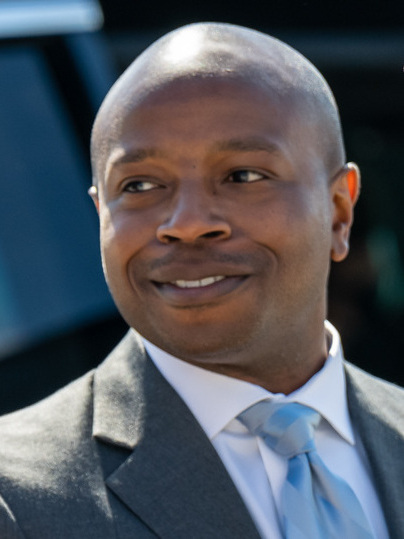

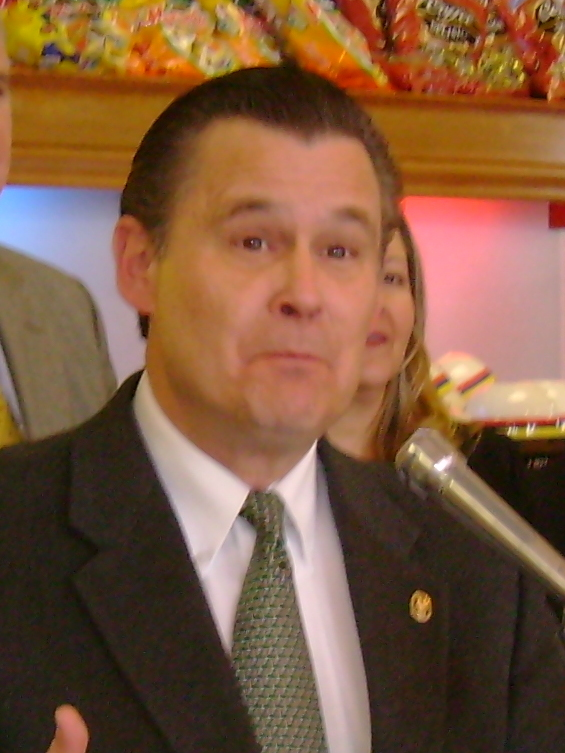
Candidate	Cavalier Johnson	Bob Donovan
Popular vote	62,143	24,543
Percentage	71.7%	28.3%
Mayor before election
Cavalier Johnson (acting)
Elected mayor
Cavalier Johnson

The 2022 Milwaukee mayoral special election was held on April 5, 2022, concurrent with Wisconsin's spring general election, to elect a new mayor of Milwaukee, Wisconsin, following the resignation of mayor Tom Barrett in December 2021. Acting mayor Cavalier Johnson, who had been president of the common council when Barrett resigned, won the election, receiving 71% of the vote and defeating alderman Bob Donovan. Johnson became the first African American elected mayor of Milwaukee.

Municipal elections in Wisconsin are nonpartisan. A nonpartisan primary election was held on February 15, 2022, in which the top two vote-getters advanced to the April general election. This special election was the first open race for mayor of Milwaukee since 2004.

== Candidates ==
=== Advanced to general ===
- Bob Donovan, Milwaukee alderman and candidate for mayor in 2016
- Cavalier Johnson, Milwaukee Common Council president and acting mayor

=== Eliminated in primary ===
- Sheila Conley-Patterson
- Marina Dimitrijevic, Milwaukee alderwoman and former chairwoman of the Milwaukee County Board of Supervisors
- Earnell Lucas, Milwaukee County sheriff
- Nick McVey
- Michael Sampson
- Lena Taylor, Wisconsin state senator, former Wisconsin state assemblywoman, and candidate for mayor in 2020

=== Withdrew ===
- Daniel Riemer, Wisconsin state assemblyman

=== Declined ===
- Chris Abele, former Milwaukee County Executive
- Mandela Barnes, Lieutenant Governor of Wisconsin and former Wisconsin state assemblyman (ran for U.S. Senate)
- David Bowen, Wisconsin state assemblyman
- David Clarke, former Milwaukee County sheriff
- Evan Goyke, Wisconsin state assemblyman
- Chris Larson, former minority leader of the Wisconsin Senate
- Chantia Lewis, Milwaukee alderman
- Michael Murphy, Milwaukee alderman
- Tearman Spencer, Milwaukee city attorney

== Endorsements ==
Bob Donovan

State officials

- Rebecca Kleefisch, former Lieutenant Governor of Wisconsin (2011–2019)
Cavalier Johnson

County officials

- David Crowley, Milwaukee County Executive

Organizations

- Democratic Party of Milwaukee County
- Democratic Party of Wisconsin
- International Brotherhood of Electrical Workers Local 494

== Primary election ==
=== Polling ===
Poll source	Date(s) administered	Sample size (Note: Key: A – all adults RV – registered voters LV – likely voters V – unclear)	Margin of error	Marina Dimitrijevic	Bob Donovan	Isehuh Griffin	Cavalier Johnson	Earnell Lucas	Michael Sampson	Lena Taylor	Undecided
Remington Research Group (R) (Note: This poll was sponsored by Leaders for a Better Community)	February 2–3, 2022	673 (LV)	± 4.0%	5%	24%	1%	41%	6%	1%	10%	12%
Public Policy Polling (D) (Note: This poll was sponsored by Milwaukee Works)	January 19–20, 2022	1,135 (LV)	± 2.9%	7%	18%	1%	25%	5%	1%	13%	30%
Global Strategy Group (D) (Note: This poll was sponsored by Johnson's campaign)	January 5–10, 2022	500 (LV)	± 4.4%	9%	14%	–	25%	7%	–	18%	25%

=== Results ===
2022 Milwaukee mayoral special primary
Candidate	Votes	%
Cavalier Johnson (incumbent)	25,779	41.79%
Bob Donovan	13,742	22.28%
Lena Taylor	7,877	12.77%
Marina Dimitrijevic	7,521	12.19%
Earnell Lucas	5,886	9.53%
Michael Sampson	514	0.83%
Ieshuh Griffin	315	0.51%
Write-in	56	0.09%
Total votes	61,743	100.00%

== General election ==
=== Results ===
2022 Milwaukee mayoral special election
Candidate	Votes	%
Cavalier Johnson (incumbent)	62,143	71.69%
Bob Donovan	24,543	28.31%
Total votes	86,686	100.00%

== Notes ==
Partisan clients
