= Electoral history of David Clarke =

List of elections featuring David A. Clarke Jr. as a candidate

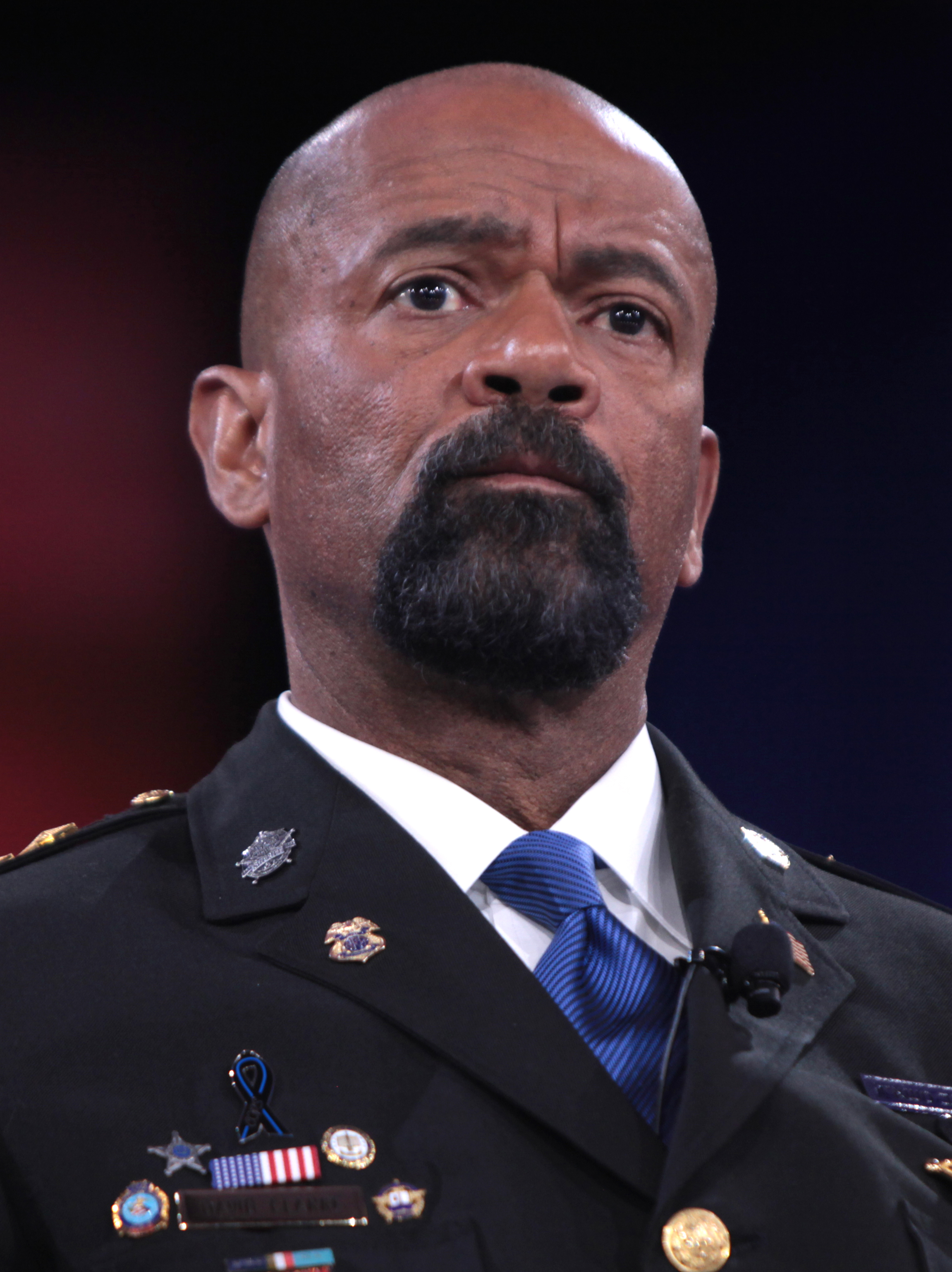
Sheriff David Clarke

The following is the electoral history of David Clarke. He served four terms as the 64th Sheriff of Milwaukee County, Wisconsin, before resigning on August 31, 2017.

== Milwaukee County sheriff elections ==
=== 2002 ===
Milwaukee County sheriff primary election, 2002
Party	Candidate	Votes	%
Democratic	David A. Clarke Jr.	40,329	59.10
Democratic	Pete Misko	17,645	25.86
Democratic	Mark Hayes	10,135	14.85
Democratic	Write-in	132	0.19

Milwaukee County sheriff general election, 2002
Party	Candidate	Votes	%
Democratic	David A. Clarke Jr.	100,853	74.30
Republican	Ken Bohn	34,410	25.35
Nonpartisan	Write-in	476	0.35

=== 2006 ===
Milwaukee County sheriff primary election, 2006
Party	Candidate	Votes	%
Democratic	David A. Clarke Jr. (incumbent)	18,867	53.63
Democratic	Vincent Bobot	16,267	46.24
Democratic	Write-in	48	0.14

Milwaukee County sheriff general election, 2006
Party	Candidate	Votes	%
Democratic	David A. Clarke Jr. (incumbent)	128,578	77.85
Republican	Don Holt	35,436	21.45
Nonpartisan	Write-in	1,156	0.70

=== 2010 ===
Milwaukee County sheriff primary election, 2010
Party	Candidate	Votes	%
Democratic	David A. Clarke Jr. (incumbent)	20,176	56.64
Democratic	Chris Moews	15,377	43.17
Democratic	Write-in	70	0.20

Milwaukee County sheriff general election, 2010
Party	Candidate	Votes	%
Democratic	David A. Clarke Jr. (incumbent)	145,574	80.42
Republican	Steven Duckhorn	34,704	19.17
Nonpartisan	Write-in	749	0.41

=== 2014 ===
Milwaukee County sheriff primary election, 2014
Party	Candidate	Votes	%
Democratic	David A. Clarke Jr. (incumbent)	59,212	51.99
Democratic	Chris Moews	54,587	47.93
Democratic	Write-in	87	0.08

Milwaukee County sheriff general election, 2014
Party	Candidate	Votes	%
Democratic	David A. Clarke Jr. (incumbent)	147,809	79.12
Independent	Angela Walker	37,289	19.96
Nonpartisan	Write-in	1,718	0.92

== Mayor of Milwaukee election ==
2004 Milwaukee mayoral primary election
Party	Candidate	Votes	%
Democratic	Marvin Pratt	51,653	38.03
Democratic	Tom Barrett	44,342	32.65
Democratic	David A. Clarke Jr.	23,185	17.07
Nonpartisan	Thomas G. Nardelli	4,863	3.58
Nonpartisan	Sandy Folaron	4,318	3.18
Democratic	Vincent Bobot	4,125	3.04
Nonpartisan	Arthur L. Jones	1,180	0.87
Nonpartisan	Frank Cumberbatch	814	0.60
Nonpartisan	John V. Pitta	789	0.58
Green	Leon Todd	557	0.41
