= Hannah Dugan =

American former judge (born 1959)

Judge of the Milwaukee County Circuit Court Branch 31
- In office August 1, 2016 – January 3, 2026; Suspended: April 29, 2025 – January 3, 2026
- Preceded by: Paul Rifelj
- Succeeded by: Owen Piotrowski

Personal details
- Born: Hannah C. Dugan; 1959 (age 66–67)
- Education: University of Wisconsin, Madison (BA, JD); Boston College (MA)

Hannah C. Dugan (born 1959) is an American attorney and former Wisconsin circuit court judge for Milwaukee County who resigned after a jury convicted her for obstructing federal agents. She previously was president of the Milwaukee Bar Association, served as an executive director of Catholic Charities USA in southeastern Wisconsin, and worked with several legal aid organizations.

On April 25, 2025, Dugan was arrested by the Federal Bureau of Investigation (FBI) and indicted on federal charges after she informed a defendant who was an illegal immigrant about the presence of federal Immigration and Customs Enforcement (ICE) agents and directed him to leave through a nonpublic exit of the courthouse, thereby impeding federal agents who were attempting to take him into custody following his court appearance. The case drew national attention, with differing views expressed regarding the scope of federal enforcement authority and judicial conduct. Critics described the arrest as politically motivated and indicative of authoritarian enforcement under the second Trump administration, while supporters characterized it as a legitimate application of federal law.

The Wisconsin Supreme Court suspended Dugan from judicial duties pending the outcome of the case. On December 18, 2025, a federal jury found her guilty of one felony count of obstructing federal agents and not guilty on a lesser misdemeanor charge of concealing a wanted person. She later resigned. On July 8, 2026, Dugan was sentenced to a US$5,000 fine, but no prison time or probation.

== Career ==
Dugan holds a Bachelor of Arts degree in legal studies from the University of Wisconsin, Madison, and a master's degree in American studies from Boston College. She graduated from the University of Wisconsin Law School in 1987 and taught law courses at Marquette University and the Seattle University School of Law. From 1999 to 2000, Dugan was president of the Milwaukee Bar Association.

Dugan spent much of her career working with legal aid organizations to provide assistance to people who are unable to afford legal representation, and served as the executive director of Catholic Charities of Southeastern Wisconsin from 2006 to 2009. She was active in professional organizations and refereed attorney discipline cases brought by the Wisconsin Office of Lawyer Regulation. Speaking to the Milwaukee Independent in 2016, Dugan stated that she found the judiciary situation in Milwaukee challenging, but believed in the independence of its judges.

Dugan was elected a Wisconsin circuit court judge in 2016, defeating incumbent Paul Rifelj with 65% of the vote. During her tenure, she primarily oversaw cases in the court's misdemeanor division. Dugan was suspended by the Wisconsin Supreme Court in April 2025 after being charged with the federal offenses related to helping an illegal immigrant evade arrest. She faced federal charges of concealing an individual to prevent his discovery and arrest and obstructing or impeding a proceeding.

== 2025 ICE courthouse arrests ==
=== Background ===
From 2019 to February 21, 2025, a federal policy existed for ICE to refrain from making routine arrests at courthouses. On February 21, 2025, an interim guidance was issued by ICE titled "Enforcement Actions in or Near Protected Areas." Under this interim guidance, ICE officers or agents may conduct civil immigration enforcement actions in or near courthouses when they have credible information that leads them to believe the targeted alien(s) is or will be present at a specific location, and where such action is not precluded by laws imposed by the jurisdiction in which the civil immigration enforcement action will take place.

=== Warrant for and arrest of Flores-Ruiz ===
On April 18, 2025, ICE issued an arrest warrant for Eduardo Flores-Ruiz, a 30-year-old illegal immigrant from Mexico accused of misdemeanor battery, who was set to appear in court the same day before Dugan on charges of battery and domestic abuse.

According to an affidavit filed by an FBI agent in support of the criminal complaint against her, Dugan was described as angry when she learned that ICE agents were waiting outside her courtroom to arrest Flores-Ruiz. She then allegedly questioned the agents in the hallway and asked whether they had a judicial warrant. They informed her that they had an administrative warrant to detain Flores-Ruiz. Dugan told the agents that they needed a judicial warrant, not an administrative warrant, and she directed them to speak to Chief Judge Carl Ashley. She then returned to her courtroom.

According to the Milwaukee Journal Sentinel, when Chief Milwaukee County Circuit Judge Carl Ashley notified Dugan of this administrative warrant via email, Dugan responded saying "a warrant was not presented in the hallway on the sixth floor". After Dugan returned to her courtroom, instead of holding the hearing, she told Flores-Ruiz's attorney that his client could attend his next hearing via Zoom and then directed Flores-Ruiz and his attorney to leave using the jury room exit to the public hallway. This alternate exit led through a hallway before opening to the public area where she and the agents had spoken. Flores-Ruiz entered an elevator into which a federal agent also entered. They rode to the main exit from the building and left the building. When Flores-Ruiz began to leave the scene, the ICE agents chased after him and arrested him near the intersection of West State Street and Tenth Street, and Flores-Ruiz was taken to the Dodge Detention Facility in Juneau, Wisconsin. He was eventually deported.

=== Arrest of Dugan ===
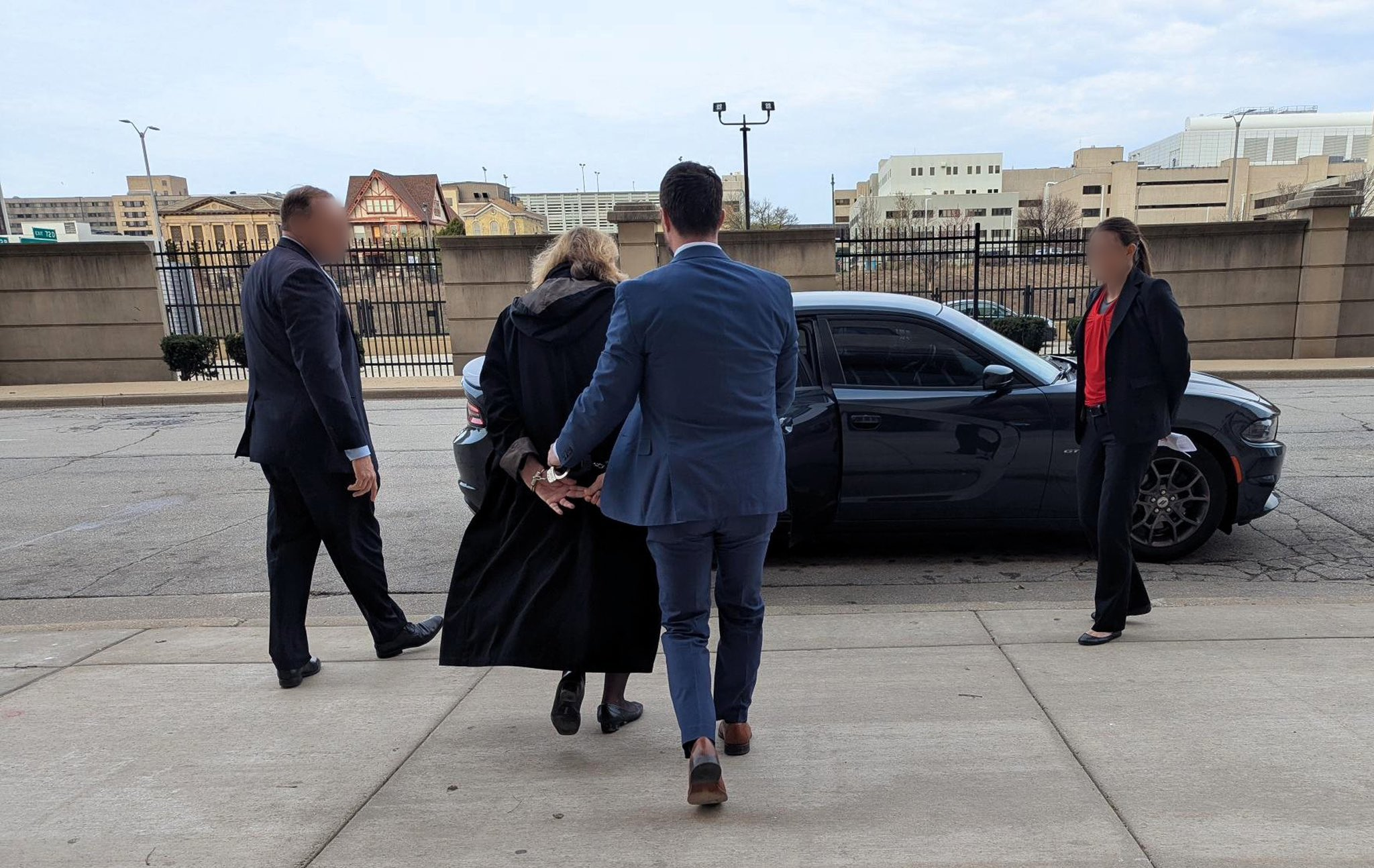
Arrest of Dugan by FBI agents, April 2025

The FBI subsequently opened an investigation into whether Dugan helped an illegal immigrant avoid arrest. Dugan was arrested by FBI agents on April 25, 2025, and charged with two felony counts of obstruction and concealing an individual, and she was jailed. She was released on her own recognizance later that day. FBI Director Kash Patel announced the arrest in a social media post on X, stating that Dugan had "intentionally misdirected federal agents away from the subject to be arrested in her courthouse". He deleted the post shortly thereafter, but subsequently restored the post. United States Attorney General Pam Bondi also spoke publicly in support of the arrest of Dugan.

==== Reactions to arrest ====
Republican lawmakers applauded the arrest. Former Wisconsin Governor Scott Walker called on Republican leaders of the Wisconsin Legislature to convene an extraordinary session to impeach and remove Dugan from office. United States Attorney General Pam Bondi stated that judiciary members obstructing immigration enforcement would face prosecution: "If you are harboring a fugitive, we don't care who you are. ... We will come after you and we will prosecute you."

Dugan's arrest was condemned by Democratic lawmakers. U.S. Senator Tammy Baldwin accused President Donald Trump of attacking democratic values, saying that the arrest threatens to breach the separation of powers. Milwaukee Mayor Cavalier Johnson said that aggressive federal interference at the Milwaukee County Courthouse was having a detrimental effect on normal legal processes.

The Milwaukee Journal Sentinel reported that five legal experts, including former federal prosecutors, did not believe Dugan should be charged with a federal crime. More than 150 former state and federal judges called Dugan's arrest an attempt to intimidate the courts. Retired Massachusetts Supreme Court justice Geraldine Hines commented that the prosecution was "an effort to intimidate judges". Protests were held outside the U.S. Courthouse in Milwaukee on April 25 and the FBI field office in St. Francis on April 26.

=== Arraignment and indictment ===
FBI charging document

Dugan was brought before U.S. Magistrate Judge Stephen C. Dries that morning for arraignment and she made no public comments, but her attorney told the court that Dugan "wholeheartedly regrets and protests her arrest. It was not made in the interest of public safety." Following her initial hearing, Dugan hired former U.S. Attorney Steven M. Biskupic and former U.S. Solicitor General Paul Clement to represent her.

Chief Judge Carl Ashley said in a statement that Dugan's caseload would be handled by another jurist in the courthouse and declined to comment further. A reserve judge would be appointed to take over Dugan's caseload. On April 29, 2025, the Wisconsin Supreme Court issued an order relieving Dugan of her duties during the length of her federal trial. On May 13, 2025, Dugan was indicted by a federal grand jury for concealing a person from arrest and obstruction of proceedings. On November 7, 2025, prosecutors submitted evidence to the defense for the upcoming trial. Included in the latest filing was a reference to another judge who said she was uncomfortable when Judge Dugan brought her along to confront an arrest team waiting in the hallway for Eduardo Flores Ruiz.

=== Defense motion to dismiss ===
On May 14, Dugan's attorneys moved to dismiss the case, on the basis of judicial immunity, official acts, and the Tenth Amendment. They wrote, "The government's prosecution of Judge Dugan is virtually unprecedented and entirely unconstitutional". To support their position they cited the 2024 U.S. Supreme court decision Trump v. United States. They asserted that the decision provides immunity to Judge Dugan for all official acts within her exclusive constitutional authority. These official acts include directing someone where to go within her courtroom.

On May 30, 138 retired state and federal judges filed an amicus brief, stating that Dugan "is entitled to absolute immunity for her official acts", and that the court should dismiss the charges against her. They characterized the prosecution as an "egregious overreach by the executive branch" that "would create a chilling effect on judges" if allowed to proceed, and that "threatens public trust in the judicial system and the ability of the public to avail themselves of courthouses without fear of reprisal". On August 26, Judge Lynn Adelman declined to dismiss the charges, and trial was set for December 15. Flores-Ruiz was deported in November 2025 after pleading no contest to the battery charge and being sentenced to time served.

=== Trial ===
Dugan's trial began on December 15, 2025, in federal court in Milwaukee before Judge Lynn Adelman. In opening statements, Assistant U.S. Attorney Keith Alexander told jurors that Dugan said she would "take the heat" for directing Flores-Ruiz through a private courtroom door while federal agents were waiting to arrest him.

Defense attorney Steven M. Biskupic argued that Dugan had no intention of obstructing agents and was following courthouse policy when she directed them to speak with Chief Judge Carl Ashley. He noted that other agents still in the hallway chose not to arrest Flores-Ruiz when he emerged through the door, instead following him outside the building, stating, "Now, after the fact, everyone wants to blame Judge Dugan."

The government's case was expected to include testimony from approximately two dozen witnesses. The first witness was FBI agent Erin Lucker, who explained video footage showing the courthouse's back corridors. On December 18, Dugan was found guilty of a felony count of obstructing federal agents and not guilty on a lesser misdemeanor charge of concealing a wanted person.

=== Resignation ===
On January 3, 2026, Dugan resigned as a Wisconsin circuit court judge in a letter to Wisconsin Governor Tony Evers. In the letter, she said the federal case against her was ongoing and argued it raised concerns about judicial independence, but said Milwaukee County "deserve[s] to start the year with a judge on the bench" rather than have the court's leadership become part of a partisan fight in the legislature. Evers' office said he would move to fill the vacancy without delay. Republican Assembly Speaker Robin Vos praised the resignation, which came after Republican lawmakers had threatened impeachment following her conviction.

=== Appeal ===
On June 16, 2026, the obstruction of justice verdict was upheld by U.S. District Judge Adelman, declining the appeal of Dugan's 2025 felony conviction.

=== Sentence ===
On July 8, 2026, Adelman spared prison time, stating "The defendant is 67 years old with no prior record. I don't think she has any correctional services needs. She has a lifetime of service to others. This is a person who has done a lot of good in our community. This is a situation where an otherwise good person made a bad decision in the moment." However, Adelman would order Dugan to pay a $5,000 fine.

== Electoral history ==
=== Wisconsin circuit courts (2016, 2022) ===
Year	Election	Date	Elected				Defeated				Total	Plurality
2016	General	April 5	Hannah C. Dugan	Nonpartisan	132,461	64.90%	Paul Rifelj (inc)	Non.	70,098	34.35%	204,088	62,363
2022	General	April 5	Hannah C. Dugan (inc)	Nonpartisan	89,206	98.42%	—unopposed—				90,640	

== See also ==
- Judicial independence
- United States v. Joseph (2019)
