= United States v. Joseph =

United States v. Joseph may refer to

- United States v. Joseph (1876), United States Supreme Court Case
- United States v. Joseph (2019), Massachusetts Court Case
