= 2012 Milwaukee mayoral election =

- April 3, 2012
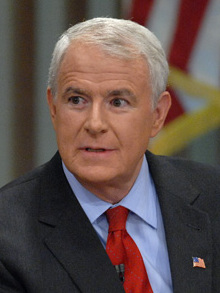

Candidate	Tom Barrett	Edward McDonald
Popular vote	54,640	22,388
Percentage	70.46%	28.87%
Mayor before election
Tom Barrett
Elected mayor
Tom Barrett

The 2012 Milwaukee mayoral election was held on Tuesday, April 3, 2012, to elect the mayor for Milwaukee. Incumbent mayor Tom Barrett was elected to a third term, defeating Edward McDonald.

== Logistics ==
The election coincided with other municipal elections, including an unopposed re-election bid for Milwaukee County Executive Chris Abele and contested elections for City Comptroller, City Treasurer, and the Common Council.

Municipal elections in Wisconsin are non-partisan. The non-partisan primary was held on Tuesday, February 21, 2012, to narrow the field of candidates to two.

== Primary election ==
=== Candidates ===
- Tom Barrett, incumbent mayor
- Ieshuh Griffin, community activist and frequent candidate
- Edward McDonald, faculty member of the University of Wisconsin–Extension and community activist

==== Declined ====
- Bill Wenz, former real estate broker

=== Results ===
Non-partisan primary results, February 21, 2012
Candidate	Votes	%
Tom Barrett	27,835	80.56
Edward C. McDonald	5,224	15.12
Ieshuh Griffin	1,148	3.32
Write-In	346	1.00
Total votes	34,553	100
Turnout	34,553	11.67%

== General election ==
=== Candidates ===
- Tom Barrett, incumbent mayor
- Edward McDonald, faculty member of the University of Wisconsin–Extension and community activist

=== Results ===
General election results, April 3, 2012
Candidate	Votes	%
Tom Barrett	54,640	70.46
Edward C. McDonald	22,388	28.87
Write-In	517	0.67
Total votes	77,545	100

Barrett announced on March 30, 2012, that he would run in the Democratic primary for Governor in the recall election to face incumbent Scott Walker; he subsequently lost.
