= Government of Milwaukee =

Urban government in Wisconsin

The municipal government of the city of Milwaukee, Wisconsin, headquartered at the Milwaukee City Hall, is organized under a mayor and common council system. Traditionally supporting progressive politicians and movements, this community has consistently proved to be a stronghold of the Democratic Party. As the largest city in Wisconsin, Milwaukee receives a significant amount of attention during elections.

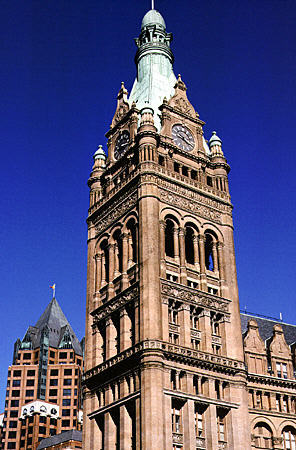
Milwaukee City Hall

== History ==
Beginning with the city's first major wave of German immigrants, the 48ers, Milwaukee has traditionally supported progressive politicians and movements. It was a Republican stronghold during the American Civil War and, like most major cities, experienced a period of massive corruption and machine-boss politics. This ended in 1910 when the voters elected its first of three socialist mayors.

Since 1960, Milwaukee has been a stronghold of the Democratic Party both locally and nationally, but the city is largely divided between different factions of Democrats. Such was the case when, during the 2004 mayoral election, a Milwaukee radio station received a phone call originating from a number at the Wisconsin Democratic Headquarters in Madison. Many supporters of Marvin Pratt saw this as confirmation that the party was showing favoritism toward rival Tom Barrett. (Though the election was non-partisan, both candidates were registered Democrats.) The call was later explained to have come from an independent organization calling from within the headquarters building.

During the 1970s, Milwaukee was home to an active chapter of the Black Panther Party for Self Defense. The chapter was one of the few in which no members were ever killed by the police. In addition to being the catalyst for many civil-rights victories during the era, it also set up a number of community-based organizations that are still active today, such as the Hunger Task Force.

Third party politics has played an important part in Milwaukee city government. While Milwaukee's elected representatives are currently elected on a non-partisan basis, the city has a deep history that includes past election of three socialist mayors (the last being Frank Zeidler, who served from 1948 to 1960), as well as a number of former socialist representatives to the Common Council. Milwaukee's brand of socialism was often referred to as sewer socialism, in that its adherents did not espouse radical revolutionary theories, but emphasized honest government, an expanded city role in public works projects and annexation of then unincorporated communities surrounding Milwaukee. While influential in city politics in the first half of the twentieth century, Socialist party influence on city government waned by mid-century and was non-existent by the departure of Frank Zeidler from office. In recent years, Milwaukee has played host to national conventions for the Socialist Party USA (1997), Communist Party USA (2001) and the Green Party of the United States (2004).

== City government ==
Milwaukee has a mayor-council form of government with a strong-mayor plan. The city underwent a transition from a civil service to a cabinet form of governance in 1988, following the election of then mayor John Norquist. While this gave the mayor greater control of the day-to-day operations of the city, the Common Council retains almost complete control over the city's finances and the mayor, with the exception of his proposed annual budget, cannot directly introduce legislation. A Common Council of 15 elected members, called aldermen, each represent one of the 15 districts in the city. The city is also served by independently elected city attorney, comptroller and treasurer positions that are not under the mayor or Common Council's tutelage. The mayor and Common Council retain control over their departmental budgets, however.

All elected positions in the city of Milwaukee government serve four-year terms, with elections held in the spring of presidential voting years. The mayor, city attorney, comptroller and treasurer are all elected on a citywide basis.

=== Mayor ===
The mayor of Milwaukee is Cavalier Johnson. He was first elected in 2022 after the previous mayor, Tom Barrett, was appointed by president Joe Biden to serve as the United States Ambassador to Luxembourg. He was reelected in 2024.

=== Common Council ===
The Milwaukee Common Council is the lawmaking body of the city of Milwaukee. It comprises 15 members from 15 council districts throughout the city. As of 1960, membership on the Common Council was considered more desirable than membership in the Wisconsin State Assembly, and incumbent legislators would often seek a position on the council, resigning their legislative positions if they were victorious. The Common Council exercises all policy-making and legislative powers of the city, including the adoption of ordinances and resolutions, the approval of the city's annual budget, and the enactment of appropriation and tax levy ordinances. The council also has approval over the mayor's appointments of cabinet heads to direct day-to-day operations of city departments. In addition to their powers as legislators, council members serve as de facto district administrators, responsible to the citizens in their districts for city services. On April 19, 2022, 12th district councilmember José G. Pérez was elected council president to succeed Cavalier Johnson, who took office as mayor.

Common Council members: Larresa Taylor, José G. Pérez, Robert Bauman, Marina Dimitrijevic, Andrea Pratt, JoCasta Zamarripa, and Sharlen Moore.

All members of the Common Council serve on a nonpartisan basis.

District	Member	Took office
1	Andrea Pratt	April 18, 2023
2	Mark Chambers Jr.	November 15, 2022
3	Alex Brower	April 22, 2025
4	Robert Bauman	April 20, 2004
5	Lamont T. Westmoreland	April 18, 2023
6	Milele A. Coggs	April 15, 2008
7	DiAndre Jackson	April 16, 2024
8	JoCasta Zamarripa	April 21, 2020
9	Larresa Taylor	April 18, 2023
10	Sharlen Moore	April 16, 2024
11	Peter Burgelis	April 16, 2024
12	José G. Pérez	April 17, 2012
13	Scott Spiker	August 20, 2019
14	Marina Dimitrijevic	April 21, 2020
15	Russell W. Stamper	April 15, 2014

== City Agencies ==
The government of the city of Milwaukee is divided into six primary categories. They are Elected Officials and Administration; Health, Safety and Services; Arts and Architecture; Business and Development; Judicial and Oversight; and Jobs and Employees.

=== Boards and commissions ===
The City of Milwaukee Youth Council, the city's youth commission, represents the student voice to the Common Council and Mayor.

== State and federal representation ==
The city of Milwaukee has three full Wisconsin Senate districts within city boundaries, as well as four other districts that share a significant portion of their boundaries with Milwaukee's suburbs. In Wisconsin, each Senate district is composed of three Wisconsin State Assembly districts. Given Milwaukee's status as a Democratic Party stronghold, all but three Senate and three Assembly districts in the city are represented by Democrats, with all six Republican seats falling in three small overlapping areas on the periphery of the city.

For most of the past century Milwaukee was represented by multiple congressional districts. With the city's slowly shrinking population since 1970 and Wisconsin's slower population growth rate that cost the state a congressional seat in 2002, Milwaukee has been represented by only one congressional district since that time. Milwaukee makes up the overwhelming majority of Wisconsin's 4th congressional district. Because of the district's record as a Democratic Party stronghold, the Democratic primary election for the seat is often considered more important than the general election. The seat is currently held by Gwen Moore, Wisconsin's first African-American congresswoman.
