= Bob Donovan =

American politician (born 1956)

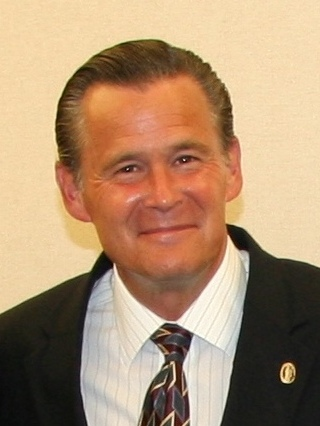
- Donovan in 2009

Member of the Wisconsin State Assembly
- Incumbent
- Assumed office January 6, 2025
- Preceded by: Amanda Nedweski
- Constituency: 61st district
- In office January 3, 2023 – January 6, 2025
- Preceded by: Mike Kuglitsch
- Succeeded by: Chuck Wichgers
- Constituency: 84th district

Member of the Milwaukee Common Council from the 8th district
- In office April 18, 2000 – April 21, 2020
- Preceded by: Wayne P. Frank
- Succeeded by: JoCasta Zamarripa

Personal details
- Born: May 4, 1956 (age 70) Milwaukee, Wisconsin, U.S.
- Party: Republican
- Spouse: Kathy Donovan (m. 1985)
- Children: 5
- Education: Saint Francis de Sales Seminary; University of Wisconsin–Milwaukee
- Occupation: Politician
- Website: Campaign website

Robert G. "Bob" Donovan (born May 4, 1956) is an American Republican politician from Milwaukee County, Wisconsin. He is a member of the Wisconsin State Assembly, representing Wisconsin's 61st Assembly district since 2025; he previously represented the 84th Assembly district during the 2023–2024 term. Before his election to the Assembly, he served 20 years on the Milwaukee Common Council and was an unsuccessful candidate for mayor of Milwaukee in 2016 and 2022.

== Early life and career ==
Bob Donovan was born and raised in the Jackson Park neighborhood of Milwaukee, Wisconsin, and graduated from Saint Thomas More High School. Donovan comes from a Catholic family, and originally planned to become a priest after high school. He entered Saint Francis de Sales Seminary but left after a year. He then attended the University of Wisconsin–Milwaukee for two years, intending to become a teacher, but also left without completing his degree. During his college years, he had worked as a laborer during the summers at Milwaukee Solvay Coke & Gas Co., a coal processing plant. After leaving UWM, he decided to focus on this work and became a supervisor and later plant foreman. Milwaukee Solvay Coke went out of business in 1983 and Donovan worked a number of jobs in the years after, including security officer at Southridge Mall and later for a pest control company.

== Political career ==
=== Early campaigns ===
Donovan first entered politics as a Republican candidate in 1982, challenging incumbent Democratic state representative Joseph Czarnezki in what was then the 17th Assembly district. Czarnezki easily won the election, receiving 76% of the vote in the heavily Democratic district. A few months after the election, however, Czarnezki won a special election for Wisconsin Senate, and a new special election was called in the 17th Assembly district. Donovan ran again, and fared a bit better in the lower turnout special election, but still received only 33% of the vote.

Donovan says he was drawn to the Republican Party by Ronald Reagan, but later admitted that this experience taught him that he didn't want to be labeled as a Republican if he wanted to be successful in Milwaukee politics. He therefore described himself as nonpartisan for most of the next forty years.

=== Milwaukee Common Council ===
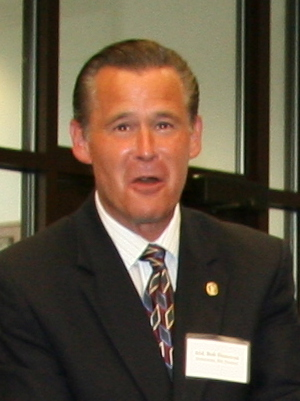
Donovan in 2009

In the late 1980s and 1990s, Donovan became involved in neighborhood associations, such as the Southside Organizing Committee and the Layton Boulevard West Neighbors Association. These groups saw their neighborhoods in decline, and were upset about the rising number of renters displacing homeowners. They also saw their alderman, Wayne P. Frank, as unresponsive to their concerns. Donovan decided to challenge Frank for his seat on the city council, but his 1996 campaign failed to make the ballot due to invalid nomination forms. He ran as a write-in candidate and came close to winning. Four years later, Frank chose not to run for an 8th term, and Donovan won the election to succeed him.

In the 2000 election, however, his opponent, G. Eddie Paez, brought up a previously unknown 1992 incident when Donovan was arrested and fined for peeping through a hole in a partition between two stalls in a men's room on the UWM campus. According to the police report, Donovan told the arresting officer he'd frequented the restroom for years "for the purpose of either watching men masturbate, or to have sex with men in the restroom." During the 2000 campaign, Donovan denied he made the statement and said he just noticed the person in the next stall was "acting suspicious".

As alderman, Donovan took the unusual step of opening up a district office, funded by local businesses and staffed by volunteers. He also founded a nonprofit, the Milwaukee Alliance, which launched the south side's community prosecution unit to address neighborhood issues like absentee landlords or nuisance properties.

Donovan stepped down from Milwaukee Alliance after the United States Attorney, Steven M. Biskupic, began looking into federal funding he had secured for the nonprofit. Ultimately, Donovan was indicted for fraud and making false statements to the United States Department of Housing and Urban Development. At issue were several payments from the nonprofit to Donovan's wife and falsified records to hide the payments. Also at issue was the close intermingling of Donovan's campaign apparatus and the nonprofit's employees and funds. Ultimately, Biskupic agreed to drop the charges after Donovan paid a fee to the city. The deal also prohibited Donovan from any involvement in federally-funded groups for the next two years, and required him to cut all ties with the Milwaukee Alliance. The organization ceased to exist less than a year later.

Donovan was ultimately re-elected four times as alderman for the 8th district. Because of his relatively unique conservative politics in the city government, Donovan's office became a hub for conservatives in the city seeking constituent services—even those outside of his aldermanic district. Donovan has frequently been at-odds with his mostly Democratic colleagues in the Milwaukee Common Council, and was described as having a "large ego" and "pandering". He announced in March 2019 that he would retire in 2020. He subsequently moved to the neighboring suburban city of Greenfield, Wisconsin.

=== Mayoral races ===
Donovan launched his first bid for mayor of Milwaukee in 2015, challenging three-term incumbent mayor Tom Barrett in the 2016 election. Wisconsin's mayoral races are nonpartisan, but Milwaukee Democrats sought to clearly tie Donovan to the Republican establishment. They described Donovan as having "Scott Walker's ideas and Donald Trump's erratic behavior," and pointed out Donovan's frequent collaboration with Republican state legislators. Donovan's past run-ins with the law were again brought up in the 2016 campaign. Donovan ran on an anti-crime platform with the endorsement of Milwaukee's police and firefighters' unions. Donovan was also a long-time opponent of the planned Milwaukee Streetcar. Barrett easily prevailed with 70% of the vote in the Spring general election, in line with his previous two mayoral campaigns.

Five years later, in 2021, Barrett resigned to accept an appointment as U.S. Ambassador to Luxembourg. A special mayoral election was set to be held concurrent with the 2022 Spring election. Donovan again chose to enter the race, despite Milwaukee no longer being his primary residence. He stood out in a crowded primary field as the only conservative candidate, and again ran on an anti-crime platform, calling for more police and tougher penalties for criminals. The final vote was also nearly identical to his previous run, and interim mayor Cavalier Johnson became Milwaukee's first black mayor, receiving 71% of the vote.

=== Wisconsin Legislature ===
Around the time of the Spring 2022 election, the Wisconsin Supreme Court issued its decision in the case of Billie Johnson v. Wisconsin Elections Commission, setting new district maps for the Wisconsin Legislature. Six-term incumbent state representative Mike Kuglitsch was drawn out of the 84th Assembly district, creating an open seat. Within two weeks, Donovan declared his candidacy in the new 84th Assembly district. He faced two opponents in the Republican primary, but easily won with 72% of the vote. He faced Democrat Lu Ann Bird in the general election, a former Whitnall School District board member from Hales Corners, Wisconsin. The 84th district race was one of the closest elections in the state in 2022, and Donovan ultimately prevailed by a margin of 526 votes.

Following the 2024 redistricting, Donovan was drawn out of the 84th Assembly district and into the new 7th Assembly district. Donovan subsequently announced he would relocate to run instead in the redrawn 61st Assembly district. The 61st district, comprising the villages of Greendale and Hales Corners, most of the city of Greenfield, and a small part of southwest Milwaukee, was projected to be one of the most competitive Assembly districts under the new maps.

== Personal life and family ==
Bob Donovan married his wife Kathy in 1985. They met while he was working as a security officer at Southridge mall—she was working at a clothing store. They had two children together and Kathy brought three children from her previous marriage, all are now grown. Bob and Kathy reside in Greenfield, Wisconsin.

== Electoral history ==
=== Wisconsin Assembly, 17th district (1982, 1983) ===
Year	Election	Date	Elected				Defeated				Total	Plurality
1982	General	Nov. 2	Joseph Czarnezki	Democratic	13,430	76.04%	Robert G. Donovan	Rep.	4,232	23.96%	17,662	9,198
1983	Special	Jun. 28	Peggy Krusick	Democratic	3,159	66.84%	Robert G. Donovan	Rep.	1,567	33.16%	4,726	1,592

=== Milwaukee Mayor (2016) ===
Milwaukee Mayoral Election, 2016
Party	Candidate	Votes	%	±%
Nonpartisan Primary, February 16, 2016 (top two)
Nonpartisan	Tom Barrett (incumbent)	30,239	46.14%	
Nonpartisan	Bob Donavan	21,261	32.44%	
Nonpartisan	Joe Davis Sr.	12,132	18.51%	
Nonpartisan	James B. Methu	1,755	2.68%	
Write-in		147	0.22%	
Total votes		65,534	100.0%	
General Election, April 5, 2016
Nonpartisan	Tom Barrett (incumbent)	110,437	69.95%	−0.51%
Nonpartisan	Bob Donavan	46,957	29.74%	
Write-in		475	0.30%	
Plurality		63,480	40.21%	-1.38%
Total votes		157,869	100.0%	+103.58%

=== Milwaukee Mayor (2022) ===
Milwaukee Mayoral Special Election, 2022
Party	Candidate	Votes	%	±%
Nonpartisan Primary, February 15, 2022 (top two)
Nonpartisan	Cavalier Johnson (incumbent)	25,779	41.79%	
Nonpartisan	Bob Donovan	13,742	22.28%	
Nonpartisan	Lena Taylor	7,877	12.77%	
Nonpartisan	Marina Dimitrijevic	7,521	12.19%	
Nonpartisan	Earnell Lucas	5,886	9.53%	
Nonpartisan	Michael Sampson	514	0.83%	
Nonpartisan	Ieshuh Griffin	315	0.51%	
Write-in		56	0.09%	
Total votes		61,743	100.00%	
General Election, April 5, 2022
Nonpartisan	Cavalier Johnson (incumbent)	62,143	71.51%	
Nonpartisan	Bob Donavan	24,543	28.24%	
Write-in		215	0.25%	
Plurality		37,600	43.27%	+17.24%
Total votes		86,901	100.0%	-5.46%

=== Wisconsin Assembly, 84th district (2022) ===
Year	Election	Date	Elected				Defeated				Total	Plurality
2022	Primary	Aug. 9	Bob Donavan	Republican	4,887	72.53%	David Karst	Rep.	1,384	20.54%	6,738	3,503
2022	Primary	Aug. 9	Bob Donavan	Republican	4,887	72.53%	Laura Barker	Rep.	459	6.81%	6,738	3,503
2022	General	Nov. 8	Bob Donavan	Republican	13,179	50.98%	Lu Ann Bird	Dem.	12,653	48.95%	25,849	526

=== Wisconsin Assembly, 61st district (2024) ===
Year	Election	Date	Elected				Defeated				Total	Plurality
2024	Primary	Aug. 13	Bob Donavan	Republican	5,281	92.62%	Martin Tontoe Gomez	Rep.	413	7.24%	5,702	4,868
2024	General	Nov. 5	Bob Donavan	Republican	17,618	51.54%	Lu Ann Bird	Dem.	16,511	48.30%	34,183	1,107

Wisconsin State Assembly
Preceded by Mike Kuglitsch	Member of the Wisconsin State Assembly from the 84th district January 3, 2023 – January 6, 2025	Succeeded by Chuck Wichgers
Preceded by Amanda Nedweski	Member of the Wisconsin State Assembly from the 61st district January 6, 2025 – present	Incumbent
