= Wisconsin's 84th Assembly district =

American legislative district in southeast Wisconsin

Wisconsin's 84th State Assembly district
- 2024 map defined in 2023 Wisc. Act 94; 2022 map defined in Johnson v. Wisconsin Elections Commission; 2011 map was defined in 2011 Wisc. Act 43
Assemblymember
Chuck Wichgers; R–Muskego
since January 6, 2025 (1 year, 52 days)
- Demographics: 93.29% White; 0.49% Black; 2.67% Hispanic; 1.27% Asian; 1.34% Native American; 0.08% Hawaiian/Pacific Islander
- Population (2020) • Voting age: 59,218; 45,911
- Website: Official website
- Notes: Southeast Wisconsin

The 84th Assembly district of Wisconsin is one of 99 districts in the Wisconsin State Assembly. Located in southeast Wisconsin, the district comprises part of southeast Waukesha County and northwest Racine County. It includes the villages of Big Bend, Mukwonago, Vernon, and Waterford, and most of the city of Muskego. The district is represented by Republican Chuck Wichgers, since January 2025; Wichgers previously represented the 82nd district from 2023 to 2025 and the 83rd district from 2017 to 2023.

The 84th Assembly district is located within Wisconsin's 28th Senate district, along with the 82nd and 83rd Assembly districts.

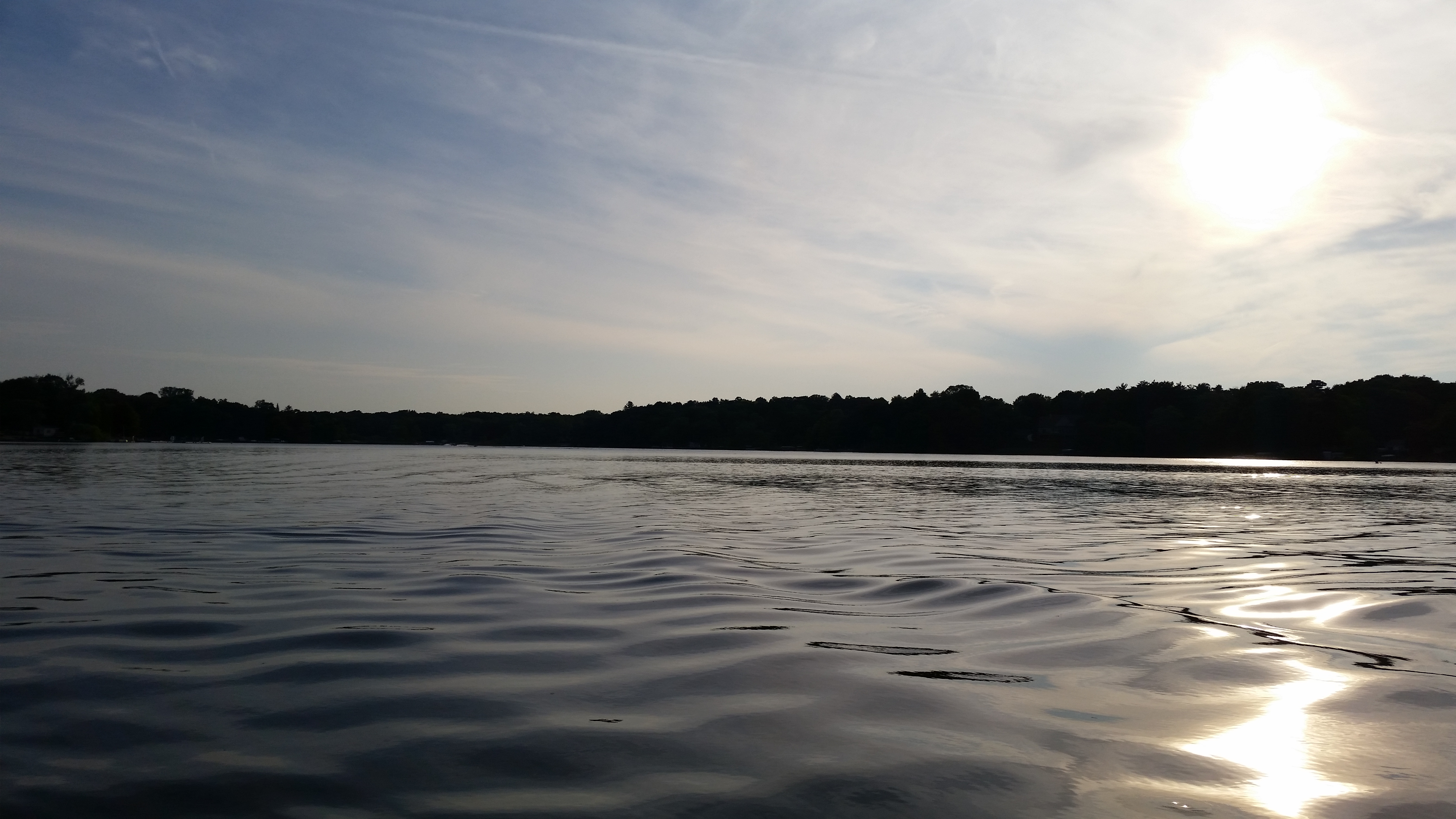
Upper Phantom Lake in Mukwonago

== List of past representatives ==
List of representatives to the Wisconsin State Assembly from the 84th district
Member	Party	Residence	Counties represented	Term start	Term end	Ref.
District created
John M. Alberts	Rep.	Oconomowoc	Jefferson, Waukesha	January 1, 1973	January 6, 1975	
Harry G. Snyder	Rep.	Oconomowoc	Jefferson, Waukesha	January 6, 1975	December 17, 1981	
--Vacant--			Jefferson, Waukesha	December 8, 1980	April 15, 1981	
John M. Alberts	Rep.	Oconomowoc	Jefferson, Waukesha	April 15, 1981	January 3, 1983	
Sharon Metz	Dem.	Green Bay	Brown	January 3, 1983	January 7, 1985	
John C. Schober	Rep.	New Berlin	Waukesha	January 7, 1985	January 2, 1989	
Marc C. Duff	Rep.	New Berlin	Waukesha	January 2, 1989	January 4, 1993	
Mary Lazich	Rep.	New Berlin	Milwaukee, Waukesha	January 4, 1993	April 20, 1998	
--Vacant--			Milwaukee, Waukesha	April 20, 1998	January 4, 1999	
Mark Gundrum	Rep.	New Berlin	Milwaukee, Waukesha	January 4, 1999	July 31, 2010	
--Vacant--			Milwaukee, Waukesha	July 31, 2010	January 2, 2011	
Mike Kuglitsch	Rep.	New Berlin	Milwaukee, Waukesha	January 2, 2011	January 2, 2023	
Bob Donovan	Rep.	Greenfield	Milwaukee	January 3, 2023	January 6, 2025	
Chuck Wichgers	Rep.	Muskego	Racine, Walworth, Waukesha	January 6, 2025	Current	
