= 2024 Milwaukee mayoral election =

- April 2, 2024

Candidate	Cavalier Johnson	David King
Popular vote	64,536	14,639
Percentage	81.51%	18.49%
- Precinct results Johnson: 50–60% 60–70% 70–80% 80–90% >90% King: 40–50% No votes
Mayor before election
Cavalier Johnson
Elected mayor
Cavalier Johnson

The 2024 Milwaukee mayoral election was held on April 2, 2024, concurrent with other elections during Wisconsin's spring elections, to elect the mayor of Milwaukee, Wisconsin. Incumbent Mayor Cavalier Johnson sought re-election. Johnson won in the largest landslide victory since the 2008 Milwaukee mayoral election.

Municipal elections in Wisconsin are nonpartisan. However, all of the candidates in the election were individually affiliated with the Democratic Party.

== Candidates ==
=== Advanced to general ===
- Cavalier Johnson, incumbent mayor
- David King, pastor

=== Eliminated in primary ===
- Ieshuh Griffin, perennial candidate

== Primary election ==
=== Endorsements ===
Cavalier Johnson

Organizations

- Wisconsin AFL-CIO

2024 Milwaukee mayoral primary
Candidate	Votes	%
Cavalier Johnson (incumbent)	26,798	86.70
David King	3,018	9.76
Ieshuh Griffin	1,094	3.54
Total votes	30,910	100

== General election ==
=== Results ===
2024 Milwaukee mayoral general election
Candidate	Votes	%
Cavalier Johnson (incumbent)	64,536	81.51
David King	14,639	18.49
Total votes	79,175	100
