= Mike Kuglitsch =

American politician and legislator

Member of the Wisconsin State Assembly from the 84th district
- In office January 3, 2011 – May 19, 2022
- Preceded by: Mark Gundrum
- Succeeded by: Bob Donovan

Personal details
- Born: February 3, 1960 (age 66) Milwaukee, Wisconsin
- Party: Republican
- Spouse: Stephanie Kuglitsch
- Education: University of Wisconsin–Whitewater
- Profession: Politician
- Website: Official website

Mike Kuglitsch (born February 3, 1960) is an American consultant and Republican politician from Waukesha County, Wisconsin. He was a member of the Wisconsin State Assembly for six terms, representing the 84th district from 2011 through 2022.

== Biography ==
Born in Milwaukee, Wisconsin, Kuglitsch graduated from the University of Wisconsin–Whitewater in 1983. He has held leadership roles in the New Berlin Chamber of Commerce, and the Wisconsin Restaurant Association. He was elected to the Wisconsin State Assembly in 2010. He announced on February 24, 2022, that he would retire.

Wisconsin State Assembly
Preceded by Mark Gundrum	Member of the Wisconsin State Assembly from the 84th district January 3, 2011 – May 19, 2022	Succeeded by Bob Donovan
