= Stephen C. Dries =

Magistrate Judge for United States District Court for the Eastern District of Wisconsin

Stephen C. Dries is a Magistrate Judge for United States District Court for the Eastern District of Wisconsin.

Dries served as Clerk of the Eastern District court for three years before being chosen by the district judges in 2020 as a U.S. Magistrate Judge. Before that, he practiced at the Jenner & Block law firm and was a law clerk to two federal judges. Dries received his J.D. in 2001 from the University of Wisconsin, Madison, and is a 1998 graduate of Georgetown University.

== Important cases ==
Local county court judge Hannah Dugan appeared before Dries for a hearing on April 25, 2025, at the federal courthouse in Milwaukee facing federal charges of obstructing an ICE arrest, founded on a complaint and warrant Dries had approved.
