= 2016 Milwaukee mayoral election =

- April 5, 2016
- Turnout: 53.23%
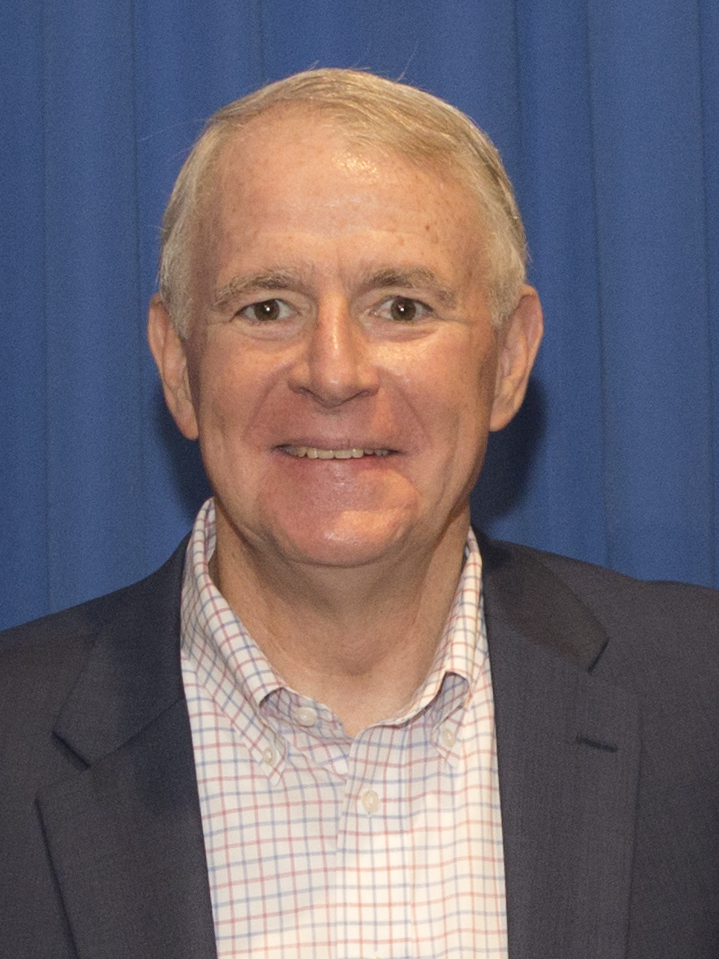

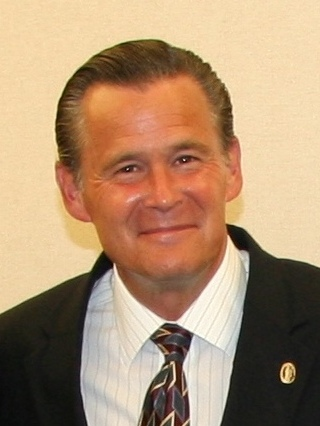
Candidate	Tom Barrett	Bob Donovan
Popular vote	110,437	46,957
Percentage	69.95%	29.74%
Mayor before election
Tom Barrett
Elected mayor
Tom Barrett

The 2016 Milwaukee mayoral election was held on Tuesday, April 5, 2016, to elect the mayor for Milwaukee. Incumbent mayor Tom Barrett was elected to a fourth term, defeating Bob Donovan.

Municipal elections in Wisconsin are non-partisan. The non-partisan primary was held on Tuesday, February 16, 2016, to narrow the field of candidates to two.

== Primary election ==
=== Candidates ===
- Tom Barrett, incumbent
- Bob Donovan, District 8 Alderman
- Joe Davis, District 2 Alderman
- James Methu, journalist

=== Results ===
Non-partisan primary results, February 16, 2016
Candidate	Votes	%
Tom Barrett	30,239	46.14
Bob Donovan	21,261	32.44
Joe Davis	12,132	18.51
James Methu	1,755	2.68
Write-In	147	0.22
Total votes	65,534	100
Turnout	{{{votes}}}	20.58%

== General election ==
=== Candidates ===
- Tom Barrett, incumbent
- Bob Donovan, District 8 Alderman

=== Endorsements ===
Tom Barrett
- American Federation of State, County and Municipal Employees
- Herb Kohl, former US States Senator
- James Methu, former candidate for mayor
- Gwen Moore, US congresswoman
- Barack Obama, President of the United States
- United Steelworkers
Bob Donovan
- David Clarke, Milwaukee Sheriff
- Joe Davis, alderman and former candidate for mayor
- Milwaukee Police Association
- Milwaukee Professional Fire Fighters Association

=== Results ===
General election results, April 5, 2016
Candidate	Votes	%
Tom Barrett	110,437	69.95
Bob Donovan	46,957	29.74
Write-In	475	0.30
Total votes	157,869	100
Turnout	{{{votes}}}	53.23%
