= United States v. Joseph (2019) =

US prosecution of a judge for allegedly helping an undocumented immigrant evade detention

United States v. Shelley M. Richmond Joseph and Wesley MacGregor
- Court: United States District Court for the District of Massachusetts

United States v. Shelley M. Richmond Joseph and Wesley MacGregor (2019) was the federal criminal prosecution of a Massachusetts state court judge (Joseph) and court officer (MacGregor) for allegedly helping a state court defendant evade federal immigration authorities by allowing him to leave a court hearing through a rear door of the courthouse. Both were charged with conspiracy to obstruct justice, aiding and abetting obstruction of justice, and aiding and abetting obstruction of a federal proceeding; MacGregor was also charged with perjury during grand jury proceedings. Joseph faced 20 years in prison; MacGregor, 30 years. Both could have been fined $250,000. On September 22, 2022, the case concluded with an announcement by federal prosecutors that the obstruction charges against both Joseph and MacGregor would be dismissed and that prosecution of the perjury charge against MacGregor would be deferred. As part of the resolution, Joseph agreed to submit to disciplinary proceedings before the Massachusetts Commission on Judicial Conduct. In December 2024, the Commission filed formal charges against Joseph with the Massachusetts Supreme Judicial Court, alleging that her conduct was "unbecoming a judicial officer". The Commission accused Joseph of violating the Massachusetts Code of Judicial Conduct by failing to comply with the law, and alleged that she engaged in conduct "prejudicial to the administration of justice."

On April 2, 2018, an agent from U.S. Immigration and Customs Enforcement (ICE) arrived at the Newton District Court in Newton, Massachusetts in order to detain a suspected undocumented immigrant who was appearing as a defendant that day on state court charges. According to federal prosecutors, Joseph and MacGregor helped the defendant evade detention by allowing him to leave the courthouse through a rear exit while the ICE agent waited in the front lobby. A grand jury investigation began within weeks and on April 25, 2019, Joseph and MacGregor were indicted. Joseph surrendered to authorities and MacGregor was arrested at home. Both pled not guilty and were released without bail. MacGregor retired and Joseph is on administrative leave with pay pending trial. A motion to dismiss filed by Joseph was denied, and as of July 2020, no trial date has been set. On September 22, 2022, the federal prosecutor overseeing the case announced that all charges against Joseph would be dismissed as part of an agreement requiring Joseph to self-refer to the Massachusetts Commission on Judicial Conduct and make certain admissions in connection with that referral.

Federal prosecutions of state judges are extremely rare in the United States. This was the first prosecution of a sitting Massachusetts judge since 1787, when a judge was prosecuted for helping rebels in Shays' Rebellion. The case came amid escalating tensions between the first Trump administration and "sanctuary cities" such as Newton, where local officials openly refused to enforce the administration's immigration policies. Reactions to the prosecution were divided, and the case resulted in legislation and additional lawsuits brought by both supporters and opponents, seeking to loosen or strengthen enforcement of federal immigration laws in local courtrooms.

== Background ==
Massachusetts courts blatantly and willfully disregard ICE's requests to detain aliens on a daily basis, and cannot be relied upon to honor our requests.

— Internal email by an official in ICE's Boston field office

After taking office in 2017, the Republican Trump administration prioritized reducing immigration (legal and illegal), increased deportations, and revoked protections for immigrants who had previously been allowed to remain in the United States. Democrats, immigration advocates, and others resisted these policies, calling them unfair and antithetical to American values. Trump regularly criticized "sanctuary cities" and states that refused to cooperate with federal immigration enforcement. In 2018, Trump publicly urged Attorney General Jeff Sessions to bring charges for obstruction of justice against Oakland, California mayor Libby Schaaf for warning Oakland residents about an impending raid by the ICE. By April 2019, the Trump administration was in a "standoff" with sanctuary cities over local enforcement of immigration policies. That month, Trump suggested busing migrants from the US border to sanctuary cities, which critics called callous and Trump allies called impractical.

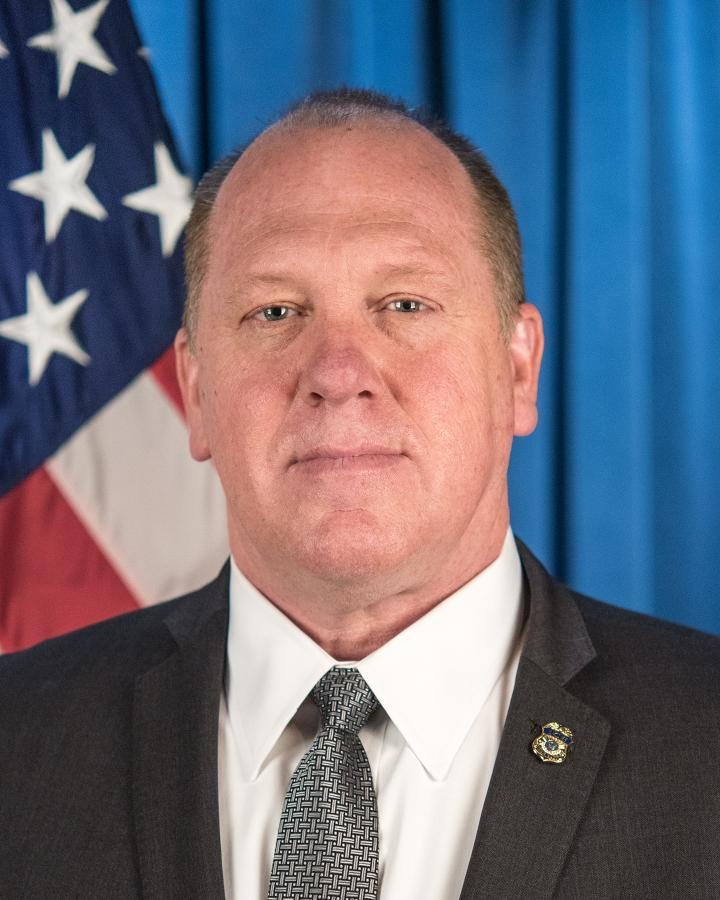
Thomas Homan

Though not the first state where local officials refused to enforce federal immigration laws, Massachusetts had been a leader in the sanctuary city movement. The legal fight over ICE detentions strained the state court system. Massachusetts state courts passed legal rulings limiting the ability of ICE agents to detain immigrants at state courthouses. According to a retired state court judge, federal immigration authorities were "furious" at the Massachusetts Supreme Judicial Court (SJC), the state's highest court, for a 2017 ruling that state courts could not hold people solely because of ICE detainers. (Note: ICE detainers are written requests from the agency to local jail officials or other law enforcement to detain an individual up to 48 hours after their release in order for ICE agents to take the individual into federal custody. Compliance with ICE detainers is not required, unlike federal warrants.) The SJC ruled that state law enforcement officials lacked the authority under state law to detain a person based on an ICE detainer. Massachusetts courts have also issued rules requiring judges and their staff to neither assist nor obstruct federal immigration authorities.

In response to the 2017 SJC ruling, Massachusetts Governor Charlie Baker, a Republican, filed legislation that would have given state officers authority to honor ICE detainer requests for criminal suspects and convicts. Republicans in the Massachusetts House of Representatives have also introduced similar bills and budget amendments. As of April 2019, none have passed. In 2018, ICE's acting director Thomas Homan issued a policy directive allowing agents to enter state courthouses to arrest illegal aliens. Judges, lawyers, and other advocates criticized the Trump administration for increasing courthouse arrests of illegal aliens, arguing it disrupts the criminal justice system, "scaring people away from halls of justice". Schools and places of worship were considered "sensitive locations" – free from immigration enforcement – but the Trump administration had resisted calls to similarly designate courthouses, arguing that courthouses are good places to make arrests because visitors are screened for weapons.

== Alleged incident ==
Newton is a suburb of Boston, Massachusetts.

On March 30, 2018, Jose Medina-Perez, a 38-year-old illegal immigrant from the Dominican Republic, was arrested for narcotics possession in Newton, which had been a sanctuary city since 2017. He was also thought to be the subject of a drunk driving warrant issued in Pennsylvania. After his fingerprints were found to match those of someone deported from the US twice (2003 and 2007) and barred from re-entering the US until 2027, ICE issued a detainer. On April 2, 2018, Medina-Perez was brought to the Newton District Court, described by The New York Times as "a sleepy, two-room courthouse in a wealthy, liberal suburb." According to the indictment, at 9:30 a.m. an ICE officer arrived to observe the hearing and detain Medina-Perez if he were released.

Medina-Perez's hearing began at 2:48 p.m., with Massachusetts state District Court Judge Shelley Richmond Joseph (a former assistant attorney general and criminal defense attorney) presiding. Joseph had the clerk ask the ICE officer to leave the courtroom and wait in the lobby. According to Joseph, this was in keeping with court policy at the time. According to the indictment, the ICE officer was told that Medina-Perez, if released, would leave through the lobby. Joseph held a sidebar conference with the prosecutor and Medina-Perez's defense attorney. Medina-Perez was eligible to be released on bail bond, and during the sidebar conference, Medina-Perez's attorney told Joseph that Medina-Perez had an ICE detainer, and that if he were returned to the Billerica jail and released from there, ICE would apprehend him. Joseph instructed the court clerk to deactivate the audio recorder in the courtroom, allegedly in violation of Massachusetts courtroom rules. The recording remained off for 52 seconds.

According to the indictment, the recorder was reactivated at 2:41 p.m. The prosecutor asked Joseph to dismiss the fugitive warrant because Medina-Perez did not resemble the mugshot of the Pennsylvania fugitive. Joseph granted the request and the fugitive charge was dismissed. The drug possession charge did not require Medina-Perez to be held in custody, and would be the subject of a pre-trial conference held at a later date. Joseph ordered Medina-Perez to be released. Medina-Perez's attorney told Joseph that Medina-Perez had some property "downstairs", and asked for permission to speak with Medina-Perez "downstairs with the interpreter". According to the indictment, Joseph ordered Medina-Perez to exit through the basement lockup facility. MacGregor escorted Medina-Perez, his attorney, and an interpreter to the court's basement lockup facility, where at 3:01 p.m. he used his security access card to open a rear exit to a public parking lot and allow Medina-Perez to leave the courthouse. The ICE officer was not informed and remained in the lobby until the court closed at 4:30 p.m. The New York Times reported that Medina-Perez "climbed over a fence at the back of the courthouse parking lot." He was arrested by police again later the same month, and again faced deportation.

== Pre-trial proceedings ==
News of Medina-Perez's release from custody reached ICE headquarters in Washington, D.C., within hours. ICE's then-director of enforcement and removal operations Matthew Albence informed acting ICE director Thomas Homan later that day. Homan believed it was clearly obstruction of justice, but ICE did not have the legal authority to prosecute; only a US Attorney could seek an indictment. According to The New York Times, "The idea of such a prosecution was popular in Washington." A grand jury was convened within weeks and proceedings continued for a year. MacGregor testified before the grand jury on July 12, 2018. On December 1, 2018, The Boston Globe reported that a grand jury was investigating Joseph for obstruction of justice.

=== Indictment and plea ===
On April 25, 2019, Joseph and MacGregor were indicted for conspiracy to obstruct justice and aiding and abetting obstruction of justice and obstructing an official proceeding; MacGregor was also charged with perjury for allegedly telling the grand jury that he had been unaware of Medina-Perez's ICE detainer. Prosecutors also allege that MacGregor falsely told state judges that he had accidentally disabled the courtroom audio recorder through his unfamiliarity with it. Joseph and MacGregor each face 20 years and could be fined $250,000. They pleaded not guilty, and were released without bail.

=== Suspension and legal fees ===
The Massachusetts Supreme Judicial Court (SJC), the state's highest court, suspended Joseph without pay on the day she was indicted. She asked the SJC to restore her pay and allow her to work on administrative tasks for the courts while the case against her proceeded. Lawyers' and retired judges' groups supported Joseph's request. The SJC held a hearing on June 26, 2019.

On August 13, 2019, in a 43-page, 5–1 decision, the SJC ordered the restoration of Joseph's $181,328 salary, with benefits and $51,000 in backpay retroactive to April 25, 2019. Chief Justice Ralph Gants wrote for the court, "In turbulent times, the risk of being stripped of a paycheck may have a chilling effect on a judge's willingness to challenge the conduct of a prosecutor and thereby diminish the overall independence of the judiciary." The sole dissenting justice, Frank Gaziano, wrote that the court's decision "smacks of preferential treatment, and thereby erodes public confidence in the judiciary". Although Joseph's salary was restored, the SJC unanimously voted against her request to be assigned to administrative duties during her suspension.

Prior to her indictment, the State of Massachusetts paid Joseph's legal fees, amounting to $127,000. A GoFundMe campaign was created to help the judge pay legal fees when she was suspended. Wesley MacGregor also received $2,500 for legal fees from the state.

=== Motion to dismiss ===
In September 2019, Joseph filed a motion to dismiss the charges against her, which she called "unprecedented", asserting that "no state judge has ever been prosecuted for not facilitating the immigration policies of the federal government". A group of 61 retired Massachusetts judges, together with US law professors and others, filed an amicus curiae brief in support of the motion to dismiss, arguing that "Occasionally frustrating the expectations of the executive branch is a core function of an independent judiciary." The brief contended that Joseph wasn't obstructing justice but ensuring it, and that "if Judge Joseph is prosecuted, every Massachusetts judge in every Massachusetts courthouse will feel a constant external pressure to refrain from actions that might antagonize federal officials". The district court denied the motion on July 27, 2020. Joseph appealed the ruling to the United States Court of Appeals for the First Circuit, which heard oral arguments in the case in December 2021. On March 3, 2022, a three judge panel of the circuit court refused to overturn the lower court's denial of Joseph's motion to dismiss, clearing the way for the criminal case against her to proceed.

=== Dismissal of charges ===
On September 22, 2022, the federal prosecutor overseeing the case announced that all charges against Joseph would be dismissed as part of an agreement requiring Joseph to self-refer to the Massachusetts Commission on Judicial Conduct and make certain admissions in connection with that referral. The Commission has the authority to investigate and recommend discipline for judicial misconduct. The prosecutor also announced that a deferred prosecution agreement would resolve the perjury charge against MacGregor, while the obstruction of justice counts against him would be dismissed.

== Impact and reactions ==
Nationwide, federal prosecutions of state judges are exceedingly rare. Joseph's indictment was the first time a sitting judge was indicted for criminal behavior in Massachusetts since 1787, when a judge was found guilty of libel and removed from the bench for defending farmers involved in Shays' Rebellion. The "closely-watched case" drew national attention, and sparked a debate about states refraining from carrying out the "increasingly tough" immigration policies of the Trump administration. An article in USA Today described it as "an unusual escalation in the federal government's strict immigration enforcement policy, and its battles with states and local governments that shelter migrants". Fox News commentator Laura Ingraham described the case as an example of "activist judges undermining Trump's immigration policies".

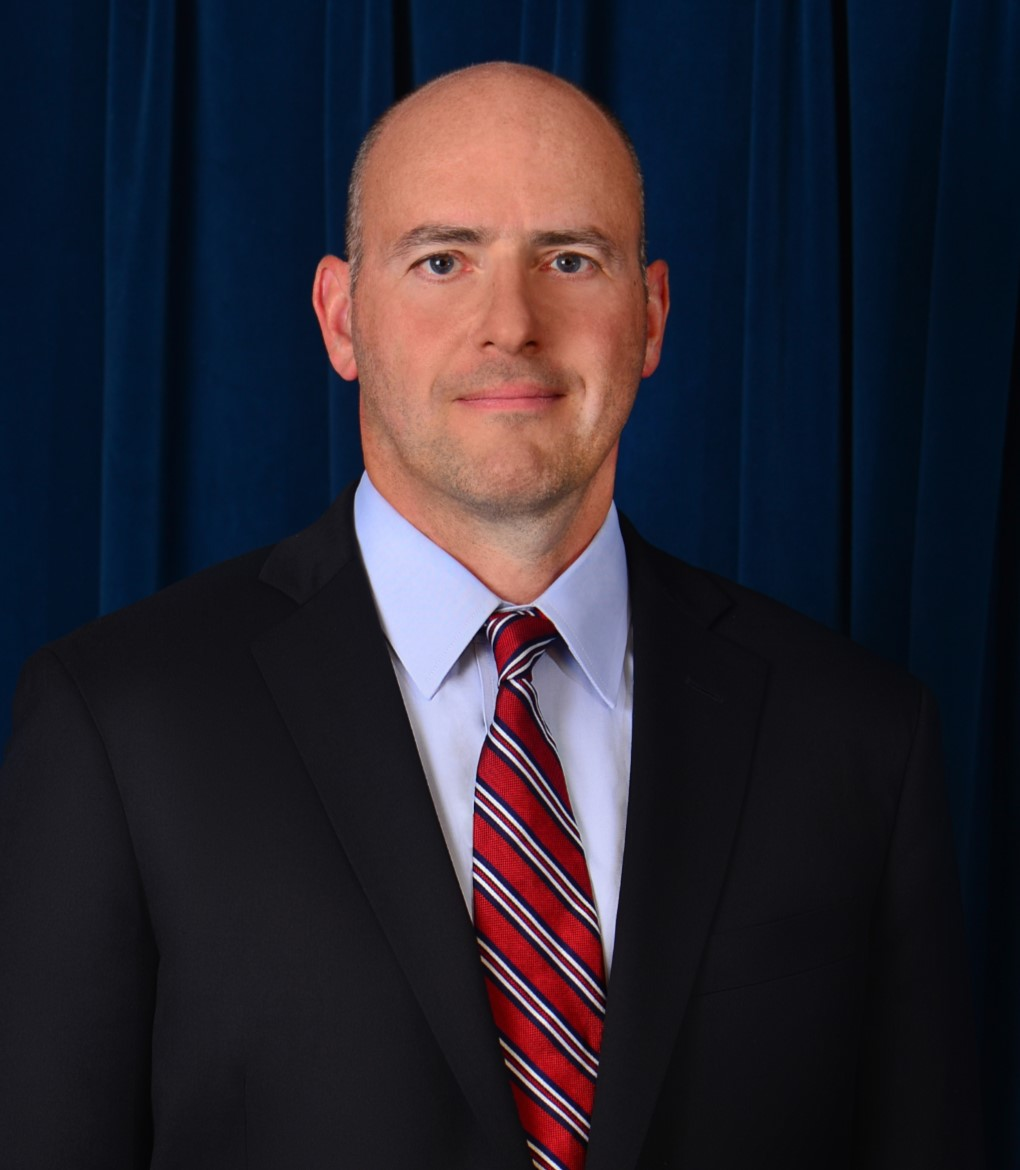
US Attorney Andrew Lelling led the prosecution.

The New York Times reported that some members of Massachusetts's legal and immigration rights community have "kept a distance" from Joseph, "in part because the evidence against her was damning", but that "legal heavyweights have rallied in her defense", arguing that United States Attorney for the District of Massachusetts Andrew Lelling, who oversaw the prosecution, "crossed a line by indicting a state judge, inviting the use of federal power to intimidate state officials into compliance." Boston newspapers have reported regularly on the case. One letter-writer to The Boston Globe compared Joseph with Henry David Thoreau and Martin Luther King Jr. Writing in The Boston Herald, right-wing radio host Howie Carr called Joseph "a lawless, privileged moonbat judge ... hoping for an O. J. Simpson-like jury nullification from 12 Democrats afflicted with Trump Derangement Syndrome."

Supporters of Joseph warned that the federal case will lead to the prosecution of more judges, undermining judicial independence. Massachusetts Attorney General Maura Healey criticized the indictment as "a radical and politically motivated attack on our state and the independence of our courts", and "misuse of prosecutorial resources". Lelling denied that the indictment was meant to send a political message, saying, "We did not bring this case in response to the public debate over immigration enforcement".

The Massachusetts chapter of the American Civil Liberties Union (ACLU) described the case as "preposterous, ironic, and deeply damaging to the rule of law," saying the decision "seems to have little to do with the actual facts, and everything to do with enforcing the president's anti-immigrant agenda". Massachusetts ACLU director Carol Rose called the case "outrageous", saying that Joseph must prioritize ensuring fair access to justice, and that ICE agents posted in courthouses could deter immigrants from going to court or reporting crimes, depriving them of their right to justice. After the indictment, Rose called on the Massachusetts state legislature to pass the Safe Communities Act (H.3724), also known as the "Access to Justice Bill", which would reduce state law enforcement's ability to coordinate with ICE.

During grand jury investigations in December 2018, Massachusetts Governor Charlie Baker called for Joseph to be temporarily removed from office. Baker supported Joseph's suspension following her indictment, issuing a statement saying that "no one should obstruct federal law enforcement officials trying to do their jobs" and noting that his administration "has filed legislation to allow court officials as well as law-enforcement to work with federal immigration officials to detain dangerous individuals."

In April 2019, two Massachusetts district attorneys, Suffolk County District Attorney Rachael Rollins and Middlesex County District Attorney Marian Ryan, filed a lawsuit against ICE to stop its practice of apprehending people at Massachusetts courthouses. The lawsuit said the arrests deter victims and witnesses from seeking relief from and cooperating with the courts. According to the suit, ICE's courthouse arrests violate defendants' constitutional rights and have prevented some immigrants from receiving court-ordered drug and mental health services, and caused others to violate their probation or otherwise default on court orders. On June 20, 2019, U.S. District Judge Indira Talwani of the United States District Court for the District of Massachusetts granted a preliminary injunction in the case temporarily prohibiting ICE agents from making arrests at Massachusetts courthouses. By July 2019, the lawsuit was being pursued by a coalition of district attorneys, public defenders, and other advocates. On May 22, 2021, the lawsuit was dropped after the Biden administration changed ICE policy to no longer make routine arrests at courthouses.

== See also ==
- Hannah Dugan, a judge involved in a similar case
