= 2008 Milwaukee mayoral election =

- April 1, 2008
- Turnout: 25.59%
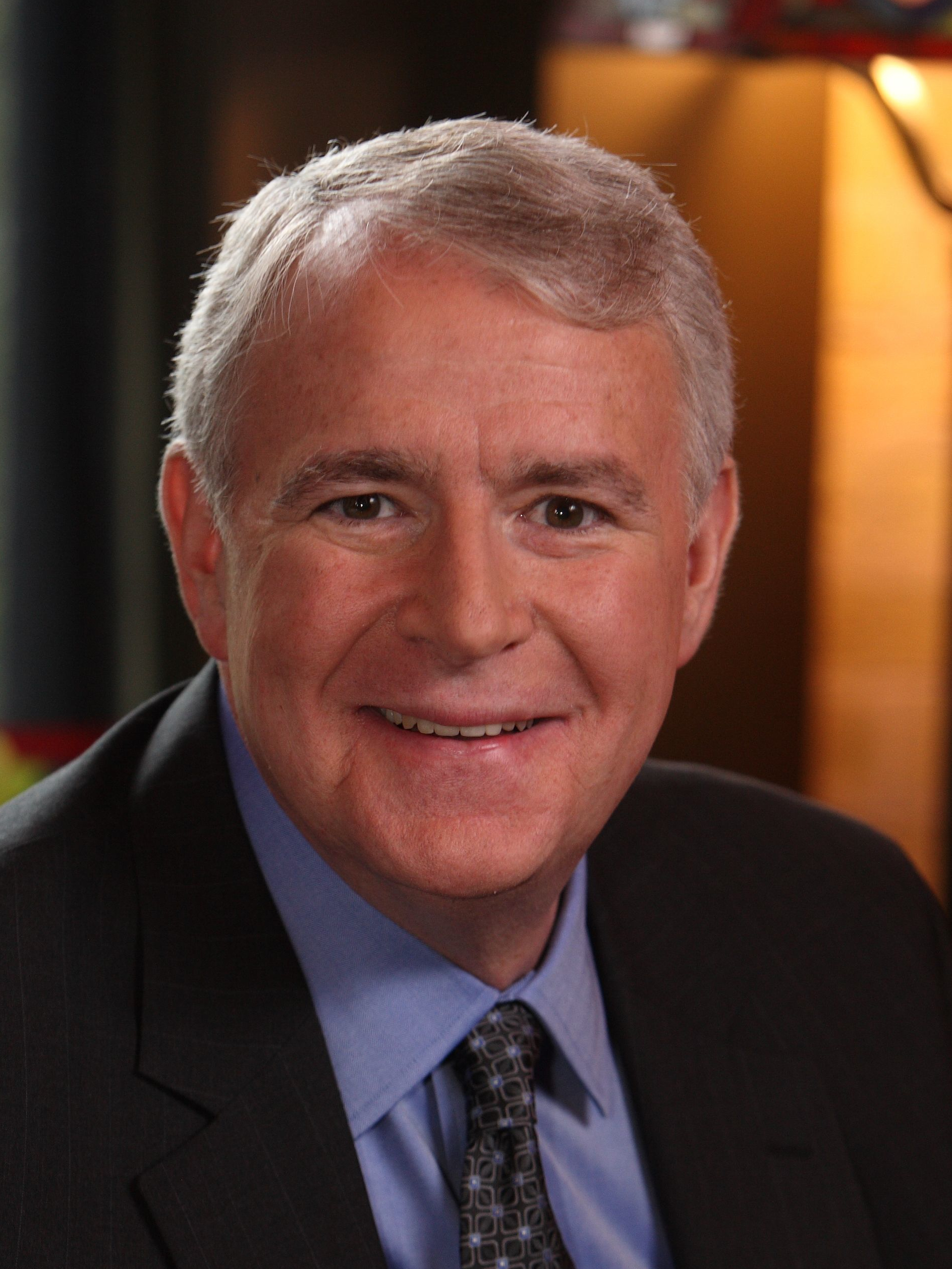

Candidate	Tom Barrett	Andrew J. Shaw
Popular vote	64,473	16,866
Percentage	78.89%	20.64%
Mayor before election
Tom Barrett
Elected mayor
Tom Barrett

The 2008 Milwaukee mayoral election was held on Tuesday, April 1, 2008, to elect the mayor for Milwaukee. Tom Barrett was reelected.

Municipal elections in Wisconsin are non-partisan.

The sole opponent of Barrett was Andrew J. Shaw, a nightclub owner and attorney. Shaw was Asian American, and if elected would have been the first Asian-American mayor of the city.

== Results ==
General election results, April 1, 2008
Candidate	Votes	%
Tom Barrett (incumbent)	64,473	78.89
Andrew J. Shaw	16,866	20.64
Write-In	384	0.47
Total votes	81,723	100
Turnout	81,723	25.59%
