= Cavalier Johnson =

American politician

- Johnson in 2024

45th Mayor of Milwaukee
- Incumbent
- Assumed office December 22, 2021; Acting: December 22, 2021 – April 13, 2022
- Preceded by: Tom Barrett

President of the Milwaukee Common Council
- In office April 21, 2020 – April 13, 2022
- Preceded by: Ashanti Hamilton
- Succeeded by: José Pérez

Member of the Milwaukee Common Council from the 2nd district
- In office April 19, 2016 – April 13, 2022
- Preceded by: Joe Davis
- Succeeded by: Mark Chambers

Personal details
- Born: November 5, 1986 (age 39) Milwaukee, Wisconsin, U.S.
- Party: Democratic
- Spouse: Dominique Johnson (m. 2016)
- Children: 3
- Education: University of Wisconsin, Madison (BA)

Cavalier "Chevy" Johnson (born November 5, 1986) is an American politician who has served as the 45th mayor of Milwaukee, Wisconsin, since 2021. A member of the Democratic Party, he previously served on the Milwaukee Common Council from 2016 to 2022.

Johnson served as president of the Common Council from 2020 to 2022. By virtue of this position, Johnson became acting mayor following the resignation of Tom Barrett as mayor. Johnson is the second African-American mayor in the city's history, after only Marvin Pratt (who had served as acting mayor in 2004). In 2022, Johnson won a special election to finish the remainder of Barrett's unexpired term, becoming the first African-American to be elected mayor of Milwaukee. He was re-elected to a full term in 2024.

== Early life and education ==
Johnson's father worked as a custodian for more than 30 years, and his mother worked as a certified nursing assistant. He is one of 10 siblings. He grew up in Milwaukee's 53206 ZIP code, known for having the highest incarceration rate for African-American males out of any ZIP code in the country.

At 14 years old, he was selected by the YMCA to participate in a pre-college program, Sponsor-A-Scholar, for low-income students in Milwaukee Public Schools. Johnson credits this for his commitment to community service.

In 2005, Johnson graduated from Bay View High School. As a junior, he was a cameraman for the Youth in Government press corps. He continued his education after high school, attending the University of Wisconsin–Madison, where he earned his bachelor's degree in political science in 2009.

Johnson has served on boards at the Milwaukee YMCA, ACLU of Wisconsin, and Milwaukee Community Brainstorming.

== Career ==
After college, Johnson worked with the Milwaukee Area Workforce Investment Board assisting at-risk youth, youth entering the workforce for the first time, and adults retooling to enter the workforce. Johnson worked as a community outreach liaison for the government of Milwaukee, where he interacted with community and faith leaders.

Johnson ran for a seat on the Milwaukee County Board of Supervisors in a five-way special election in 2011. He finished fifth, with 171 votes. In 2012, Johnson ran for a different seat on the County Board, finishing sixth out of seven candidates, with 106 votes.

In 2016, Johnson ran for 2nd District Alderman on the Milwaukee Common Council, winning a five-way primary with 38 percent of the vote and winning the general election with 4,307 votes (52 percent). In 2018, Johnson was the lead sponsor to ban fee-based conversion therapy of minors in Milwaukee.

Johnson was re-elected without opposition in 2020, and he was also elected by his peers, in an 8–7 vote, to serve as the Milwaukee Common Council President.

Johnson became acting mayor of Milwaukee upon the resignation of Tom Barrett—who was set to become Ambassador to Luxembourg—on December 22, 2021. He served as acting mayor until the 2022 Milwaukee mayoral special election, a race in which Johnson was a candidate. The day before assuming the role, Johnson announced that his top priority would be combating reckless driving to create safe streets. On April 5, 2022, Johnson won the special election, becoming the first elected African-American mayor of Milwaukee. While Johnson is the first elected black mayor of Milwaukee, he is the city's second black mayor, after Marvin Pratt, who served as acting mayor in 2004.

== Personal life ==
Johnson lives in Milwaukee's Concordia neighborhood. He is married and has three children.

== Electoral data ==
Milwaukee Mayoral Special Election, 2022
Party	Candidate	Votes	%	±%
Nonpartisan Special Primary, February 15, 2022
Nonpartisan	Cavalier Johnson (incumbent)	25,779	41.79%	
Nonpartisan	Bob Donovan	13,742	22.28%	
Nonpartisan	Lena Taylor	7,877	12.77%	−17.92%
Nonpartisan	Marina Dimitrijevic	7,521	12.19%	
Nonpartisan	Earnell Lucas	5,886	9.53%	
Nonpartisan	Michael Sampson	514	0.83%	
Nonpartisan	Ieshuh Griffin	315	0.51%	
Write-in		56	0.09%	-0.68%
Total votes		61,743	100.00%	-6.94%
Special Election, April 5, 2022
Nonpartisan	Cavalier Johnson (incumbent)	62,143	71.51%	
Nonpartisan	Bob Donovan	24,543	28.24%	
Write-in		215	0.25%	-0.68%
Plurality		37,600	43.27%	+17.24%
Total votes		86,901	100.00%	-5.45%

Political offices
Preceded by Tom Barrett	Mayor of Milwaukee; 2021–present Acting: 2021–2022	Incumbent
