= 2004 Milwaukee mayoral election =

- April 6, 2004
- Turnout: 46.37%
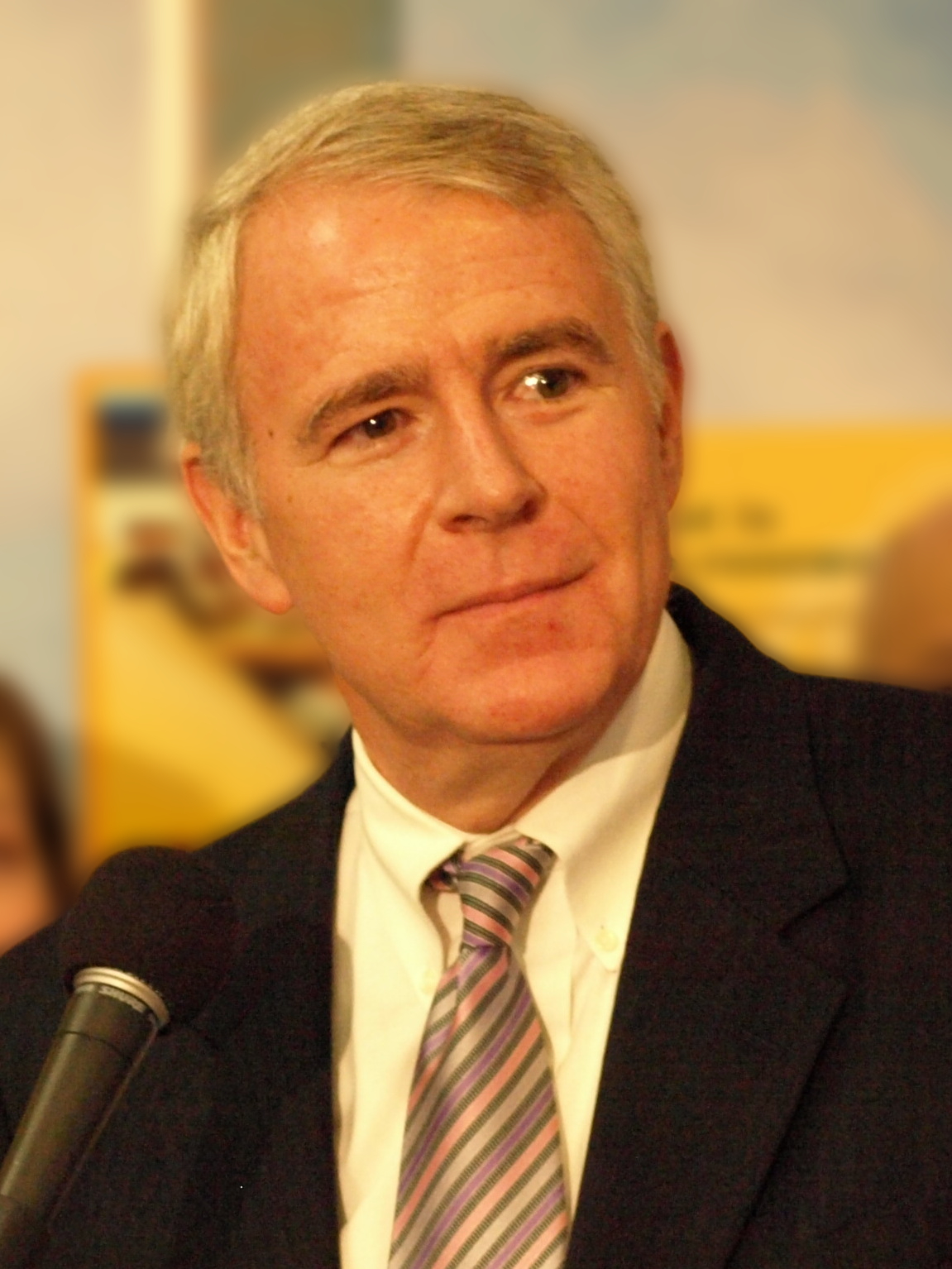

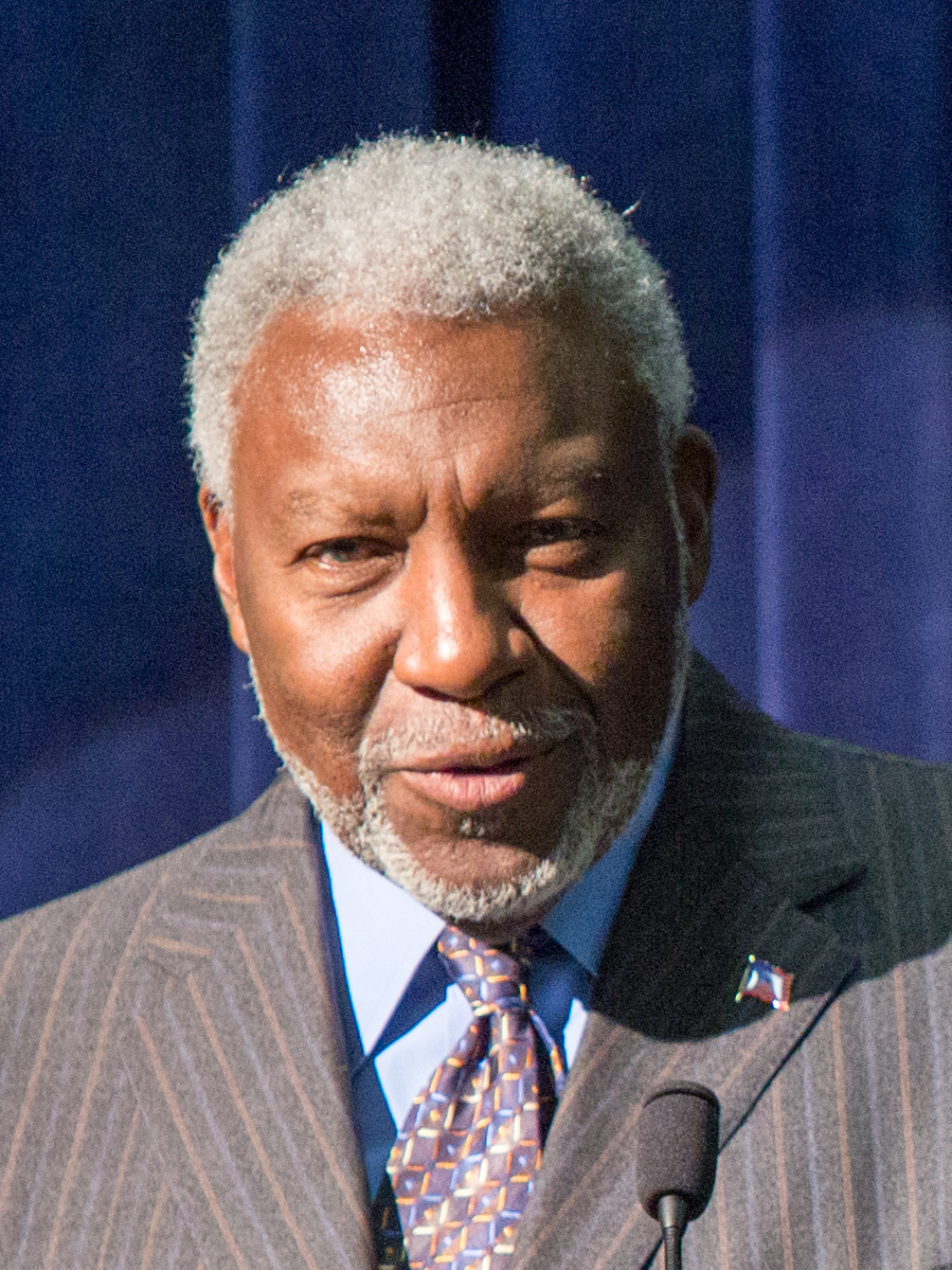
Candidate	Tom Barrett	Marvin Pratt
Popular vote	86,493	74,361
Percentage	53.45%	45.96%
Mayor before election
Marvin Pratt (acting)
Elected mayor
Tom Barrett

The 2004 Milwaukee mayoral election was held on Tuesday, April 6, 2004, to elect the mayor for Milwaukee. Tom Barrett defeated incumbent acting mayor Marvin Pratt. This election coincided with other municipal elections.

Municipal elections in Wisconsin are non-partisan.

== Candidates ==
=== Advanced to general election ===
- Tom Barrett, U.S. congressman
- Marvin Pratt, acting mayor

=== Eliminated in nonpartisan primary election ===
- Vince Bobot, former municipal judge
- David Clarke, sheriff of Milwaukee County
- Frank Cumberbatch, lobbyist
- Sandy Foloran, business owner
- Arthur L. Jones, former Milwaukee police chief
- Thomas G. Nardelli, alderman
- John V. Pitta, teacher
- Leon Todd, former member of the Milwaukee School Board

== Campaign ==
The 2004 election was only the third instance since 1948 that Milwaukee had had a race for mayor in which an elected incumbent was not a candidate (after only 1960 and 1988.

Barrett, whose congressional district covered most of the northern half of the city, was widely viewed as the front-runner. As acting mayor, Pratt was a de-facto incumbent. No incumbent had been unseated for mayor in Milwaukee since 1940.

Clarke was a rising name in conservative politics. He had been first appointed sheriff in 2002 by Republican Governor Scott McCallum, but had won election to a full term later that year as the Democratic nomination.

== Primary election ==
=== Results ===
The first-place finish by Pratt in the primary marked the first instance in Milwaukee history that an African American candidate led the primary for mayor.

Non-partisan primary results, February 17, 2004
Candidate	Votes	%
Marvin Pratt (acting incumbent)	51,653	38.00%
Tom Barrett	44,342	32.62%
David Clarke	23,185	17.06%
Thomas G. Nardelli	4,863	3.58%
Sandy Folaron	4,318	3.18%
Vince Bobot	4,125	3.03%
Arthur L. Jones	1,180	0.87%
Frank Cumberbatch	814	0.60%
John V. Pitta	789	0.58%
Leon Todd	557	0.41%
Write-In	96	0.07%
Total votes	135,922	100
Turnout	135,922	39.65%

== General election ==
=== Results ===
General election results, April 6, 2004
Candidate	Votes	%
Tom Barrett	86,493	53.45%
Marvin Pratt (acting incumbent)	74,361	45.96%
Write-In	957	0.59%
Total votes	161,811	100
Turnout	161,811	46.37%
