= Tom Barrett (Wisconsin politician) =

American diplomat and politician (born 1953)

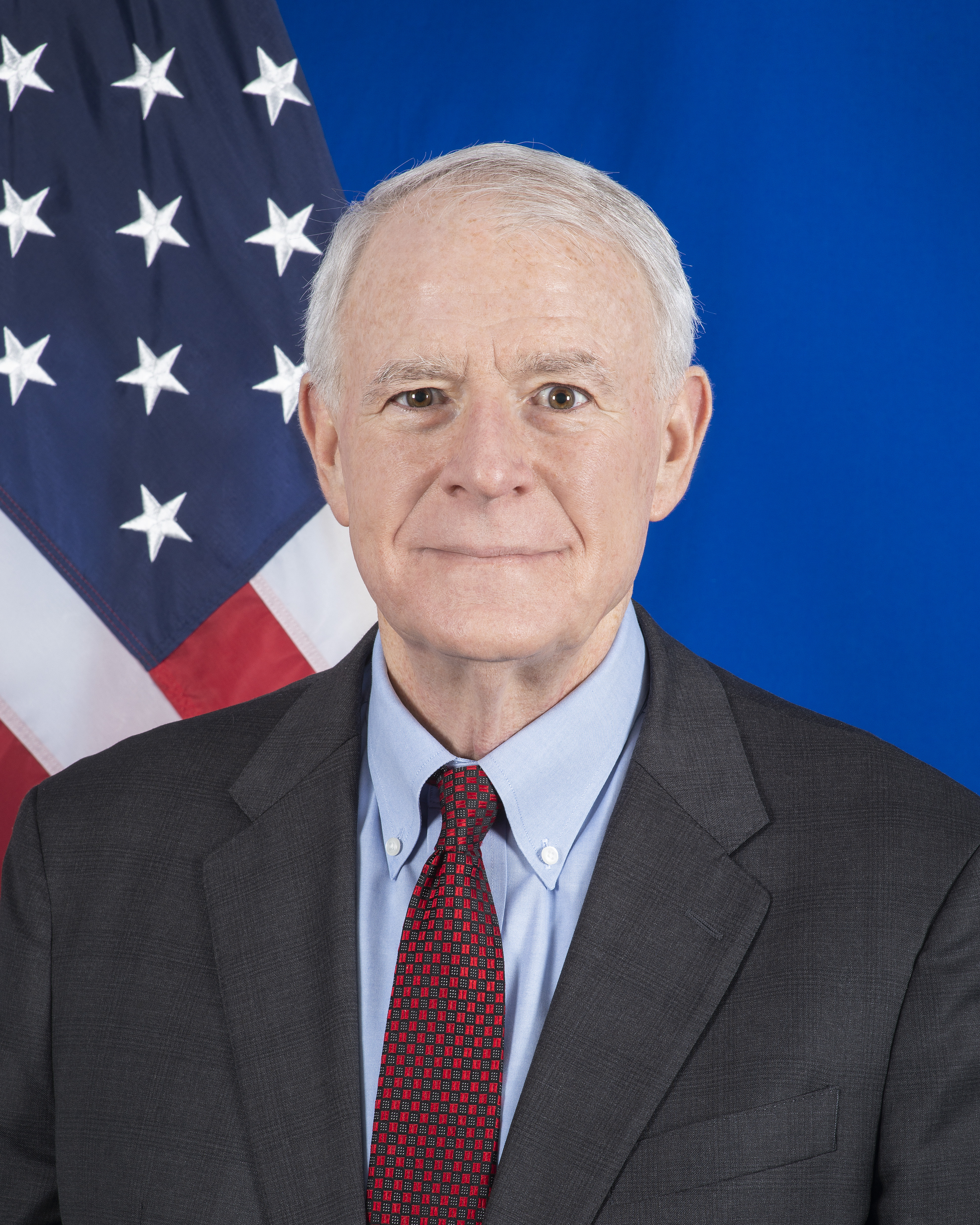
- Official portrait, 2022

United States Ambassador to Luxembourg
- In office February 10, 2022 – January 17, 2025
- President: Joe Biden
- Preceded by: Randy Evans
- Succeeded by: Stacey Feinberg

44th Mayor of Milwaukee
- In office April 19, 2004 – December 22, 2021
- Preceded by: John Norquist; Marvin Pratt (acting)
- Succeeded by: Cavalier Johnson

Member of the U.S. House of Representatives from Wisconsin's 5th district
- In office January 3, 1993 – January 3, 2003
- Preceded by: Jim Moody
- Succeeded by: Jim Sensenbrenner

Member of the Wisconsin Senate from the 5th district
- In office December 13, 1989 – January 3, 1993
- Preceded by: Mordecai Lee
- Succeeded by: Peggy Rosenzweig

Member of the Wisconsin State Assembly
- In office April 5, 1984 – December 13, 1989
- Preceded by: Thomas W. Meaux
- Succeeded by: David Cullen
- Constituency: 9th district (1984–1985); 14th district (1985–1989)

Personal details
- Born: Thomas Mark Barrett; December 8, 1953 (age 72) Milwaukee, Wisconsin, U.S.
- Party: Democratic
- Spouse: Kris Barrett
- Children: 4
- Education: University of Wisconsin, Madison (BA, JD)

Thomas Mark Barrett (born December 8, 1953) is an American diplomat and politician who served as the United States ambassador to Luxembourg from 2022 to 2025. He previously served as the 44th mayor of Milwaukee, Wisconsin from 2004 until 2021.

A member of the Democratic Party, he was previously elected to the Wisconsin State Assembly (1984–1989), Wisconsin Senate (1989–1993) and U.S. House of Representatives (1993–2003). Barrett was elected mayor in April 2004 and won further terms in 2008, 2012, 2016 and 2020. After having unsuccessfully sought the Democratic nomination for governor of Wisconsin in 2002, Barrett was the party's nominee for governor in both 2010 and 2012, losing both elections to Scott Walker. When he left office as mayor, Barrett was the longest-serving current mayor of one of the 50 largest cities in the United States.

== Early life, education and early career ==
Barrett is the oldest son of Gertrude Virginia (of German and English descent) and Thomas J. Barrett (of Irish descent). His father was a World War II veteran who was awarded the Distinguished Flying Cross in 1944 for 30 missions over Germany as a navigator. His mother was a war widow when she met his father at the University of Wisconsin-Madison. They married and moved to Milwaukee, where Barrett was born. He grew up on the city's west side.

Barrett graduated from Marquette University High School; he went on to earn his Bachelor of Arts in economics from the University of Wisconsin–Madison in 1976 and his Juris Doctor from the University of Wisconsin Law School in 1980. He helped put himself through college and law school by working on the Harley-Davidson assembly line. After law school, Barrett served as a law clerk for Judge Robert W. Warren on the United States District Court for the Eastern District of Wisconsin from 1980 to 1982. He later entered into private practice and served as a bank examiner for the Federal Deposit Insurance Corporation.

=== State Assembly and Senate ===
Barrett made his first run for office at the age of 28 for the Wisconsin State Assembly in 1982, but was unsuccessful. He ran again in 1984, this time successfully; he served two terms before making a successful run for the Wisconsin Senate in a December 1989 special election. He continued to serve in the Wisconsin Senate until moving to higher office in 1993.

== U.S. House of Representatives ==
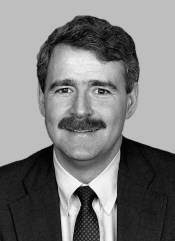
Barrett (age 43; 1997).

In 1992, after U.S. Representative Jim Moody announced his intention to run for the United States Senate, Barrett successfully ran to succeed him. Barrett was reelected four more times to represent Wisconsin's 5th congressional district, which at the time included the northern half of the City of Milwaukee and some adjoining suburban municipalities. While in Congress, Barrett served on the Committee on Energy and Commerce, as well as the Government Reform Committee, Financial Services Committee, Ways and Means Committee and the House Administration Committee.

As a U.S. Representative, Barrett worked with his colleagues to secure aid for flood remediation projects in his district. He also worked to modernize the Community Reinvestment Act and frequently voiced his support of Milwaukee's Midwest Express Airlines. Barrett sponsored 37 bills and co-sponsored 1345 bills between January 5, 1993, and October 10, 2002. He was a delegate to the 2000 Democratic National Convention from Wisconsin.

== Mayor of Milwaukee ==
=== Elections ===
In 2004, Barrett ran successfully for mayor of Milwaukee, defeating incumbent Acting Mayor Marvin Pratt, who took office following the resignation of John Norquist. Barrett was reelected in 2008 with 79% of the vote, the largest percentage a mayoral candidate had received in 40 years. In 2012 he was subsequently reelected against challenger Edward McDonald with over 70% of the vote. In 2016, Barrett was reelected with 70% of the vote over conservative 8th district alderman Robert Donovan. In 2020, Barrett was reelected to a fifth term with over 62% of the vote against Lena Taylor.

=== Development ===
During Barrett's tenure, the city has seen billions of dollars' worth of new downtown developments. Barrett made great use of subsidies and tax incremental financing for developments. Barrett focused heavily on downtown development. In the later period of his mayoralty, the city saw its largest construction boom since the 1960s. The city's downtown experienced a major construction boom that included several new skyscrapers, such as the Northwestern Mutual Tower and Commons.

In 2018, Barrett announced a plan to construct 10,000 units of affordable housing in the city. The plan included an expansion of the use of tax-incremental financing districts.

Barrett made an effort to revive struggling areas of the city by encouraging businesses to relocate to areas near lower-income neighborhoods.

=== Economic matters ===
On February 25, 2009, Barrett gave his State of the City Address. Where he praised the city's past achievements and outlined his plan to increase green jobs, economic development and workforce training in the coming year. Barrett called on the citizens of Milwaukee to remain optimistic during the international economic downturn; "I am fully confident that Milwaukee will withstand the current economic downturn," Barrett said. "We will make smart investments, continue to build strong partnerships, provide training to our workforce and improve our public schools. We will emerge as a stronger and more competitive city." Barrett met with Vice President of the United States Joe Biden and testified before the United States House Transportation Subcommittee on Water Resources and Environment when he traveled to Washington, D.C., on March 18, 2009. Barrett attended a White House Recovery and Reinvestment Act Implementation Conference hosted by Biden. The conference addressed questions from state, county, and local government officials on how to effectively oversee the spending of Recovery Act funds.

=== Environment ===
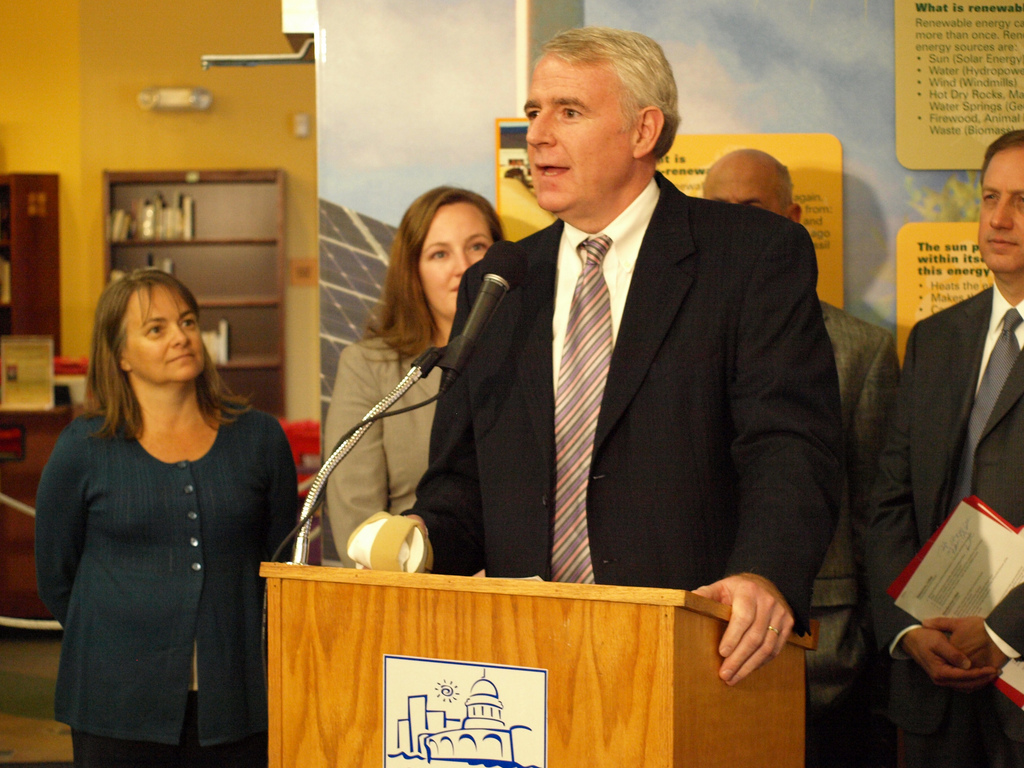
Barrett in 2009

In 2005 Barrett convened a Green Team drawn from city government, business and local universities. On its recommendation he established an Office of Sustainability in 2006. Barrett served as chair of the Great Lakes and St. Lawrence Cities Initiative, a group of American and Canadian local officials concerned with the Great Lakes and the St. Lawrence River.

=== Response to the COVID-19 pandemic ===
During the COVID-19 pandemic in the United States, Barrett took a number of actions. On March 23, 2020, citing concerns of the ongoing coronavirus pandemic, Mayor Barrett sent a letter to Governor Tony Evers, State Senate Majority Leader Scott L. Fitzgerald and Speaker of the State House Robin Vos, requesting that the April 7 elections (including the mayoral election, as well as Wisconsin's presidential primaries and others races) be conducted using mail-in ballots only. Barrett lent his backing to a proposal authored by the Department of City Development under which business improvement districts would be allowed to spend money on assisting companies and property owners hurt by the pandemic without needing Common Council approval. Barrett lobbied the United States Army Corps of Engineers to establish a care facility at the Wisconsin State Fair Park.

=== Other matters ===
In April 2009, Wisconsin Governor Jim Doyle and Mayor Tom Barrett, joined by Superintendent of Public Instruction of Wisconsin Elizabeth Burmaster, announced a broad effort improve the Milwaukee Public Schools (MPS). The announcement followed the completion of a comprehensive independent review of the finances and non-instructional operations of MPS commissioned by the governor and mayor in October 2008.

In 2013, he was one of nine mayors who established July 15 as Social Media Giving Day, encouraging citizens to support charities via social media.

Barrett was an advocate for the construction of The Hop streetcar system.

Mayor Barrett was involved in Milwaukee's successful bid to host the 2020 Democratic National Convention. Before he left the mayor's office, Barrett started the city's bid for the 2024 Republican National Convention. Milwaukee's bid was successful.

== U.S. Ambassador to Luxembourg ==
On August 25, 2021, President Joe Biden announced his intent to nominate Barrett to serve as the United States Ambassador to Luxembourg. Hearings on his nomination were held before the Senate Foreign Relations Committee on November 2, 2021. The committee favorably reported the nomination on December 15, 2021. The United States Senate confirmed him on December 16, 2021, by voice vote. He was sworn in by Judge Lynn Adelman in Milwaukee on December 23, 2021, and arrived in Luxembourg on January 28, 2022. On February 10, 2022, he presented his credentials to the Grand Duke of Luxembourg at the Grand Ducal Palace in Luxembourg City.

== Gubernatorial bids ==
=== 2002 ===
Barrett decided to run for governor in 2002 when he decided to leave Washington D.C. after nearly a decade of service in the U.S. House of Representatives. He did so as a means spend more time in Milwaukee and Wisconsin with his family. Additionally, Wisconsin had lost a seat after the 2000 Census, and the new map resulted in Barrett's district being merged with the 4th district on the other side of Milwaukee, represented by fellow Democrat Jerry Kleczka. While the merged district retained Kleczka's district number, it was geographically and demographically more Barrett's district. However, Barrett announced his candidacy for governor in 2001, effectively handing the merged 4th to Kleczka.

In a heated Democratic primary, Barrett came in a close second to then-Attorney General Jim Doyle, who went on to win the general election.

=== 2010 ===
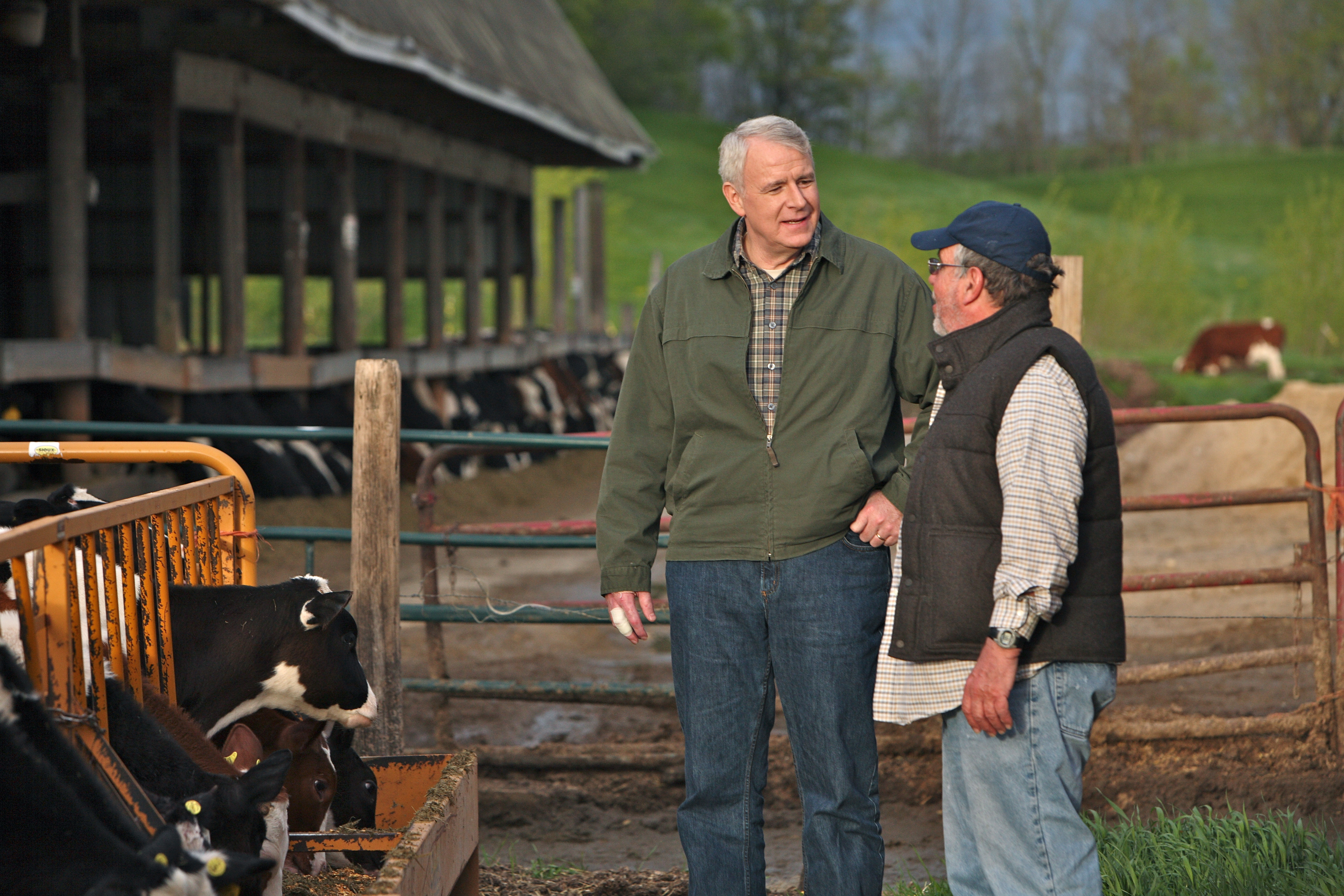
Barrett speaks with a Wisconsin dairy farmer

In August 2009, Doyle announced his decision to not seek reelection to a third term in 2010, leading many to believe Barrett would run for governor. On August 25, a group named "Wisconsin for Tom Barrett" formed, encouraging Barrett to run. On October 26, a website, TomForGovernor.com, was launched after Barbara Lawton, the Lieutenant Governor, backed out. A story in Politico reported that President Barack Obama's political director Patrick Gaspard met with Barrett on November 4, 2009, amid speculation that the White House wanted him to run for Governor of Wisconsin.

Barrett ended months of speculation by officially announcing on November 15, 2009, that he would enter the race for governor. Barrett's campaign raised more than $750,000 in its first seven weeks. In an e-mail thanking supporters, Barrett said his campaign had more than $1.5 million in the bank, a significant start given that he did not declare candidacy for the Democratic primary until November 15, 2009. Barrett ultimately lost the election to Scott Walker.

2010 election for Governor of Wisconsin
Party	Candidate	Votes	%
Republican	Scott Walker	1,128,941	52.3
Democratic	Tom Barrett	1,004,303	46.5

=== 2012 recall election ===
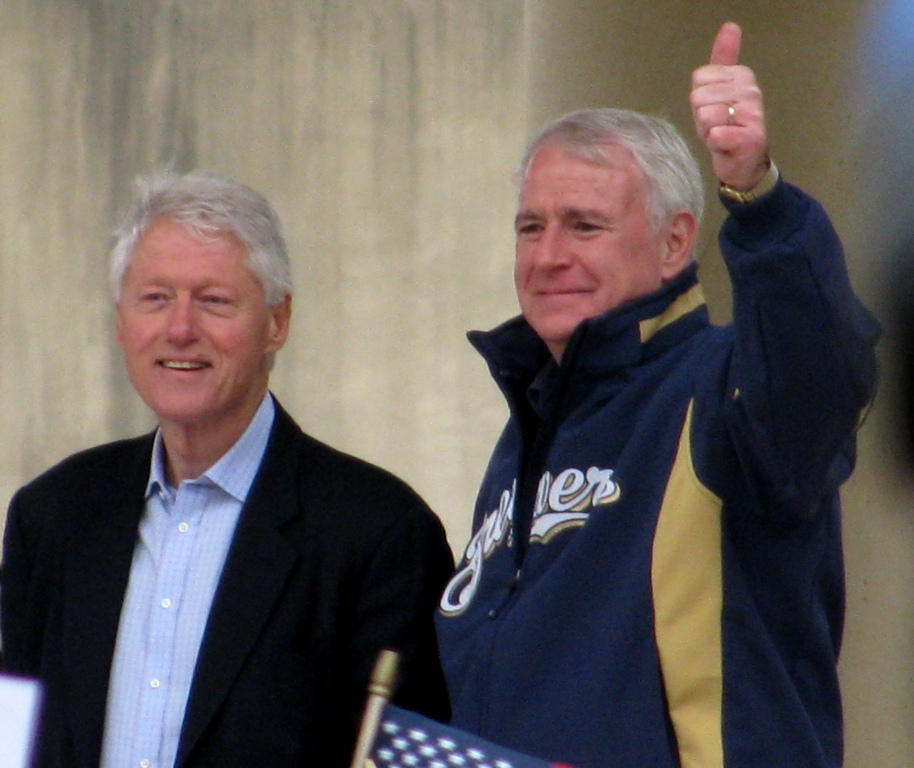
Barrett campaigns alongside former president Bill Clinton in May 2012

After the contentious collective bargaining dispute, Walker's disapproval ratings varied between 50 and 51%, while his approval ratings varied between 47 and 49% in 2011. In a survey of 768 Wisconsin voters conducted between February 24–27, 2011, during the 2011 Wisconsin budget protests, a poll by Public Policy Polling found that 52% of respondents said they would vote for Barrett if the election had been held then, while 45% said they would vote for Walker.

Barrett ended months of speculation by officially announcing on March 30, 2012, that he would enter the race for governor. The American Federation of State, County and Municipal Employees and the Wisconsin Education Association Council, which already supported another Democrat who had announced, had met with Barrett in late December 2011 and tried unsuccessfully to keep him from entering the race. On May 8, Barrett won the Democratic primary for the recall election.

A Marquette Law School Poll released on May 30 (mirroring other polling outlets) had Barrett trailing Walker 52% to 45% among likely voters. The results represent a six-point increase for Walker over Barrett since Marquette's earlier poll in late April. The poll's margin of error for likely voters was plus or minus 4.1 percentage points. Odysseas, a contributor to the progressive blog Daily Kos, had questioned if the Marquette University Law school poll oversampled "right wingers." For example, a poll by Public Policy Polling conducted May 11–13 gave Republicans a 7% edge over Democrats in terms of likely voters, unlikely given Wisconsin voter registration patterns. However, in retrospect the Marquette poll accurately reflected the Wisconsin electorate's vote. However, the same poll showed President Obama holding a lead over Mitt Romney 51–43. On May 21, the Milwaukee Journal-Sentinel endorsed Scott Walker over Barrett arguing "[there is] no reason to remove Walker from office." The Journal-Sentinel had previously endorsed Walker over Barrett in 2010. Walker defeated Barrett in the June 5 recall election by garnering 53.2%-46.3%, a similar margin to the 2010 election. Walker thus became the first governor in US history to survive a recall election.

2012 recall election for Governor of Wisconsin
Party	Candidate	Votes	%	±%
Republican	Scott Walker (incumbent)	1,335,585	53.08%	−0.79%
Democratic	Tom Barrett	1,164,480	46.28%	−0.24%
Independent	Hariprasad Trivedi	14,463	0.57%	N/A
n/a	Write-ins	1,537	0.06%	+0.06%
Total votes		2,516,065	100.0%	N/A
Republican hold				

== Personal life ==
Barrett and his wife still live in Milwaukee's Washington Heights neighborhood, blocks away from his childhood home, where they raised their four, now adult, children Tommy, Annie, Erin and Kate, who all attended Milwaukee German Immersion School.

=== 2009 Wisconsin State Fair attack ===
Barrett was the subject of national news headlines when he was attacked outside the Wisconsin State Fair on August 15, 2009, by a man wielding a pipe. Barrett and some family members were leaving the fair when he responded to a woman's cries for help. They encountered a man and a woman in a heated confrontation. While the mayor called the police, the man, 20-year-old Anthony J. Peters, attacked him with a pipe. Barrett was hospitalized after the incident and again later for reconstructive surgery for his hand. Governor Jim Doyle visited Barrett in the hospital the next morning and said he "found him to be in good spirits and looking good considering what happened... The mayor's heroic actions clearly saved a woman and others from harm", Doyle said in a statement. Peters was arrested the next day. Both President Barack Obama and Vice President Joe Biden telephoned Barrett in the hospital to inquire as to his condition; Obama told Barrett that he went above the call of duty and said he was proud of Barrett's actions. Barrett's injuries included broken teeth, a permanently damaged hand, as well as blows to the head where he was struck with the pipe. Peters pleaded guilty and was sentenced to 12 years in prison and a further 10 years of supervision.

== Electoral history ==
=== U.S. House of Representatives ===
U.S. House, 5th District of Wisconsin (General Election)
Year	Winning candidate	Party	Pct	Opponent	Party	Pct
1992	Tom Barrett	Democratic	57%	Donalda Ann Hammersmith	Republican	43%
1994	Tom Barrett (inc.)	Democratic	58%	Stephen Hollingshead	Republican	42%
1996	Tom Barrett (inc.)	Democratic	67%	Paul D. Melotik	Republican	33%
1998	Tom Barrett (inc.)	Democratic	73%	Jack Melvin	Republican	27%
2000	Tom Barrett (inc.)	Democratic	72%	Johnathan Smith	Republican	28%

=== Mayor of Milwaukee ===
Milwaukee Mayoral Election (General Election)
Year	Winning candidate	Party	Pct	Opponent	Party	Pct
2004	Tom Barrett	Democratic	54%	Marvin Pratt	Democratic	46%
2008	Tom Barrett (inc.)	Democratic	79%	Andrew Shaw	Independent	20%
2012	Tom Barrett (inc.)	Democratic	70%	Edward C. McDonald	Independent	29%
2016	Tom Barrett (inc.)	Democratic	70%	Robert Donovan	Republican	30%
2020	Tom Barrett (inc.)	Democratic	63%	Lena Taylor	Democratic	37%

=== Gubernatorial bids ===
2002 Wisconsin gubernatorial election (Democratic primary)
Winning candidate	Party	Pct	Opponent	Party	Pct	Opponent	Party	Pct
Jim Doyle	Democratic	38%	Tom Barrett	Democratic	34%	Kathleen Falk	Democratic	27%

2010 Wisconsin gubernatorial election (Democratic primary)
Winning candidate	Party	Pct	Opponent	Party	Pct
Tom Barrett	Democratic	91%	Tim John	Democratic	10%

2010 Wisconsin gubernatorial election (general election)
Winning candidate	Party	Pct	Opponent	Party	Pct
Scott Walker	Republican	52%	Tom Barrett	Democratic	47%

2012 Wisconsin gubernatorial recall election (Democratic primary)
Winning candidate	Party	Pct	Opponent	Party	Pct
Tom Barrett	Democratic	58%	Kathleen Falk	Democratic	34%

2012 Wisconsin gubernatorial recall election (general election)
Winning candidate	Party	Pct	Opponent	Party	Pct
Scott Walker (inc.)	Republican	53%	Tom Barrett	Democratic	46%

== See also ==
- List of mayors of the 50 largest cities in the United States
- Zapple doctrine − role in 2012 campaign

U.S. House of Representatives
Preceded by Jim Moody	Member of the U.S. House of Representatives from Wisconsin's 5th congressional district 1993–2003	Succeeded by Jim Sensenbrenner
Political offices
Preceded by Marvin Pratt; Acting	Mayor of Milwaukee; 2004–2021	Succeeded by Chevy Johnson
Party political offices
Preceded by Jim Doyle	Democratic nominee for Governor of Wisconsin; 2010, 2012	Succeeded by Mary Burke
Diplomatic posts
Preceded by Randy Evans	United States Ambassador to Luxembourg; 2022–2025	Succeeded by Stacey Feinberg
U.S. order of precedence (ceremonial)
Preceded by Bill Flores as Former U.S. Representative	Order of precedence of the United States	Succeeded by Richard H. Lehman as Former U.S. Representative
