= 2022 United States Senate election in Wisconsin =

- November 8, 2022
- Turnout: 56.7% ▼
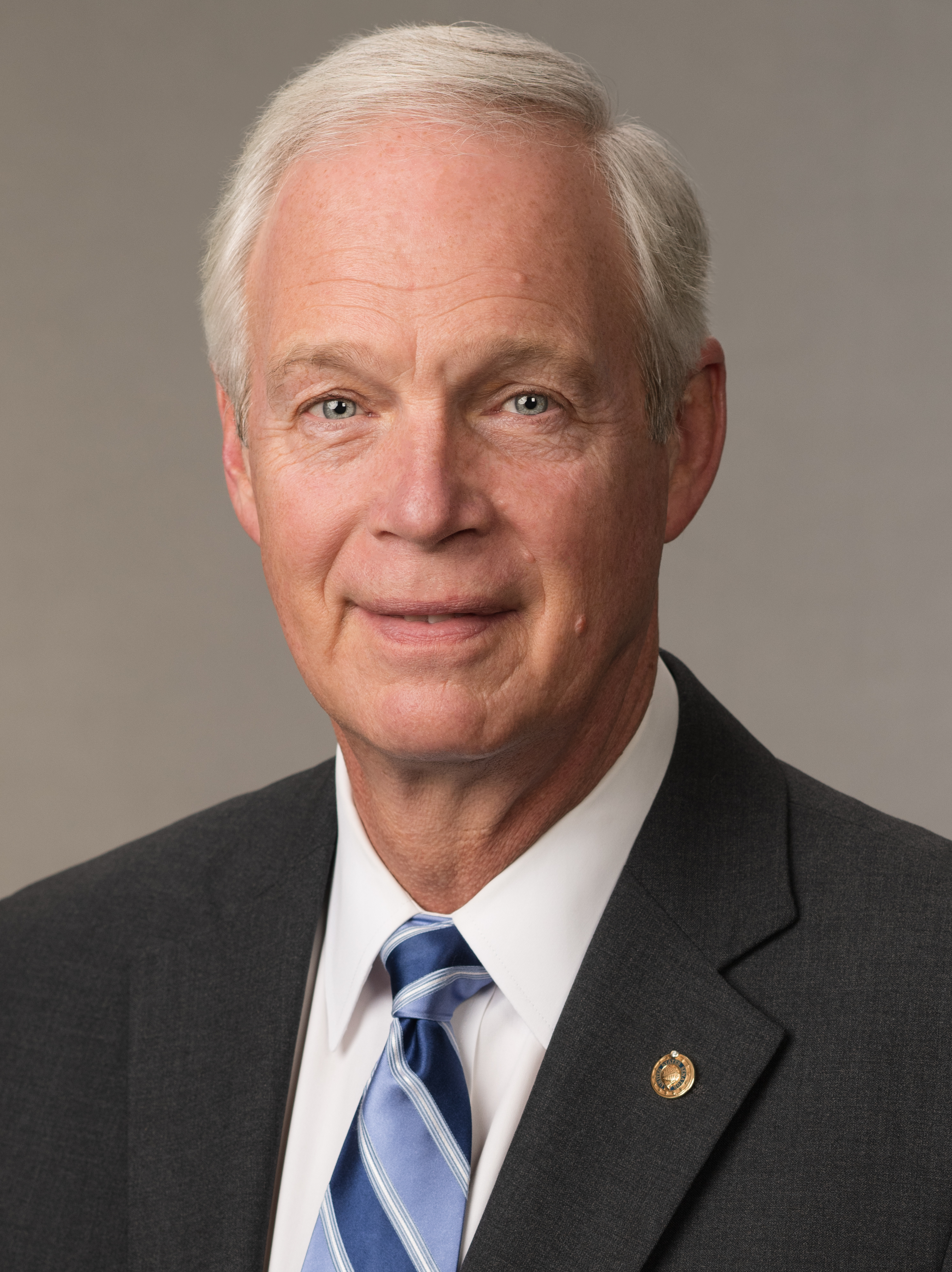

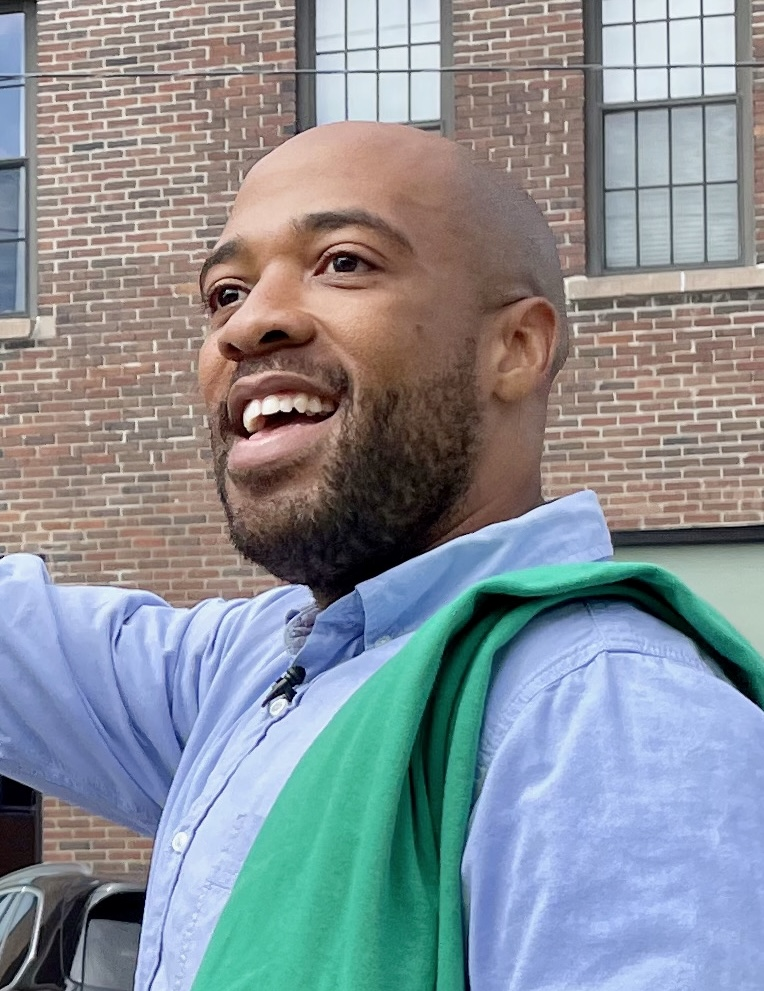
Nominee	Ron Johnson	Mandela Barnes
Party	Republican	Democratic
Popular vote	1,337,185	1,310,467
Percentage	50.41%	49.41%
- Johnson: 40–50% 50–60% 60–70% 70–80% 80–90% >90% Barnes: 40–50% 50–60% 60–70% 70–80% 80–90% >90% Tie: 40–50% 50% No data
U.S. senator before election
Ron Johnson
Republican
Elected U.S. Senator
Ron Johnson
Republican

The 2022 United States Senate election in Wisconsin was held on November 8, 2022, to elect a member of the United States Senate from Wisconsin. The party primaries were held on August 9, 2022. Incumbent Republican Senator Ron Johnson won election to a third term, defeating Democratic Lieutenant Governor Mandela Barnes by 26,718 votes—a one-point margin of victory. In this election, Johnson won five counties he lost in 2016, while his overall victory margin decreased from both 2010 and 2016.

In 2016, Johnson had pledged to serve only two terms in the Senate. He reversed this decision in 2022. The race was one of the most competitive of the cycle, and it followed considerable Democratic success in recent statewide elections. In 2018, Democrats won every statewide contest on the ballot, including the election for the state's other Senate seat. This was one of the two Republican-held Senate seats up for election in a state that Joe Biden won in the 2020 presidential election.

Barnes led in most polls during the summer of 2022. In the final weeks prior to the election, Johnson took a lead of more than three points in the polling average. Though Johnson ultimately prevailed, this election was the closest of his three Senate victories. This was the first Senate election in Wisconsin since 1998 in which the winning candidate was of a different party than the winner of the concurrent gubernatorial election.

== Republican primary ==
=== Candidates ===
==== Nominee ====
- Ron Johnson, incumbent U.S. senator

==== Eliminated in primary ====
- David Schroeder, former educator

==== Disqualified ====
- Brad Beyer, U.S. Army veteran
- Keith Neubert, paramedic

==== Withdrawn ====
- John Berman, electronic hardware designer, test engineer, and candidate for U.S. Senate (Minnesota and Kansas) in 2020

==== Declined ====
- David Beth, Kenosha County sheriff
- Sean Duffy, former U.S. representative from Wisconsin's 7th congressional district
- Mike Gallagher, U.S. representative from Wisconsin's 8th congressional district (ran for re-election; endorsed Johnson)
- Eric Hovde, candidate for U.S. Senate in 2012
- Rebecca Kleefisch, former lieutenant governor of Wisconsin (ran for governor; endorsed Johnson)
- Kevin Nicholson, businessman, former member of the Wisconsin Board of Veterans Affairs, and candidate for U.S. Senate in 2018 (ran for governor)
- Bryan Steil, U.S. representative from Wisconsin's 1st congressional district (ran for re-election; endorsed Johnson)
- Scott Walker, former governor of Wisconsin

=== Endorsements ===
Ron Johnson

U.S. executive branch officials

- John Bolton, U.S. national security advisor (2018–2019), United States Ambassador to the United Nations (2005–2006)
- Nikki Haley, former U.S. ambassador to the United Nations (2017–2018)
- Donald Trump, 45th president of the United States (2017–2021)

Organizations

- Americans for Prosperity Action
- National Federation of Independent Business
- National Republican Senatorial Committee
- Republican Jewish Coalition PAC
- Republican Party of Wisconsin
- Tea Party Express

=== Results ===
Results by county Johnson: 70–80%; 80–90%

Republican primary results
Party	Candidate	Votes	%
Republican	Ron Johnson (incumbent)	563,871	83.7
Republican	David Schroeder	109,917	16.3
Total votes		673,788	100.0

== Democratic primary ==
=== Candidates ===
==== Nominee ====
- Mandela Barnes, lieutenant governor of Wisconsin

==== Eliminated in primary ====
- Kou Lee, restaurant owner
- Adam Murphy, business owner
- Steven Olikara, founder and CEO of Millennial Action Project
- Peter Peckarsky, attorney and candidate for chair of the Democratic National Committee in 2017
- Darrell Williams, Wisconsin Emergency Management administrator

==== Did not file ====
- Chantia Lewis, Milwaukee Common Councillor

==== Withdrew ====
- Gillian Battino, radiologist (ran for state treasurer)
- Sarah Godlewski, state treasurer of Wisconsin (endorsed Barnes; remained on ballot)
- Chris Larson, state senator from the 7th district (endorsed Barnes)
- Alex Lasry, senior vice president of the Milwaukee Bucks and former intern in the Obama administration (endorsed Barnes; remained on ballot)
- Tom Nelson, Outagamie County executive, former majority leader of the Wisconsin Assembly, and nominee for lieutenant governor of Wisconsin in 2010 and for Wisconsin's 8th congressional district in 2016 (endorsed Barnes; remained on ballot)
- Jeff Rumbaugh, disability rights activist and candidate for governor in 2018 (endorsed Nelson)

==== Declined ====
- Tony Evers, governor of Wisconsin (ran for re-election)
- Josh Kaul, attorney general of Wisconsin (ran for re-election)
- Ron Kind, U.S. representative from Wisconsin's 3rd congressional district
- Mark Pocan, U.S. representative from Wisconsin's 2nd congressional district (ran for re-election)

=== Fundraising ===
Candidate	Unitemized (<$200) individual contributions	Itemized (>$200) individual contributions	Self funding	Coverage ending
Mandela Barnes	$2,668,973.10	$3,305,480.72	$0.00	Coverage ending: 06/30/2022

=== Endorsements ===
Mandela Barnes

U.S. senators

- Tammy Baldwin, U.S. senator from Wisconsin (2013–present)
- Cory Booker, U.S. senator from New Jersey (2013–present)
- Alex Padilla, U.S. senator from California (2021–present)
- Bernie Sanders, U.S. senator from Vermont (2007–present)
- Elizabeth Warren, U.S. senator from Massachusetts (2013–present)

U.S. representatives

- Jim Clyburn, U.S. representative from SC-06 (1993–present), House majority whip (2019–2023, 2007–2011), House assistant Democratic leader (2011–2019), chair of the Congressional Black Caucus (1999–2001)
- Ruben Gallego, U.S. representative from Arizona's 7th congressional district (2015–2025)
- Ron Kind, U.S. representative from WI-03 (1997–2023)
- Gwen Moore, U.S. representative from WI-04 (2005–present)
- Alexandria Ocasio-Cortez, U.S. representative from NY-14 (2019–present)
- Mark Pocan, U.S. representative from WI-02 (2013–present)
- Katie Porter, U.S. representative from CA-45 (2019–2025)

State officials

- Tony Evers, governor of Wisconsin (2019–present) (previously declined to endorse)
- John Fetterman, 34th lieutenant governor of Pennsylvania (2019–2023)
- Sarah Godlewski, 36th treasurer of Wisconsin (2019–2023) and candidate for U.S. Senate in 2022

State legislators

- Jimmy P. Anderson, state representative from the 47th district (2017–2025)
- Jonathan Brostoff, state representative from the 19th district (2015–2023) (previously endorsed Chris Larson)
- Marisabel Cabrera, state representative from the 9th district (2019–2024)
- Tim Carpenter, state senator from the 3rd district (2003–present)
- Steve Doyle, state representative from the 94th district (2011–present)
- Gary Hebl, state representative from the 46th district
- Francesca Hong, state representative from the 76th district (2021–present)
- La Tonya Johnson, state senator from the 6th district (2017–present)
- Fred Kessler, former state representative from the 12th district (2005–2019)
- Chris Larson, state senator from the 7th district (2011–present)
- Tom Nelson, Outagamie County executive, former majority leader of the Wisconsin Assembly, nominee for lieutenant governor of Wisconsin in 2010, for Wisconsin's 8th congressional district in 2016 and candidate for U.S. Senate in 2022
- Tod Ohnstad, state representative from the 65th district (2013–2025)
- Supreme Moore Omokunde, state representative from the 17th district (2021–present)
- Sandy Pasch, former state representative from the 10th district (2013–2015)
- Daniel Riemer, state representative from the 7th district (2013–2025)
- Kristina Shelton, state representative from the 90th district
- Christine Sinicki, state representative from the 20th district (1999–present)
- Mark Spreitzer, state representative from the 45th district (2015–2023)

Local officials

- Russell Goodwin, former Milwaukee County supervisor from the 18th district (2020–2022)
- Nik Kovac, Milwaukee alderman
- Joe Parisi, Dane County executive
- Katie Rosenberg, mayor of Wausau

Individuals

- Ada Deer, former U.S. assistant secretary of Indian affairs
- Alex Lasry, senior vice president of the Milwaukee Bucks, former intern in the Obama administration and candidate for U.S. Senate in 2022
- Alexander Vindman, retired lieutenant colonel and witness during the first impeachment trial of Donald Trump

Organizations

- Center for Popular Democracy
- Citizen Action of Wisconsin
- Democracy for America
- Democratic Party of Wisconsin
- End Citizens United
- Human Rights Campaign
- Indivisible
- League of Conservation Voters
- Let America Vote
- MarchOn
- MoveOn
- Peace Action
- People for the American Way
- People's Action
- Progressive Change Campaign Committee (previously endorsed Chris Larson)
- Working Families Party

Labor unions

- American Federation of State, County and Municipal Employees
- American Federation of Teachers Local 212
- American Federation of Teachers Wisconsin
- International Brotherhood of Electrical Workers Local 2150
- Service Employees International Union Wisconsin State Council
Sarah Godlewski (withdrawn)

U.S. representatives

- Donna Shalala, former U.S. representative from FL-27 (2019–2021) former U.S. secretary of health and human services (1993–2001) and former president of the University of Wisconsin–Madison (1988–1993)

State legislators

- Sue Conley, state representative (44th district)
- Jodi Emerson, state assemblywoman from the 91st district (2019–)
- Debra Kolste, former state representative (Wisconsin Assembly, District 44)
- Mark F. Miller, former state senator from the 16th district (2005–2021)
- Sylvia Ortiz-Velez, state representative (Wisconsin Assembly, District 8) and Milwaukee County Board supervisor
- Christine Sinicki, state assemblymember for the 20th district (1999–)
- Lena Taylor, state senator
- Don Vruwink, state assemblyman from the 43rd district

Individuals

- Tia Nelson, environmental activist, daughter of former governor and Senator Gaylord Nelson
- John Robinson, former Wausau mayor

Organizations

- Bon Iver, indie folk band
- EMILY's List
- Feminist Majority PAC
- National Organization for Women PAC
- National Women's Political Caucus
Alex Lasry (withdrawn)

State legislators

- Dave Hansen, former state senator (Wisconsin Senate, District 30)
- Shelia Stubbs, state representative (Wisconsin Assembly, District 77)
- Dana Wachs, former state representative (Wisconsin Assembly, District 91)

Local officials

- John Antaramian, mayor, Kenosha, Wisconsin executive
- David Crowley, Milwaukee County executive
- Nikiya Harris Dodd, member of the Milwaukee Common Council
- Joe Donald, judge of the Wisconsin Court of Appeals
- Cavalier Johnson, mayor of Milwaukee
- James Kreuser, former Kenosha County executive
- JoCasta Zamarripa, member of the Milwaukee Common Council

Party officials

- Khary Penebaker, member of the Democratic National Committee
- Joe Wineke, former chair of the Democratic Party of Wisconsin (2005–2009)

Labor unions

- International Alliance of Theatrical Stage Employees Local 18
- International Brotherhood of Electrical Workers Local 494 & 890
- International Union of Bricklayers and Allied Craftworkers of Wisconsin
- Wisconsin Teamsters Joint Council 39
Tom Nelson (withdrawn)

State officials

- Tony Earl, 41st governor of Wisconsin (1983–1987)

State legislators

- Chuck Benedict, former state representative from the 45th district (2005–2011)
- Chris Danou, former state representative from the 92nd district (2009–2017)
- Stan Gruszynski, former state representative from the 71st district (1985–1995)
- Jessica King, former state senator from the 18th district (2011–2013)
- Nick Milroy, state representative from the 73rd district (2009–2023)
- Kelda Roys, state senator from the 26th district (2021–present)
- Donna Seidel, former state representative from the 85th district (2005–2013)
- Gary Sherman, former state representative from the 74th district (1999–2011)
- James Soletski, former state representative from the 88th district (2007–2011)
- David Travis, former Democratic Assembly leader from the 81st district (1979–2009)
- Robert Wirch, state senator from the 22nd district (1997–present)

Local officials

- Mark Becker, former Brown County supervisor (Republican)
- Tony Staskunas, Milwaukee County supervisor
- Sheldon Wasserman, Milwaukee County Board supervisor, former state representative (D-22)

Organizations

- Our Revolution Wisconsin
- Sunrise Movement Wisconsin
- Vote Common Good

Labor unions

- Appleton Fire Fighters I.A.F.F. Local 257
- Grand Chute Fire Fighters I.A.F.F. Local 3655
- Green Bay Fire Fighters I.A.F.F. Local 141
- Operative Plasterers' and Cement Masons' International Association Local 599
- United Electrical Workers western region.
- United Steelworkers Local 2-144

Individuals

- Harvey J. Kaye, historian and sociologist
- Marianne Williamson, political activist, best-selling author and candidate for the Democratic nomination for president of the United States in 2020
Steven Olikara

State officials

- Barbara Lawton, 43rd lieutenant governor of Wisconsin (2003–2011)

Federal officials

- Todd Larson, former USAID official, senior Barack Obama appointee and former United Nations official
- Scott Legwold, former brigadier general in National Guard of the United States and Joint Staff of Wisconsin Army National Guard and Wisconsin Air National Guard
- Aaron S. Williams, 18th director of the Peace Corps under Barack Obama

Judicial officials

- Paul B. Higginbotham, former judge of the Wisconsin Court of Appeals District IV (2003–2017), former Wisconsin Circuit Court judge (1994–2003), and first African American to serve on the Wisconsin Court of Appeals

State legislators

- Amanda Stuck, former state representative from the 57th district

Organizations

- Forward Party

Individuals

- Akon, singer-songwriter and entrepreneur
- Andrew Yang, candidate in the 2020 Democratic Party presidential primaries and the 2021 New York City Democratic mayoral primary

=== Polling ===
Graphical summary

Poll source	Date(s) administered	Sample size (Note: Key: A – all adults RV – registered voters LV – likely voters V – unclear)	Margin of error	Mandela Barnes	Sarah Godlewski	Alex Lasry	Tom Nelson	Other	Undecided
	July 29, 2022	Godlewski withdraws from the race and endorses Barnes							
	July 27, 2022	Lasry withdraws from the race and endorses Barnes							
	July 25, 2022	Nelson withdraws from the race and endorses Barnes							
Impact Research (D) (Note: Poll conducted for Barnes's campaign)	July 12–17, 2022	600 (LV)	± 4.0%	39%	12%	25%	5%	–	18%
Change Research (D) (Note: This poll was sponsored by 314 Action Fund.)	July 1–7, 2022	560 (LV)	± 4.6%	40%	12%	16%	6%	1% (Note: Lee, Olikara, and Williams with 0%)	22%
Marquette University	June 14–20, 2022	381 (LV)	± 6.2%	25%	9%	21%	7%	1% (Note: Peckarsky with 1%; Lewis, Murphy, and Olikara with 0%)	36%
Normington Petts (D) (Note: Poll conducted for Lasry's campaign)	May 18–22, 2022	700 (LV)	± 3.7%	34%	18%	31%	5%	–	12%
Marquette University	April 19–24, 2022	311 (LV)	± 6.6%	19%	7%	16%	5%	2% (Note: Lewis and Peckarsky with 1%; Murphy and Williams with 0%)	49%
Impact Research (D)	March 16–23, 2022	449 (LV)	± 4.6%	38%	9%	17%	8%	3%	26%
Normington Petts (D)	February 23–27, 2022	600 (LV)	± 4.0%	35%	7%	27%	7%	–	24%
Marquette University	February 22–27, 2022	362 (LV)	± 5.7%	23%	3%	13%	5%	5% (Note: Lewis and Murphy with 2%; Battino with 1%; Pecarsky and Williams with 0%)	49%
Impact Research (D)	December 8–16, 2021	842 (LV)	± 3.4%	40%	10%	11%	8%	3%	29%
Data for Progress (D) (Note: Poll conducted for Way to Lead)	November 11–15, 2021	524 (LV)	± 4.0%	39%	5%	16%	6%	5% (Note: "A different candidate" with 3%; Battino and Murphy with 1%; Olikara with 0%)	29%
Normington Petts (D)	November 2021	– (LV)	–	37%	5%	15%	7%	–	36%
Clarity Campaign Labs (D)	August 28–30, 2021	698 (LV)	± 3.7%	37%	7%	5%	8%	3% (Note: Battino, Lewis, and Olikara with 1%)	38%
Normington Petts (D)	August 2021	– (LV)	–	43%	5%	4%	7%	–	41%

=== Results ===
Results by county Barnes: 60–70%; 70–80%; 80–90%

Democratic primary results
Party	Candidate	Votes	%
Democratic	Mandela Barnes	390,279	77.8
Democratic	Alex Lasry (withdrawn)	44,609	8.9
Democratic	Sarah Godlewski (withdrawn)	40,555	8.1
Democratic	Tom Nelson (withdrawn)	10,995	2.2
Democratic	Steven Olikara	5,619	1.1
Democratic	Darrell Williams	3,646	0.7
Democratic	Kou Lee	3,434	0.7
Democratic	Peter Peckarsky	2,446	0.5
Total votes		501,583	100.0

== General election ==
=== Predictions ===
Source	Ranking	As of
The Cook Political Report	Lean R	November 4, 2022
Inside Elections	Tilt R	April 1, 2022
Sabato's Crystal Ball	Lean R	March 1, 2022
Politico	Tossup	April 1, 2022
RCP	Tossup	January 10, 2022
Fox News	Lean R	May 12, 2022
DDHQ	Likely R	August 17, 2022
538	Likely R	October 20, 2022
The Economist	Likely R	November 1, 2022

=== Debates ===
2022 United States Senate general election in Wisconsin debates
No.	Date	Host	Moderator	Link	Republican	Democratic
Key: P Participant A Absent N Non-invitee I Invitee W Withdrawn						
Key: P Participant A Absent N Non-invitee I Invitee W Withdrawn					Ron Johnson	Mandela Barnes
1	Oct. 7, 2022	Wisconsin Broadcasters Association	Jill Geisler		P	P
2	Oct. 13, 2022	Marquette University	Charles Benson; Shannon Sims		P	P

=== Endorsements ===
Ron Johnson (R)

U.S. executive branch officials

- John Bolton, U.S. national security advisor (2018–2019), United States ambassador to the United Nations (2005–2006)
- Nikki Haley, former U.S. ambassador to the United Nations (2017–2018)
- Donald Trump, 45th president of the United States (2017–2021)

State officials

- Ron DeSantis, governor of Florida (2019–present)

U.S. representatives

- Bryan Steil, U.S. representative from WI-01 (2019–present)

State legislators

- Don Pridemore, state representative from the 22nd district (2011–2015) and the 99th district (2005–2011)

Organizations

- Americans for Prosperity Action
- Campaign for Working Families
- Huck PAC
- National Federation of Independent Business
- National Republican Senatorial Committee
- NRA Political Victory Fund
- Republican Jewish Coalition PAC
- Republican Party of Wisconsin
- Tavern League of Wisconsin
- Tea Party Express
Mandela Barnes (D)

U.S. executive branch officials

- Pete Buttigieg, United States secretary of transportation (2021–2025)
- Ada Deer, former U.S. assistant secretary of Indian affairs
- Eric Holder, United States attorney general (2009–2015)
- Barack Obama, 44th president of the United States (2009–2017)

U.S. senators

- Tammy Baldwin, U.S. senator from Wisconsin (2013–present)
- Cory Booker, U.S. senator from New Jersey (2013–present)
- Amy Klobuchar, U.S. senator from Minnesota (2007-present)
- Chris Murphy, U.S. senator from Connecticut (2013–present)
- Bernie Sanders, U.S. senator from Vermont (2007–present) (Independent)
- Elizabeth Warren, U.S. senator from Massachusetts (2013–present)

U.S. representatives

- Jim Clyburn, U.S. representative from SC-06 (1993–present), House majority whip (2019–2023, 2007–2011), House assistant Democratic leader (2011–2019), chair of the Congressional Black Caucus (1999–2001)
- Ruben Gallego, U.S. representative from Arizona's 7th congressional district (2015–2023)
- Ron Kind, U.S. representative from WI-03 (1997–2023)
- Gwen Moore, U.S. representative from WI-04 (2005–present)
- Alexandria Ocasio-Cortez, U.S. representative from NY-14 (2019–present)
- Mark Pocan, U.S. representative from WI-02 (2013–present)
- Katie Porter, U.S. representative from CA-45 (2019–2025)

State officials

- Tony Evers, governor of Wisconsin (2019–present)
- John Fetterman, 34th lieutenant governor of Pennsylvania (2019–2023), and Democratic nominee for U.S. Senate in Pennsylvania
- Sarah Godlewski, 36th treasurer of Wisconsin (2019–2023) and candidate for U.S. Senate in 2022

State legislators

- Jimmy P. Anderson, state representative from the 47th district (2017–present)
- Jonathan Brostoff, state representative from the 19th district (2015–present)
- Marisabel Cabrera, state representative from the 9th district (2019–present)
- Tim Carpenter, state senator from the 3rd district (2003–present)
- Steve Doyle, state representative from the 94th district (2011–present)
- Gary Hebl, state representative from the 46th district
- Francesca Hong, state representative from the 76th district
- La Tonya Johnson, state senator from the 6th district (2017–present)
- Fred Kessler, former state representative from the 12th district (2005–2019)
- Chris Larson, state senator from the 7th district (2011–present)
- Tom Nelson, Outagamie County executive, former majority leader of the Wisconsin Assembly, nominee for lieutenant governor of Wisconsin in 2010, for Wisconsin's 8th congressional district in 2016 and candidate for U.S. Senate in 2022
- Tod Ohnstad, state representative from the 65th district (2013–present)
- Supreme Moore Omokunde, state representative from the 17th district (2021–present)
- Sandy Pasch, former state representative from the 10th district (2013–2015)
- Daniel Riemer, state representative from the 7th district (2013–present)
- Kristina Shelton, state representative from the 90th district
- Christine Sinicki, state representative from the 20th district (1999–present)
- Mark Spreitzer, state representative from the 45th district (2015–present)

Local officials

- Nik Kovac, Milwaukee alderman
- Joe Parisi, Dane County executive
- Katie Rosenberg, mayor of Wausau

Individuals

- LeVar Burton, actor
- Don Cheadle, actor
- Natalia Cordova-Buckley, actress
- Rosario Dawson, actress
- Clark Gregg, actor and director
- Mike Holmgren, former head coach of the Green Bay Packers
- Alex Lasry, senior vice president of the Milwaukee Bucks, former intern in the Obama administration and candidate for U.S. Senate in 2022
- Mark Ruffalo, actor and activist
- Alexander Vindman, retired lieutenant colonel
- Bradley Whitford, actor
- Oprah Winfrey, businesswoman and talk show host

Organizations

- Center for Popular Democracy
- Citizen Action WIsconsin
- Democracy for America
- Democratic Party of Wisconsin
- End Citizens United
- Fair Wisconsin
- Human Rights Campaign
- Indivisible
- J Street
- Jewish Dems
- League of Conservation Voters
- Let America Vote
- MarchOn
- MoveOn
- NARAL Pro-Choice America
- People for the American Way
- People's Action
- Planned Parenthood Action Fund
- Progressive Change Campaign Committee
- Sierra Club
- Sunrise Movement
- Working Families Party

Labor unions

- American Federation of State, County and Municipal Employees
- American Federation of Teachers Wisconsin
- American Federation of Teachers Local 212
- International Brotherhood of Electrical Workers Locals 494, 890 & 2150
- National Education Association
- Service Employees International Union Wisconsin State Council

Newspapers

- The Capital Times
- Milwaukee Courier
- Milwaukee Journal Sentinel
- Shepherd Express
- Wisconsin State Journal

=== Polling ===
Aggregate polls

Source of poll aggregation	Dates administered	Dates updated	Ron Johnson (R)	Mandela Barnes (D)	Undecided (Note: Calculated by taking the difference of 100% and all other candidates combined.)	Margin
RealClearPolitics	October 24 – November 5, 2022	November 8, 2022	50.2%	46.6%	3.2%	Johnson +3.6
FiveThirtyEight	August 15 – November 8, 2022	November 8, 2022	50.4%	47.0%	2.6%	Johnson +3.4
270toWin	November 3–7, 2022	November 7, 2022	50.2%	46.6%	3.2%	Johnson +3.6
Average			50.3%	46.7%	3.0%	Johnson +3.6

Graphical summary

Poll source	Date(s) administered	Sample size	Margin of error	Ron Johnson (R)	Mandela Barnes (D)	Other	Undecided
Civiqs	November 4–7, 2022	739 (LV)	± 3.7%	50%	49%	–	1%
Research Co.	November 4–6, 2022	450 (LV)	± 4.6%	51%	45%	–	4%
Data for Progress (D)	November 2–5, 2022	1,504 (LV)	± 2.0%	53%	47%	–	–
The Trafalgar Group (R)	November 2–4, 2022	1,095 (LV)	± 2.9%	50%	47%	–	3%
Marquette University	October 24 – November 1, 2022	802 (RV)	± 4.6%	48%	45%	5% (Note: "Refused" with 3%; "Neither" with 2%)	1%
Marquette University	October 24 – November 1, 2022	679 (LV)	± 4.8%	50%	48%	1% (Note: "Refused" with 1%)	1%
Clarity Campaign Labs (D)	October 27–31, 2022	888 (LV)	± 3.3%	46%	48%	–	6%
Siena College	October 27–31, 2022	655 (LV)	± 4.8%	47%	45%	2% (Note: "Another candidate" with 1%; "Not going to vote" with 1%)	6%
Fox News	October 26–30, 2022	1,000 (RV)	± 3.0%	48%	45%	3% (Note: "Other" with 2%; "Wouldn't vote" with 1%)	5%
Wick Insights	October 26–30, 2022	1,089 (LV)	± 3.2%	50%	46%	2% (Note: "Someone else" with 2%)	2%
Emerson College	October 27–29, 2022	1,000 (LV)	± 3.0%	50%	46%	2%	3%
Emerson College	October 27–29, 2022	1,000 (LV)	± 3.0%	51%	46%	3% (Note: "Someone else" with 3%)	–
Patriot Polling	October 20–23, 2022	801 (RV)	–	52%	43%	–	5%
Data for Progress (D)	October 14–22, 2022	1,376 (LV)	± 3.0%	51%	46%	–	2%
CNN/SSRS	October 13–17, 2022	905 (RV)	± 4.2%	45%	48%	5% (Note: "Neither" with 4%; "Other" with 1%)	1%
CNN/SSRS	October 13–17, 2022	714 (LV)	± 4.5%	50%	49%	1% (Note: "Neither" with 1%)	–
Clarity Campaign Labs (D)	October 7–11, 2022	874 (LV)	± 3.3%	47%	48%	–	5%
Marquette University	October 3–9, 2022	801 (RV)	± 4.3%	47%	47%	5% (Note: "Neither" with 4%; "Refused" with 1%)	2%
Marquette University	October 3–9, 2022	652 (LV)	± 4.8%	52%	46%	2% (Note: "Neither" with 1%; "Refused" with 1%)	1%
YouGov/CBS News	October 3–7, 2022	1,138 (RV)	± 3.7%	50%	49%	–	1%
Public Policy Polling (D)	September 26–27, 2022	574 (V)	–	47%	47%	–	6%
Fox News	September 22–26, 2022	1,012 (RV)	± 3.0%	48%	44%	3% (Note: "Wouldn't vote" with 2%; "Other" with 1%)	5%
Fabrizio Ward (R)/Impact Research (D)	September 18–25, 2022	1399 (LV)	± 4.4%	51%	46%	–	5%
Data for Progress (D)	September 20–23, 2022	999 (LV)	± 3.0%	50%	48%	–	3%
The Trafalgar Group (R)	September 15–19, 2022	1087 (LV)	± 2.9%	49%	47%	–	5%
Emerson College	September 16–18, 2022	860 (LV)	± 3.27%	48%	44%	3%	6%
Big Data Poll (R)	September 17–18, 2022	852 (LV)	± 3.4%	49%	46%	–	–
Siena College	September 14–15, 2022	651 (LV)	± 4.5%	47%	48%	2%	4%
OnMessage Inc. (R) (Note: This poll was sponsored by the NRSC.)	September 11–13, 2022	800 (LV)	–	49%	45%	–	6%
Civiqs	September 10–13, 2022	780 (LV)	± 3.7%	49%	48%	1%	2%
Marquette University	September 6–11, 2022	801 (RV)	± 4.3%	48%	47%	–	5%
Marquette University	September 6–11, 2022	632 (LV)	± 4.7%	49%	48%	–	3%
The Trafalgar Group (R)	August 22–25, 2022	1,091 (LV)	± 2.9%	47%	49%	–	4%
Fox News	August 12–16, 2022	1,006 (RV)	± 3.0%	46%	50%	1%	4%
Marquette University	August 10–15, 2022	811 (RV)	± 4.2%	44%	51%	1%	4%
Marquette University	August 10–15, 2022	713 (LV)	± 4.5%	45%	52%	0%	3%
Marquette University	June 14–20, 2022	803 (RV)	± 4.3%	44%	46%	1%	8%
Clarity Campaign Labs (D)	September 8–11, 2021	756 (LV)	± 3.6%	43%	43%	–	14%

Hypothetical polling

Ron Johnson vs. Sarah Godlewski

Poll source	Date(s) administered	Sample size	Margin of error	Ron Johnson (R)	Sarah Godlewski (D)	Other	Undecided
Marquette University	June 14–20, 2022	803 (RV)	± 4.3%	43%	45%	2%	10%
Clarity Campaign Labs (D)	September 8–11, 2021	756 (LV)	± 3.6%	44%	41%	–	15%

Ron Johnson vs. Alex Lasry

Poll source	Date(s) administered	Sample size	Margin of error	Ron Johnson (R)	Alex Lasry (D)	Other	Undecided
Marquette University	June 14–20, 2022	803 (RV)	± 4.3%	45%	42%	2%	11%
Clarity Campaign Labs (D)	September 8–11, 2021	756 (LV)	± 3.6%	45%	41%	–	14%

Ron Johnson vs. Tom Nelson

Poll source	Date(s) administered	Sample size	Margin of error	Ron Johnson (R)	Tom Nelson (D)	Other	Undecided
Marquette University	June 14–20, 2022	803 (RV)	± 4.3%	43%	44%	2%	11%
Change Research (D) (Note: This poll was sponsored by Nelson's campaign.)	March 25–27, 2021	1,723 (LV)	± 2.6%	44%	48%	–	5%

=== Results ===
2022 United States Senate election in Wisconsin
Party	Candidate	Votes	%	±%
Republican	Ron Johnson (incumbent)	1,337,185	50.41%	+0.24%
Democratic	Mandela Barnes	1,310,467	49.41%	+2.60%
Independent	Adam Paul (write-in)	67	0.00%	N/A
Write-in		4,758	0.18%	+0.13%
Total votes		2,652,477	100.00%	N/A
Republican hold				

==== By county ====
By county

County	Ron Johnson Republican		Mandela Barnes Democratic		Write-in Various		Margin		Total votes
County	#	%	#	%	#	%	#	%	Total votes
Adams	6,202	62.75	3,644	36.87	38	0.38	2,558	25.88	9,884
Ashland	3,074	44.00	3,903	55.87	9	0.13	-829	-11.87	6,986
Barron	12,928	64.39	7,121	35.46	30	0.15	5,807	28.92	20,079
Bayfield	4,082	43.99	5,183	55.85	15	0.16	-1,101	-11.86	9,280
Brown	62,221	54.64	51,421	45.15	237	0.21	10,800	9.48	113,879
Buffalo	3,907	63.86	2,201	35.98	10	0.16	1,706	27.88	6,118
Burnett	5,362	65.42	2,834	34.58	0	0.00	2,528	30.84	8,196
Calumet	15,466	61.99	9,444	37.85	41	0.16	6,022	24.14	24,951
Chippewa	17,694	61.39	11,069	38.40	60	0.21	6,625	22.99	28,823
Clark	8,181	70.20	3,451	29.61	22	0.19	4,730	40.59	11,654
Columbia	13,899	50.78	13,410	48.99	64	0.23	489	1.79	27,373
Crawford	3,797	54.33	3,179	45.49	13	0.19	618	8.84	6,989
Dane	68,228	22.69	231,818	77.09	682	0.23	-163,590	-54.40	300,728
Dodge	25,914	66.89	12,830	33.11	0	0.00	13,084	33.77	38,744
Door	8,685	50.14	8,611	49.71	26	0.15	74	0.43	17,322
Douglas	8,373	44.86	10,270	55.02	22	0.12	-1,897	-10.16	18,665
Dunn	10,544	57.24	7,876	42.76	0	0.00	2,668	14.48	18,420
Eau Claire	21,208	44.32	26,529	55.44	115	0.24	-5,321	-11.12	47,852
Florence	1,898	75.38	620	24.62	0	0.00	1,278	50.75	2,518
Fond du Lac	30,584	65.63	15,982	34.29	38	0.08	14,602	31.33	46,604
Forest	2,785	66.90	1,371	32.93	7	0.17	1,414	33.97	4,163
Grant	11,397	56.68	8,671	43.12	41	0.20	2,726	13.56	20,109
Green	8,350	47.77	9,097	52.04	33	0.19	-747	-4.27	17,480
Green Lake	6,061	69.73	2,626	30.21	5	0.06	3,435	39.52	8,692
Iowa	5,082	43.73	6,514	56.05	25	0.22	-1,432	-12.32	11,621
Iron	2,064	63.22	1,197	36.66	4	0.12	867	26.55	3,265
Jackson	4,700	58.84	3,288	41.16	0	0.00	1,412	17.68	7,988
Jefferson	22,402	58.03	16,141	41.81	64	0.17	6,261	16.22	38,607
Juneau	6,944	64.62	3,782	35.19	20	0.19	3,162	29.42	10,746
Kenosha	34,393	52.17	31,371	47.59	159	0.24	3,022	4.58	65,923
Kewaunee	6,627	66.80	3,273	32.99	20	0.20	3,354	33.81	9,920
La Crosse	24,413	44.21	30,695	55.58	115	0.21	-6,282	-11.38	55,223
Lafayette	3,779	57.55	2,787	42.45	0	0.00	992	15.11	6,566
Langlade	6,190	68.72	2,818	31.28	0	0.00	3,372	37.43	9,008
Lincoln	8,541	63.31	4,920	36.47	29	0.21	3,621	26.84	13,490
Manitowoc	22,561	62.81	13,288	37.00	69	0.19	9,273	25.82	35,918
Marathon	37,527	60.98	23,912	38.85	103	0.17	13,615	22.12	61,542
Marinette	12,677	68.39	5,816	31.38	42	0.23	6,861	37.02	18,535
Marquette	4,753	64.64	2,589	35.21	11	0.15	2,164	29.43	7,353
Menominee	264	21.53	962	78.47	0	0.00	-698	-56.93	1,226
Milwaukee	103,666	29.78	243,638	70.00	755	0.22	-139,972	-40.22	348,059
Monroe	10,801	62.39	6,461	37.32	49	0.28	4,340	25.07	17,311
Oconto	13,961	71.47	5,527	28.29	47	0.24	8,434	43.17	19,535
Oneida	11,866	58.78	8,279	41.01	41	0.20	3,587	17.77	20,186
Outagamie	47,805	55.76	37,922	44.24	0	0.00	9,883	11.53	85,727
Ozaukee	30,209	57.77	21,954	41.98	130	0.25	8,255	15.79	52,293
Pepin	2,122	64.30	1,177	35.67	1	0.03	945	28.64	3,300
Pierce	10,313	57.18	7,709	42.74	15	0.08	2,604	14.44	18,037
Polk	13,132	64.22	7,313	35.77	2	0.01	5,819	28.46	20,447
Portage	16,339	48.66	17,186	51.19	50	0.15	-847	-2.52	33,575
Price	4,584	65.05	2,459	34.89	4	0.06	2,125	30.15	7,047
Racine	44,221	54.13	37,252	45.60	218	0.27	6,969	8.53	81,691
Richland	3,827	54.58	3,173	45.25	12	0.17	654	9.33	7,012
Rock	28,758	44.28	36,024	55.47	160	0.25	-7,266	-11.19	64,942
Rusk	4,326	67.76	2,056	32.21	2	0.03	2,270	35.56	6,384
Sauk	14,289	49.43	14,618	50.57	0	0.00	-329	-1.14	28,907
Sawyer	4,949	57.82	3,597	42.03	13	0.15	1,352	15.80	8,559
Shawano	12,415	69.31	5,495	30.68	2	0.01	6,920	38.63	17,912
Sheboygan	32,058	59.88	21,350	39.88	129	0.24	10,708	20.00	53,537
St. Croix	26,143	59.39	17,827	40.50	52	0.12	8,316	18.89	44,022
Taylor	6,527	75.40	2,130	24.60	0	0.00	4,397	50.79	8,657
Trempealeau	7,322	59.75	4,920	40.15	13	0.11	2,402	19.60	12,255
Vernon	6,950	52.76	6,206	47.11	18	0.14	744	5.65	13,174
Vilas	8,350	63.37	4,803	36.45	24	0.18	3,547	26.92	13,177
Walworth	27,995	60.95	17,824	38.81	112	0.24	10,171	22.14	45,931
Washburn	5,277	63.16	3,074	36.79	4	0.05	2,203	26.37	8,355
Washington	52,401	70.84	21,566	29.16	0	0.00	30,835	41.69	73,967
Waukesha	140,156	62.55	83,408	37.22	509	0.23	56,748	25.33	224,073
Waupaca	15,525	66.86	7,653	32.96	42	0.18	7,872	33.90	23,220
Waushara	7,765	68.50	3,567	31.47	3	0.03	4,198	37.04	11,335
Winnebago	39,372	52.91	34,860	46.84	185	0.25	4,512	6.06	74,417
Wood	20,004	60.63	12,925	39.17	64	0.19	7,079	21.46	32,993
Totals	1,337,185	50.41	1,310,467	49.41	4,825	0.18	26,718	1.01	2,652,477

Counties that flipped from Democratic to Republican

- Columbia (largest municipality: Portage)
- Crawford (largest municipality: Prairie du Chien)
- Lafayette (largest municipality: Darlington)
- Richland (largest municipality: Richland Center)
- Vernon (largest municipality: Viroqua)

==== By congressional district ====
Johnson won six of eight congressional districts.

District	Johnson	Barnes	Representative
1st	52%	48%	Bryan Steil
2nd	28%	72%	Mark Pocan
3rd	53%	47%	Ron Kind (117th Congress)
3rd	53%	47%	Derrick Van Orden (118th Congress)
4th	23%	77%	Gwen Moore
5th	63%	37%	Scott L. Fitzgerald
6th	59%	41%	Glenn Grothman
7th	61%	39%	Tom Tiffany
8th	59%	41%	Mike Gallagher

== See also ==
- 2022 United States Senate elections
- 2022 Wisconsin elections

== Notes ==
Partisan clients
