= Priscilla Prado =

American politician (born 1983)

Member of the Wisconsin State Assembly from the 9th district
- Incumbent
- Assumed office January 6, 2025
- Preceded by: Marisabel Cabrera

Personal details
- Born: Priscilla Ann Martinez; November 7, 1983 (age 42) Los Angeles, California, U.S.
- Party: Democratic
- Spouse: Jorge Angel Prado (div. 2020)
- Children: 4
- Education: Alverno College (B.B.A.)
- Occupation: Accountant, business owner, politician
- Website: Campaign website

Priscilla Ann Prado (née Martinez; born November 7, 1983) is an American accountant, business owner, and Democratic politician from Milwaukee, Wisconsin. She is a member of the Wisconsin State Assembly, representing Wisconsin's 9th Assembly district since January 2025.

== Early life and career ==
Priscilla Prado was born Priscilla Ann Martinez in November 1983, in Los Angeles, California. She was raised and educated in Los Angeles. As an adult, she moved to Milwaukee, Wisconsin. She attended Milwaukee Area Technical College, then received her bachelor's degree in business administration from Alverno College, a private Catholic women's college in Milwaukee.

In 2011, she went to work for the accounting firm Michael Best & Friedrich LLP, at their Milwaukee headquarters. She then worked as director of administrative services for three Catholic parishes in Milwaukee, and worked as a staff accountant for Monster.com.

While working at Monster, she became involved in tax preparation services for Spanish-speaking Milwaukee area small business owners. Through this work, she became co-owner of Ambas Financial Services LLC in 2017. In 2019, she started her own accounting business, Midwest Bookkeeping & Tax Solutions, which has been her primary occupation since.

== Political career ==
At the 2024 Spring election, state representative Marisabel Cabrera was elected a Wisconsin circuit court judge, and would therefore have to resign her seat in the Wisconsin State Assembly. Just days after the Spring election, Prado announced that she would run as a Democrat to succeed Cabrera in the 9th Assembly district. The 9th district comprised much of the southwest side of the city of Milwaukee, and is one of two Wisconsin Assembly districts with a majority-Hispanic electorate.

Prado was not the first Democrat to enter the race, however, and faced a primary election against 21-year-old Milwaukee Area Technical College student Deisy España. España earned endorsements from progressive organizations, including the Wisconsin Working Families Party, Citizen Action Wisconsin, Voces de la Frontera, Wisconsin Muslim Civic Alliance, and had outspoken support from progressive lawmakers Ryan Clancy, Francesca Hong, and Darrin Madison. Prado, however, was supported by institutional organizations, such as Milwaukee Professional Firefighters Local 215, the Milwaukee Police Association, and the Wisconsin Realtors Association, and was supported by neighboring-district Hispanic state representative Sylvia Ortiz-Velez. Prado prevailed in the primary with 69% of the vote, and went on to defeat perennial Republican candidate Ryan Antczak in the general election. She was sworn in as a member of the Assembly on January 6, 2025.

== Personal life and family ==
Priscilla Martinez took the last name Prado when she married Jorge Angel Prado; they divorced in 2020. She has two adult children and two school-age children and resides on Milwaukee's south side.

== Electoral history ==
=== Wisconsin Assembly (2024) ===
Year	Election	Date	Elected				Defeated				Total	Plurality
2024	Primary	Aug. 13	Priscilla Prado	Democratic	2,000	69.01%	Deisy España	Dem.	880	30.37%	2,898	1,120
2024	General	Nov. 5	Priscilla Prado	Democratic	12,449	70.19%	Ryan Antczak	Rep.	5,234	29.51%	17,737	7,215
2026	Primary	Aug. 11	Priscilla A. Prado	Democratic	3,019	70.67%	Mimi Reza	Dem.	1,237	28.96%	4,272	1,782

Wisconsin State Assembly
Preceded by Marisabel Cabrera	Member of the Wisconsin State Assembly from the 9th district January 6, 2025 – present	Incumbent
