= Josh Zepnick =

American politician

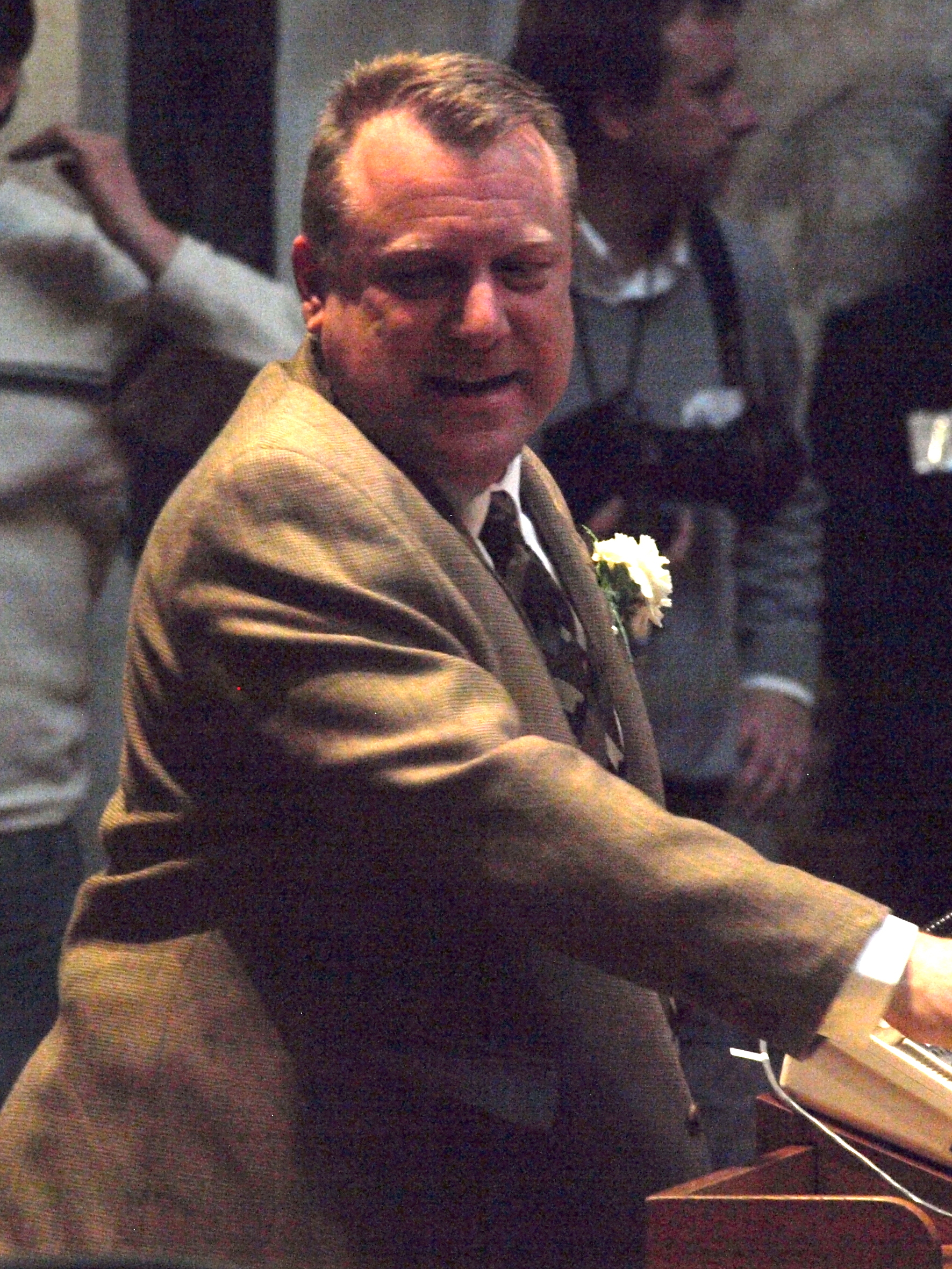
- Zepnick in 2013

Member of the Wisconsin State Assembly from the 9th district
- In office January 1, 2003 – January 1, 2019
- Preceded by: Tim Carpenter
- Succeeded by: Marisabel Cabrera

Personal details
- Born: March 21, 1968 (age 58) Milwaukee, Wisconsin, U.S.
- Party: Democratic
- Education: University of Wisconsin–Madison, University of Minnesota

Josh Zepnick (born March 21, 1968) is a former Democratic Party member of the Wisconsin State Assembly, representing the 9th Assembly District from 2003 until 2019.

== Biography ==
Born in Milwaukee, Wisconsin, Zepnick received a bachelor's degree from the University of Wisconsin–Madison and a Masters in Public Policy from the University of Minnesota. He has worked for the Milwaukee Jobs Initiative, the Milwaukee Community Service Corps, the Urban Economic Development Association of Wisconsin, and the Center for Democracy and Citizenship, and has been an aide to Wisconsin State Senator Bob Jauch and Congressman David R. Obey.

== Legislative career ==
Zepnick has served in the Wisconsin State Assembly from 2003 to 2019. He served the minority caucus sergeant at arms from 2011 to 2019. During his time in office he also served on the Committee on Energy and Utilities, the Committee on Financial Institutions, the Committee on Interstate Affairs, the Committee on Ways and Means, State and Federal Relations, State and Local Finance committees, Legislative Council Study Task Forces, the Governor's Council on Workforce Investment, and the Speaker's Task Force on Mental Health until he was removed from legislative committee assignments.

In 2009, Zepnick proposed a bill to require sobriety of bartenders and limit "all-you-can-drink" specials. In 2015, Zepnick admitted to drunk driving after he was arrested for a traffic violation in Greenfield, Wisconsin.

=== Allegations of misconduct ===
In 2017, two women accused Zepnick of kissing them against their will at political events. Zepnick apologized and says the episodes should not prevent him from serving in the Assembly. He was eventually removed from legislative committee assignments.

Zepnick ran for re-election in 2018 but was defeated in the Democratic primary by Marisabel Cabrera.

== County board race ==
In April 2022, Zepnick was a candidate for the Milwaukee County board of supervisors. He lost his race by 17 votes to union organizer Juan Miguel Martinez. A challenge to the election results would have cost about $5,000, and Zepnick (who said he'd been sober now for about six and a half years) instead conceded, and wished Martinez well.
