= Alex Lasry =

American sports manager (born 1987)

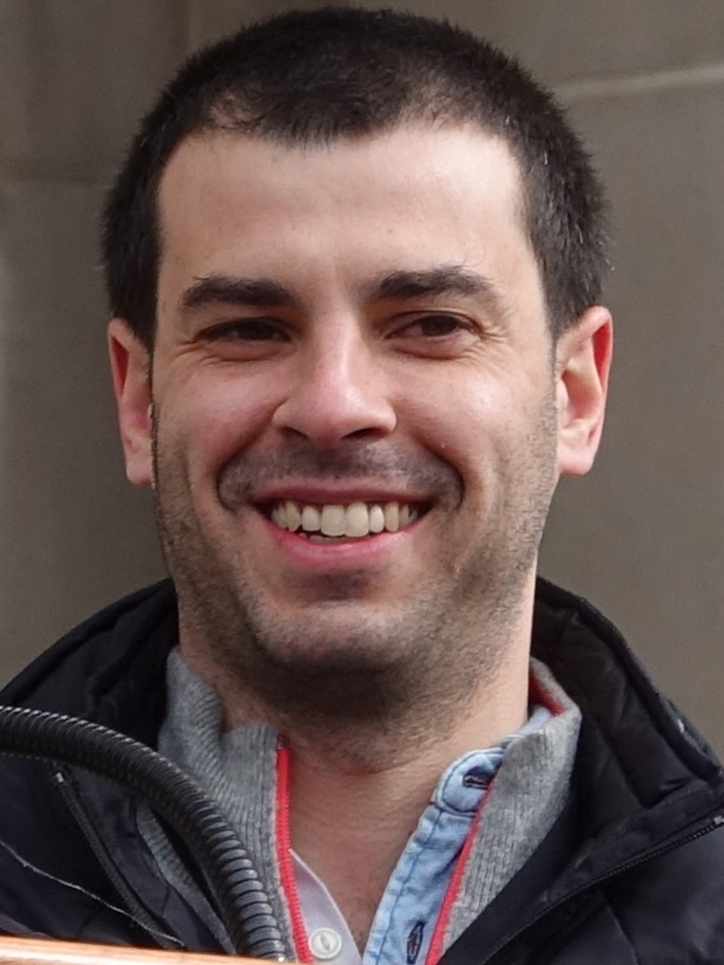
- Born: Alexander Jacob Lasry; July 15, 1987 (age 39); New York City, US
- Education: University of Pennsylvania (BA); New York University (MBA)
- Occupation: Businessman
- Employer: FIFA World Cup 26 New York New Jersey Host Committee
- Political party: Democratic
- Spouse: Lauren Markowitz
- Relatives: Marc Lasry (father)

Alexander Jacob Lasry (born in 1987) is an American businessperson and former executive of the Milwaukee Bucks of the National Basketball Association (NBA). He is the chief executive officer of the 2026 FIFA World Cup New York New Jersey Host Committee. Lasry was a Democratic candidate in the 2022 United States Senate election in Wisconsin, but withdrew before the primary. He is the son of former Milwaukee Bucks co-owner Marc Lasry.

== Early life and education ==
Alex Lasry was born in New York City to Marc and Cathy Lasry (née Cohen). He graduated from Trevor Day School, where his mother served as a board member. He then went on to graduate cum laude with honors in political science from the University of Pennsylvania in 2009 and receive his MBA from the New York University Leonard Stern School of Business in 2014. His parents funded two endowed professorships at Penn.

== Career ==
=== Government service ===
After graduating from UPenn, Lasry spent two months with the American Israel Public Affairs Committee followed by four months as an analyst with Goldman Sachs. At the time, Lasry's father was a client of Goldman Sachs. He worked in the White House during the Obama administration from 2009 to 2012. His father donated more than $500,000 to the Barack Obama 2012 presidential campaign. Lasry went on to become Special Assistant to the Chief of Staff to Senior Advisor Valerie Jarrett, and then Deputy Counselor for Strategic Engagement to the Senior Advisor where he worked on business outreach and the Jobs Council.

In December 2023, Lasry was sworn in as Deputy Assistant Secretary for Travel and Tourism at the International Trade Administration within the U.S. Department of Commerce. He also served as the finance chair for the 2020 Democratic National Convention before running for the United States Senate in 2022.

=== Sports and business career ===
After receiving his MBA in 2014, Lasry moved to Milwaukee when his family purchased the Milwaukee Bucks. He served as the team's senior vice president and was a member of the Bucks' management committee. He later left the organization following changes in team ownership.

While serving as finance chair of the Milwaukee Host Committee, Lasry was involved in Milwaukee's bid to host the 2020 Democratic National Convention at Fiserv Forum, though the event was later held virtually due to the COVID-19 pandemic.

=== Senate campaign ===
Lasry was a Democratic candidate in the 2022 United States Senate election in Wisconsin. During his campaign, he touted his work championing union jobs and a $15 minimum wage with the Bucks, which was a requirement in the arena funding deal. Reports showed that specifics of the deal the Bucks agreed to for public financing said they did not have to institute a universal $15 minimum wage until 2023. As such, the team was still hiring non-union labor at a rate of $12.50 to $14/hr depending on experience levels for many years and Deer District workers were only earning $10 an hour as of May 2019. The team has said they had agreed to speed up the deal and started paying a $15 minimum wage in 2020.

=== FIFA World Cup 2026 ===
In February 2025, Lasry was appointed chief executive officer of the FIFA World Cup 2026 New York New Jersey Host Committee. In this role, he oversees fundraising, planning and coordination for hosting FIFA World Cup 2026 matches in New York and New Jersey.

== Political positions ==
Lasry has expressed support for a $15 minimum wage, the Protecting the Right to Organize Act, the notion of eliminating the filibuster, and the John Lewis Voting Rights Act.

== Controversies and disputes ==
Lasry has been involved in Bucks' conflict with the unions caused by hiring non-union workers with lower wages which team reps originally described as "a matter of economics". Lasry also continues to own shares in Amazon, which he has refused to sell, despite criticizing the company.

While running for the U.S. Senate, Lasry received an extension in May 2022 to not disclose his financial assets until after the Wisconsin Democratic Senate primary in August 2022.

In August 2020, when members of the Bucks supposedly leaked to NBA reporter Shams Charania that they were attempting to reach Wisconsin Attorney General Josh Kaul after the Kenosha police shooting of Jacob Blake, records show that Lasry texted a staffer of Kaul's to say that he "yelled at the players" over the leak.

Lasry was accused of cutting in line because he received his COVID vaccine at the time when only seniors were eligible for shots in Wisconsin. He said his wife's uncle contacted her about unused doses that would go to waste. She declined the shot because of her pregnancy, and Lasry took it instead.

== Personal life ==
Lasry is married and has three children. In 2021, he purchased a historic mansion on Milwaukee's east side. In 2025, he purchased a $21 million penthouse on the Upper West Side of Manhattan.
