= Barbara Notestein =

American politician

Member of the Wisconsin State Assembly
- In office January 7, 1985 – January 5, 1999
- Preceded by: Barbara Ulichny
- Succeeded by: John Richards
- Constituency: 12th District (1985-1993); 19th District (1993-1999)

Personal details
- Born: Barbara Notestein; April 14, 1949 (age 77) Madison, Wisconsin
- Party: Democratic

Barbara Notestein (born April 14, 1949) is an American social worker from Wisconsin who served as a member of the Wisconsin State Assembly and is now executive director of Safe and Sound, a crime prevention organization.

== Background ==
Notestein was born on April 14, 1949, in Madison, Wisconsin, and grew up in Whitefish Bay, Wisconsin. She is a graduate of Whitefish Bay High School. She earned a B.A. from Beloit College in 1971, and an M.S.W. in 1975 from the University of Michigan. Notestein was a VISTA volunteer, became a social worker, and worked eight years for the Hunger Task Force of Milwaukee, eventually becoming its director.

== Public office ==
From 1983-1984, Notestein (a member and former president of the National Women's Political Caucus of Milwaukee and member of the N.O.W. was a member of the Wisconsin Women's Council. She was first elected to the Assembly in 1984 as a Democrat from the newly renumbered 12th [formerly 4th] Assembly district (basically the East Side of Milwaukee) to succeed fellow Democrat Barbara Ulichny, who was successfully pursuing election to the Wisconsin State Senate. Notestein narrowly defeated gay rights activist Leon Rouse in the Democratic primary (1740-1657 in a three-way race), but carried the general election easily, with 15,606 votes to 8137 for Republican C. William Jordahl.

In later years, she faced no serious challenge in the primary or general elections, even after redistricting changed the boundaries of her own district (now the 19th District) to the south; in some general elections, her only challenge came from candidates of the Taxpayer's Party. From 1991-1994 she was Assistant Majority Leader. She chose not to seek re-election in 1998, citing in part the frustration of minority status since 1994 for Assembly Democrats, and was succeeded by fellow Democrat Jon Richards.

Notestein was appointed by President Clinton to serve in his administration as Administrator of the U.S. Small Business Administration Midwest Regional Office.

== Safe and Sound ==
Notestein was executive director of Safe and Sound for 10 years. Notestein was honored by the White House in 2011 as a White House Champion of Change.
