= Jonathan Brostoff =

American politician (1983–2024)

Member of the Milwaukee Common Council from the 3rd District
- In office November 15, 2022 – November 4, 2024
- Preceded by: Nik Kovac
- Succeeded by: Alex Brower

Member of the Wisconsin State Assembly from the 19th district
- In office January 3, 2015 – November 15, 2022
- Preceded by: Jon Richards
- Succeeded by: Ryan Clancy

Personal details
- Born: September 25, 1983 Milwaukee, Wisconsin, U.S
- Died: November 4, 2024 (aged 41) West Allis, Wisconsin, U.S.
- Cause of death: Suicide
- Party: Democratic
- Spouse: Diana Vang
- Children: 4
- Education: University of Wisconsin–Milwaukee (B.A.)

Jonathan Brostoff (September 25, 1983 – November 4, 2024) was an American Democratic politician from Milwaukee, Wisconsin. He was a member of the Wisconsin State Assembly, representing Wisconsin's 19th Assembly district from 2015 through 2022. He subsequently served on the Milwaukee Common Council from 2022 until his death in November 2024.

== Early life ==
Jonathan Brostoff was born and raised in Milwaukee, Wisconsin. He began working and volunteering for area non-profit organizations from the age of 14; he was a youth facilitator for "The Other America Tour," a social justice public education program for high school students in Wisconsin that was organized by the ACLU of Wisconsin and worked for several years with Pathfinders Milwaukee, a non-profit that provides shelter and support for homeless or at-risk teens.

After graduating from Milwaukee High School of the Arts, Brostoff joined AmeriCorps and was matched with Milwaukee's Family Support Center, a homeless shelter. In his role at the shelter, Brostoff worked to get free legal assistance for shelter residents, ran a day-care center, recruited volunteers, and coordinated other entertainment and enrichment programming. During that time, he also began volunteering with Tikkun Ha-Ir ("Repairing the City"), an organization that engages Milwaukee's Jewish community in civic activities. He became a member of that group's board in 2008.

After his term with AmeriCorps ended, he resumed his education at the University of Wisconsin–Milwaukee. While in college, he interned for U.S. Senator Tom Harkin (D–Iowa) in Washington, D.C. He was also chairman of the UWM College Democrats and co-president of UWM's Campus Organization for Israel. He graduated with his bachelor's degree in political science in 2011.

== Political career ==
After graduating from college, Brostoff worked as a legislative aide to Milwaukee County Supervisor Jason Haas, then served as district director for state senator Chris Larson (D–Milwaukee).

In the Fall of 2013, Brostoff's state representative, Jon Richards, announced he would forgo re-election to seek the Democratic nomination for Attorney General of Wisconsin. Brostoff decided to run for the open seat in the 19th Assembly district. The district comprised all of Milwaukee's lakeshore neighborhoods, including Bay View, the Historic Third Ward, the University of Wisconsin–Milwaukee campus, and Brostoff's home upper east side.

The overwhelmingly Democratic district drew several strong candidates, including Milwaukee County board chair Marina Dimitrijevic, prominent defense attorney Daniel Adams, and labor lawyer Sara Geenen. Adams and Dimitrijevic had prior history as political rivals, and their primary also served as a proxy fight between rival power centers in Milwaukee politics. Dimitrijevic was endorsed by Milwaukee's mayor, Tom Barrett, and Milwaukee's U.S. representative, Gwen Moore. Adams had the endorsement of Milwaukee County executive Chris Abele. From this active primary field, Brostoff prevailed with 35% of the vote. Brostoff's only opponent in the general election was independent United States Pirate Party candidate, Joseph Thomas Klein; Brostoff won with 81% of the vote.

Brostoff was re-elected without opposition in 2016 and 2018, and easily won a fourth term in 2020. He gained notoriety for his outspoken advocacy for disability rights, including for the deaf and hard of hearing. In July 2019, Gov. Tony Evers signed his signature legislation to strengthen sign language interpreter services into law.

In 2022, Brostoff announced his intention to run for a seat on the Milwaukee Common Council rather than running for another term in the Assembly. Brostoff made the announcement after sitting 3rd district city councilmember Nik Kovac stepped down to assume the role of Budget and Management Director for the City of Milwaukee. Brostoff won the special election on November 8, 2022, and was sworn in a week later.

== Personal life and death ==
Jonathan Brostoff was the son of Alan and Phyllis Brostoff. His father is a retired attorney, mediator, and arbitrator; his mother is a social worker and businesswoman in the home health care industry.

Brostoff met his wife, Diana Vang, while attending the University of Wisconsin–Milwaukee. They married and had four children together.

Brostoff was an avid Magic: The Gathering player, consistently placing first on Magic: The Gathering Online during cube leagues. He helped to found and manage CubeCon, an annual convention dedicated to Magic: The Gathering cube.

On November 4, 2024, Brostoff was found dead in Milwaukee County's Greenfield Park. The Milwaukee County Medical Examiner's Office later reported Brostoff's cause of death was by suicide. He was 41.

In the aftermath of his death, his family, Democratic lawmakers, and community groups advocated for stricter rules on firearm sales to support suicide prevention in his memory. An organization also launched a series of 41 mental health trainings across the state, commemorating each year of Brostoff’s life, which mobilized over 1,000 participants.

== Electoral history ==
=== Wisconsin Assembly (2014–2020) ===
Year	Election	Date	Elected				Defeated				Total	Plurality
2014	Primary	Aug. 12	Jonathan Brostoff	Democratic	3,069	35.15%	Marina Dimitrijevic	Dem.	2,819	32.29%	8,730	250
2014	Primary	Aug. 12	Jonathan Brostoff	Democratic	3,069	35.15%	Dan Adams	Dem.	2,023	23.17%	8,730	250
2014	Primary	Aug. 12	Jonathan Brostoff	Democratic	3,069	35.15%	Sara Geenen	Dem.	797	9.13%	8,730	250
2014	General	Nov. 4	Jonathan Brostoff	Democratic	18,077	81.44%	Joseph Thomas Klein	Ind.	3,943	17.76%	22,196	14,134
2016	General	Nov. 8	Jonathan Brostoff (inc)	Democratic	26,732	97.54%	--unopposed--				27,406	
2018	General	Nov. 6	Jonathan Brostoff (inc)	Democratic	27,543	97.50%	--unopposed--				28,249	
2020	General	Nov. 3	Jonathan Brostoff (inc)	Democratic	27,552	78.41%	Helmut Fritz	Rep.	7,535	21.44%	35,139	20,017

Wisconsin State Assembly
Preceded by Jon Richards	Member of the Wisconsin State Assembly from the 19th district January 3, 2015 – November 15, 2022	Succeeded by Ryan Clancy
