= Jon Richards =

American politician

The Honorable Jon Richards
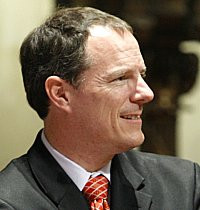

Wisconsin Circuit Court Judge for the Milwaukee Circuit, Branch 30
- Incumbent
- Assumed office September 22, 2020
- Appointed by: Tony Evers
- Preceded by: Jeffrey A. Conen

Member of the Wisconsin State Assembly from the 19th district
- In office January 5, 1999 – January 3, 2015
- Preceded by: Barbara Notestein
- Succeeded by: Jonathan Brostoff

Personal details
- Born: September 5, 1963 (age 63) Waukesha, Wisconsin, U.S.
- Party: Democratic
- Spouse: Andrea Rowe Richards
- Education: Lawrence University, University of Wisconsin–Madison
- Profession: Attorney

Jonathan David Richards (born September 5, 1963) is an American attorney, judge, and Democratic politician. He currently serves as a Wisconsin circuit court judge in Milwaukee County, since his appointment on September 22, 2020, by Governor Tony Evers. He previously represented Milwaukee for 16 years in the Wisconsin State Assembly and was a candidate for Attorney General of Wisconsin in 2014.

== Early life and education ==
Born in Waukesha, Wisconsin, Richards graduated from Waukesha North High School. He received his bachelor's degree from Lawrence University and went on to earn his J.D. from University of Wisconsin Law School. He also attended Keio University in Tokyo, Japan. Richards taught English in Japan and volunteered with Mother Teresa in Calcutta, India.

== Career ==
Richards has been an attorney for more than 25 years. In 1998 he was elected to the Wisconsin State Assembly representing the 19th District for eight terms. He served as Assistant Minority Leader from 2003 to 2007. He also served on the Joint Finance Committee and chaired the Public Health Committee.

In October 2013, Richards announced he would run for Attorney General of Wisconsin rather than running for a ninth term in the Assembly. He came in second in the Democratic primary election of August 2014, with 90,101 votes (33%) to 144,369 (52%) for Susan Happ, who went on to lose the general election in November.

Following the end of his term in the Assembly, Richards joined the Milwaukee law firm Ziino, Germanotta, Knoll & Christensen. He also worked as a volunteer attorney with the Eviction Defense Project as well as for victims of human trafficking through Lotus Legal Clinic, and was director of the Take Back My Meds coalition—which encourages the safe disposal of unused medicines to prevent drug abuse and lake contamination.

On September 22, 2020, Governor Tony Evers announced he had appointed Richards to the Wisconsin Circuit Court seat recently vacated by the resignation of Judge Jeffrey Conen. Judge Richards announced he would seek election to a full term on the court in the 2021 spring election.

== Electoral history ==
=== Wisconsin Assembly (1998–2012) ===
Year	Election	Date	Elected				Defeated				Total	Plurality
1998	Primary	Sep. 8	Jon Richards	Democratic	1,921	65.18%	Jim Carpenter	Dem.	534	18.12%	2,947	1,387
1998	Primary	Sep. 8	Jon Richards	Democratic	1,921	65.18%	Al Campos	Dem.	492	16.69%	2,947	1,387
1998	General	Nov. 3	Jon Richards	Democratic	10,672	69.94%	Curtis Lamon	Rep.	3,852	25.25%	15,258	6,820
1998	General	Nov. 3	Jon Richards	Democratic	10,672	69.94%	Stephen Latin-Kasper	Ind.	734	4.81%	15,258	6,820
2000	General	Nov. 7	Jon Richards (inc.)	Democratic	18,722	97.83%	--unopposed--				19,137	18,307
2002	General	Nov. 5	Jon Richards (inc.)	Democratic	12,419	97.90%	--unopposed--				12,685	12,153
2004	General	Nov. 5	Jon Richards (inc.)	Democratic	24,344	98.31%	--unopposed--				24,762	23,926
2006	General	Nov. 7	Jon Richards (inc.)	Democratic	18,638	98.38%	--unopposed--				18,945	18,331
2008	General	Nov. 4	Jon Richards (inc.)	Democratic	25,281	98.52%	--unopposed--				25,660	24,902
2010	General	Nov. 2	Jon Richards (inc.)	Democratic	15,123	68.54%	Krista Burns	Rep.	15,123	68.54%	22,064	8,231
2012	General	Nov. 6	Jon Richards (inc.)	Democratic	24,856	97.65%	--unopposed--				25,453	24,259

=== Wisconsin Attorney General (2014) ===
Wisconsin Attorney General Election, 2014
Party	Candidate	Votes	%	±%
Democratic Primary, August 12, 2014
Democratic	Susan V. Happ	144,727	52.04%	
Democratic	Jon Richards	90,215	32.44%	
Democratic	Ismael Ozanne	42,627	15.33%	
	Scattering	564	0.20%	
Plurality		54,512	19.60%	
Total votes		278,133	100.0%	

=== Wisconsin Circuit Court (2021) ===
Wisconsin Circuit Court, Milwaukee Circuit, Branch 30 Election, 2021
Party	Candidate	Votes	%	±%
General Election, April 6, 2021
Nonpartisan	Jon Richards (incumbent)	62,942	99.11%	
	Scattering	567	0.89%	
Total votes		63,509	100.0%	

Wisconsin State Assembly
Preceded by Barbara Notestein	Member of the Wisconsin State Assembly from the 19th district January 5, 1999 – January 3, 2015	Succeeded by Jonathan Brostoff
Legal offices
Preceded by Jeffrey A. Conen	Wisconsin Circuit Court Judge for the Milwaukee Circuit, Branch 30; September 22, 2020 – present	Incumbent
