= Nik Kovac =

American politician

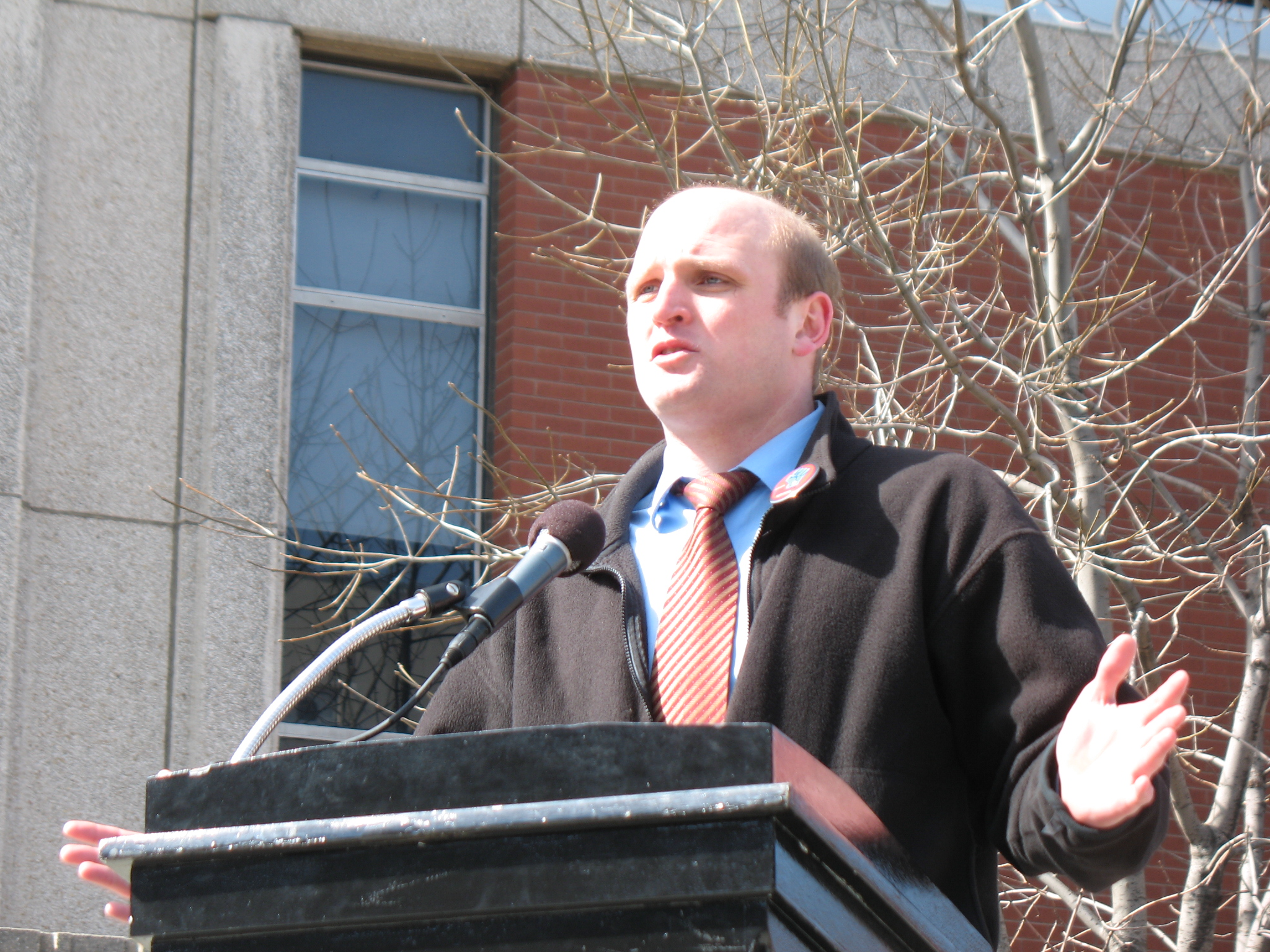
- Kovac speaking at a solidarity protest at UW–Milwaukee, as part of the 2011 Wisconsin protests

Budget Director of Milwaukee
- Incumbent
- Assumed office 2022
- Mayor: Cavalier Johnson
- Preceded by: Dennis Yaccarino

Member of the Milwaukee Common Council from the 3rd ward
- In office April 15, 2008 – May 9, 2022
- Preceded by: Michael D'Amato
- Succeeded by: Jonathan Brostoff

Personal details
- Spouse: Grace Fuhr
- Children: 1
- Education: Harvard University (BS)

Nik Kovac is an American politician and journalist who since 2022 has served as the budget director for the city of Milwaukee. He previously served as an alderman (city councilor) on the Milwaukee Common Council from 2008 until 2022.

== Early life, education, and career ==
Kovac was born and raised in Milwaukee's East Side neighborhood. He received his entire primary school education in Milwaukee Public Schools. Kovac attended McDowell Montessori School, Golda Meir Elementary School, Jackie Robinson Middle School, and graduated from Riverside High School in 1995 as valedictorian. While in high school, he was able to earn early college credits from the University of Wisconsin–Milwaukee. He was also a member of his high school's debate team. Kovac graduated cum laude from Harvard University in 2000 with a Bachelor of Science in mathematics.

== Career in print journalism and talk radio ==
Kovacs worked as a journalist. He began as a beat reporter and later editor in New York City for The Brooklyn Star, before moving to Milwaukee and working for Riverwest Currents and The Shepherd Express. His journalism saw him cover stories on the municipal politics and neighborhood matters.

Kovac hosted Packerverse, a multi-hour weekly radio program broadcast by Riverwest Radio. The program centrally focused on in-depth analysis of the Green Bay Packers, but regularly featured tangential discussion about a variety of other subjects such as history and philosophy.

== Milwaukee Common Council (2008–22) ==
For fourteen years, Kovac was a member of the Milwaukee Common Council. He held the third district seat, representing Riverwest, East Side, and a northern section of Downtown Milwaukee.

Kovac was first elected in 2008, winning a narrow election to the seat held by retiring incumbent Michael D'Amato. Kovac and his friend Sura Faraj (chair of the Riverwest Neighborhood Association) had originally been collaboratively challenging D'Amato (a third-term incumbent) in the ward's primary election in hopes that one of them would unseat him in the general election. However, D'Amato announced in November 2007 that he would forgo re-election. In the election that followed, Kovac and Faraj both faced six additional contenders in the nonpartisan primary election. Kovac placed second in the primary, advancing to the general election; while Faraj placed fourth, failing to advance. In the general election, Kovac narrowly defeated Patrick Flaherty. He took office on April 15, 2008. In each of his three subsequent re-elections, Kovac won upwards of 70% of the vote.

During a portion of his tenure, he was chair of the Finance & Personnel Committee until 2016. He served on the Zoning, Neighborhoods and Development Committee and the Public Works Committee between 2016 and 2020.

In 2021, Kovac served as the Common Council's representative to a sixteen-member task force charged with studying possible solutions to address an anticipated impending municipal fiscal crisis resulting from expected budget shortfalls induced by its structuring of pension obligations to city employees. The committee held five meetings between June and September of that year, and produced twelve possible means of addressing the problem.

On May 9, 2022, Kovac resigned his council seat in order to take office as Milwaukee Budget director. His resignation triggered a special election to fill his former seat.

== Milwaukee Budget Director (2022–present) ==
Kovac endorsed then-acting mayor Cavalier Johnson in Milwaukee's 2022 mayoral special election. Shortly after winning Milwaukee's mayoral election in April 2022, Johnson announced that he would appoint Kovac to serve as the city's budget director, succeeding Dennis Yaccarino in the role. The appointment required confirmation by the Common Council. The position heads the city's budget division, a sub-division under the city's Department of Administration that (at the time Kovac was appointed) employs eight staff members. The position is a cabinet-level position of the city government, responsible for drafting the city's annual budget, managing the implementation of ratified budgets, and addressing other fiscal concerns. His appointment poised him to be central in the city's addressing of its impending fiscal crisis (related to pension obligation-induced budget shortfalls). On May 9, 2022, his appointment as budget director approved unanimously by an 11-0 vote of the Common Council.

== Personal life ==
Nik Kovac is married to Grace Fuhr, with whom he has a daughter. He hosted a weekly program called PackerVerse on Riverwest Radio. As of 2022 Kovac resided in the Riverwest neighborhood of Milwaukee with his wife and daughter.

== Electoral history ==
2008 Milwaukee 3rd district aldermanic election
Candidate	Votes	%
Nonpartisan primary (February 19, 2008)
Patrick Flaherty	4,167	31.77
Nik Kovac	3,406	25.97
Sally McGovern-Rowen	2,091	15.94
Sura Faraj	1,596	12.17
John A. Connelly	562	4.28
Daniel Fouliard	415	3.16
Matt Nelson	379	2.89
David Schroeder	303	2.31
Write-in	197	1.50
Total votes	13,116	100
General election (April 1, 2008)
Nik Kovac	4,292	50.20
Patrick Flaherty	4,221	49.37
Write-in	37	0.43
Total votes	8,550	100

2012 Milwaukee 3rd district aldermanic election
Candidate	Votes	%
General election (April 12, 2012)
Nik Kovac	3,860	97.40
Write-in	103	2.60
Total votes	3,963	100

2016 Milwaukee 3rd district aldermanic election
Candidate	Votes	%
Primary election (February 16, 2016)
Nik Kovac	4,489	76.77
Shannan Hayden	976	16.69
Ira B. Robins	344	5.88
Write-in	38	0.65
Total votes	5,847	100
General election (April 5, 2016)
Nik Kovac	10,047	73.43
Shannan Hayden	3,550	25.95
Write-in	85	0.62
Total votes	5,847	100

2012 Milwaukee 3rd district aldermanic election
Candidate	Votes	%
General election (April 7, 2020)
Nik Kovac	7,513	72.57
Jacob Marek	2,806	27.10
Write-in	34	0.33
Total votes	10,353	100
