= Wisconsin's 9th Assembly district =

American legislative district in Milwaukee County, Wisconsin

Wisconsin's 9th State Assembly district
- 2024 map defined in 2023 Wisc. Act 94; 2022 map defined in Johnson v. Wisconsin Elections Commission; 2011 map was defined in 2011 Wisc. Act 43
Assemblymember
Priscilla Prado; D–Milwaukee
since January 6, 2025 (1 year, 287 days)
- Demographics: 30.98% White; 9.59% Black; 52.96% Hispanic; 6.04% Asian; 4.21% Native American; 0.17% Hawaiian/Pacific Islander
- Population (2020) • Voting age: 59,571; 42,238
- Website: Official website
- Notes: Central Milwaukee County

The 9th Assembly district of Wisconsin is one of 99 districts in the Wisconsin State Assembly. Located in southeast Wisconsin, the district is entirely contained within Milwaukee County. It comprises the village of West Milwaukee and part of the south side of the city of Milwaukee, including the Layton Park neighborhood and Southgate. The district also contains the Mitchell Park Domes, historic Forest Home Cemetery, Aurora St. Luke's Medical Center, Jackson Park, and the Potawatomi Hotel & Casino. The district is represented by Democrat Priscilla Prado, since January 2025.

The 9th Assembly district is located within Wisconsin's 3rd Senate district, along with the 7th and 8th Assembly districts.

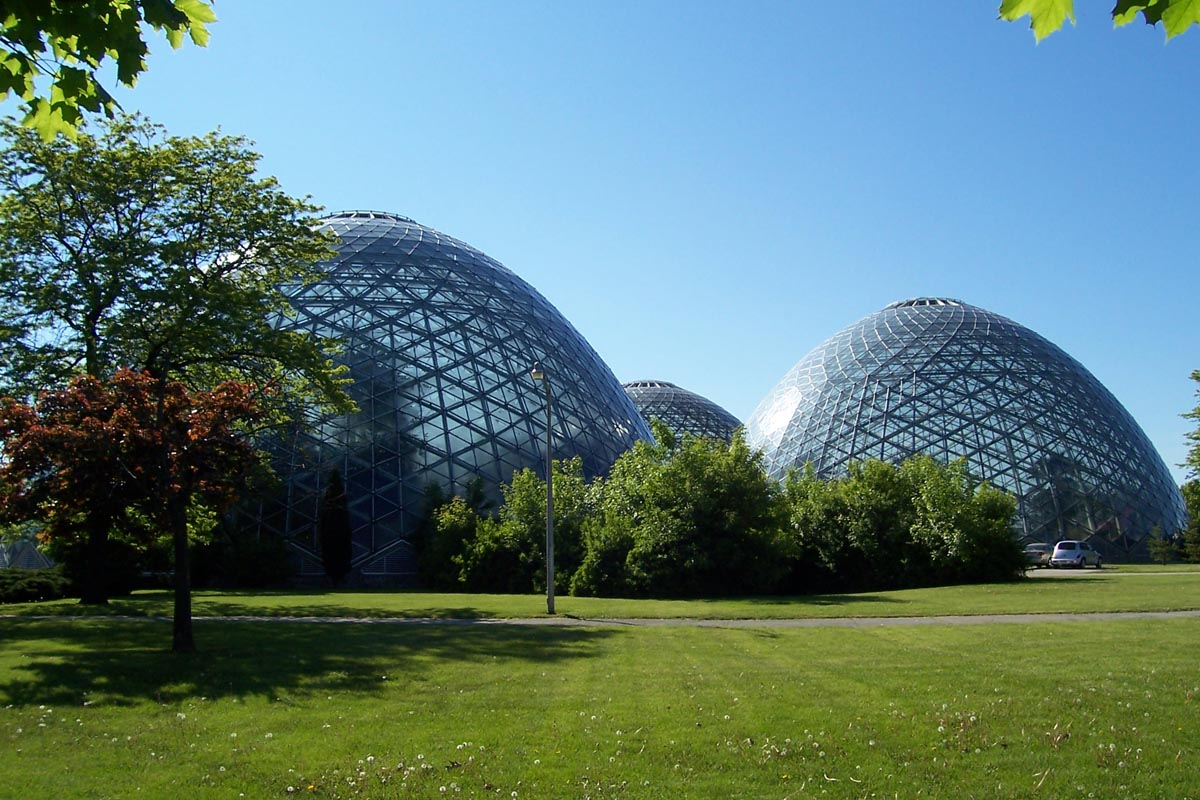
Mitchell Park Horticultural Conservatory

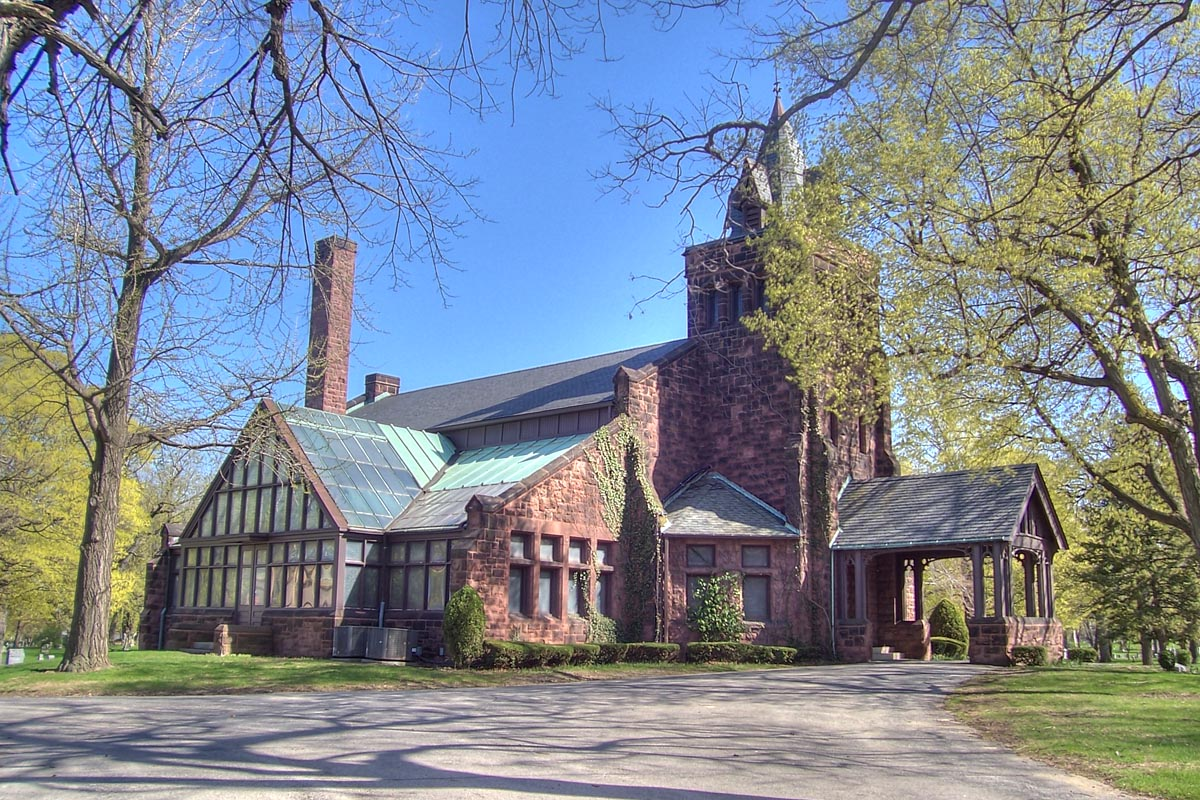
Landmark chapel in Forest Home Cemetery

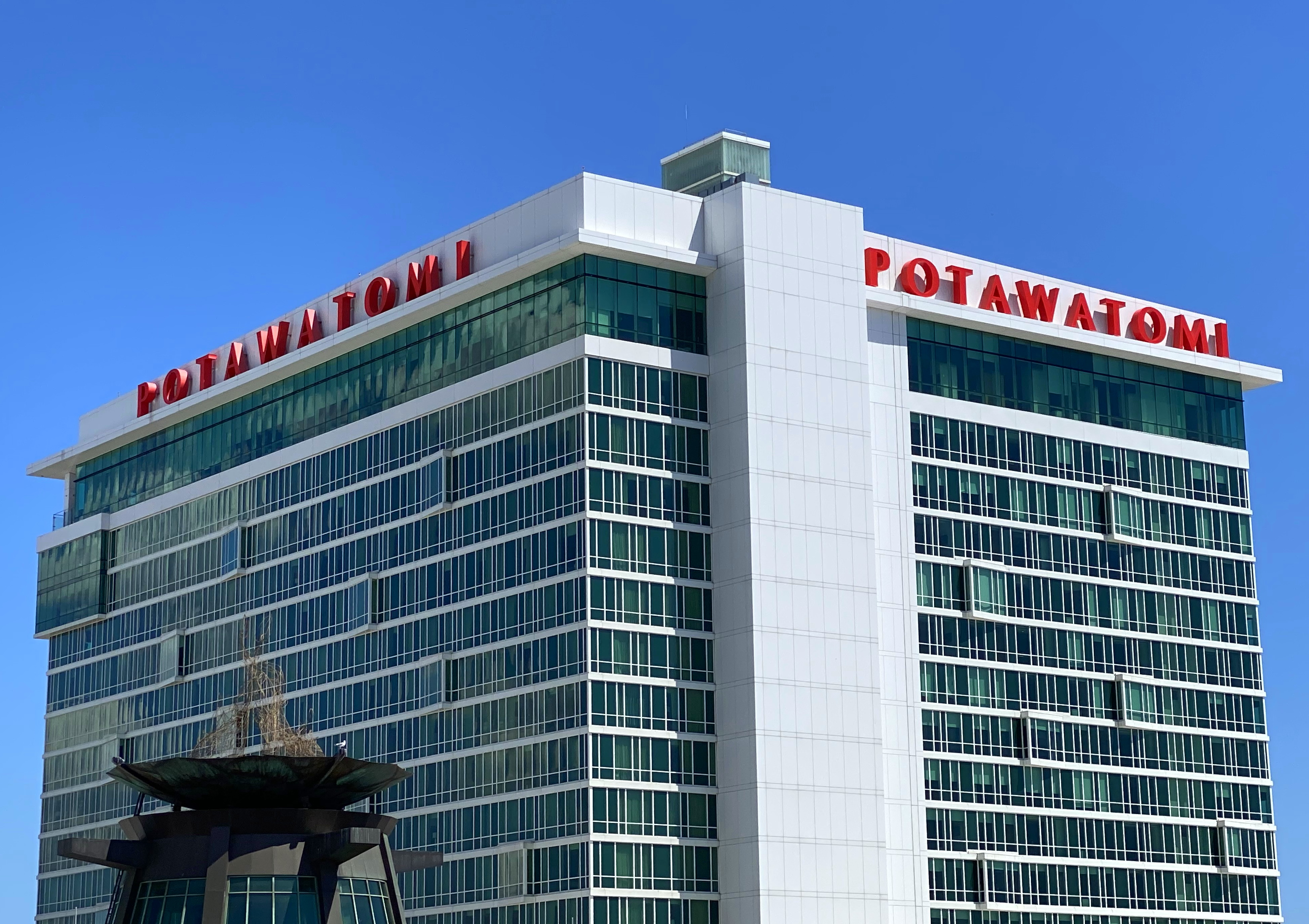
Potawatomi Hotel & Casino

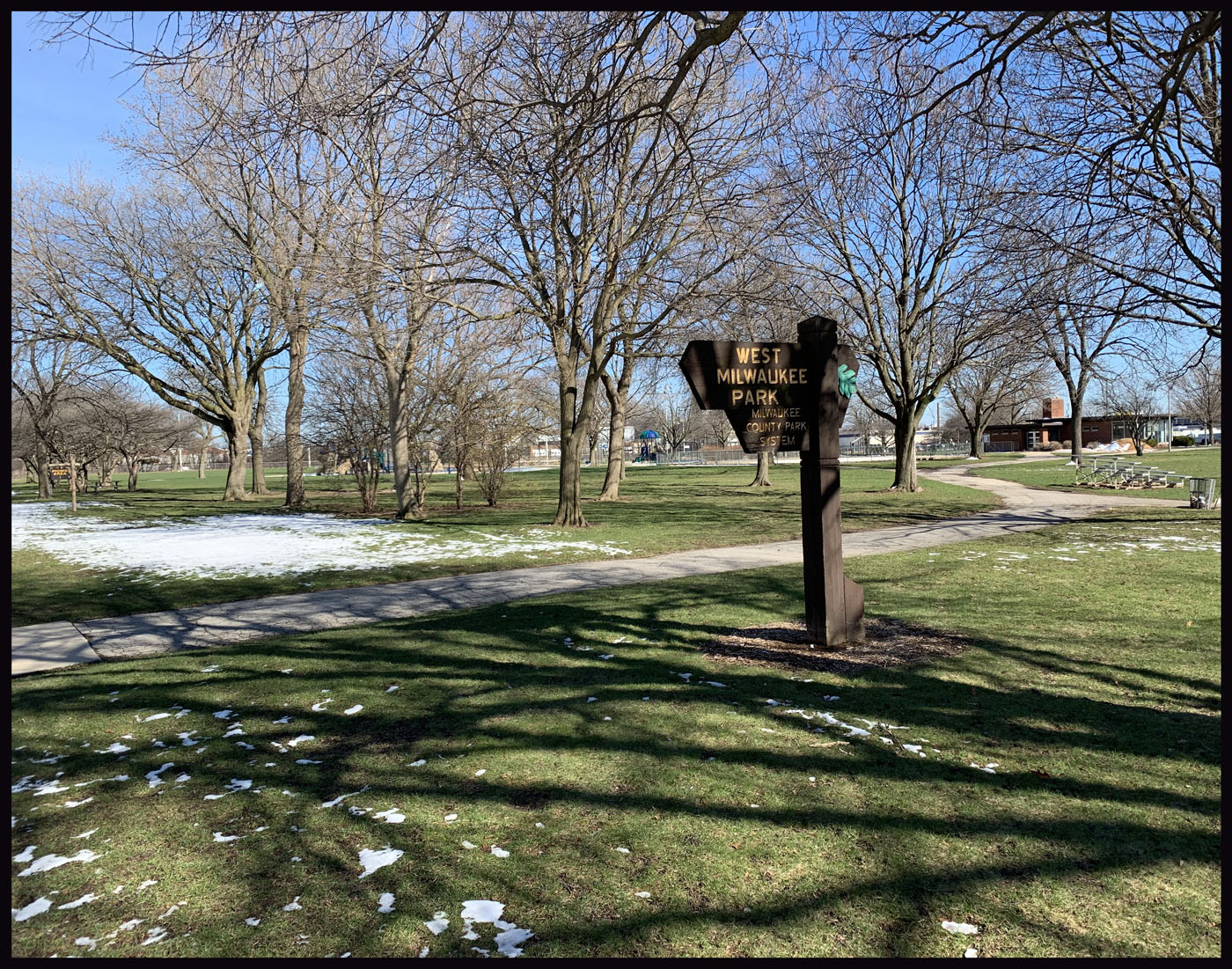
West Milwaukee Park

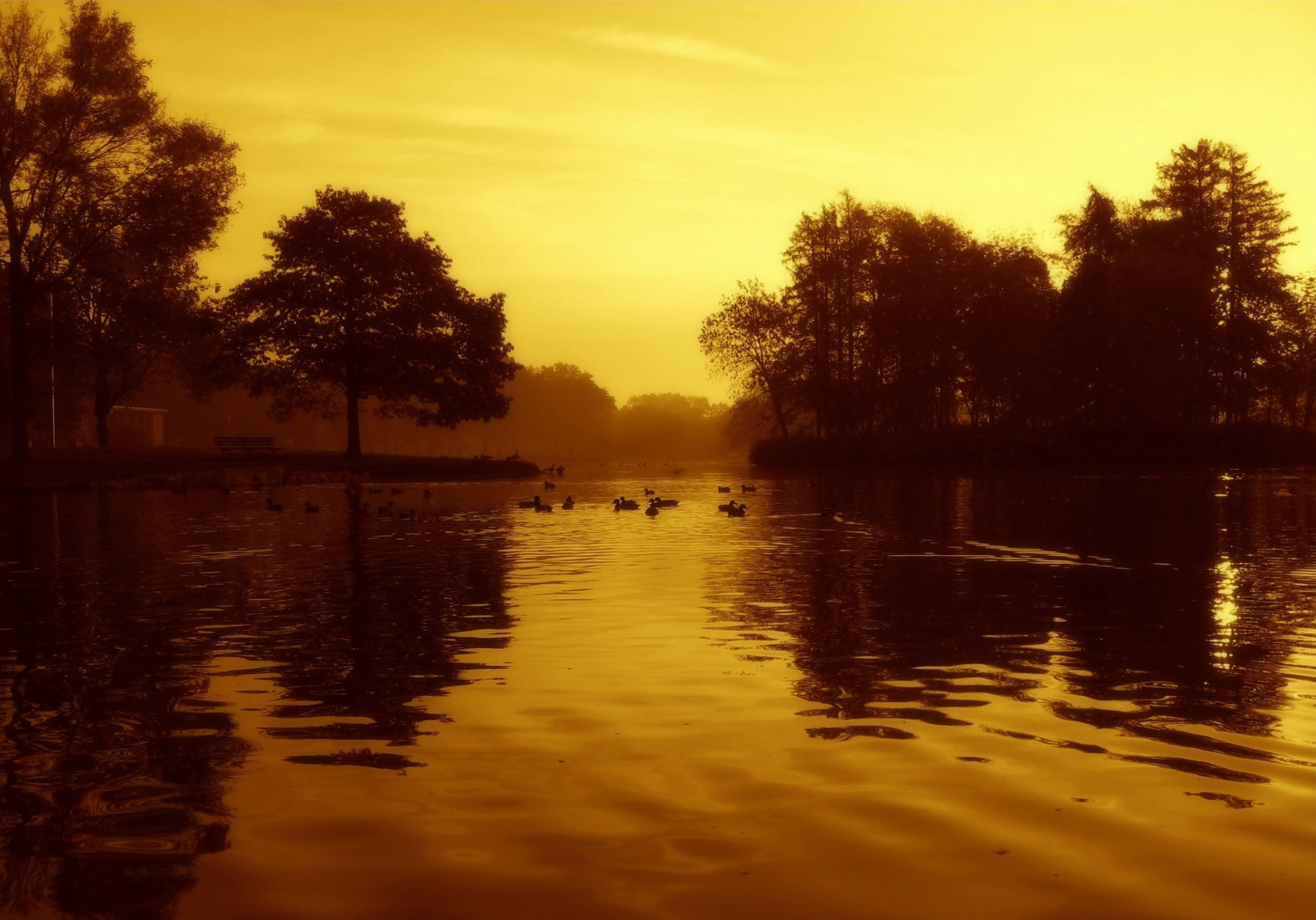
Jackson Park

== List of past representatives ==
List of representatives to the Wisconsin State Assembly from the 9th district
Member	Party	Residence	Counties represented	Term start	Term end	Ref.
District created
Jerry Kleczka	Democratic	Milwaukee	Milwaukee County	January 1, 1973	January 6, 1975	
Phillip James Tuczynski	Democratic	Milwaukee	Milwaukee County	January 6, 1975	January 3, 1983	
Thomas W. Meaux	Democratic	Milwaukee	Milwaukee County	January 3, 1983	November 30, 1985	
--Vacant--			Milwaukee County	November 30, 1985	April 5, 1984	
Tom Barrett	Democratic	Milwaukee	Milwaukee County	April 5, 1984	January 3, 1985	
Walter Kunicki	Democratic	Milwaukee	Milwaukee County	January 3, 1985	January 4, 1993	
Tim Carpenter	Democratic	Milwaukee	Milwaukee County	January 4, 1993	January 1, 2003	
Josh Zepnick	Democratic	Milwaukee	Milwaukee County	January 1, 2003	January 1, 2019	
Marisabel Cabrera	Democratic	Milwaukee	Milwaukee County	January 1, 2019	July 31, 2024	
--Vacant--			Milwaukee County	July 31, 2024	January 6, 2025	
Priscilla Prado	Democratic	Milwaukee	Milwaukee County	January 6, 2025	Current	
