= Steven Olikara =

American political commentator, civic engagement advocate

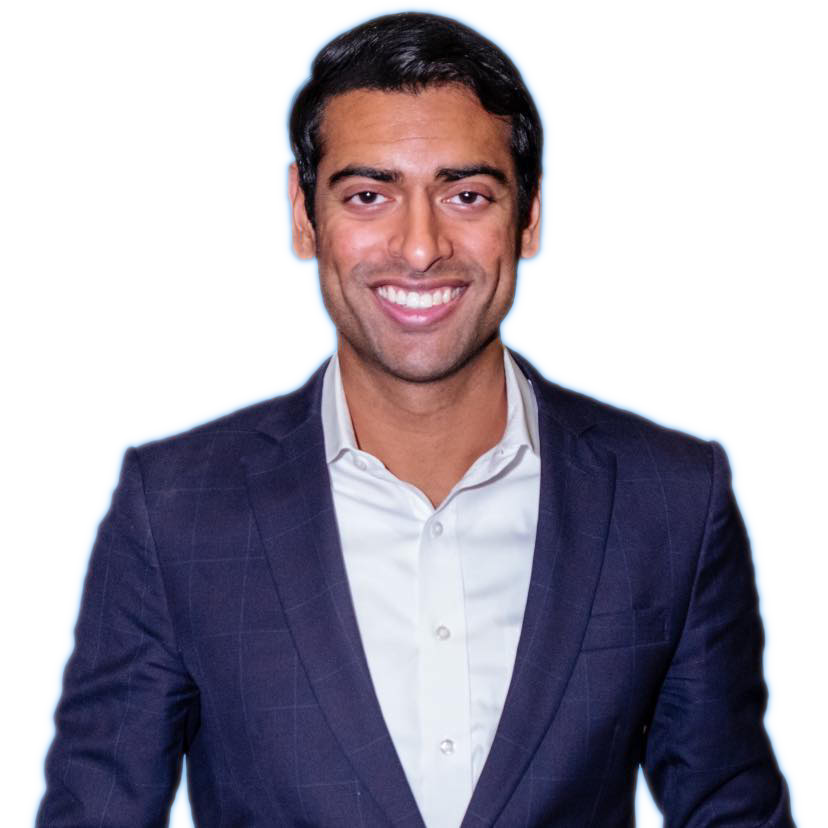
- Citizenship: American
- Education: University of Wisconsin–Madison
- Occupations: Political commentator, Civic engagement advocate
- Known for: Candidate for U.S. Senate in Wisconsin
- Website: stevenolikara.com

Steven Olikara is an American political commentator, civic engagement advocate, and former political candidate. He is known for his involvement in civic engagement initiatives and for his candidacy in the 2022 Democratic primary election for the United States Senate in Wisconsin.

== Early life and education ==
Olikara grew up in the Milwaukee area of Wisconsin and attended Brookfield East High School. He later attended the University of Wisconsin–Madison, where he studied political science and environmental studies. While at the university, he participated in student leadership activities and was selected as a student speaker during a presidential event featuring Barack Obama.

== Career ==
Olikara became associated with national civic engagement efforts focused on encouraging cooperation among younger elected officials from different political parties. These efforts coincided with the development and expansion of cross-partisan caucuses and networks of younger lawmakers in Congress and state legislatures.

In August 2021, Olikara announced his candidacy for the Democratic nomination for the United States Senate seat in Wisconsin. During the campaign, he advocated political reform proposals including campaign finance changes and electoral reforms. He participated in debates and interviews with Wisconsin media outlets throughout the election cycle.

Olikara was unsuccessful in the Democratic primary election, which was won by Mandela Barnes.

In 2023, Olikara joined Bridge Entertainment Labs, an organization that examines the role of entertainment and storytelling in addressing political and social division. The organization's work was later discussed by the Chronicle of Philanthropy in coverage of efforts to address political polarization through media and entertainment.

Olikara also became affiliated with the USC Schwarzenegger Institute for State and Global Policy as a Senior Fellow for Political Transformation.

== Media and public commentary ==
Olikara contributes regularly on CNN, CBS News, and other national news outlets. He has appeared as a commentator on political and public affairs issues in national media outlets. He appeared in the 2021 documentary film The Reunited States, which examines efforts to reduce political polarization in the United States.
