= Wisconsin's 19th Assembly district =

American legislative district in Milwaukee, Wisconsin

Wisconsin's 19th State Assembly district
- 2024 map defined in 2023 Wisc. Act 94; 2022 map defined in Johnson v. Wisconsin Elections Commission; 2011 map was defined in 2011 Wisc. Act 43
Assemblymember
Ryan Clancy; D–Milwaukee
since January 3, 2023 (3 years)
- Demographics: 78.38% White; 7.19% Black; 6.67% Hispanic; 5.52% Asian; 1.4% Native American; 0.18% Hawaiian/Pacific Islander
- Population (2020) • Voting age: 59,320; 55,412
- Website: Official website
- Notes: Downtown Milwaukee

The 19th Assembly district of Wisconsin is one of 99 districts in the Wisconsin State Assembly. Located in southeastern Wisconsin, the district is entirely contained within the city of Milwaukee, in Milwaukee County, covering downtown and much of Milwaukee's Lake Michigan coastline. It contains much of Downtown Milwaukee, including Milwaukee City Hall, along with the Historic Third Ward, University of Wisconsin–Milwaukee campus, the Milwaukee Art Museum (Quadracci Pavilion), the Port of Milwaukee, and the Henry Maier Festival Park, site of Milwaukee's annual Summerfest. The district has been represented by Ryan Clancy of the Democratic Party since January 2023.

The 19th Assembly district is located within Wisconsin's 7th Senate district, along with the 20th and 21st Assembly districts.

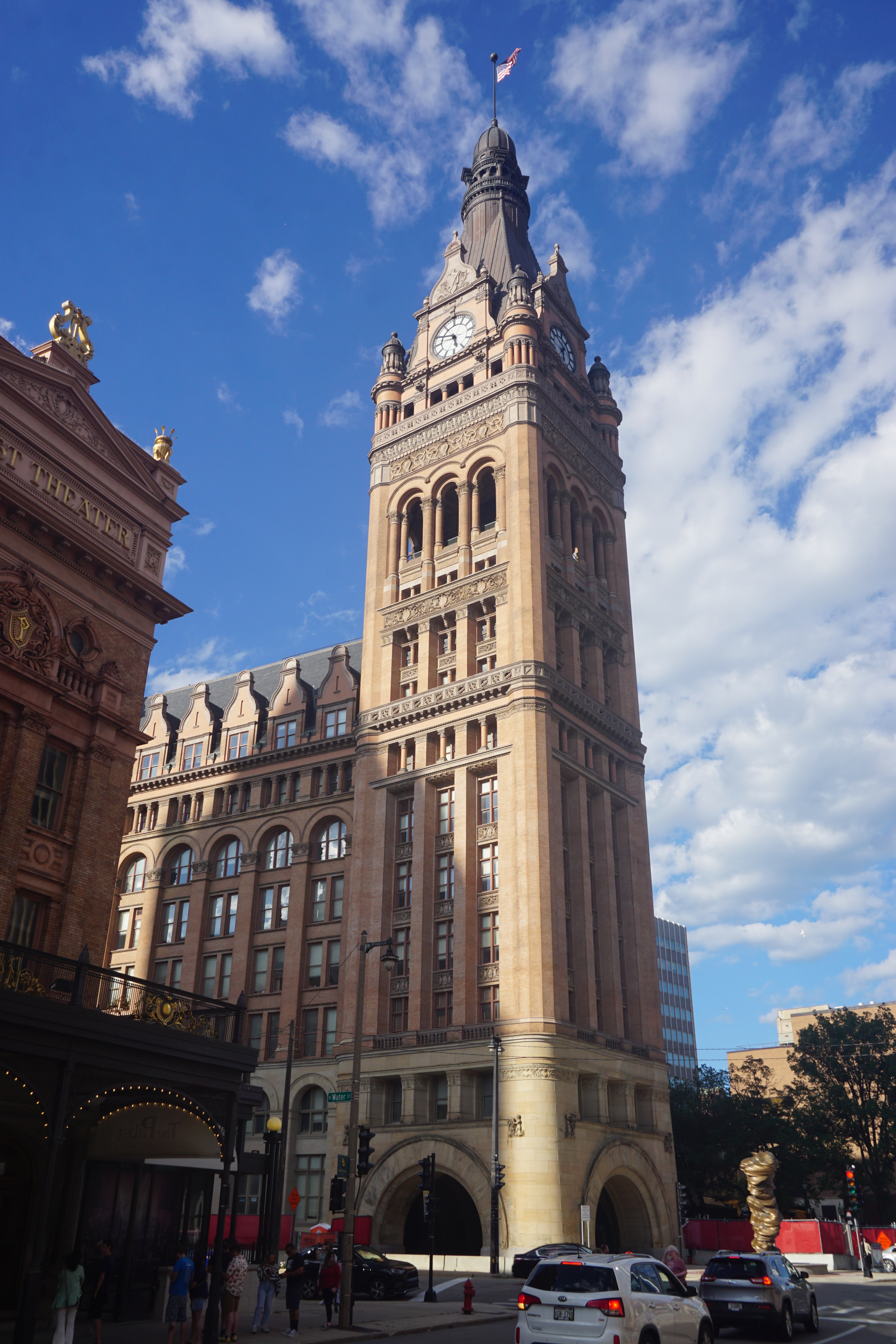
Milwaukee City Hall

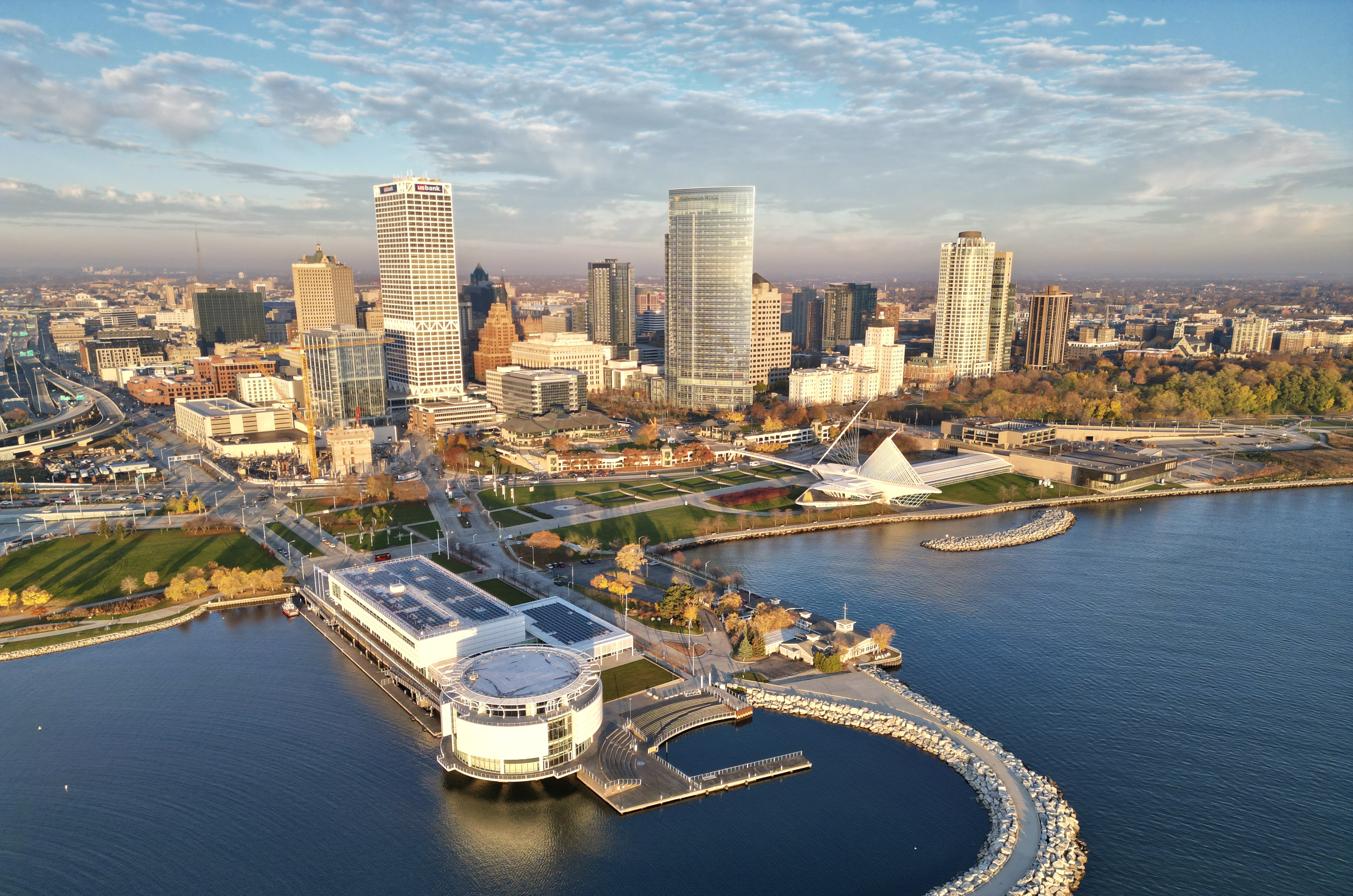
Downtown Milwaukee

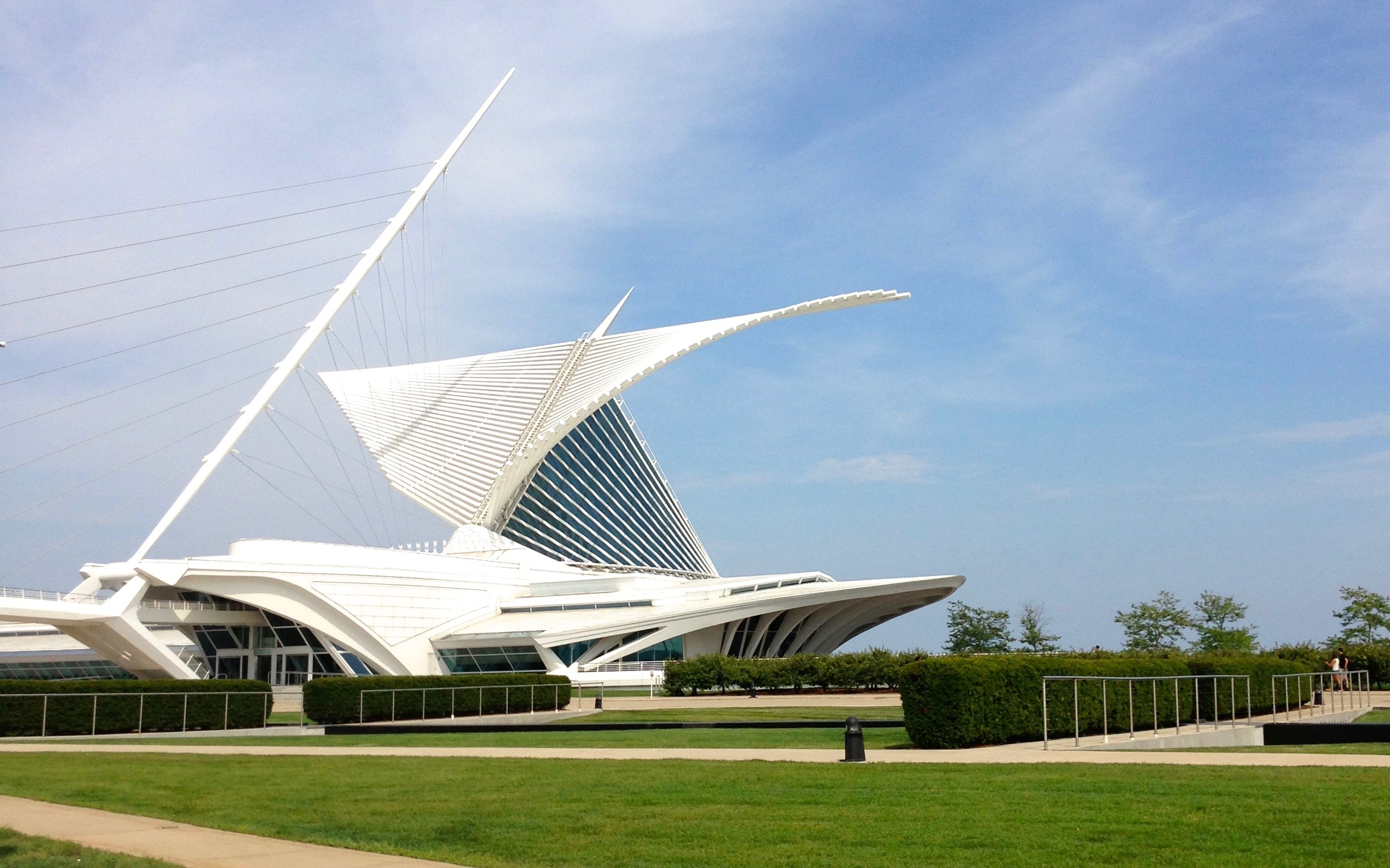
Milwaukee Art Museum

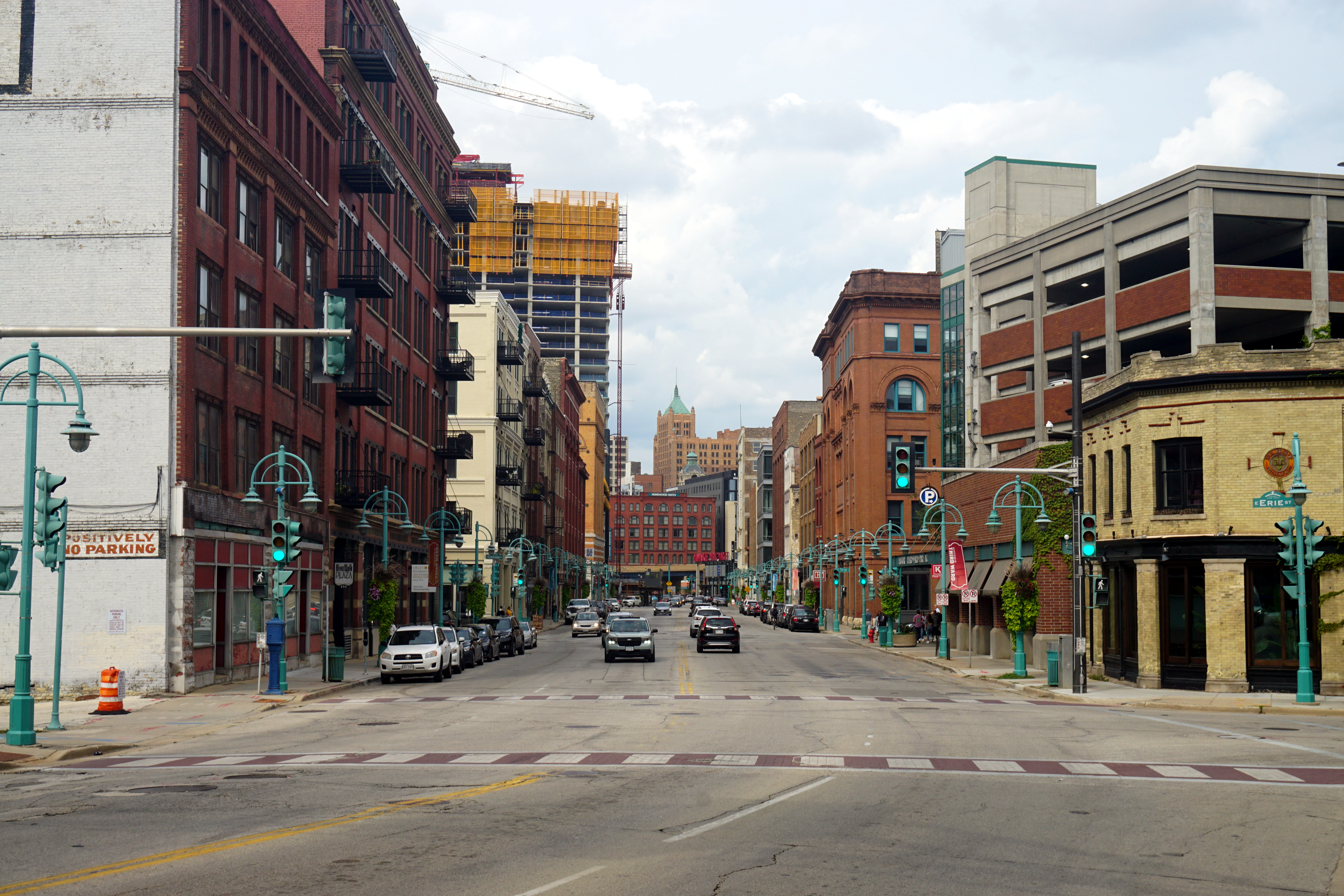
Historic Third Ward

== List of past representatives ==
List of representatives to the Wisconsin State Assembly from the 19th district
Member	Party	Residence	Counties represented	Term start	Term end	Ref.
District created
Louise M. Tesmer	Dem.	Milwaukee	Milwaukee	January 1, 1973	January 3, 1983	
Jeffrey A. Neubauer	Dem.	Racine	Racine	January 3, 1983	January 7, 1985	
Louise M. Tesmer	Dem.	Milwaukee	Milwaukee	January 7, 1985	July 31, 1989	
--Vacant--			Milwaukee	July 31, 1989	October 26, 1989	
Rosemary Potter	Dem.	Milwaukee	Milwaukee	October 26, 1989	January 4, 1993	
Barbara Notestein	Dem.	Milwaukee	Milwaukee	January 4, 1993	January 5, 1999	
Jon Richards	Dem.	Milwaukee	Milwaukee	January 5, 1999	January 3, 2015	
Jonathan Brostoff	Dem.	Milwaukee	Milwaukee	January 3, 2015	November 15, 2022	
--Vacant--			Milwaukee	November 15, 2022	January 3, 2023	
Ryan Clancy	Dem.	Milwaukee	Milwaukee	January 3, 2023	Current	
