= Marisabel Cabrera =

21st century American politician (born 1975)

Wisconsin Circuit Judge for the Milwaukee Circuit, Branch 43
- Incumbent
- Assumed office August 1, 2024
- Preceded by: Marshall B. Murray

Member of the Wisconsin State Assembly from the 9th district
- In office January 7, 2019 – July 31, 2024
- Preceded by: Josh Zepnick
- Succeeded by: Priscilla Prado

Personal details
- Born: December 12, 1975 (age 50) Milwaukee, Wisconsin, U.S.
- Party: Democratic
- Education: University of Wisconsin–Madison (B.A.); Michigan State Law (J.D.)
- Profession: Lawyer
- Website: Assembly website

Marisabel Cabrera (born December 12, 1975) is an American lawyer and Democratic politician from Milwaukee, Wisconsin. She is a Wisconsin circuit court judge in Milwaukee County, since August 2024. She previously served three terms in the Wisconsin State Assembly, representing Wisconsin's 9th Assembly district from 2019 to 2024.

== Biography ==
Born and raised in Milwaukee's south side, Cabrera graduated from Nathan Hale High School in 1993. She earned her bachelor's degree from the University of Wisconsin–Madison, in Spanish and Latin American Iberian Studies, and earned her J.D. from Michigan State University College of Law in 2002. She was admitted to the state bars of Wisconsin and Florida, and worked as an immigration attorney in private practice and with the non-profit group Voces de la Frontera ("Voices from the Border"). She is the former chair of the Milwaukee Police and Fire Commission and the Democratic Party of Wisconsin Latino Caucus. For her work with the Latino Caucus, she was recognized by the Democratic Party of Milwaukee County with the 2016 Rising Star Award.

In 2018, she successfully challenged incumbent Assemblymember Josh Zepnick in a Democratic primary election, after losing an earlier attempt in 2016. She was elected without opposition in the 2018 general election. In 2017, Zepnick had been accused of sexually harassing two female colleagues; he had been stripped of his committee assignments and Assembly privileges but refused to resign.

In the Assembly, Cabrera serves on the committees on the Judiciary, International Affairs and Commerce, Small Business Development, Consumer Protection, Constitution and Ethics, and State Affairs.

In October 2023, Cabrera announced that she would run for a Wisconsin circuit court judgeship in Milwaukee County, to succeed the retiring judge Marshall B. Murray. Cabrera narrowly won the election in April 2024, and took office as a judge in August 2024.

== Electoral history ==
=== Wisconsin Assembly (2016–2022) ===
Year	Election	Date	Elected				Defeated				Total	Plurality
2016	Primary	Aug. 9	Josh Zepnick (inc)	Democratic	1,222	52.79%	Marisabel Cabrera	Dem.	1,073	46.35%	2,315	149
2018	Primary	Aug. 14	Marisabel Cabrera	Democratic	1,982	63.48%	Josh Zepnick (inc)	Dem.	1,110	35.55%	3,122	872
2018	General	Nov. 6	Marisabel Cabrera	Democratic	11,453	97.96%	--unopposed--				11,692	11,214
2020	Primary	Aug. 11	Marisabel Cabrera (inc)	Democratic	1,851	62.28%	Christian Saldivar	Dem.	1,118	37.62%	2,972	733
2020	General	Nov. 3	Marisabel Cabrera (inc)	Democratic	11,981	72.77%	Veronica Diaz	Rep.	4,458	27.08%	16,464	7,523
2022	General	Nov. 8	Marisabel Cabrera (inc)	Democratic	8,644	71.99%	Ryan Michael Antczak	Rep.	3,345	27.86%	12,007	5,299

=== Wisconsin circuit judge (2024) ===
Year	Election	Date	Elected				Defeated				Total	Plurality
2024	General	Apr. 2	Marisabel Cabrera	Nonpartisan	61,625	50.99%	Rochelle N. Johnson-Bent	Non.	58,366	48.30%	120,852	3,259

Wisconsin State Assembly
Preceded by Josh Zepnick	Member of the Wisconsin State Assembly from the 9th district January 7, 2019 – July 31, 2024	Succeeded by Priscilla Prado
Legal offices
Preceded by Marshall B. Murray	Wisconsin Circuit Judge for the Milwaukee Circuit, Branch 43; August 1, 2024 – present	Incumbent
