= Ryan Clancy =

American politician (born 1977)

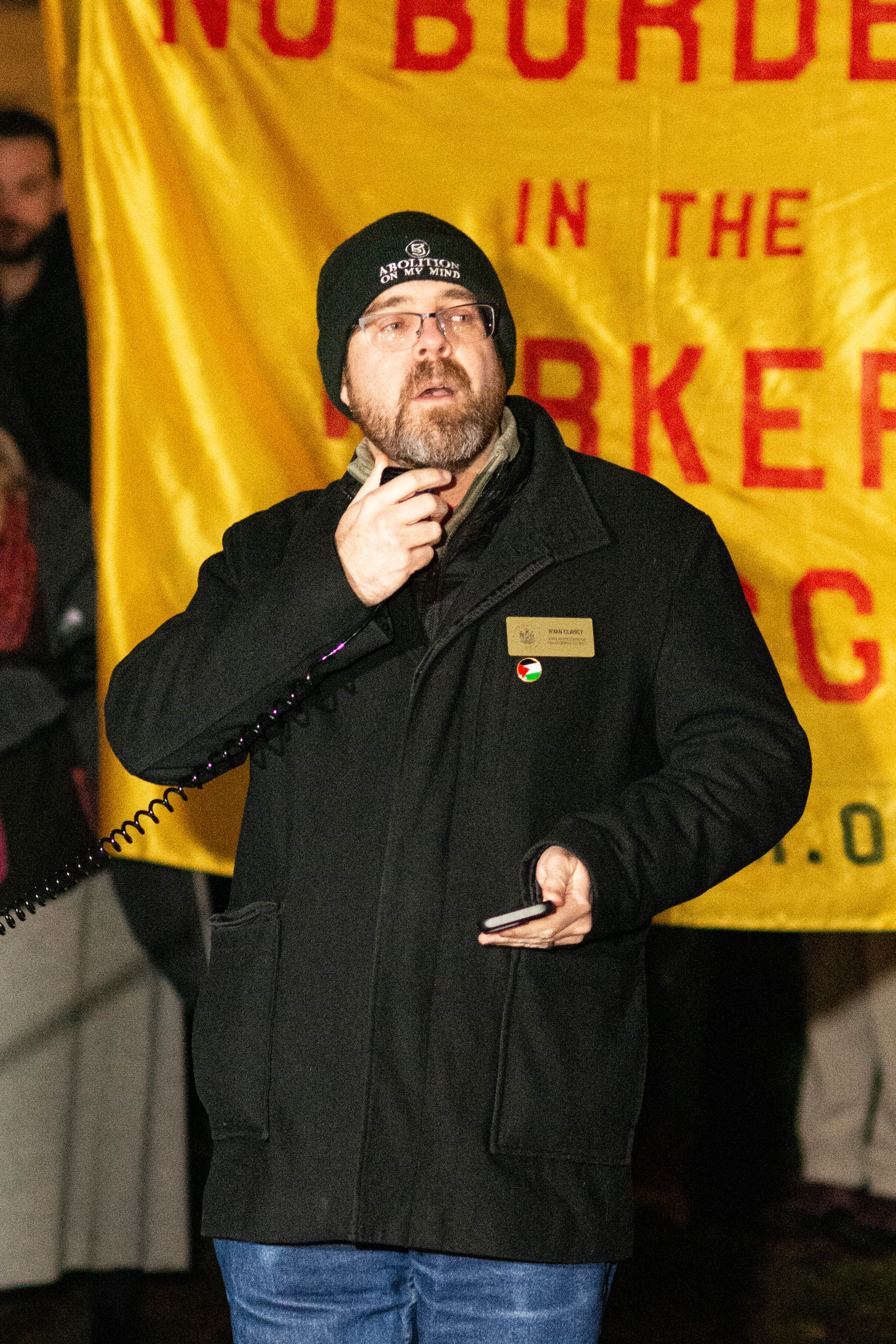
- Clancy in 2026

Member of the Wisconsin State Assembly from the 19th district
- Incumbent
- Assumed office January 3, 2023
- Preceded by: Jonathan Brostoff

Member of the Milwaukee County Board of Supervisors from the 4th district
- In office April 21, 2020 – April 16, 2024
- Preceded by: Marina Dimitrijevic
- Succeeded by: Jack Eckblad

Personal details
- Born: January 9, 1977 (age 49) Glendale, Wisconsin, U.S.
- Party: Democratic
- Other political affiliations: Democratic Socialists of America; Working Families Party
- Spouse: Becky
- Children: 5
- Education: Beloit College (BA); California State University, Dominguez Hills (MA)
- Occupation: Educator, business owner
- Website: Official website Campaign website

Ryan M. Clancy (born January 9, 1977) is an American teacher, business owner, and politician from Milwaukee, Wisconsin. He is a member of the Wisconsin State Assembly, representing Wisconsin's 19th Assembly district since January 2023. He was a member of the Milwaukee County Board of Supervisors from 2020 to 2024. He is a member of the Democratic Party ticket and the Democratic Socialists of America.

== Early life and career ==
Ryan Clancy graduated from Nicolet High School in Glendale, Wisconsin, in 1995.

He earned his bachelor's degree in English from Beloit College, and joined the Peace Corps. He was sent to work as an English teacher in a remote rural area of the Philippines. After his term in the Peace Corps, he returned to Milwaukee County. In 2003, he traveled to Iraq to protest the impending invasion. After returning from Iraq, the federal Office of Foreign Assets Control issued him a $10,000 fine, but he was again defended by the ACLU. He subsequently earned his master's degree from California State University, Dominguez Hills.

During these years, he also taught as a substitute teacher in the Milwaukee Public Schools and became an organizer with the Milwaukee Teachers' Education Association. In 2014, he and his wife started Bounce Milwaukee, a community recreational complex and restaurant. Through this business ownership, he was a founder of the Progressive Restaurant and Activists of Wisconsin Network, which advocates for higher wages and better working conditions in the food service industry.

He continued to volunteer with activist causes through these years, participating in the Dakota Access Pipeline protests in North Dakota and several immigrant rights protests in Racine and Milwaukee, and was active in the Black Lives Matter protests—after which he filed a lawsuit against the city and county of Milwaukee for violating his rights and lost.

== Political career ==
After a vacancy occurred in his county board district, Clancy started a campaign for Milwaukee County board of supervisors in 2020. He narrowly defeated his opponent in the Spring general election, and became the first socialist on the county board since 1956. He was re-elected in 2022.

Shortly after the 2022 Spring election, incumbent state representative Jonathan Brostoff announced he would run for Milwaukee city council rather than seeking re-election to the State Assembly. A few weeks later, Clancy announced his candidacy for the Democratic nomination in the heavily Democratic district, which spans nearly all of Milwaukee's lakefront. No other candidates entered the race, and Clancy was unopposed in the primary and general election. He took office in the Assembly in January 2023.

Since his election to the Wisconsin State Assembly, Clancy has had prominent disputes within the Democratic Party. During the 2024 United States Democratic Presidential Primary Election, he endorsed the Uncommitted National Movement due to his views on Palestine and the ongoing conflict in Gaza. In 2024, a primary challenge was launched against him. Clancy's primary challenger was Milwaukee-based attorney Jarrod Anderson. Anderson received the endorsement Milwaukee Mayor Cavalier Johnson, former State Representative Jonathan Brostoff, along with the support of several other prominent Wisconsin Democrats. The issue of the conflict in Gaza was a prominent focal point for Clancy. Clancy won the primary with 55% of the vote and was unopposed in the general election.

Following President Trump's executive order banning federal funding for any hospital providing gender-affirming care for anyone under 19, Children's Wisconsin Hospital canceled a transgender teenager's appointment to receive hormone therapy. Clancy denounced the hospital's decision saying, "it's disappointing that a beloved institution rushed to obey Trump's cruel, anti-trans, anti-science order." The next day, the hospital reversed their decision and rescheduled the teenager's appointment, which Clancy praised and called "a relief".

During the 2025-2026 legislative session, Clancy voted against AB 677, now 2025 Wisconsin Act 88. Act 88 further defines child grooming as a felony. The vote passed 93-6 with Clancy being joined by 5 other State Representatives. Those joining him were Francesca Hong, Angelito Tenorio, Christian Phelps, Angelina Cruz, and Darrin Madison Jr.

Clancy again drew a primary challenger again in the 2026 Wisconsin State Assembly Elections. He will face former City of Madison Alderperson, Bridget Maniaci. The primary election will take place on August 11, 2026.

== Personal life and family ==
Ryan Clancy lives with his wife Becky and their five children in the Bay View neighborhood of Milwaukee. They were co-owners of the Bounce Milwaukee complex until they were forced to permanently shut down in 2023.

== Electoral history ==
=== Milwaukee county board (2020, 2022) ===
Milwaukee County Board, 4th District Election, 2020
Party	Candidate	Votes	%	±%
Nonpartisan Primary, February 18, 2020 (top two)
Nonpartisan	Andrea Rodriguez	1,866	47.61%	
Nonpartisan	Ryan Clancy	1,603	40.90%	
Nonpartisan	Paul Rasky	420	10.72%	
	Scattering	30	0.77%	
Total votes		3,919	100.0%	
General Election, April 7, 2020
Nonpartisan	Ryan Clancy	2,798	50.30%	
Nonpartisan	Andrea Rodriguez	2,750	49.43%	
	Scattering	15	0.27%	
Plurality		48	0.86%	
Total votes		5,563	100.0%	+117.22%

Milwaukee County Board, 4th District Election, 2022
Party	Candidate	Votes	%	±%
General Election, April 5, 2022
Nonpartisan	Ryan Clancy (incumbent)	8,250	97.81%	
	Scattering	185	2.19%	
Total votes		8,435	100.0%	+51.63%

=== Wisconsin Assembly (2022–present) ===
Year	Election	Date	Elected				Defeated				Total	Plurality
2022	General	Nov. 8	Ryan Clancy	Democratic	24,193	98.26%	--unopposed--				24,622	23,764
2024	Primary	Aug. 27	Ryan Clancy (inc)	Democratic	6,641	54.77%	Jarrod Anderson	Dem.	5,460	45.03%	12,125	1,181
2024	General	Nov. 5	Ryan Clancy (inc)	Democratic	30,112	97.61%	--unopposed--				30,848	29,376
2026	Primary	Aug. 11	Ryan Clancy (inc)	Democratic	8,257	54.31%	Bridget Maniaci	Dem.	6,914	45.47%	15,205	1,343

Wisconsin State Assembly
Preceded by Jonathan Brostoff	Member of the Wisconsin State Assembly from the 19th district January 3, 2023 – present	Incumbent
Political offices
Preceded by Marina Dimitrijevic	Member of the Milwaukee County Board of Supervisors from the 4th district April 2020 – present	Incumbent
