= Milwaukee Common Council =

Legislative branch of the Milwaukee city government

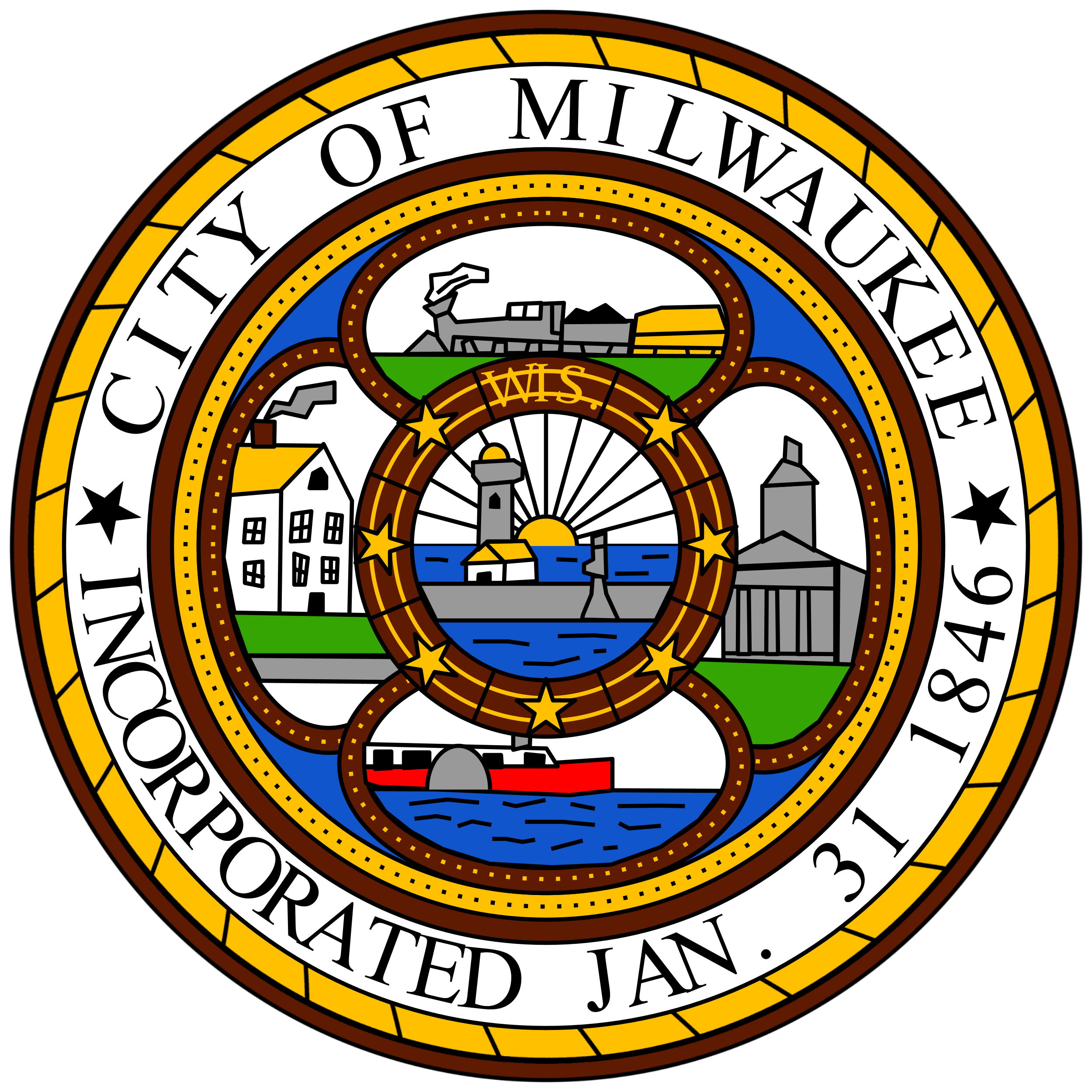

Type
- Type: Unicameral

History
- Founded: January 31, 1846

Leadership
- President: José G. Pérez since April 19, 2022
- Seats: 15

Elections
- Last election: April 2, 2024
- Next election: 2028

Meeting place
- Common Council Chambers; Milwaukee City Hall

Website
- city.milwaukee.gov/CommonCouncil

The Milwaukee Common Council is the legislative branch of the government of the city of Milwaukee in Wisconsin. It consists of 15 alderpersons elected from 15 wards to serve four-year terms. The Council Chambers are located in Milwaukee City Hall.

The presiding officer of the Council is the President, who is elected from the members of the Council following each general election and serves a four-year term.

== History ==
The Common Council was established with the founding of the modern City of Milwaukee on January 31, 1846.

== Composition ==
The most recent general election to the Common Council was the 2024 Milwaukee Common Council election, held on April 2.

Alderperson elections are officially nonpartisan; party affiliations below are informational only.

Current composition of the Milwaukee Common Council
Ward	Name	Start	Party (Note: Aldermanic elections are officially nonpartisan; party affiliations are informational only.)
1	Andrea M. Pratt	April 18, 2023	
2	Mark Chambers, Jr.	November 8, 2022	
3	Alex Brower	November 8, 2022	Democratic Socialists of America
4	Robert Bauman	April 2004	
5	Lamont Westmoreland	April 4, 2023	
6	Milele A. Coggs	2008	
7	DiAndre Jackson	April 2, 2024	
8	JoCasta Zamarripa	2020	
9	Larresa Taylor	April 4, 2023	
10	Sharlen P. Moore	April 2, 2024	
11	Peter Burgelis	April 2, 2024	
12	José G. Pérez	2012	
13	Scott Spiker	2019	
14	Marina Dimitrijevic	April 21, 2020	
15	Russell W. Stamper II	2014	
