= 2012 Milwaukee County Executive election =

- April 3, 2012
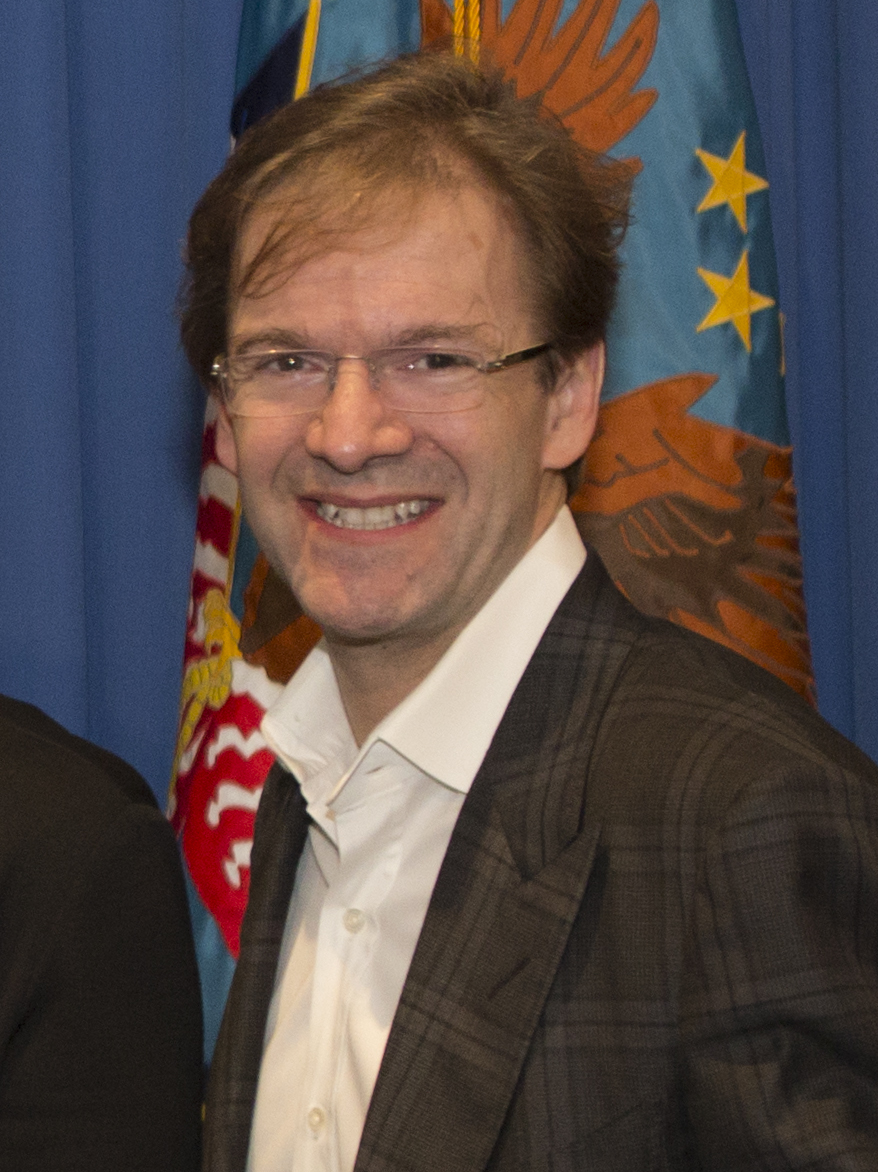
Candidate	Chris Abele
Party	Nonpartisan
Popular vote	93,621
Percentage	95.33%
County Executive before election
Chris Abele
Nonpartisan
Elected County Executive
Chris Abele
Nonpartisan

The 2012 Milwaukee County Executive election took place on April 3, 2012. Incumbent County Executive Chris Abele, who was first elected in a 2011 special election, ran for re-election to a full term. Though State Representative Jeff Stone, who ran against Abele in 2011, and Sheriff David Clarke considered running against Abele, both declined to do so. Abele faced no opponent and was re-elected unopposed.

== General election ==
=== Candidates ===
- Chris Abele, incumbent County Executive

==== Declined ====
- Jeff Stone, State Representative, 2011 candidate for County Executive
- David Clarke, County Sheriff

=== Results ===
2012 Milwaukee County Executive election results
Party	Candidate	Votes	%
Nonpartisan	Chris Abele (inc.)	93,621	95.33%
Write-in		4,583	4.67%
Total votes		98,204	100.00%
