= 2011 Milwaukee County Executive special election =

- April 5, 2011
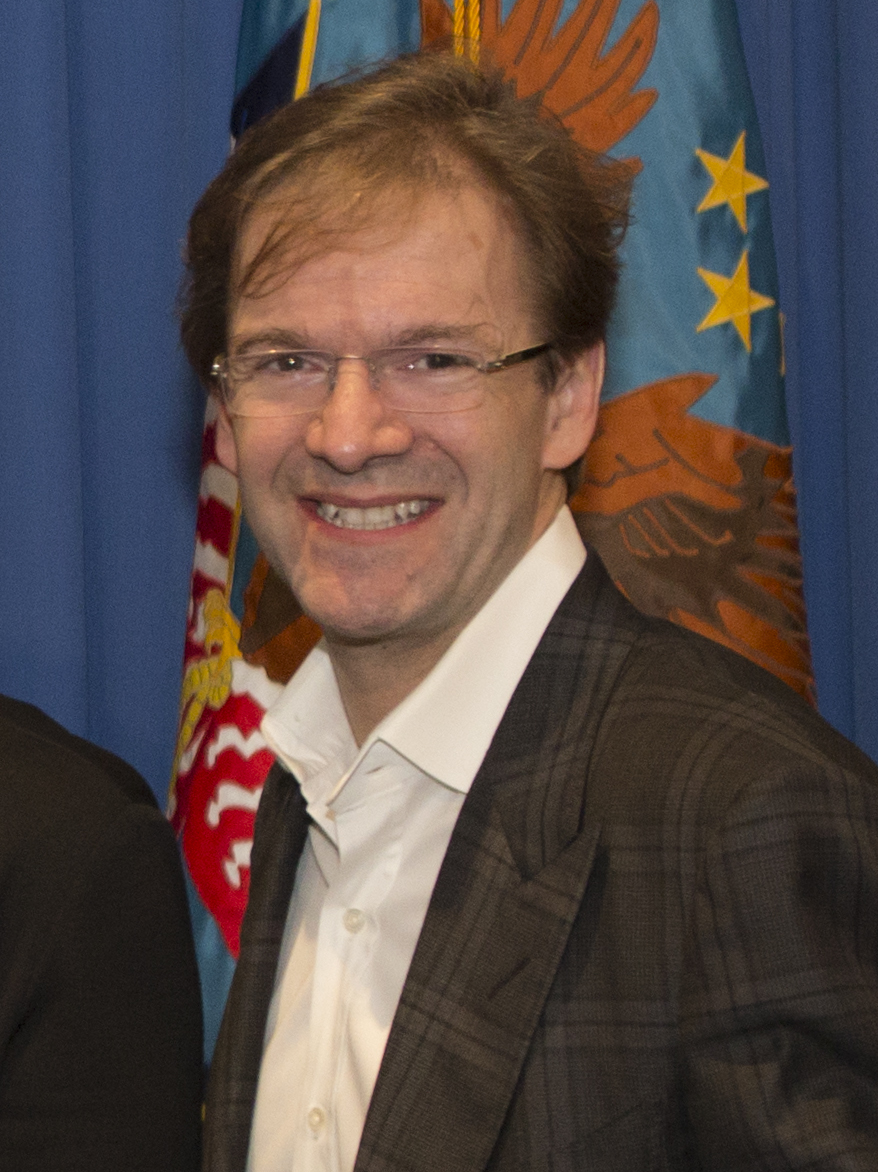

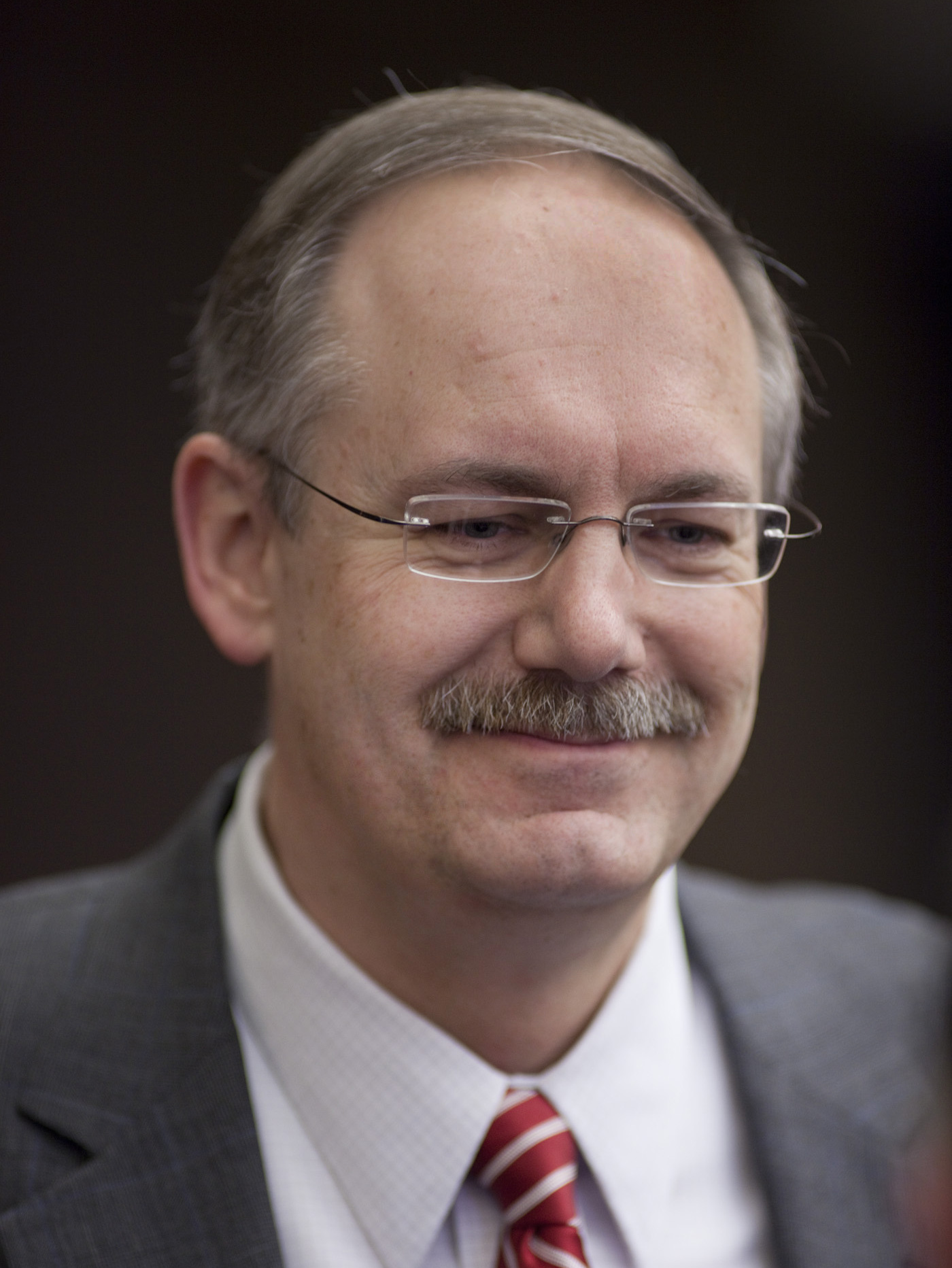
Candidate	Chris Abele	Jeff Stone
Popular vote	137,380	92,223
Percentage	59.64%	40.03%
County Executive before election
Marvin Pratt (interim)
Nonpartisan
Elected County Executive
Chris Abele
Nonpartisan

The 2011 Milwaukee County Executive special election took place on April 5, 2011, following a primary election on February 15, 2011. County Executive Scott Walker was elected Governor of Wisconsin in 2010, triggering a special election. Walker resigned as County Executive on December 27, 2010, which temporarily elevated Lee Holloway, the Chairman of the County Board of Supervisors, as acting County Executive. Holloway subsequently named Marvin Pratt, the former acting Mayor of Milwaukee, as the interim County Executive until the special election took place.

Holloway ran in the special election, and was joined by philanthropist Chris Abele, State Representative Jeff Stone, former State Senator Jim Sullivan, and activist Ieshuh Griffin. Stone, a Republican, placed first in the primary with 43 percent of the vote. Abele narrowly defeated Stone for second place, 25–22 percent, and advanced to the general election with Stone. Abele defeated Stone by a wide margin, winning 60 percent of the vote.

== Primary election ==
=== Candidates ===
- Jeff Stone, State Representative
- Chris Abele, businessman, philanthropist
- Jim Sullivan, former State Senator
- Lee Holloway, Chairman of the County Board of Supervisors, former Acting County Executive
- Ieshuh Griffin, community activist

==== Declined ====
- Sue Black, County Parks Director
- Gerry Broderick, County Supervisor
- Joseph Czarnezki, County Clerk
- Dan Diliberti, County Treasurer
- Marina Dimitrijevic, County Supervisor
- Jon Richards, State Representative
- Johnny Thomas, County Supervisor
- Sheldon Wasserman, former State Representative

=== Results ===
Primary election results
Party	Candidate	Votes	%
Nonpartisan	Jeff Stone	42,113	42.88%
Nonpartisan	Chris Abele	24,884	25.34%
Nonpartisan	Jim Sullivan	21,266	21.65%
Nonpartisan	Lee Holloway	8,287	8.44%
Nonpartisan	Ieshuh Griffin	1,520	1.55%
Write-in		141	0.14%
Total votes		98,211	100.00%

== General election ==
=== Results ===
2011 Milwaukee County Executive special election results
Party	Candidate	Votes	%
Nonpartisan	Chris Abele	137,380	59.64%
Nonpartisan	Jeff Stone	92,223	40.03%
Write-in		753	0.33%
Total votes		230,356	100.00%
