= GrocerKey =

GrocerKey was a Madison, Wisconsin-based company that provides e-commerce software for grocery stores.

== History ==
GrocerKey was founded in 2014 by Jeremy Neren in Madison, Wisconsin. Before launching the company, Neren started a grocery delivery service in 2006 for college students at the University of Wisconsin, Madison. He worked on the company for 9 years before taking his experience to launch GrocerKey. In 2015, GrocerKey participated in Gener8tor, a Wisconsin startup accelerator program.

In 2015, Wisconsin-based grocery chain Woodman’s Markets signed up to be a GrocerKey customer and also became the company’s lead investor. That same year, company closed a seed round of equity and convertible debt funding form Woodman’s, SymphonyAlpha Ventures, Gener8tor, Angels on the Water, and the BrightStar Wisconsin Foundation.

In April 2018, the company announced that it had secured $2.5 million in angel investments from Woodman's, dunnhumby Ventures and other Midwestern-based angel investors.

GrocerKey was acquired by Point Pickup Technologies in August 2021 for $42 million.

== See also ==
- Peapod
