= Understory (company) =

Weather forecasting company

Understory (founded in 2012 as WInstruments) is a company that forecasts weather and collects data using a grid of weather-sensing hardware that tracks weather from the ground level.

== History ==
Although originally known as WInstruments, founder and CEO Alex Kubicek changed the company name to Subsidence and joined Gener8tor, a group in Madison, Wisconsin that provides funding to startups. After receiving funding from Gener8tor, the company moved to Boston to the Bolt hardware accelerator. Kubicek soon renamed the company “Understory,” and combined funding from Gener8tor and Bolt came to $68,000. After raising $1.9 million in seed funding led by True Ventures, with participation by RRE Ventures, Vegas Tech Fund, SK Ventures, and Andrew C. Payne, the company moved from Madison to Boston, Massachusetts.

Headquarters was set up in Somerville at the clean tech incubator, Greentown Labs, and the company set up pilot tests in Kansas City, Missouri, Dallas, Texas, and Boston. Series A funding resulted in another $7.5 million for the company, co-led by 4490 Ventures and Monsanto Growth Ventures and joined by CSA Partners, True Ventures, RRE Ventures, and SK Ventures. The company then announced a plan to move back to Madison, Wisconsin.

The company's first customer was American Family Insurance, which uses weather data to adjust claims.

== Device ==
Understory makes solar-powered weather stations that detect three-dimensional rain, hail, wind and other weather in real-time at the ground level, instead of using atmospheric data like traditional weather detectors. Each weather station is about 1 foot wide and 2 feet tall, and connects in a grid through cellular connections. The stations can collect up to 3,000 data points per minute.
