= Ward 4 (coworking space) =

Coworking space and startup accelerator in Milwaukee, WI

Ward 4 LLC privately funds a space in Milwaukee, Wisconsin for startup accelerators and co-working. It is currently located in the John Pritzlaff Hardware Company Building.

The 12,000 square foot space for Ward 4 is privately funded by Milwaukee County executive Chris Abele and is considered a second step for his venture investment group, CSA Partners LLC to "spur economic development" through creation of a space for early-stage companies to meet. Desk and office space are leased through membership.

Current tenants include CSA Partners LLC, Quarles & Brady, public relations/lobbying group The Firm LLC, Gener8tor, DevCodeCamp, and BrightCellars.

== See also ==
- Argosy Foundation
- BrightStar Wisconsin Foundation
- Wisconsin Economic Development Corporation
- Wisconsin Investment Partners
- Y Combinator (company)
- Techstars
- Business incubator
- Seed accelerator
- CSA Partners
