= 2008 Milwaukee County Executive election =

- April 1, 2008
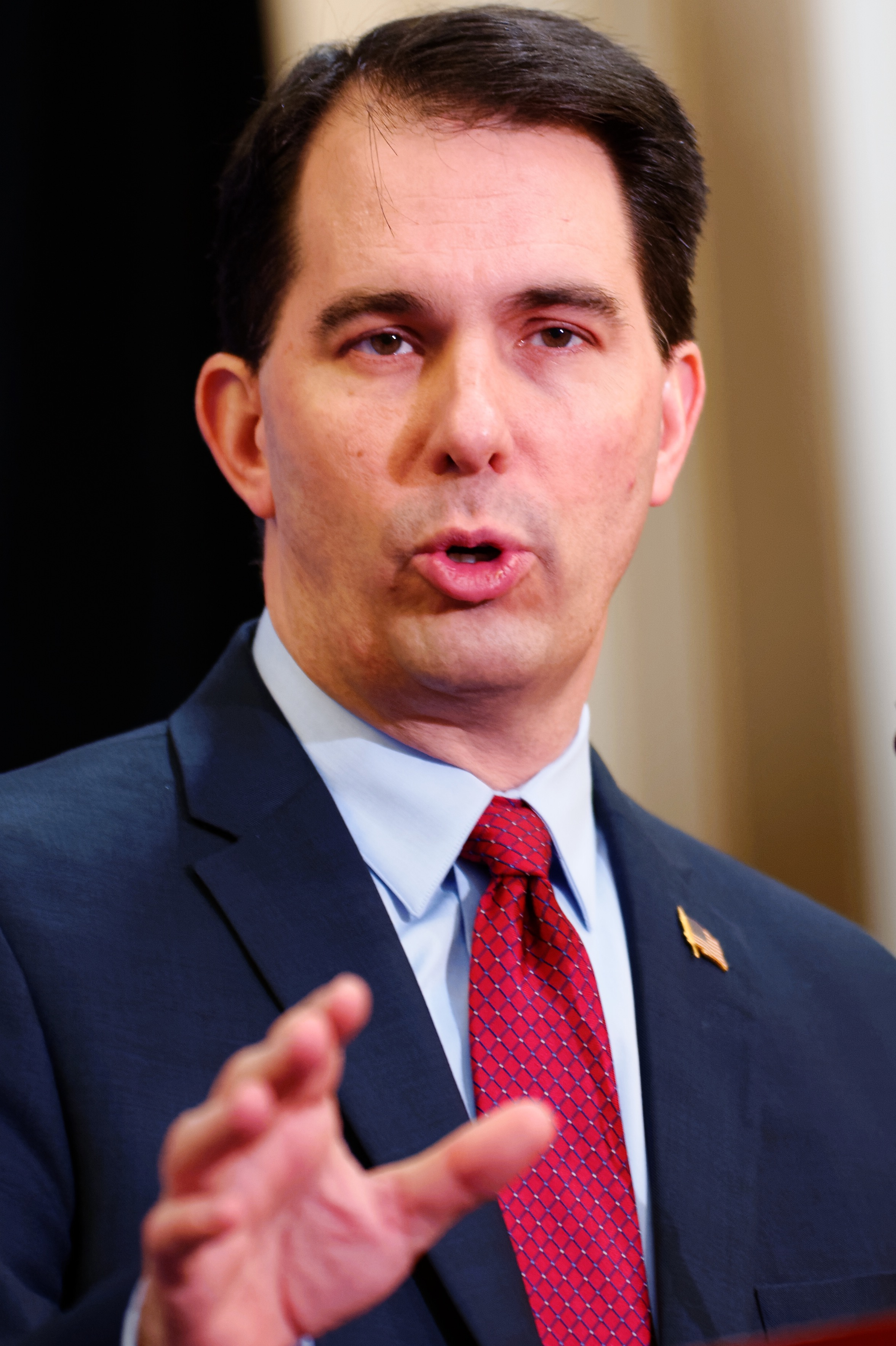

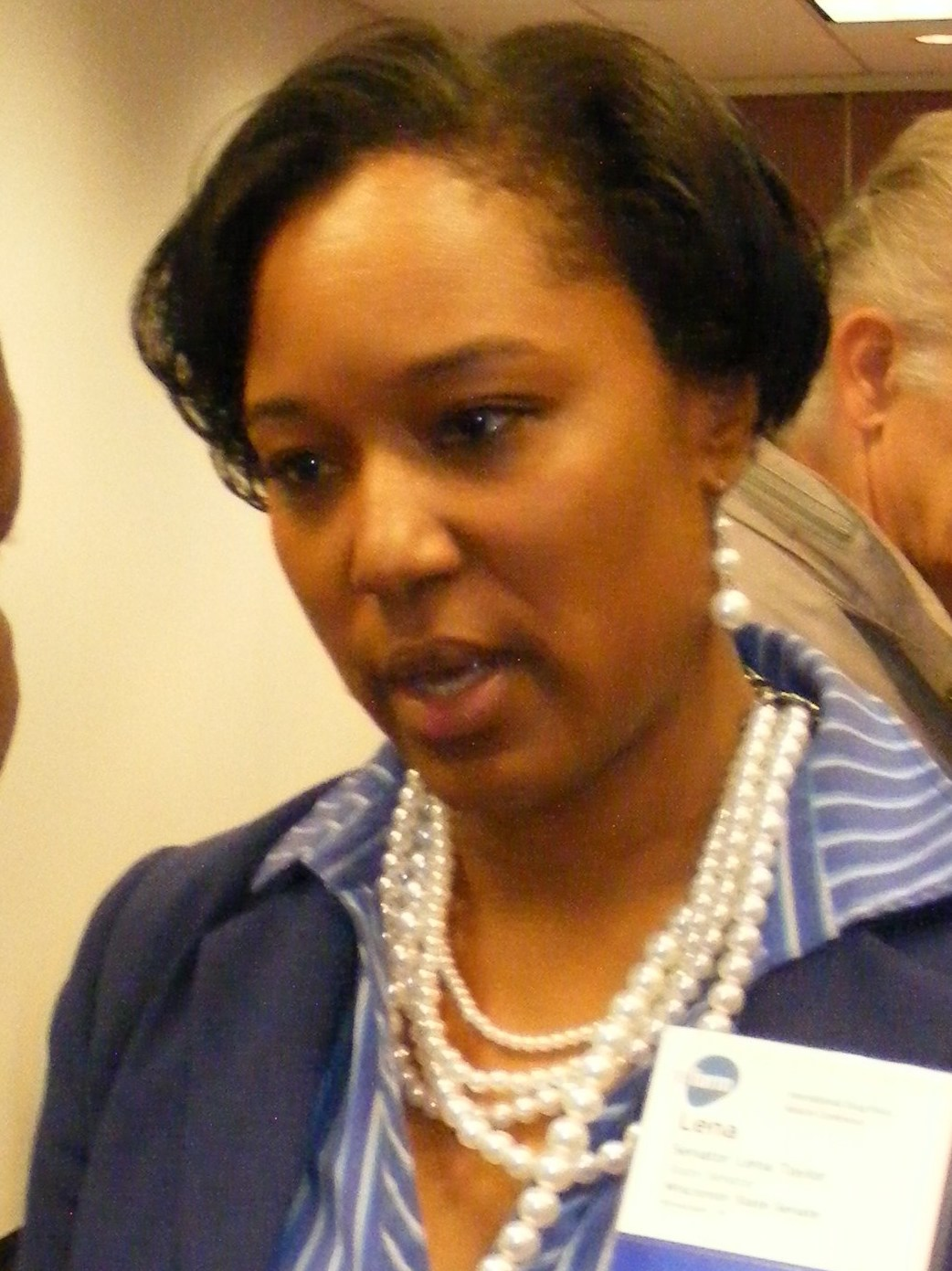
Candidate	Scott Walker	Lena Taylor
Party	Nonpartisan	Nonpartisan
Popular vote	98,039	68,785
Percentage	58.66%	41.16%
- Precinct results Walker: 40–50% 50–60% 60–70% 70–80% 80–90% Taylor: 50–60% 60–70% 70–80% 80–90% >90% Tie: 50-60% No votes
County Executive before election
Scott Walker
Nonpartisan
Elected County Executive
Scott Walker
Nonpartisan

The 2008 Milwaukee County Executive election took place on April 1, 2008 in Milwaukee County, Wisconsin, US. Incumbent Republican County Executive Scott Walker ran for re-election to a second full term. He was challenged by Democratic State Senator Lena Taylor. Because they were the only two candidates on the ballot, the primary election was cancelled and they proceeded to the general election. Though Taylor waged an aggressive campaign against Walker, he ultimately defeated her by a wide margin, winning 59 percent of the vote to her 41 percent.

However, Walker did not end up serving his full term as County Executive. He was elected Governor of Wisconsin in 2010 and resigned from office thereafter, triggering a 2011 special election.

== General election ==
=== Candidates ===
- Scott Walker, incumbent County Executive
- Lena Taylor, State Senator

=== Campaign ===
Taylor announced that she would challenge Walker for re-election on October 2, 2007, arguing that she would "restore balance, integrity and fiscal accountability." Though Walker was the favorite for re-election given his higher name recognition as an incumbent and his strong fundraising, Taylor aimed to use the higher turnout from the Milwaukee mayoral election and the presidential primary to her advantage.

However, Walker's campaign raised significantly more money than Taylor's did, including from out-of-state donors who supported his conservative stances, enabling him to outspend her nearly two-to-one.

Though the race was formally nonpartisan, the race had partisan overtones. Walker campaigned on his conservative governance, and attacked Taylor as a "tax-and-spend" liberal, while Taylor argued that Walker was a partisan Republican who was too close to go business. While Walker argued for the privatization of some county government operations, Taylor criticized him for raising fares and cutting routes on the Milwaukee County Transit System.

=== Polling ===
Poll source	Date(s) administered	Sample size (Note: Key: A – all adults RV – registered voters LV – likely voters V – unclear)	Margin of error	Scott Walker	Lena Taylor	Undecided
Mellman Group	November 28–29, 2007	500 (LV)	± 4.9%	41%	35%	24%

=== Results ===
2008 Milwaukee County Executive election results
Party	Candidate	Votes	%
Nonpartisan	Scott Walker (inc.)	98,039	58.66%
Nonpartisan	Lena Taylor	68,785	41.16%
Write-in		294	0.18%
Total votes		167,118	100.00%
