= 1996 Milwaukee mayoral election =

- March 19, 1996
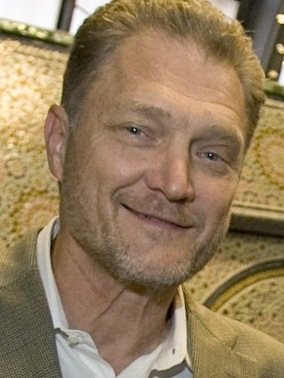

Candidate	John Norquist	Richard Artison
Popular vote	82,148	54,972
Percentage	59.91%	40.09%
Mayor before election
John Norquist
Elected mayor
John Norquist

The 1996 Milwaukee mayoral election was held on March 19, 1996, to elect the mayor of Milwaukee. Incumbent mayor John Norquist was re-elected to a third term in office.

== Candidates ==
- Richard Artison, former sheriff of Milwaukee County (1984–1995) and former U.S. Secret Service agent
- John Norquist, incumbent mayor since 1988

== Campaign ==
Incumbent mayor John Norquist had first been elected in 1988. His 1988 candidacy was boosted by support from a coalition of liberal-leaning white voters and black voters. Norquist was generally described to be a political progressive on maters such as transit, employment policies, and environmentalism; as well as a believer in new urbanism. However, he also held certain positions that departed from the city's prior liberal orthodoxy, including his stances in support of ending welfare and cutting the city's budget. While generally popular, Norquist faced political opposition, particularly stemming from to the implementation of a requirement that city and school district employees be residents of the city. Opposition arising from this was particularly pronounced from including among those employed in affected careers, including police, teachers, and members of municipal employee unions.

Norquist's sole challenger was Artison, the former sheriff of Milwaukee County. Artison, the first black person to serve as a sheriff in the state of Wisconsin, was seeking to make history again by being elected Milwaukee's first black mayor. Artson had served as sheriff from 1984 until retiring from that office in 1995, having been elected as a Democrat to six consecutive two-year terms. An October 1995 opinion poll showed Norquist and Artison to be the city's two most popularly-liked elected officials. Norquist and Artison both advanced from the primary to the two-candidate general election.

The campaign did not take a racial or overly negative tone. This was in contrast to the negative and racial tone of the coinciding circuit court election between incumbent Russell Stamper (who was black) and white opponent Robert Crawford (who was white).

Norquist's candidacy likely benefited from his incumbency, as incumbents rarely had been unseated in Milwaukee mayoral elections. A scientific exit poll indicated that Norquist voters' decision had been most motivated by their perception that he was the candidate who was "most competent for the job [of mayor]".

Local journalist Bruce Murphy did not believe that Artison had campaigned with much tenacity, writing, "perhaps no political challenger in recent Wisconsin history has campaigned in such a leisurely...fashion." Nevertheless, the election was widely anticipated to be a close result.

== Opinion polls ==
An October 1995 poll of a head-to-head matchup between Norquist and Artison showed Norquist receiving 48% of support and Artison receiving 40% of support among likely voters.

== Result ==
Election result
Candidate	Votes	%
John Norquist (incumbent)	82,148	59.91
Richard Artison	54,972	40.09
Total votes	137,120	100
