= Dennis Conta =

American politician and consultant

Conta, circa 1970s

Dennis Conta (born March 24, 1940) is an American politician and consultant.

Born in Milwaukee, Wisconsin, Conta graduated from Casimir Pulaski High School. He served in the United States Army 1962-1964 He received his bachelor's degree from Ripon College and his master's degrees from Harvard University and University of Wisconsin–Milwaukee. He served in the Wisconsin State Assembly as a Democrat until 1976, when he was appointed Secretary of the Wisconsin Department of Revenue. In 1979, he left government to form a consulting and management business: Conta&Associates.

Conta was the runner-up in the 1980 Milwaukee mayoral election. He ran on a proposal of creating a municipal income tax, in order to have suburban-residing downtown workers captured in the revenue collection of the city. Conta placed first against incumbent Henry Maier in the nonpartisan primary, but lost to Maier the general election. Conta ran in the 1988 Milwaukee mayoral election, being considered a major candidate, but withdrew his candidacy before the primary.
