= Wisconsin Investment Partners =

Venture capital fund

- Industry: Venture capital
- Founded: 2000
- Founder: Dick Leazer, Terry
- Headquarters: Madison, Wisconsin, United States
- Website: www.wisinvpartners.com

Wisconsin Investment Partners, founded in 1999, is a venture capital fund backed by a Madison, Wisconsin angel investing group. The group has invested more than $20 million in more than 40 early-stage companies, and in 2014 was one of the 10 most active angel investing groups. The group has over 75 members.

== History ==
The company was co-founded by Richard “Dick” Leazer and Terry Sivesind. Leazer retired as a co-manager in 2012 but remains a member of the advisory board.

== Investments ==
In 2014, it invested $11,000 in each company that graduated from Gener8tor.

Wisconsin Investment Partners is an investor in Aver Informatics, software for bundled payments in which doctors, hospitals, and other health care providers accept a set amount for an episode of care, such as knee-replacement surgery. It has also invested in: FluGen, Murfie, Phoenix, Zurex Pharma, and SHINE Medical Technologies.

== See also ==
- Argosy Foundation
- BrightStar Wisconsin Foundation
- Business incubator
- CSA Partners
- Gener8tor
- Seed accelerator
- Ward 4
- Wisconsin Economic Development Corporation
- Techstars
- Y Combinator (company)
