= Marvin Pratt =

American politician

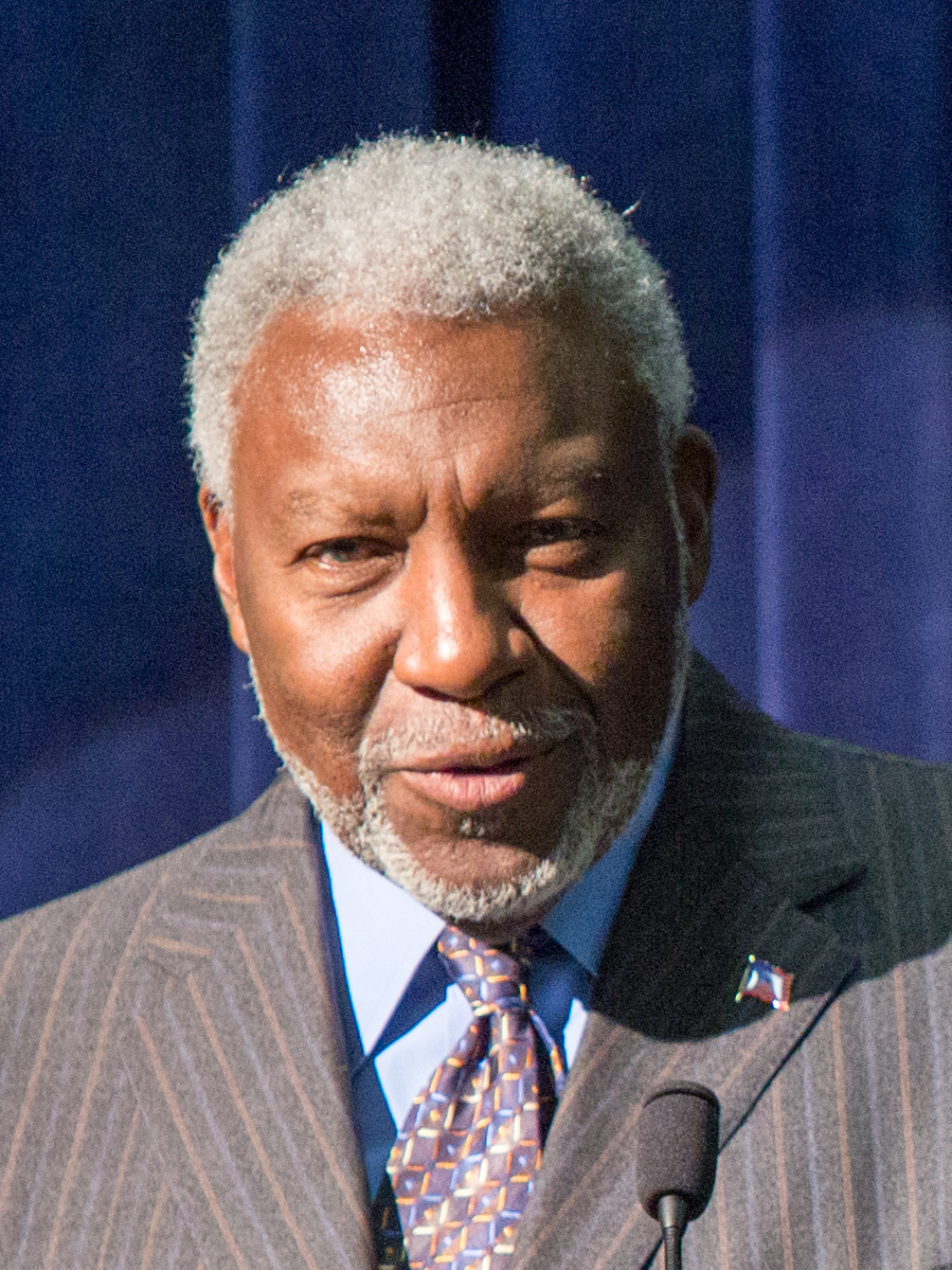
- Pratt in 2017

Interim Milwaukee County Executive
- In office February 4, 2011 – April 25, 2011
- Preceded by: Lee Holloway (acting)
- Succeeded by: Chris Abele

Acting Mayor of Milwaukee
- In office January 1, 2004 – April 19, 2004
- Preceded by: John Norquist
- Succeeded by: Tom Barrett

President of the Milwaukee Common Council
- In office July 17, 2000 – July 11, 2004
- Preceded by: John Kalwitz
- Succeeded by: Willie L. Hines Jr.

Personal details
- Born: May 26, 1944 (age 82) Dallas, Texas, U.S.
- Party: Democratic
- Spouse: Dianne Pratt
- Children: 2
- Education: Marquette University

Marvin E. Pratt (born May 26, 1944) is an American politician who served as acting mayor of Milwaukee in 2004 and as interim Milwaukee County Executive in 2011. He was the first African-American to act as mayor of Milwaukee.

== Early life ==
Pratt was born on May 26, 1944, to Leon Pratt Sr., a United States Naval officer, and Mildred Joyce Pratt in Dallas, Texas. While living in Dallas, he attended a local Catholic school with his twin sister, Marielle, until his family moved to Milwaukee, Wisconsin, in 1959, following the death of his father in a car accident in 1949. He has two sisters, Gwen and Reba, and a brother, Leon Jr.. Pratt graduated from North Division High School in 1962 and immediately joined the United States Air Force. He was stationed in the Libyan desert during the Vietnam War and was honorably discharged in the mid 60s. When he returned to Milwaukee after his service, he enrolled in Marquette University and gained a degree in political science in 1972. Pratt became an intern for mayor Henry Maier and began climbing a ladder of local government jobs.

== Political life ==
Pratt ran for an aldermanic seat in 1984, a tense time for race relations in the city. During this year, there was a racial divide over whether or not to rename what was then known as North 3rd Street to Dr. Martin Luther King Drive. Despite his loss to Roy B. Nabors in 1984, he ran for the same seat and won in a 1986 special election. Upon his election in 1986, Pratt was appointed to the Finance and Personnel Committee, where he continuously served as member and eventually chairman from 1996 to 2000. One of his notable victories while serving on the Common Council was the creation of the Resident's Preference Program in 1991, as described on the official website of the City of Milwaukee:

"The RPP certification is designed to promote the use of city residents as part of a contractor’s or developer's workforce on certain city-funded construction and private development projects. Contractors bidding on public works projects and development projects financed with public tax dollars must hire a percentage of RPP-certified City of Milwaukee residents to work on these projects."

This program is still in effect today, and has been expanded to include private businesses.

In 2000, Pratt was elected the president of the Common Council: "...he was motivated to run after seeing so many vacant boarded up houses never changing in Milwaukee neighborhoods. The city was divided and the city workforce and federal departments didn't represent Milwaukee's population."

When mayor John Norquist stepped down in 2004 three months before his term expired, Pratt became acting mayor. He was the first African-American to act as mayor of Milwaukee. Pratt ran in a primary election for the mayoral seat and finished first from a field of thirteen candidates during the primary. He lost his bid to Tom Barrett in the 2004 general election.

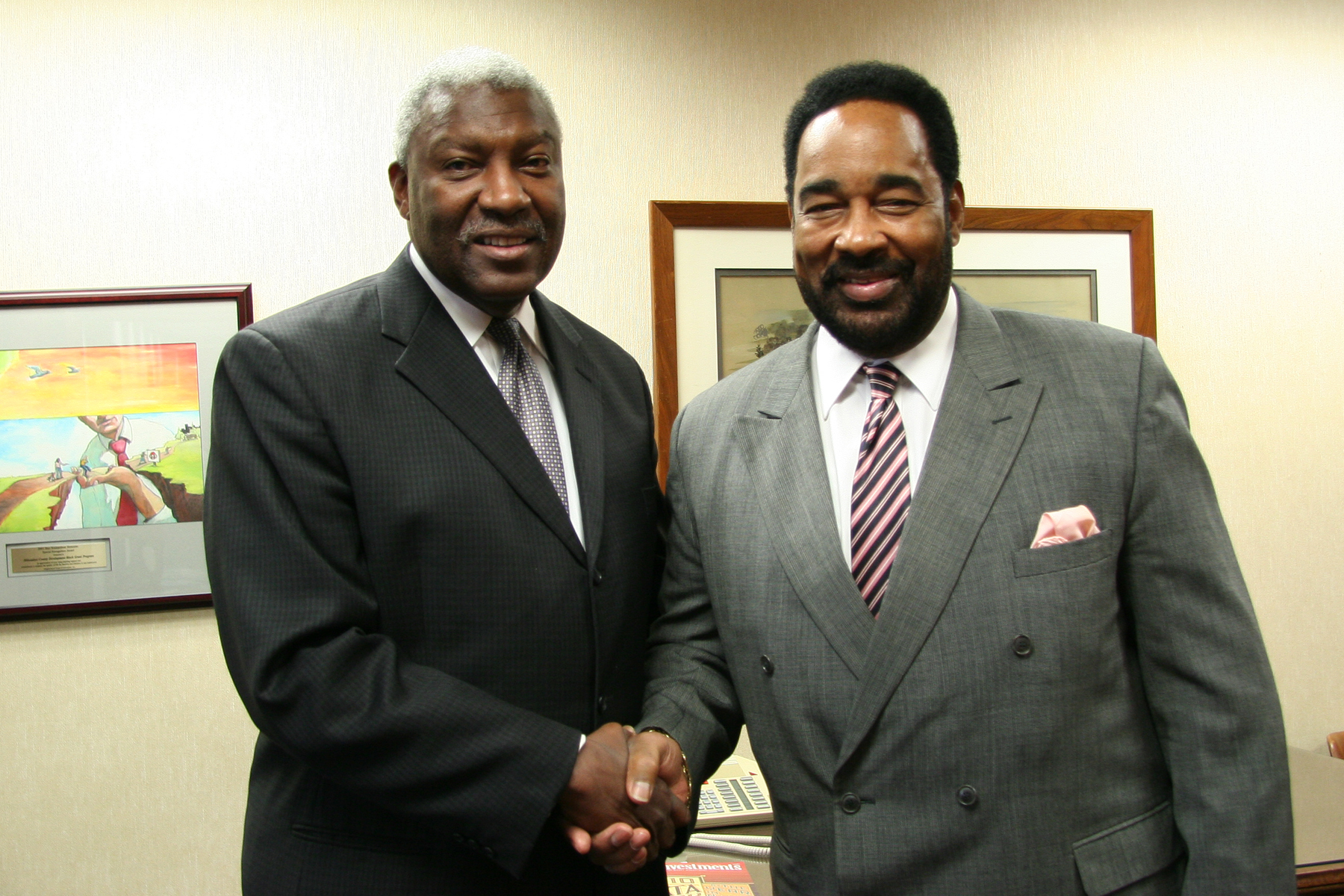
Pratt (left) with Lee Holloway in 2011

On February 4, 2011, Pratt was sworn in as interim Milwaukee County Executive. Appointed by County Board Chairman Lee Holloway, he filled the unexpired term of former Milwaukee County Executive Scott Walker, who was elected governor of Wisconsin, until the special Spring Election held on April 5, 2011. Upon being sworn in, Pratt became the first person to have acted as both Milwaukee Mayor and Milwaukee County Executive.

On April 5, 2011, Chris Abele defeated Republican challenger Jeff Stone, capturing over 61% of the vote and succeeded Pratt to serve out the remainder of then-County Executive Scott Walker's original term.

== Personal life ==
In October 2015, the Milwaukee Public School Board passed a resolution to rename Silver Spring Elementary after Pratt. On July 15, 2016, the school was officially renamed Marvin E. Pratt Elementary School.

== Electoral history ==
- 2004 Race for Mayor (Milwaukee)
  - Tom Barrett (D), 54%
  - Marvin Pratt (D) (inc.), 46%

== See also ==
- List of first African-American mayors

Preceded by John Norquist	Mayor of Milwaukee; 2004 (acting mayor)	Succeeded by Tom Barrett
