= Jim Sullivan (Wisconsin politician) =

21st century American politician

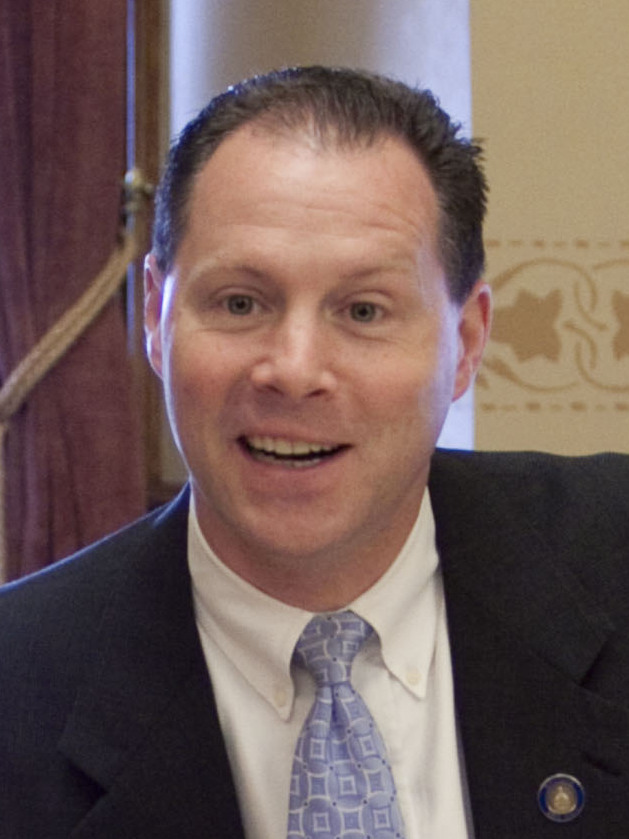
- Sullivan in 2009

Member of the Wisconsin Senate from the 5th district
- In office January 3, 2007 – January 3, 2011
- Preceded by: Thomas G. Reynolds
- Succeeded by: Leah Vukmir

Personal details
- Born: December 26, 1967 (age 58) Astoria, Oregon, U.S.
- Party: Democratic
- Spouse: Linda
- Children: 2
- Education: University of Wisconsin–Madison (B.A.); Marquette University Law School (J.D.)
- Profession: Lawyer

Military service
- Allegiance: United States
- Branch/service: United States Navy Reserve
- Years of service: 1998–2006

James Owen "Jim" Sullivan (born December 26, 1967) is an American lawyer and Democratic politician from Milwaukee County, Wisconsin. He was a member of the Wisconsin Senate, representing the 5th Senate district during the 2007–2008 and 2009–2010 sessions.

== Political campaigns ==
Sullivan entered politics in 1996 by running unsuccessfully for a seat on the Milwaukee County Board. In April 2000, Sullivan won a seat on the Wauwatosa Common Council. He was re-elected as alderman in 2004.

In 2006, he defeated Senator Thomas G. Reynolds (R-West Allis) by 3.5 percent of the vote. In 2010, Republican State Representative Leah Vukmir (R-Wauwatosa) defeated Sullivan by 4.5 percent of the vote.

Shortly after losing his Senate seat, Sullivan ran in the 2011 primary election to succeed Scott Walker as Milwaukee County Executive. However, he placed third in the February primary, thus failing to advance to the April general election between the top two vote-getters.

== Electoral history ==
=== Wisconsin Senate (2006, 2010) ===
Wisconsin Senate, 5th District Election, 2006
| Party | Candidate | Votes | % | ±% |
|---|---|---|---|---|
General Election, November 7, 2006
| Democratic | Jim Sullivan | 36,148 | 51.68% | +4.96% |
| Republican | Tom Reynolds (incumbent) | 33,686 | 48.16% | −4.69% |
| N/a | Scattering | 109 | 0.16% | |
| Plurality | | 2,462 | 3.52% | -2.60% |
| Total votes | | 69,943 | 100.0% | +16.63% |

Wisconsin Senate, 5th District Election, 2010
| Party | Candidate | Votes | % | ±% |
|---|---|---|---|---|
General Election, November 2, 2010
| Republican | Leah Vukmir | 36,852 | 52.15% | |
| Democratic | Jim Sullivan (incumbent) | 33,702 | 47.69% | −3.99% |
| N/a | Scattering | 109 | 0.15% | |
| Plurality | | 3,150 | 4.46% | +0.94% |
| Total votes | | 70,663 | 100.0% | +1.03% |

=== Milwaukee County Executive (2011) ===
Milwaukee County Executive Election, 2011
| Candidate | Votes | % |
|---|---|---|
Nonpartisan Primary, February 15, 2011
| Jeff Stone | 42,113 | 42.88% |
| Chris Abele | 24,884 | 25.34% |
| Jim Sullivan | 21,266 | 21.65% |
| Lee Holloway | 8,287 | 8.44% |
| Total votes | 96,550 | 100.0% |

Wisconsin Senate
| Preceded by Thomas G. Reynolds | Member of the Wisconsin Senate from the 5th district January 3, 2007 – January 3, 2011 | Succeeded by Leah Vukmir |
