= West Muskingum High School =

Location
- 150 Kimes Road; Zanesville, Ohio 43701; United States; 39°57′27″N 82°05′02″W

Information
- Established: 1962
- School district: West Muskingum Local School District
- Principal: Brady Harrison
- Grades: 9-12
- Enrollment: 370 (2024-2025)
- Average class size: 25-30
- Hours in school day: 8am-2:30pm
- Colours: Blue and gold
- Athletics: OHSAA AA / AAA
- Athletics conference: Muskingum Valley League
- Mascot: Tornado
- Nickname: West M
- Team name: Tornadoes
- Rival: Tri Valley Scotties
- Accreditation: Ohio Department of Education
- Website: West Muskingum High School

West Muskingum High School is a public high school in Zanesville, Ohio, United States.

== Curriculum ==
Educational opportunities include a challenging "College Prep" curriculum, a post secondary enrollment options program, general studies, in-house vocational programs in business, life skills, technology, and agriculture, and 25 vocational programs are offered through the Vocational School District. West Muskingum also provides instruction for the developmentally handicapped and learning disabled. Advanced Placement courses are offered in English, Chemistry, Calculus, and History.

== Extracurricular activities ==
Student organizations include chess club, college club, Fellowship of Christian Athletes, Future Business Leaders of America, FFA, fishing club, Key Club, National Honor Society, pep club, quiz team, Students Against Destructive Decisions, ski club and TEAMS (Test of Engineering Aptitude, Mathematics, and Science).

=== Athletics ===
West Muskingum teams, known as the Tornadoes, compete in Ohio High School Athletic Association classification AA for the boys' teams and AAA for the girls' teams. The teams are in OHSAA District II and the Muskingum Valley League. West Muskingum Tornadoes teams include baseball, basketball, cheerleading, cross country, dance team (Twisters), football, golf, soccer, softball, swimming, track and field, volleyball, and wrestling.

=== Performing arts ===
Performing arts opportunities available to West Muskingum students include concert choir, a capella choir, concert band, jazz band, pep band, theater and the Tornado Marching Band.

== Notable alumni ==
- Jeff Stone, member of the Wisconsin State Assembly, 1998–2013
- Shane Tilton, the 2018 Young Stationers’ Prize award winner
