= Michael McGee Jr. =

American politician (born 1969)

Member of the Milwaukee Common Council from the 6th district
- In office 2004–2008
- Preceded by: Marlene Johnson-Odom
- Succeeded by: Milele Coggs

Personal details
- Born: Michael Imanu Jackson; October 7, 1969 (age 56) Milwaukee, Wisconsin, U.S.
- Education: University of Wisconsin–Milwaukee

Michael Imanu McGee Jr. (born Michael Imanu Jackson; October 7, 1969), is an American politician who served as alderman of Milwaukee's Sixth District. He was elected in April 2004 to become along with his father, former alderman Michael McGee Sr., the first father and son in the history of Milwaukee to serve on the Common Council. His controversial tenure on the Milwaukee Common Council culminated in his arrest on Memorial Day weekend, 2007. He subsequently won the primary election from jail and lost the general election for re-election.

== Early life ==
McGee is the eldest of nine children of former Milwaukee alderman and community activist Michael Imanu McGee Sr. McGee attended West Division High School but transferred to Bay View High School when West Division became the Milwaukee High School of the Arts and dropped its sports programs. At Bay View, McGee was a standout wrestler, taking third in the state in the 126-pound weight class in his senior year. McGee was popular and well-liked at Bay View, where he was elected Prom King.

Upon graduating from Bay View, McGee attended the University of Wisconsin–La Crosse where he joined the Army and served in the National Guard. In mid-1991, McGee left UW–La Crosse and moved back to Milwaukee. On December 31, 1991, at barely 22 years old, McGee declared his candidacy for mayor of Milwaukee, challenging incumbent mayor John Norquist in the 1992 mayoral election. McGee finished a distant third in a primary field of six candidates.

In September 1992, McGee enrolled at the University of Wisconsin–Milwaukee ("UWM"). He graduated from UWM in August 1999 at the age of 29 with a degree in political science and began working as an academic advisor for UWM in a program assisting middle school students.

== Early run-ins with the law ==
Before being elected to office, McGee had numerous run-ins with the law.

- In 1992, McGee was ticketed for disorderly conduct.
- In 1993, McGee was convicted of providing false information to a law enforcement officer. McGee left the scene of a property damage accident, traveling at high speed even after officers began to pursue him. Once stopped, he provided a false date of birth and possessed an identification card with the false birth date. Court records said that he was driving with a suspended license.
- In 1995, McGee was convicted of misdemeanor criminal damage to property for breaking a man's car windshield with a baseball bat. He was sentenced to four months in the House of Correction and 18 months of probation and ordered to perform community service and undergo an alcohol and drug assessment. His probation was later extended because he failed to make enough payments on restitution.

== Aldermanic elections ==
McGee's earliest aldermanic elections efforts were met with controversy. Following McGee's unsuccessful bid for mayor, in McGee's next electoral effort in 2000, Alderman Don Richards challenged the signatures on McGee's first election petition in 2000. Alderman Richards alleged that numerous of McGee's signatures were forged, used nonexistent addresses, or obtained by McGee when he did not live in the district. The election commission eventually determined that he had collected two more than the minimum number of signatures. Alderman Don Richards eventually easily defeated McGee to retain his seat as the Ninth District's alderman.

In a more hotly contested race in April 2003, McGee lost to Willie Wade for the Tenth District aldermanic seat vacated by Rosa Cameron following her conviction on federal charges of misappropriating federal funds. On primary election day, February 18, McGee ran into problems when the principal of North Division High School complained to UWM officials that McGee tried to get students at the school where he worked to help him campaign instead of attending school. UWM officials said McGee has admitted to using "poor judgment" in getting students involved in "inappropriate" campaign activity.

In 2004, McGee defeated Alderman Marlene Johnson-Odom, who had served 24 years as an alderman, to become the Sixth District's alderman.

Once in office, his first high-profile action was the creation of what he called a Rapid Response Team, which included neighborhood and community leaders mobilized in an effort to combat increasing community violence. In a press release issued at the time, McGee said: "The Rapid Response Team would be dispatched immediately when serious disputes between neighbors are reported, when there are complaints about police brutality and when residents and business owners have serious concerns about police response to burglar alarms. The team will respond to community concerns and will be on the scene to collect and exchange information and to document what's going on." The group, which stated its intention to make citizen's arrests, was variously described as an initiative to address black-on-black crime, a monitoring program to deal with police brutality and an information source for north side residents.

Following an investigation of the Opportunities Industrialization Center of Greater Milwaukee which resulted in charges against two of the agency's subsidiaries, the conviction of its former head, Carl Gee, and a guilty plea from former state Senator Gary George, McGee filed a complaint against United States Attorney Steven M. Biskupic with the United States Justice Department claiming racial bias and overzealous prosecution. In his letter, McGee claimed that the black community sees Biskupic, who is white, as "a plantation overseer ... whose sole purpose is to lynch black leadership and the institutions that support us."

== The beating of Frank Jude Jr. ==
Following the beating of Frank Jude Jr. by off-duty Milwaukee police officers, McGee led a demonstration of about 100 people about the slow pace of the investigation. McGee called District Attorney E. Michael McCann a "dumb ass", called Jude's attackers "hate mongers and KKK killers". He said, "Any man that would pull another man's pants down is a straight-up sick faggot", while adding that he did not mean to offend all homosexuals.

Numerous public officials called upon McGee to apologize for his use of the homosexual epithet, particularly State Senator Tim Carpenter, who is openly gay. When confronted by Carpenter, McGee refused to apologize and told Carpenter to "move out the way." He then walked into his office, causing Carpenter to shout after him, "Why are you hiding?"

Six of McGee's fellow aldermen signed a letter asking McGee to apologize. The letter, an unusual public rebuke of a colleague, called the beating of Jude "heinous and despicable", but denounced McGee's use of "hateful and inflammatory speech" and went on to note McGee's comments "dipped well below the common threshold of statesmanship and civil decorum that we hold dear." Milwaukee mayor Tom Barrett in reference to McGee's comments said, "he owes an apology to the gay community; he owes an apology to African-Americans in my office and African-American women in general", adding that McGee's remarks "go beyond what is acceptable for any mature adult or elected official."

McGee called for blacks to boycott downtown and central city shopping centers as a means of protesting the beating of Jude. These boycotts were widely criticized on the basis that they would disproportionately affect black workers and black business owners and thus be counterproductive, and that the targeted businesses were completely unrelated to any complained-of actions in the Jude case.

As the verdicts were read acquitting the three officers who were charged with beating Jude, McGee repeatedly said "bullshit" in court. Subsequently, McGee led demonstrations calling for United States Attorney Steven M. Biskupic to bring federal charges. Biskupic eventually did bring federal civil rights charges that resulted in the convictions of seven Milwaukee police officers.

== Wauwatosa arrest ==
In November 2005, McGee was arrested and was cited for disorderly conduct and resisting arrest in Wauwatosa following an incident in a Blockbuster parking lot. The incident began when the Blockbuster store manager called the police concerned about a suspicious car in the store's parking lot after the store closed. Police officers responded and made contact with McGee. The officers explained why they were called and McGee responded that he understood the employees' concerns. The officers told McGee he was free to go, but as he left, McGee shouted an obscenity at the employees in the store.

The police officers who were still on scene, then pulled McGee over. McGee then became combative with the officers, asking "What are you going to do about it, arrest me?" McGee's statement says he was then pulled from the car, handcuffed, struck with a closed fist on the side of his head and then had his head slammed against the hood of the squad car.

The police report says McGee was pushed to the hood of the car because he was struggling against the handcuffs. It said McGee claimed that he was punched in the head and was bleeding. But the police report said that there were no visible wounds and the dampness on his head was from water on the hood of the car.

Following the incident, McGee issued a statement indicating he had been meeting a friend to whom he'd planned to give a DVD on non-violence, and that he'd been in the parking lot just a minute when police arrived. A rally at the Wauwatosa police department following McGee's arrest resulted in an altercation after a white male said McGee was "out of line" and a "racist", and allegedly shoved a McGee supporter as the crowd converged upon him. A McGee supporter struck the white male on the head with a bullhorn and eventually five people, the white male and four of McGee's supporters, were all arrested for disorderly conduct.

McGee filed a complaint against the officers involved in the incident and following an investigation, Wauwatosa's police chief cleared the officers stating in a letter to McGee, "Clearly, your behavior throughout this situation caused your arrest." The police chief used McGee's own admission that he engaged in a brief "struggle" during the arrest in vindicating the officers. "Any type of physical resistance to a lawful arrest will result in officers utilizing tactics to gain control of the situation and to minimize force used against them", he said.

McGee eventually agreed to plead no contest to the municipal charge of resisting or obstructing an officer and the city agreed to drop the disorderly conduct charge.

== Name change ==
In May 2006, it came to light that McGee's true surname was Jackson. McGee filed a petition seeking to legally change his name from Michael Imanu Jackson to Michael Imanu McGee, the name he alleged he had used all his life. It was subsequently revealed the McGee had, in fact, frequently used the last name Jackson. For example, McGee had obtained a driver's license in the name of Jackson, which was subsequently suspended. Further, McGee was sued under the name of Jackson as a result of a traffic accident that occurred in 1996 when McGee was responsible for a three vehicle crash.

McGee was subsequently investigated by agents from the Social Security Administration regarding his use of two Social Security numbers. McGee later admitted that when his driver's license under the name McGee was suspended, he made up a Social Security number and got a license under the surname Jackson.

== Extramarital affair/restraining orders ==
On April 4, 2006, 23-year-old Kimley Rucker filed for a Domestic Abuse Restraining Order against McGee. The following day, McGee filed for a harassment restraining order against Rucker. At a hearing regarding the restraining order requests, McGee testified that he never had a "romantic" relationship with Rucker. However, Rucker claimed that she was pregnant by McGee for the second time (the first pregnancy resulted in a miscarriage). Rucker testified that she received emails from McGee from a certain email account. Although McGee testified that he never had the email account, his wife contradicted this and stated that he had the specific email account for as long as she knew him. McGee described Rucker as "a lying type of chick" and dismissed her allegations that he had impregnated her and, months later, grabbed and twisted her arm as "slanderous character assassination."

At a subsequent hearing, McGee admitted he had had a sexual relationship with Rucker but defended his earlier sworn statements against perjury accusations on the basis that although he had a sexual relationship with Rucker, the relationship was not "romantic." McGee also admitted using the specific email account but claimed numerous others also had access to the account.

The district attorney's office investigated McGee's contradictory statements for possible perjury but declined to prosecute on the basis that McGee's statement about the email account was not material to the proceeding and the ambiguity with respect to McGee's euphemistic explanation of his relationship as not "romantic" precluded the ability to prove falsity beyond a reasonable doubt. DNA tests later proved that McGee was the father of Rucker's child.

During a hearing in which a judge dismissed the restraining order that McGee had obtained against Rucker, McGee turned around and spoke to Rucker. Rucker reported that McGee said, "If you drive by my house, I'm going to kill your ass." For this statement, McGee was immediately arrested by the court's bailiffs. The incident did not result in criminal charges.

== Recall election ==
In October 2006, ViAnna Jordan began an effort to recall McGee. Among the reasons Jordan listed for the recall were "fraudulent use of alias names to avoid responsibility for accident damages", referring to the discovery that McGee held driver's licenses under both names, and to other incidents, such as arrests for disorderly conduct and perjury allegations, both from a series of restraining-order hearings involving the mother of his child, as well as calling a suspect in the beating of Frank Jude Jr. a "straight-up sick faggot" at a rally. Other reasons were more general, such as "has become an embarrassment to our community."

During the recall effort, Jordan and her supporters frequently reported that they were harassed by McGee's supporters. For example, a former Milwaukee School Board member, Leon Todd, received a restraining order against McGee for what Todd called continued harassment for his support of the recall effort against McGee. Todd was the campaign manager for recall organizer Jordan. During a radio show, McGee said that Todd should be "hung" for his "betrayal of the community."

He then gave out Todd's phone number over the air, leading to Todd receiving numerous harassing phone calls. Todd had long been a target of McGee and his father. For example, in 1996, McGee's father, also named Michael McGee, congratulated the person who fire bombed Todd's home, stating, "They are the kind of people I would like to pin a medal of honor on", and "My whole-hearted congratulations to the guerrilla who issued a little warning shot to Todd. I know where it came from."

McGee made numerous attempts to block the recall effort. In response to a Jordan supporter admitting in an affidavit that she misled people into signing the recall petitions, the Election Commission asked the District Attorney's office to investigate. This led to a secret John Doe hearing.

Although the Election Commission found evidence of "widespread fraud" in ViAnna Jordan's recall petition, the Commission nonetheless permitted the recall to proceed. In the eight-person primary election, McGee earned 64% of the vote, permitting him to remain in office without a run-off election.

However, the John Doe investigation continued, and, rather than uncovering evidence of fraud on the part of Jordan and the recall supporters, the investigation uncovered evidence of widespread election-related crimes on the part of McGee and his supporters. On June 4, 2007, McGee was charged with five misdemeanors and five felonies for his alleged conduct during the recall election and the subsequent investigation. According to the criminal complaint, McGee falsely reported to the Election Commission that he was approached within 100 feet of an open polling place and asked to sign a petition to keep the Malcolm X Academy open. However, two other witnesses, the person who was allegedly circulating the petition and a police sergeant who McGee contacted soon after the incident, both reported that McGee was fully aware that he was signing a petition seeking his recall when he signed the petition. McGee was charged with theft of two checks that were intended as campaign donations but instead McGee deposited the checks into an account of a local grocery store. McGee was also charged with four counts of election bribery relating to an alleged plan to pay voters or persons who recruited others to vote, including two undercover police officers, $5 for each vote.

McGee was also charged with filing false campaign finance reports and electioneering for allegedly distributing campaign literature at a polling place. He was also charged with two counts of criminal contempt for allegedly violating the secrecy order related to the John Doe proceedings. These alleged breaches of the secrecy order were recorded as a result of the court authorized wiretap.

== Federal investigation ==
Following complaints from various business owners in McGee's aldermanic district, the FBI launched an investigation into allegations that McGee was demanding bribes from business owners in exchange for McGee's support on various issues such as liquor licenses. As part of this investigation, business owners cooperated with the FBI in recording McGee allegedly demanding bribes. McGee allegedly demanded a bribe from an undercover FBI agent. Finally, after receiving approval from a federal judge, the FBI tapped McGee's phone.

The wiretap uncovered evidence of far more criminal activities. This secret year-long federal investigation came to light over Memorial Day weekend in 2007 when agents monitoring the wiretap overheard McGee discussing a plan to harm a person suspected of burglarizing the home of a McGee friend. Concerned that McGee was plotting to murder this individual, the agents decided to arrest McGee and end their investigation. McGee and two others were eventually charged with conspiracy to commit a felony and conspiracy to commit substantial battery, both felonies. On October 30, 2007, one of McGee's co-defendants pleaded guilty and agreed to testify against McGee.

According to the federal criminal complaint filed in the case, FBI agents using wiretaps and undercover surveillance, watched as McGee shook down a business owner who wanted to obtain or keep a liquor license and a gas station owner who sought to operate 24 hours a day. In February, an undercover agent approached McGee about putting a business with a liquor license in his district and paid a bribe, the complaint says. "McGee told the UCE (undercover agent) that he (McGee) is the gatekeeper for all new businesses in his area", the complaint says. At a fund-raiser, the agent gave McGee $1,000, most of it cash bundled in a rubber band, the complaint says. McGee told the agent, "I got you", the complaint says. At least two bribes were paid with money orders, one of which went to an attorney representing McGee in a paternity suit and another for "recall petition work", the complaint says. An affidavit in support of a search warrant alleged that McGee used his Rapid Response Team to demand bribes from business owners in McGee's district. Rather than using the money for to improve the community, the affidavit alleged that McGee used the money to pay his personal expenses.

After $50,000 bail was posted in the state case, McGee was promptly taken into federal custody. A United States magistrate judge initially granted McGee bail but imposed numerous restrictions. The government appealed the grant of bail and Chief Judge Rudolph T. Randa ordered McGee detained pending trial. Randa cited concerns that if allowed home, even under severe restrictions, McGee would attempt to intimidate witnesses and sway their testimony on both state and federal charges. While in custody, McGee made recorded telephone calls in which he allegedly discussed influencing witnesses. McGee appealed the denial of bail to the Seventh Circuit Court of Appeals, which denied the appeal without comment.

In his federal court case, McGee received a court-appointed attorney at government expense, despite the fact that McGee continued to receive his more-than $70,000 per year salary and a $337 per month vehicle allowance from the City of Milwaukee until he was eventually voted out of office.

McGee was subsequently indicted on nine felony counts. The indictment included five counts of bribery, three counts of extortion, and one financial-related violation, which relates to $15,000 in cash allegedly being wired out of state without the proper paperwork being done. A jury trial commenced on June 16, 2008.

The government presented the testimony of a McGee friend - turned informant - Jack Adel and numerous business owners in McGee's district who testified that they gave money to McGee associate - Dennis Walton - in exchange for his support in licensing matters that came before the Common Council. This testimony was corroborated by numerous recorded and videotaped conversations as well as numerous recorded telephone calls. When asked by Judge Clevert about the whereabouts of Walton, the U.S. Attorney Joseph Wall stated that the F.B.I. could not find Walton. McGee's attorney argued that McGee was set up by a politically motivated business owner.

On June 24, 2008, after roughly six hours of deliberation, the jury returned its verdict finding McGee guilty of all nine counts.

On October 28, 2008, McGee was sentenced to 6 ½ years in federal prison. The federal sentencing guidelines called for McGee to receive between 12 ½ and 15 ½ years in prison and the government called for a sentence within this range. The prosecutor called McGee's actions "flat-out racism", noting the evidence showed McGee targeted victims who were Middle Eastern or Indian. As the basis for his substantial departure from the guidelines, Judge Clevert stated that he had seen McGee become less defiant and more respectful of the law since he first appeared in court, cited the numerous good things McGee did in his one term in office, such as his gun buyback program, and noted that McGee extorted business owners to pay for rewards for information relating to crimes. Judge Clevert did not mention numerous aggravating factors such as the fact that the evidence demonstrated that McGee had also taken bribes and extorted money for his personal benefit, including for moving costs or attorneys' fees. At his sentencing, McGee wept, apologized to his family, the community, victimized business owners, the Milwaukee Common Council, and black pioneers who laid the groundwork for his accomplishments, and called himself, "immature", "selfish", "narcissistic", "spiritually flawed", and "a very poor, broken man". He was also ordered to pay $107,433 in restitution.

The criminal charges against McGee remain pending in state court. The state court trial began in May 2008 but was suspended when it was discovered that certain recorded conversations had not been translated. On the day following his sentencing in federal court, it was reported that McGee will plead guilty to one felony and one misdemeanor in state court as part of a plea deal.

== Election loss to Milele Coggs ==
McGee ran his re-election campaign in 2008 from behind bars, and won the first election versus several candidates. This story made the New York Times. On April 1, 2008, he lost to Milele A. Coggs, who garnered 3,098 votes (58% of total votes) to McGee's 2,224 votes (42%).
