= 2000 Milwaukee mayoral election =

- April 4, 2000
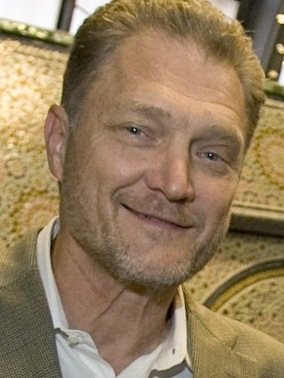

Candidate	John Norquist	George Watts
Popular vote	52,847	41,582
Percentage	55.97%	44.03%
Mayor before election
John Norquist
Elected mayor
John Norquist

The 2000 Milwaukee mayoral election was held on April 4, 2000, in order to elect the mayor of Milwaukee. Incumbent mayor John Norquist was re-elected to a fourth term in office.

== Candidates ==
- Wendell J. Harris, retired factory worker and Democratic Socialist
- John Norquist, incumbent mayor
- George Watts, owner of the Downtown Milwaukee business George Watts & Son Inc.

== Primary election ==
The primary election was held on February 8, 2000.

=== Results ===
Non-partisan primary results (February 8, 2000)
Candidate	Votes	%
John Norquist (incumbent)	21,674	51.94
George Watts	12,432	29.79
Wendell J. Harris	7,624	18.27
Total votes	41,730	100

== General election ==
On election day April 4, 2000, incumbent mayor John Norquist was re-elected to a fourth term by a margin of 11,265 votes. He was sworn in on April 19, 2000.

=== Results ===
General election results (April 4, 2000)
Party	Candidate	Votes	%
Nonpartisan	John Norquist (incumbent)	52,847	55.97
Nonpartisan	George Watts	41,582	44.03
Nonpartisan	Write-In	0	0.00
Total votes		94,429	100.00
Democratic hold			
