= John Norquist =

American politician (born 1949)

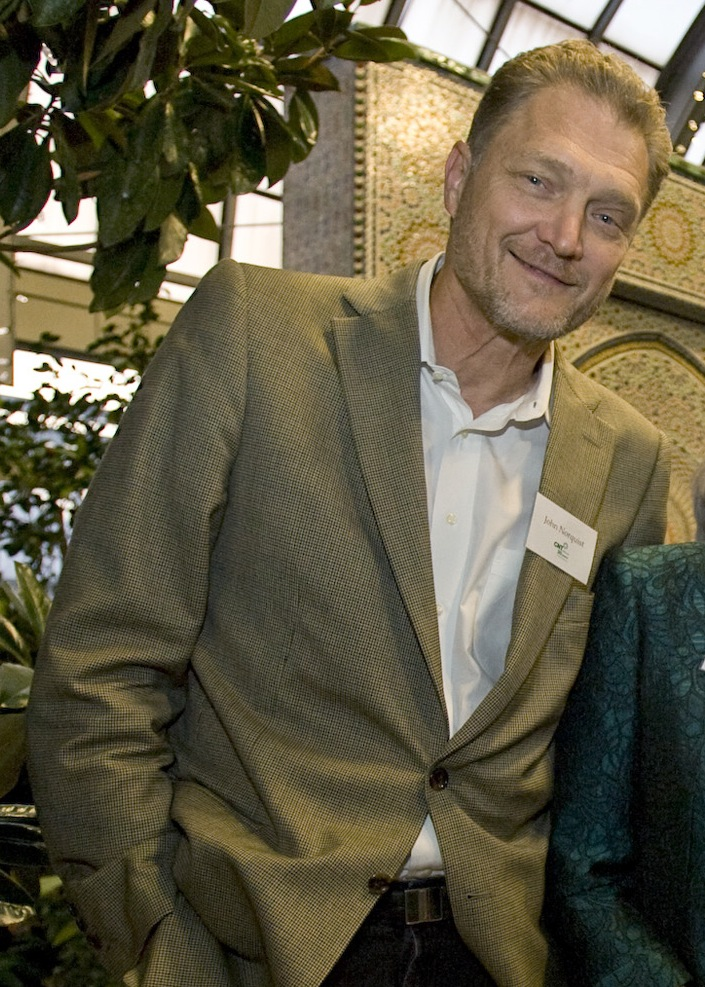
- Norquist in 2008

43rd Mayor of Milwaukee
- In office April 18, 1988 – January 1, 2004
- Preceded by: Henry Maier
- Succeeded by: Tom Barrett; Marvin Pratt (acting)

Member of the Wisconsin Senate from the 3rd district
- In office January 3, 1983 – April 15, 1988
- Preceded by: Jerry Kleczka
- Succeeded by: Brian Burke

Member of the Wisconsin State Assembly from the 8th district
- In office January 6, 1975 – January 3, 1983
- Preceded by: Earl Keegan Jr.
- Succeeded by: Lois Plous

Personal details
- Born: John Olof Norquist; October 22, 1949 (age 76) Princeton, New Jersey, U.S.
- Party: Democratic
- Spouse: Susan Mudd
- Children: 2
- Education: University of Wisconsin–Madison (B.A., M.P.A.)

Military service
- Allegiance: United States
- Branch/service: United States Army Reserve
- Years of service: 1971–1977

John Olof Norquist (born October 22, 1949) is a retired American politician, urbanist consultant, and author. He served as the 43rd mayor of Milwaukee, Wisconsin, winning four terms (1988–2004). He previously represented Milwaukee's south side in the Wisconsin State Assembly (1975–1983) and Wisconsin Senate (1983–1988). After serving as mayor, he worked for ten years as president of the Congress for the New Urbanism.

== Early life and career ==
Norquist was born in Princeton, New Jersey, where his father was attending seminary.

He attended Augustana College in western Illinois for two years, then transferred to the University of Wisconsin–Madison, where he graduated with his bachelor's degree in political science in 1971. Shortly after graduation, he enlisted in the United States Army Reserve and was trained as a medic. Later that year, he went to work at Milwaukee Electric Tool, where he operated machinery on the assembly line and also served as a first aid attendant.

== Wisconsin Legislature ==
=== Assembly ===
official portrait, 1975

official portrait, circa 1977

While working at Milwaukee Electric Tool in 1974, Norquist launched a primary challenge against incumbent state representative Earl Keegan Jr., in Wisconsin's 8th Assembly district. He ran against completing the Stadium South Freeway, which was to run from Milwaukee County Stadium south to I-894. In 1974, nearly 50% of the freeway segment was either built or the land was cleared for construction. Norquist defeated Keegan in the Democratic primary and faced no opposition in the general election. He continued to oppose the new freeway despite his constituents voting for completion in the November 1974 Milwaukee County freeway referendums (complementing the April 1967 city vote in favor of the Park East-Lake Freeway project).

In the Assembly, Norquist joined forces with emerging generation of legislators including James Moody (later a US representative) in opposing freeway expansion. Norquist was re-elected to three more terms in the Assembly.

=== Senate ===
official portrait, 1983

official portrait photograph, circa 1985

Norquist won a seat in the Wisconsin Senate in 1982. While in the Senate, Norquist served on the powerful Joint Finance Committee and was recognized by Milwaukee Magazine as a leading legislator. He was re-elected to another term in the Senate in 1986 and served as Assistant Majority Leader in the 1985–1986 and 1987–1988 sessions.

While serving in the Senate, Norquist also attended graduate school at the University of Wisconsin and earned his Master's in Public Administration in 1987.

== Mayor of Milwaukee (1988–2004) ==
From 1988 through 2004, Norquist served as mayor of Milwaukee

Norquist was once described as a "fiscally conservative socialist." He was strongly in favor of light rail as a solution for the city's transit problems and was known throughout the country for his anti-freeway stance and for the removal of the Park East Freeway, the largest highway ever purposely destroyed. He consistently reduced the property tax rate every year since becoming mayor and kept city budgets from growing beyond the rate of inflation.

In October 2003, local journalist Tom Bamberger reflected on Norquist, "a lousy politician in the ways Tommy Thompson was a good one. … He had good ideas instead of good friends." In 2007, Bamberger further reflected, "Norquist hadn't seen urban landscape and architecture as an issue. … But over time, he learned from urban theorists … and helped developers increase Milwaukee's value." In 2005, local journalist Kurt Chandler described Norquist as having succeeded as mayor at "demanding results from inflexible players", but having failed at challenge of "bringing rivals to the table".

=== Elections ===
In 1987, Milwaukee mayor Henry Maier announced he would not run for another term as mayor in 1988, and would leave office after 28 years in the role. Norquist announced his candidacy for mayor, advanced through the nonpartisan primary, and defeated former governor Martin J. Schreiber in the April 1988 general election, taking 54% of the vote.

Norquist was re-elected in 1992, 1996, and 2000.

=== First term (1988–1992) ===
One of the first controversies of Norquist's tenure occurred in 1988, when he took a trip to Israel. The trip was paid for by local Milwaukee Jewish organizations, but as a result of the controversy, Norquist afterward paid much of the cost himself. On his return, the Milwaukee Sentinel printed a political cartoon showing him getting off a plane dressed as a Hasidic Jewish rabbi. The cartoon created an uproar, and the Sentinel published an apology for it.

In June 1990, local journalist Bruce Murphy offered praise for the first years of Norquist's mayoralty, writing, "He has addressed a host of issues that his predecessor, Henry Maier, would have ignored – everything from local schools to transportation problems to arts programming to recreation in the Menomonee Valley." However, in October 1990, Murphy also criticized him as leveraging his position for cronyism and political vengeance, writing, "Most politicians reward their friends and punish their enemies. But the mayor seems to be pushing this maxim to extremes."

In January 1992, Norquist vetoed funding that the Milwaukee Common Council for cultural festivals due to the inclusion of $5,000 of funding for the Milwaukee Gay/Lesbian Pride Parade (which included PrideFest). 1992 was the first year in which the Common Council had opted to fund the city's pride parade. Norquist argued that while he supported gay rights, he objected to the city funding the parade because, "parades and festivals are meant to be non-controversial," characterizing gay pride as politically controversial. Norquist faced criticism from advocates of the event, including some accusations that he had vetoed the funding in a bid for greater support in his mayoral re-election that year. One member of the Milwaukee Lesbian/Gay Pride Committee alleged that years earlier, Norquist had contrarily encouraged the organization to seek city funding for its parade. Members of the Common Council sought to override the veto, but failed to secure enough members' votes to do so.

=== Fourth term (2000–2004) ===
In December 2000, Norquist's future as mayor was thrown into doubt after a staff assistant alleged that the mayor had sexually harassed her. Norquist admitted to a five-year consensual affair, but claimed that it was entirely consensual. Eventually, in April 2002, Norquist announced that he would not seek a fifth term as mayor in 2004.

In July, 2001, when the Communist Party held its 27th national convention in the University of Wisconsin-Milwaukee student union, Norquist sent the convention his greetings, noting commonalities between the city's socialist heritage and the goals of the Communist Party. Norquist later released a statement saying he "does not endorse Communist ideology and condemns many elements of Communist history."

In April 2001, local journalist Mary Van de Kamp Nohl wrote in strong rebuke of Norquist, "It took [his predecessor, Maier,] 24 years to become isolated and self-absorbed. John Norquist has done that in half the time."

When presented in June 2003 with the opportunity to lead the Congress for the New Urbanism, Norquist said that he would resign at the beginning of the following year rather than serve out his full term. The announcement was timed to prevent a special election. Instead, the head of the common council, Marvin Pratt, served as acting mayor.

Norquist's term was marked by public conflicts with other city leaders, including Bo Black, former head of Summerfest; Arthur Jones, his one-time bodyguard who became chief of police; and Bradley DeBraska, head of the police union. Despite some conflict, Norquist's legacy in Milwaukee included a decline in poverty, a boom in downtown housing, and reforms in both education and welfare.

== Post mayoral career ==
At the beginning of 2004, Norquist began working full-time as the head of the Congress for the New Urbanism, an urban planning and development reform organization based in Chicago, Illinois. He left CNU in 2014 after a decade with the organization. During his tenure, he spoke often and eloquently about the regulatory obstacles that continue to get in the way of good urbanism. Building on his experience taking down the Park East Freeway in Milwaukee, he championed a national CNU campaign that has helped advocates and local officials in their own highway teardown movements. Norquist is now the John M DeGrove Fellow at Florida Atlantic University and adjunct professor at DePaul University Real Estate Program.

== Personal life and family ==
John Norquist is a son of Rev. Ernest O. Norquist and his wife Jeannette Norquist. He is of Swedish descent.

He is married to Susan Mudd and has one son, Benjamin, and one daughter, Katherine. Susan is the descendant of Samuel Mudd, the doctor who treated President Abraham Lincoln's assassin, John Wilkes Booth.

== Electoral history ==
=== Wisconsin Assembly (1974, 1976, 1978, 1980) ===
Year	Election	Date	Elected				Defeated				Total	Plurality
1974	Primary	Sep. 10	John Norquist	Democratic	3,243	55.97%	Earl Keegan Jr. (inc)	Dem.	2,551	44.03%	5,794	692
1974	General	Nov. 5	John Norquist	Democratic	8,704	100.0%					8,704	8,704
1976	General	Nov. 2	John Norquist (inc)	Democratic	13,499	79.25%	Shirley F. Bissett	Rep.	3,534	20.75%	17,033	9,965
1978	Primary	Sep. 12	John Norquist (inc)	Democratic	3,590	75.37%	Raymond J. Borkowski	Dem.	1,173	24.63%	4,763	2,417
1978	General	Nov. 7	John Norquist (inc)	Democratic	10,327	80.50%	Richard W. Croke	Rep.	2,501	19.50%	12,828	7,826
1980	General	Nov. 4	John Norquist (inc)	Democratic	13,297	100.0%					13,297	13,297

=== Wisconsin Senate (1982, 1986) ===
Year	Election	Date	Elected				Defeated				Total	Plurality
1982	Primary	Sep. 14	John Norquist	Democratic	11,281	73.00%	Maria Flores	Dem.	4,172	27.00%	15,453	7,109
1982	General	Nov. 2	John Norquist	Democratic	25,921	100.0%					25,921	25,921
1986	General	Nov. 4	John Norquist (inc)	Democratic	23,860	100.0%					23,860	23,860

=== Milwaukee Mayor (1988, 1992, 1996, 2000) ===
Year	Election	Date	Elected				Defeated				Total	Plurality
1988	Primary	Feb. 16	Martin J. Schreiber	Democratic	44,984	45.24%	John Norquist	Dem.	40,575	40.81%	99,427	4,409
1988	Primary	Feb. 16	Martin J. Schreiber	Democratic	44,984	45.24%	Lee Holloway	Non.	7,885	7.93%	99,427	4,409
1988	Primary	Feb. 16	Martin J. Schreiber	Democratic	44,984	45.24%	Donna Horowitz	Non.	5,983	6.02%	99,427	4,409
1988	Primary	Feb. 16	Martin J. Schreiber	Democratic	44,984	45.24%	Willie G. Lovelace	Non.		<1%	99,427	4,409
1988	Primary	Feb. 16	Martin J. Schreiber	Democratic	44,984	45.24%	Kevin J. Robinson	Non.		<1%	99,427	4,409
1988	Primary	Feb. 16	Martin J. Schreiber	Democratic	44,984	45.24%	Sandra Sherman	Non.		<1%	99,427	4,409
1988	General	Apr. 5	John Norquist	Democratic	112,902	54.64%	Martin J. Schreiber	Dem.	93,738	45.36%	206,640	19,164
1992	Primary	Feb. 18	John Norquist (inc)	Democratic	49,180	49.31%	Gregory Gracz	Non.	36,444	36.54%	99,710	12,736
1992	Primary	Feb. 18	John Norquist (inc)	Democratic	49,180	49.31%	Michael McGee Jr.	Non.	7,082	7.10%	99,710	12,736
1992	Primary	Feb. 18	John Norquist (inc)	Democratic	49,180	49.31%	Ira Robins	Non.	4,790	4.80%	99,710	12,736
1992	Primary	Feb. 18	John Norquist (inc)	Democratic	49,180	49.31%	Willie G. Lovelace	Non.	1,266	1.27%	99,710	12,736
1992	Primary	Feb. 18	John Norquist (inc)	Democratic	49,180	49.31%	David Hall	Non.	978	0.98%	99,710	12,736
1992	General	Apr. 7	John Norquist (inc)	Democratic	77,714	63.04%	Gregory Gracz	Non.	45,563	36.96%	123,277	32,151
1996	General	Mar. 19	John Norquist (inc)	Democratic	82,148	59.91%	Richard Artison	Non.	54,972	40.09%	137,120	27,176
2000	Primary	Feb. 15	John Norquist (inc)	Democratic	21,674	51.94%	George Watts	Non.	12,432	29.79%	41,730	9,242
2000	Primary	Feb. 15	John Norquist (inc)	Democratic	21,674	51.94%	Wendell Harris	Non.	7,624	18.27%	41,730	9,242
2000	General	Apr. 4	John Norquist (inc)	Democratic	52,847	55.96%	George Watts	Non.	41,582	44.04%	94,429	11,265

== Published works ==
- Norquist, John O. (1998). The Wealth of Cities. Basic Books. ISBN 0-7382-0134-0.

== Awards ==
- Edmund N. Bacon Prize, Ed Bacon Foundation (now under the Philadelphia Center for Architecture), 2008

Wisconsin State Assembly
Preceded by Earl Keegan Jr.	Member of the Wisconsin State Assembly from the 8th district January 6, 1975 – January 3, 1983	Succeeded by Lois Plous
Wisconsin Senate
Preceded by Jerry Kleczka	Member of the Wisconsin Senate from the 3rd district January 3, 1983 – April 15, 1988	Succeeded by Brian Burke
Political offices
Preceded by Henry W. Maier	Mayor of Milwaukee; April 18, 1988 – January 1, 2004	Succeeded by Marvin Pratt (acting)
