= 1956 United States Senate election in Wisconsin =

- November 6, 1956
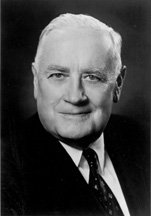

Nominee	Alexander Wiley	Henry Maier
Party	Republican	Democratic
Popular vote	892,473	627,903
Percentage	58.59%	41.22%
- County results Wiley: 50–60% 60–70% 70–80% Maier: 50–60%
U.S. senator before election
Alexander Wiley
Republican
Elected U.S. Senator
Alexander Wiley
Republican

The 1956 United States Senate election in Wisconsin was held on November 6, 1956. Incumbent Republican U.S. Senator Alexander Wiley was re-elected to a fourth term in office. He survived a close primary challenge from U.S. Representative Glenn R. Davis before defeating Henry Maier in the general election. This election marks the last Senate election in Wisconsin to date in which the Republican candidate won Milwaukee County.

== Republican primary ==
=== Candidates ===
- Howard H. Boyle
- Glenn R. Davis, U.S. Representative from Waukesha
- Alexander Wiley, incumbent U.S. Senator since 1939

=== Results ===
1956 U.S. Senate Republican primary
Party	Candidate	Votes	%
Republican	Alexander Wiley (incumbent)	221,042	48.92%
Republican	Glenn R. Davis	211,016	46.70%
Republican	Howard H. Boyle	19,826	4.39%
Total votes		451,884	100.00%

== General election ==
=== Candidates ===
- Henry Maier, State Senator from Milwaukee (Democratic)
- Alexander Wiley, incumbent U.S. Senator since 1939 (Republican)
- Walter Semrau (Independent)

=== Results ===
1956 U.S. Senate election in Wisconsin
Party	Candidate	Votes	%	±%
Republican	Alexander Wiley (incumbent)	892,473	58.59%	
Democratic	Henry Maier	627,903	41.22%	
Independent	Walter Semrau	2,745	0.18%	
Republican hold		Swing		

== See also ==
- 1956 United States Senate elections
