= 1992 Milwaukee mayoral election =

- April 7, 1992

Candidate	John Norquist	Gregory Gracz
Popular vote	99,937	57,078
Percentage	63.64%	36.35%
Mayor before election
John Norquist
Elected mayor
John Norquist

The 1992 Milwaukee mayoral election was held on April 7, 1992, to elect the mayor of Milwaukee. Incumbent mayor John Norquist was re-elected to a second term in office. After facing several candidates in the nonpartisan primary held on February 15, Norquist and Gregory Gracz (head of the city's firefighters union) advanced to the general election (having been the top two vote getters in the primary). Norquist won the general election.

== Background ==
Incumbent mayor John Norquist had first been elected in 1988. His 1988 candidacy was boosted by support from a coalition of liberal-leaning white voters and black voters. Norquist was generally described to be a political progressive on maters such as transit, employment policies, and environmentalism; as well as a believer in new urbanism. However, he also held certain positions that departed from the city's prior liberal orthodoxy, including his stances in support of ending welfare and cutting the city's budget.

The election coincided with other local elections, as well as the Democratic and the Republican Wisconsin presidential primaries.

== Candidates ==
=== Advanced to general election ===
- Gregory Gracz, president of the city's fighter union
- John Norquist, incumbent mayor since 1988

=== Eliminated in primary ===
- Willie Lovelace, dry cleaning service businessman
- David Hall, employee at Briggs & Stratton
- Michael McGee Jr., son of Alderman Michael McGee Sr.
- Ira Robins, private investigator known in part for his private investigative work regarding Laurie Bembenek

== Nonpartisan primary ==
=== Primary campaign ===
In January 1992, Norquist vetoed funding that the Milwaukee Common Council for cultural festivals due to the inclusion of $5,000 of funding for the Milwaukee Gay/Lesbian Pride Parade (which included PrideFest). 1992 was the first year in which the Common Council had opted to fund the city's pride parade. Norquist argued that while he supported gay rights, he objected to the city funding the parade because, "parades and festivals are meant to be non-controversial," characterizing gay pride as politically controversial. He faced criticism from advocates for the event, including some accusations that he had vetoed the funding in a bid for greater support in his mayoral re-election. One member of the Milwaukee Lesbian/Gay Pride Committee alleged that years earlier, he had contrarily encouraged the organization to seek city funding for its parade. Members of the Common Council sought to override the veto, but failed to secure enough members' votes to do.

While Gracz ultimately received approximately 37 percent of votes cast in the primary, a poll conducted conducted in February showed few in the city electorate had formed an opinion on him. Only 11% of respondents had a positive opinion on him, and only 5% had a negative opinion. Voters, by contrast were opinionated about the incumbent mayor, with 62% approving and 28% disapproving in the same poll.

McGee's father, an alderman, generated headlines ahead of the 1992 city elections by leveling threats of unrest violence against other residents if the conditions for racial minorities in the city did not improve. Characterized as a radical, his father further threatened possible urban guerrilla violence if he lost his own bid for aldermanic re-election, but ultimately lost his own campaign for aldermanic re-election in the April general elections. The boundaries of his seat had been vastly altered in the redirecting that followed the 1990 census, and his opponent (black police sergeant George Butler), had been endorsed by Mayor Norquist.

=== Primary results ===
Primary result
Candidate	Votes	%
John Norquist (incumbent)	49,180	49.31
Gregory Gracz	36,444	36.47
Michael McGee Jr.	7,082	10.00
Ira Robins	4,790	4.80
Willie Lovelace	1,266	1.27
David Hall	978	0.98

== General election ==
=== General election campaign ===
Gracz saw his campaign fall apart after it leaked in March that a female firefighter had accused him of sexual harassment, claiming he exposed his penis to her without her consent during a firefighters convention in 1990. Her claims noted specific recollection of an alleged distinctive mole. Gracz denied the allegation, and has continued to in the decades since. Gracz asserted that the allegation against him was not only untrue, but was being raised against him as political retaliation. He threatened to sue for defamation, but never did (claiming, after the election, that it would be too time-consuming and take a toll on his family for him to litigate the allegations in court). He requested that a John Doe investigation (an inquiry overseen by an elected judge) be held, and the attorney of his accuser indicated that the accuser would have no objections to cooperating with such an investigation. However, none materialized.

=== General election polling ===
In March (after the scandal broke against Gracz) a newspaper-sponsored opinion poll had Norquist leading 69% to 21%. Favorability of Gracz stood at 21%, while unfavorability stood at 37%. Favorability of Norquist stood at 67% and unfavorability stood at 23%. 43% of voters were undecided on whether they believed the allegations against Gracz, while 36% believed them and 21% accepted his denials of the allegations.

=== General election results ===
General election result
Candidate	Votes	%
John Norquist (incumbent)	99,937	63.64
Gregory Gracz	57,078	36.35
