= Earl Keegan Jr. =

American politician

Member of the Wisconsin State Assembly from the 8th district
- In office January 1, 1973 – January 6, 1975
- Preceded by: District Created
- Succeeded by: John Norquist

Milwaukee County Supervisor
- In office 1956–1968

Personal details
- Born: December 10, 1921 Milwaukee, Wisconsin, US
- Died: February 11, 1977 (aged 55)
- Party: Democratic

Earl Keegan Jr. (December 10, 1921 – February 11, 1977) was an American politician who was a member of the Wisconsin State Assembly.

== Biography ==
Keegan was born on December 10, 1921, in Milwaukee, Wisconsin. After graduating from St. John's Cathedral High School, Keegan attended Marquette University. During World War II, he served in the United States Army. He became a member of the Veterans of Foreign Wars, the American Legion and AMVETS, as well as the Society of the Holy Name. Keegan died February 11, 1977.

== Political career ==
Keegan was elected to the Assembly in 1972, where he served the 8th district until 1975. Previously, he was Supervisor of Milwaukee County, Wisconsin from 1956 to 1968. He was a Democrat.
