= 1988 Milwaukee mayoral election =

- April 5, 1988

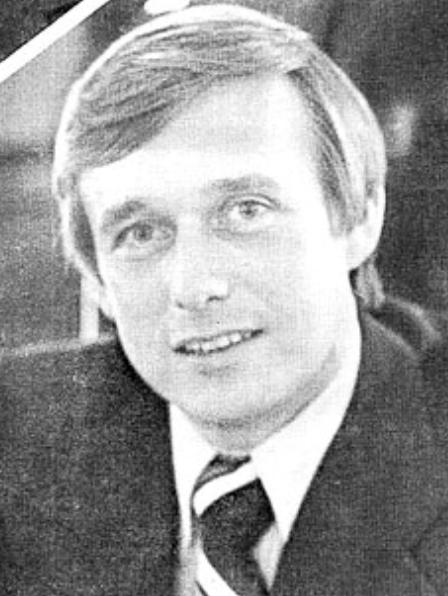
Candidate	John Norquist	Martin J. Schreiber
Popular vote	112,902	93,738
Percentage	54.64%	45.36%
Mayor before election
Henry Maier
Elected mayor
John Norquist

The 1988 Milwaukee mayoral election was held in April 1988, to elect the mayor of Milwaukee. State Senator John Norquist was elected to succeed outgoing mayor Henry Maier. Norquist defeated Martin J. Schreiber (the former lieutenant governor and acting governor of Wisconsin) in the general election. Six other candidates (including Lee Holloway) were eliminated in the nonpartisan primary. Dennis Conta (former Wisconsin secretary of revenue) withdrew from the race before the primary took place.

== Background ==
Incumbent mayor Henry Maier had held the office since being elected in 1960. He opted to forgo re-election in 1988 and to retire from the mayoralty at the age of 70. He cited his belief that he had grown too old to seek another term.

The election coincided with county elections, including the election for Milwaukee County Executive (which was won by Dave Schulz in a landslide). The general election coincided with the Wisconsin Democratic presidential primary and the Wisconsin Republican presidential primary.

While the election itself was non-partisan, both of the candidates in the general election were Democrats, as was the outgoing mayor.

== Candidates ==
=== Advanced to general election ===
- John Norquist, state senator
- Martin J. Schreiber, former acting governor, former lieutenant governor, former state senator

=== Eliminated in primary ===
- Lee Holloway
- Willie G. Lovelace
- Donna Horowitz Richards, 1984 mayoral runner-up, teacher, youth worker
- Kevin J. Robinson
- Sandra Sherman, garment worker

=== Withdrew ===
- Dennis Conta, former Wisconsin secretary of revenue and former state assemblyman

== Campaign ==
After the early withdrawal of Conta in February, local journalist Bruce Murphy opined, "[Conta's] withdrawal turns this into a two-man race lasting more than five months, and I don’t think Schreiber...can stand up to the scrutiny of the electorate for half a year."

Norquist's candidacy was boosted by support from a coalition of liberal-leaning white voters and black voters. Among the black voters who Norquist courted were many whom the Chicago Tribune described as belonging to Milwaukee's black "Intelligentsia". Schulz's coalition was described as predominantly middle class in its socio-economic character. This differed from incumbent mayor Maier's coalition, which had been predominantly blue collar. Norquist was generally described to be a political progressive on maters such as transit, employment policies, and environmentalism; as well as a believer in new urbanism. However, he also held certain positions that departed from the city's prior liberal orthodoxy and were more commonly of conservatives, including his stances in support of ending welfare and cutting the city's budget. Norquist's campaign platform emphasized taking new approaches, bringing jobs to the city, and fostering greater unity between the city's disjointed north and south sides. One description given to his views at the time of the 1988 election was "conservative socialist".

After Milwaukee County Parks Director Dave Schulz endorsed Noquist's campaign in late 1987, he was fired by Milwaukee County Executive William O'Donnell. Schulz then launched an ultimately successful campaign to unseat O'Donnell in the coinciding county executive election.

State Senator Barbara Ulichney served as Norquist's campaign treasurer.

Outgoing mayor Maier did not make an endorsement of a preferred successor. The general election between Norquist and Schreiber was hard fought, but Norquist won by a sizable margin of victory.

Norquist was regarded to be the candidate that more challenged the city's existing political establishment, while Schreiber was regarded as the candidate who was seen as friendlier to the establishment.

== Polls ==
Early on, initial polling had showed the race favoring Schreiber. Norquist was well behind him in early polls.

Polls conducted in the weeks before the primary showed the field dominated by Schreibrer and Norquist. Schreiber held a consistent lead over Norquist in polls, but that lead narrowed as the election neared.

Polls conducted ahead of the general election indicated a close race. The weekend prior to the election, the Milwaukee Journal released a poll showing Norquist leading by only four points, with 24% of voters remaining undecided.

== Campaign spending ==
The election was the most expensive in Milwaukee's history up to that time, with the two general election candidates spending a combined $1 million. This total exceeded the statewide campaign spending of any pair of Democratic presidential primary contenders. Norquist's campaign spent $800,000, while Schreiber's spent $500,000.

== Results ==
=== Primary results ===
The primary saw 25% turnout among registered voters.

Primary result
Candidate	Votes	%
Martin J. Schreiber	44,984	44
John Norquist	40,575	40
Lee Holloway	7,886	8
Donna Horowitz Richards	5,983	6
Willie Lovelace		<1
Kevin J. Robinson		<1
Sandra Sherman		<1

Schreiber's lead in the primary was lower than what he had anticipated receiving above Norquist. In his remarks on the night of the primary, Schreiber noted that he had been out-spent by Norquist and promised his campaign would win votes in the general election, "the old fashioned way –we're going to earn it."

=== General election results ===
complete, unofficial returns:

General election result
Candidate	Votes	%
John Norquist	112,902	55
Martin J. Schreiber	93,738	45

Exit polls indicated that Norquist received 59% of the city's black vote, while Schreiber received 41%. The city's population at the time was one-fifth black.
