= Chris Abele =

American businessman and politician

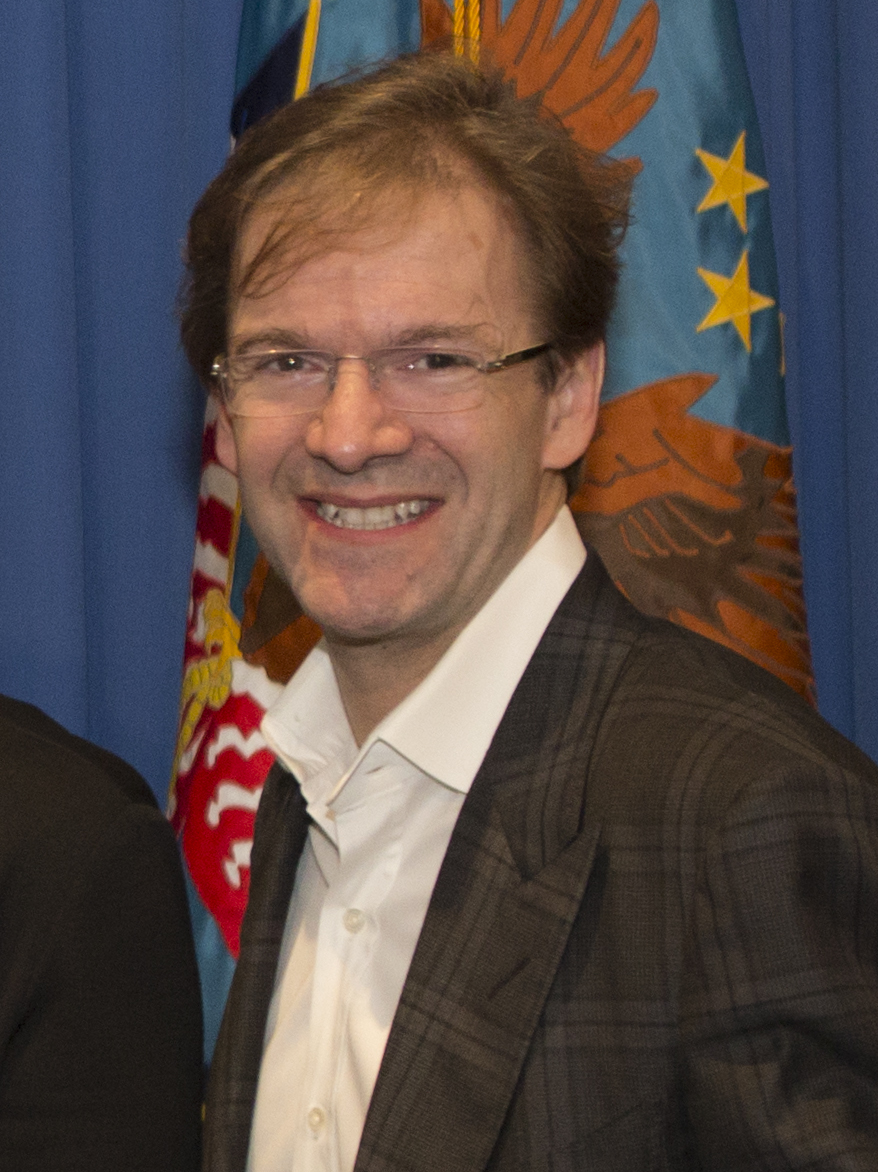
- Abele in 2015

6th County Executive of Milwaukee County
- In office April 25, 2011 – May 4, 2020
- Preceded by: Marvin Pratt (acting)
- Succeeded by: David Crowley

Personal details
- Born: Christopher Seton Abele; January 28, 1967 (age 59) Concord, Massachusetts, U.S.
- Party: Democratic
- Spouse: Jennifer Gonda
- Children: 3
- Parent: John Abele (father)
- Education: Bennington College; Lawrence University

Christopher Seton Abele (born January 28, 1967) is an American businessman who served as the 6th executive of Milwaukee County from 2011 to 2020.

== Early life and education ==
Abele is the son of American businessman John Abele, the co-founder of Boston Scientific. He grew up in Concord, Massachusetts, and moved to Wisconsin to attend college at Lawrence University in Appleton, Wisconsin, from 1991 to 1995. After, he decided to move to Milwaukee.

== Business career ==
In 1996, Abele, with Chris Kerr, founded SteriLogic Waste Systems, which serves hospitals and medical clinics in managing sharps waste. Abele was CEO of SteriLogic from 1996 to 2004. In 2004, Abele became Chairman of the company to devote more time to philanthropic efforts. In 2006, SteriLogic merged with Medsolutions and in 2007, Kerr and Abele sold the majority of SteriLogic to Stericycle. The remainder of SteriLogic was restructured the remainder as Oxus Environmental.

In 2001, Abele and his business partner Steve Mech founded CSA Commercial, a Milwaukee-based real estate and development company.

Prior to his election as Milwaukee County executive, Abele was CEO of the Argosy Foundation. In 2011, Abele stepped down as CEO and was replaced by his sister, Jeneye. Abele remains a trustee of the foundation.

Abele invested $10 million into a venture fund, CSA Partners LLC, for Milwaukee start-ups. The LLC was formed with Brian Taffora and Pat Farley. They invested into gener8tor's Fund II and opened Ward 4 (Milwaukee, WI startup accelerator space) in remodelled space inside the former John Pritzlaff Hardware Company Building.

== Milwaukee County executive (2011–2020) ==
=== Elections ===
On January 4, 2011, Abele formally announced that he entered the race for Milwaukee County Executive. Abele and Stone received the most votes and advanced on to a run-off election that was held on April 5, 2011. On April 6, 2011, Abele defeated Republican challenger Jeff Stone, and was sworn in on April 21, 2011.

Abele contributed primarily to Democratic campaigns and the Democratic Party. Formerly, Abele was on a number of finance committees. This included the 2002 campaign for former Governor Jim Doyle, where he helped with John Kerry's presidential fundraising, and donated to Barack Obama's 2008 presidential campaign. The Milwaukee Journal Sentinel's Daniel Bice reported that Abele donated to the campaigns of Republican state legislators including Joe Sanfelippo and Dale Kooyenga, both of whom have played roles in the passage of bills that have increased Abele's power as Milwaukee County executive.

On February 12, 2011, Abele received the endorsement of the Milwaukee Journal Sentinel, which stated "Chris Abele's leadership on nonprofit boards, his experience running two family companies and his skill managing the Argosy Foundation make him a solid choice for county executive", and "Abele has the right experience and the right vision. Abele could be a game-changer". On April 2, 2011, the Milwaukee Journal Sentinel once again endorsed Abele over Jeff Stone, stating "Milwaukee County needs transformative change. One candidate provides the better chance to accomplish that."

=== Tenure ===
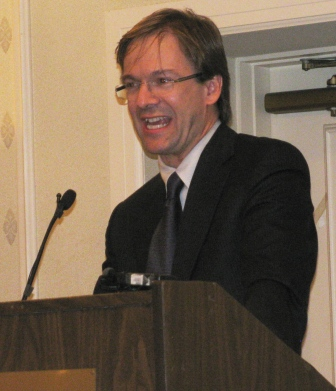
Abele in 2012

Abele took the oath of office to become Milwaukee County Executive on April 25, 2011, succeeding Interim County Executive Marvin Pratt.

On June 9, 2011, citing concerns about budget cuts at the state level, Abele indicated his opposition to a planned $775,000 investment in public art at the Milwaukee County Courthouse. A year later, in June 2012, Abele signed a resolution placing the public art program on "hiatus" and authorizing use of the program's $500,000 in accumulated funds toward deferred maintenance instead of artwork.

On June 10, 2011, he announced his intention to provide health care coverage to domestic partners of Milwaukee County employees. This was approved by the County Board on July 28, 2011, and signed into law by Abele on August 3, 2011. Abele declined to seek re-election in 2020.

== Personal life ==
Abele is previously divorced and has three children. He was included in the Milwaukee Business Journal "40 under 40" and "Power Broker" lists in 2000 and 2010, respectively. He is a member of the Board of Governors for the Boys & Girls Clubs of America, Inc., a Trustee for Milwaukee Institute of Art & Design, and the chairman for Milwaukee Symphony Orchestra. Abele is also a trustee of the Argosy Foundation, a charitable trust established with an endowment from his father.

== Electoral history ==
Milwaukee County Executive Special Election, 2011
Party	Candidate	Votes	%	±%
Primary Election, February 15, 2011
Nonpartisan	Jeff Stone	42,113	42.88%	
Nonpartisan	Chris Abele	24,884	25.34%	
Nonpartisan	Jim Sullivan	21,266	21.65%	
Nonpartisan	Lee Holloway	8,287	8.44%	
Nonpartisan	Ieshuh Griffin	1,520	1.55%	
	Scattering	141	0.14%	
Total votes		98,211	100.0%	
General Election, April 5, 2011
Nonpartisan	Chris Abele	134,848	60.53%	
Nonpartisan	Jeff Stone	87,913	39.47%	
Plurality		46,935	21.70%	
Total votes		222,761	100.0%	

Milwaukee County Executive Election, 2012
Party	Candidate	Votes	%	±%
General Election, April 3, 2012
Nonpartisan	Chris Abele (incumbent)	93,621	95.33%	
	Scattering	4,583	4.67%	
Plurality		89,038	90.67%	
Total votes		98,204	100.0%	

Milwaukee County Executive Election, 2016
Party	Candidate	Votes	%	±%
Primary Election, February 16, 2016
Nonpartisan	Chris Larson	48,631	44.82%	
Nonpartisan	Chris Abele (incumbent)	47,993	44.23%	
Nonpartisan	Steve Hogan	6,596	6.08%	
Nonpartisan	Joseph Thomas Klein	4,734	4.36%	
	Scattering	551	0.51%	
Total votes		108,505	100.0%	
General Election, April 5, 2016
Nonpartisan	Chris Abele (incumbent)	156,509	55.34%	
Nonpartisan	Chris Larson	125,240	39.47%	
Nonpartisan	Joseph Thomas Klein	11	0.00%	
	Scattering	1,061	0.38%	
Plurality		31,269	11.06%	
Total votes		282,821	100.0%	

Political offices
Preceded by Marvin Pratt (interim)	County Executive of Milwaukee County, Wisconsin; 2011 – 2020	Succeeded by David Crowley
