= BrightStar Wisconsin Foundation =

BrightStar Wisconsin Foundation Inc.
- Formation: 2014
- Headquarters: Milwaukee, Wisconsin, United States
- Key people: Thomas M. Shannon (President & CEO); Jeff Harris (Board Chairman)
- Revenue: $1,350,235 (2015)
- Expenses: $419,714 (2015)
- Website: www.brightstarwi.org

BrightStar Wisconsin Foundation Inc. is a Milwaukee, Wisconsin based non-profit that was formed by angel investor Tom Shannon and seven additional founding donors. It is a means of economic development by members of the state's private sector. "BrightStar was formed for the purpose of assisting WEDC in its mission to create family-sustaining jobs in the Wisconsin."

== History ==
The foundation began by each of the eight original donors pledging 500,000 dollars to seed a fund for a total of 6 million dollars. The foundation also seeks tax deductible donations from wealthy individuals, foundations, and corporations willing to take the risk. The foundation reinvests in state companies all earnings and returns from its portfolio. Donors will not receive returns on their contributions.

== See also ==
- Ward4
- Wisconsin Economic Development Corporation
- Wisconsin Investment Partners
