= CSA Partners =

American venture capital firm

- Type: Private
- Industry: Venture capital
- Headquarters: Milwaukee, Wisconsin, U.S.
- Area served: North America
- Key people: Managing Directors: Chris Abele; Pat Farley; Steve Mech; Brian Taffora
- Website: www.csapartners.com

CSA Partners is a Milwaukee, Wisconsin–based venture capital firm founded in 2013 by Milwaukee County Executive Chris Abele, who committed at least US$10 million of his own capital to invest in early-stage companies in Wisconsin and the broader Midwest. The firm leases 35,000 square feet at remodelled space inside the historic John Pritzlaff Hardware Company building.

CSA Partners hosts the monthly "1 Million Cups" start up showcase.

== History ==
CSA Partners was launched in 2013. In 2013–2014, statewide venture reporting listed CSA Partners with US$10 million in committed capital among Wisconsin investment groups. The firm’s first disclosed deal was leading a US$550,000 round in Scanalytics in October 2013, followed by continued early-stage activity aimed at technology-enabled startups.

== Investments ==
CSA Partners’ first investment led Scanalytics’ US$550,000 round in 2013. In April 2014 the firm participated as a new investor in Madison-based food-ordering company EatStreet’s US$6 million Series B financing. In August 2015 the fund led a US$2 million seed round for Milwaukee-relocated Bright Cellars, a subscription wine retailer that had joined the local ecosystem after participating in gener8tor.

== See also ==
- Gener8tor
- Ward 4 (Milwaukee, WI startup accelerator space)
