= Henry Maier =

20th century American politician

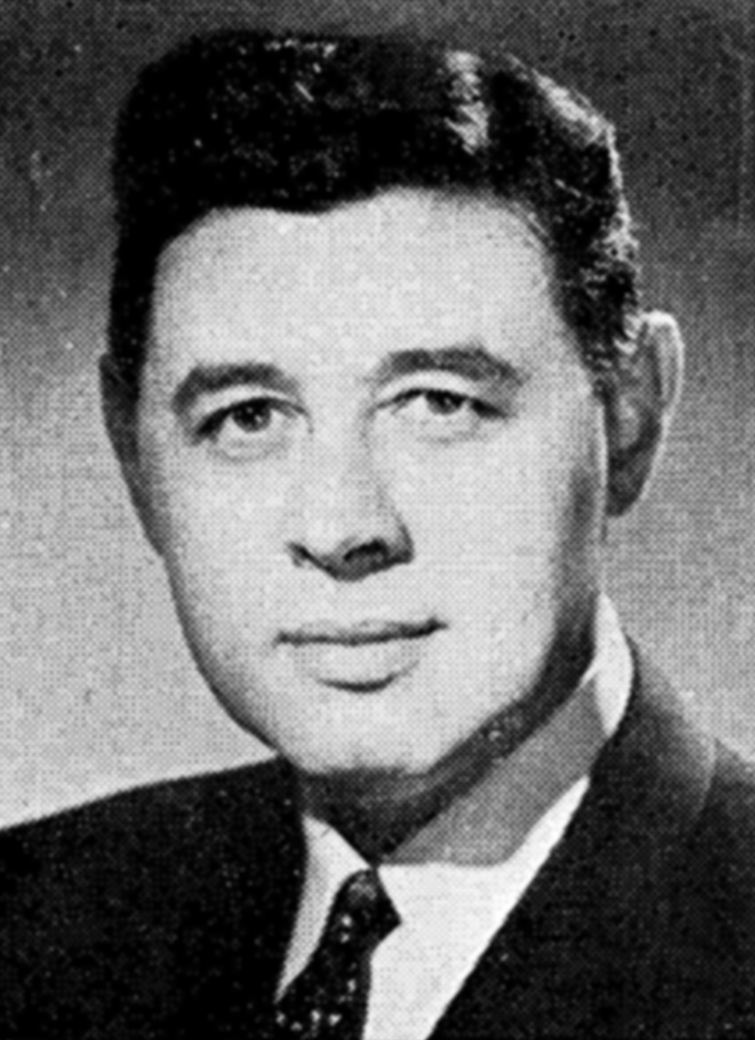
- Maier, circa 1958

42nd Mayor of Milwaukee
- In office April 18, 1960 – April 18, 1988
- Preceded by: Frank Zeidler
- Succeeded by: John Norquist

24th President of the United States Conference of Mayors
- In office 1971–1972
- Preceded by: James Tate
- Succeeded by: Louie Welch

39th President of the National League of Cities
- In office 1965
- Preceded by: John F. Collins
- Succeeded by: Jerome Cavanagh

Member of the Wisconsin Senate from the 9th district
- In office January 1, 1951 – April 18, 1960
- Preceded by: Robert Emmet Tehan
- Succeeded by: Norman Sussman

Personal details
- Born: Henry Walter David Nelke; February 7, 1918 Dayton, Ohio, U.S.
- Died: July 17, 1994 (aged 76) Delafield, Wisconsin, U.S.
- Party: Democratic
- Education: University of Wisconsin, Madison (BA); University of Wisconsin, Milwaukee (MA)

Military service
- Allegiance: United States
- Branch/service: United States Navy
- Battles/wars: World War II

Henry Walter Maier (February 7, 1918 – July 17, 1994) was an American politician and the longest-serving mayor of Milwaukee, Wisconsin, holding office from 1960 to 1988. A Democrat, Maier was a powerful and controversial figure, presiding over an era of economic and political turbulence for the city of Milwaukee.

== Early life ==
Maier was born Henry Walter David Nelke in Dayton, Ohio. After his father died, he moved with his mother to Springfield, Ohio to live with his maternal grandparents. He graduated from Springfield High School in 1936. When his mother moved to Milwaukee and married contractor Charles Maier, Nelke accompanied her. He changed his name to Henry Walter Maier in 1938.

He graduated with a bachelor's degree from the University of Wisconsin–Madison in 1940. That same year, he became involved in politics by supporting the 1940 presidential candidacy of Republican nominee Wendell Willkie.

Maier served in the United States Navy during World War II. He earned a master's degree from University of Wisconsin–Milwaukee. He worked briefly as an agent in the insurance industry, and taught workers' compensation and general liability insurance at the University of Wisconsin–Milwaukee.

In the late 1940s Maier politically affiliated himself with the Democratic Party, and again became politically involved. In 1948, he unsuccessfully ran for mayor of Milwaukee, finishing sixth in the election, being in the lower half of finishers in a crowded mayoral field that year.

== Wisconsin Senate (1950–1960) ==
Maier, circa 1952

Maier was elected to the Wisconsin State Senate in 1950 as a Democrat. While in the state senate, he was made his party's floor leader.

In 1956, he unsuccessfully ran for United States Senate.

== Mayoralty (1960–1988) ==
In 1960, Maier was elected Milwaukee's mayor, defeating Congressman Henry Reuss in a race to succeed the retiring Frank Zeidler (who had been the last of Milwaukee's Socialist mayors).

Maier remained in office for 28 years, being succeeded by John Norquist after retiring in 1988. He was the longest-serving mayor in Milwaukee history.

Maier was regarded to be a "technocrat", praised for his re-organization of city departments to improve government efficiency. He was also noted for his success at attracting state and federal funding to the city. Criticism has been given to his handling of racial issues. A 1993 survey of historians, political scientists and urban experts conducted by Melvin G. Holli of the University of Illinois at Chicago ranked Maier as the fourteenth-best American big-city mayor to have served between the years 1820 and 1993.

In its obituary for Maier, the Chicago Tribune reflected, "Maier began his mayoral reign during a period of urban transition and turbulence. Milwaukee was spared neither."

In 1987, local journalist Bruce Murphy characterized Maier as, "one of the first American politicians to call for a reordering of national priorities to confront urban problems."

=== Re-elections ===
Across his seven successful mayoral elections, Maier averaged 70% of the vote. None of his re-elections saw his incumbency face a serious threat. Maier won re-election to a second term in 1964.

In 1968, Maier was re-elected to his third term by the largest margin in the city's history. He received 86% of the vote in 1968 and led in every ward of the city.

Maier was further re-elected in 1972, 1976, 1980, and 1984. His 1984 re-election to a seventh consecutive term allowed him to surpass the record for longest Milwaukee mayoral tenure previously held by Daniel Hoan. By then, the 66-year-old Maier was also the "dean" (longest tenured) of incumbent big city mayors in the United States. At the time the longest-tenured incumbent mayor in any of any of the top 20 most populous United States cities, he had been in office eleven years longer than the next-longest tenured incumbent (Baltimore mayor William Donald Schaefer).

=== Racial matters ===
Maier's opposition to demands of Civil Rights Movement organizers caused constant friction with his administration and Milwaukee's non-white residents. Many of the civil rights protests in Milwaukee were headed by Rev. James Groppi, a Milwaukee-based Roman Catholic priest. Maier and Groppi were lastingly at-odds, with Maiers 1990s autobiography exclaiming that he would have been sooner to forgive Senator Joseph McCarthy for his Red Scare hunts for communists than he would have been willing to forgive Rev. Groppi for his actions.

During his second term, the city saw the 1967 Milwaukee riot, a response by the African-American community to a host of issues including housing discrimination and police brutality. In response to the riot, Maier declared a state of emergency, enforced a curfew, and asked-in the National Guard. While many residents offered plaudits for his handling of the riots (considering him to have acted decisively), many civil rights activists criticized his response and overall handling of racial matters. Maier accused Rev. Groppi of inciting the 1967 riots, though Groppi denied this. In a 2017 Milwaukee Magazine article, Matthew Prigge reflected on Maier,

His response to the civil disturbance of 1967 was heavy-handed and failed to fully recognize the plight of black Milwaukeeans. Indeed, his tin ear on racial issues would become the most glaringly negative aspect of his legacy – one he would try to dispute many times. He resisted passing an open housing ordinance, but did so in part because he wanted public housing projects to be located in the suburbs, not just in the "poor man’s land, Polish land" of the city….He was [throughout his mayoralty] the champion of Milwaukee's mostly Polish and German middle class. While similar groups had fled other major cities in droves through the 1960s and 70s, Maier had fought to keep them in Milwaukee. The city saw a far less drastic population decline during his tenure than in most rust belt metropolises. But Milwaukee would also emerge from this period as one of the nation's most segregated cities.

Maier stood in opposition to the prospect of citywide legislation against housing racial housing discrimination. While he laid out a "39 Points" proposal to address racial inequity, it was broadly criticized as impractical. Maier insisted that state and federal solutions needed to be the source of racial problems, and that municipal reform could not resolve them.

=== Re-shaping of municipal government ===
Maier re-organized city government departments in order to improve efficiency. Particularly notable was the merging of separate planning, housing, and redevelopment departments into a single Department of City Development. In 1966, Maier published a book titled Challenge to the Cities, which laid out his views on steps that urban leaders could take to improve their cities through practical budgeting and prioritization.

A major advocate of increased federal and state funding for cities, Maier used some of the federal funding he was able to secure to establish new public housing for elderly residents.

=== Schools and education ===
Maier called for the state of Wisconsin to reshape education funding so that state taxes would fund schools, rather than local property taxes. This change did not materialize.

=== Development, tourism, and festivals ===
Across his mayoralty, Maier promoted efforts to revitalize the city's downtown, to bring increased tourism to the city, and to establish festival events in the city. Considered a "bombastic" showman, Maier often participated in festivals, even performing songs.

Maier is credited as the "Father of Summerfest", with the event being the culmination of his intense promotion of the idea of creating a major festival on the city's lakefront. The event was first hosted in 1968. For the event's second iteration, he wrote lyrics to the Summerfest Polka composition. The mayor envisioned the festival as a global event that could use culture to heal the city's racial division. While it fell short of that lofty goal, the event has continued to be annually held and is perhaps the most visible legacy of his mayoralty.

Maier's hands-on promotion of downtown development included the Shops of Grand Avenue Mall. However, this mall never lived up to initial expectations, and quickly declined after its opening.

=== Leadership of national and state organizations ===
Maier (left) with Boston Mayor John F. Collins (center) and Detroit Mayor Jerome Cavanagh (right) in the 1960s. Collins was his predecessor and Cavanagh was his successor as president of the National League of Cities

In 1965, Maier served as president of the National League of Cities. In 1971 and 1972, Maier served as president of the United States Conference of Mayors.

Circa 1970, Maier became the chief organizer of the newly founded Wisconsin Alliance of Cities.

=== Personality, ideology, and conduct ===
In 2017, Prigge observed,

Maier took a modern approach to running the city, seeing the threat of suburbanization and the need for Milwaukee to remain a clean and well-managed place to live. But his "modern view" failed to change with the times.

A March 1970 article in The Christian Science Monitor opined that, "despite dissatisfaction among some liberals, the Mayor himself is considered one of the major liberal urban politicians in the United States."

Maier faced a number of heavy criticisms for his personality and conduct, particularly during the later years of his mayoralty. In 2001, local journalist Mary Van de Kamp Nohl described Maier as having become "isolated and self-absorbed" by the end of his mayoralty. In a 1985 article, local journalist Charlie Sykes likened him to the character of Captain Queeg in The Caine Mutiny, dubbing him "Mayor Queeg", remarking, "Such pathology…Such paranoiac bitterness…His power has long been essentially negative in nature." In a 1986 article, Sykes criticized Maier for his refusal to be held accountable for problems in the city,

While most chief executives of city governments acknowledge at least some responsibility for basic urban problems, Maier has simply declared that as far as he is concerned, they are … not the responsibility of city government.…By defining his office out of existence, Maier has not only made himself uniquely qualified to fill it, but nigh on indispensable.

In 2017, Prigge recalled that Maier,

Battled with…members of the press, governors, the common council, and nearly anyone with a platform who had unkind words for the mayor. Near the end of his term, he had become so isolated that one assemblyman called him "the Howard Hughes of City Hall."

Maier's fighting with other politicians included long-lasting animosity with Governor Tony Earl.

In the 1980s, Maier criticized decreases championed by President Ronald Reagan to federal funding available to cities, and cautioning that the United States "heading for a new urban crisis".

==== Disputes with news media ====
Maier long feuded with news media, which he disdained and accused of having "kept the pot boiling".

Maier was particularly quarrelsome with the Milwaukee Journal. He accused the Milwaukee Journal of having a suburban-oriented view on municipal matters and being unfairly biased against him. In 1974, his office took issue with Time magazine ranking the Milwaukee Journal as one of the nation's top ten newspapers, positing that the magazine's praise of the newspaper was due to undue criticism of him. Weeks before leaving office, he personally purchased a half-page advertisement in the Milwaukee Sentinel in which he published an open-letter outlining his grievances with the Milwaukee Journal.

Maier's combative attitude towards the press led Mikhail Taratuta (a Soviet Union-based disc jockey) to quip after meeting Maeir on a January 1987 visit to Milwaukee and hearing Maier complain of the local press, "he prefers our system [in the Soviet Union]." In September 1987, local journalist Buce Murphy wrote that, "if Maier felt he'd lost control of a reporter, he would harass him mercilessly."

=== Retirement in 1988 ===
Believing himself to be too old (70-years-old) to seek another term in 1988, Maier retired. At time of his retirement, he was the longest tenured major city mayor in U.S. history.

== Later life, death, and legacy ==
In 1993, Maier published an autobiographical political memoir: The Mayor Who Made Milwaukee Famous. The title was an allusion to the advertising slogan of a Milwaukee brewery, and the book included an author's note that Maier had objected to the title and that it was used at the insistence of his publisher.

In his later years, Maier resided in Delafield, Wisconsin. Maier died of pneumonia at age 76 at his home in Delafield. Henry Maier Festival Park, where Summerfest is held, was named in his honor.

== See also ==
- List of mayors of Milwaukee
- List of longest-serving United States mayors

== Notes ==
Party political offices
| Preceded by Thomas E. Fairchild | Democratic nominee for U.S. Senator from Wisconsin (Class 3); 1956 | Succeeded by Gaylord Nelson |
Wisconsin Senate
| Preceded by Robert Emmet Tehan | Member of the Wisconsin Senate from the 9th district January 1, 1951 – April 1960 | Succeeded by Norman Sussman |
Political offices
| Preceded by Frank Zeidler | Mayor of Milwaukee; 1960–1988 | Succeeded by John Norquist |
