= Jeff Stone (Wisconsin politician) =

American politician (born 1961)

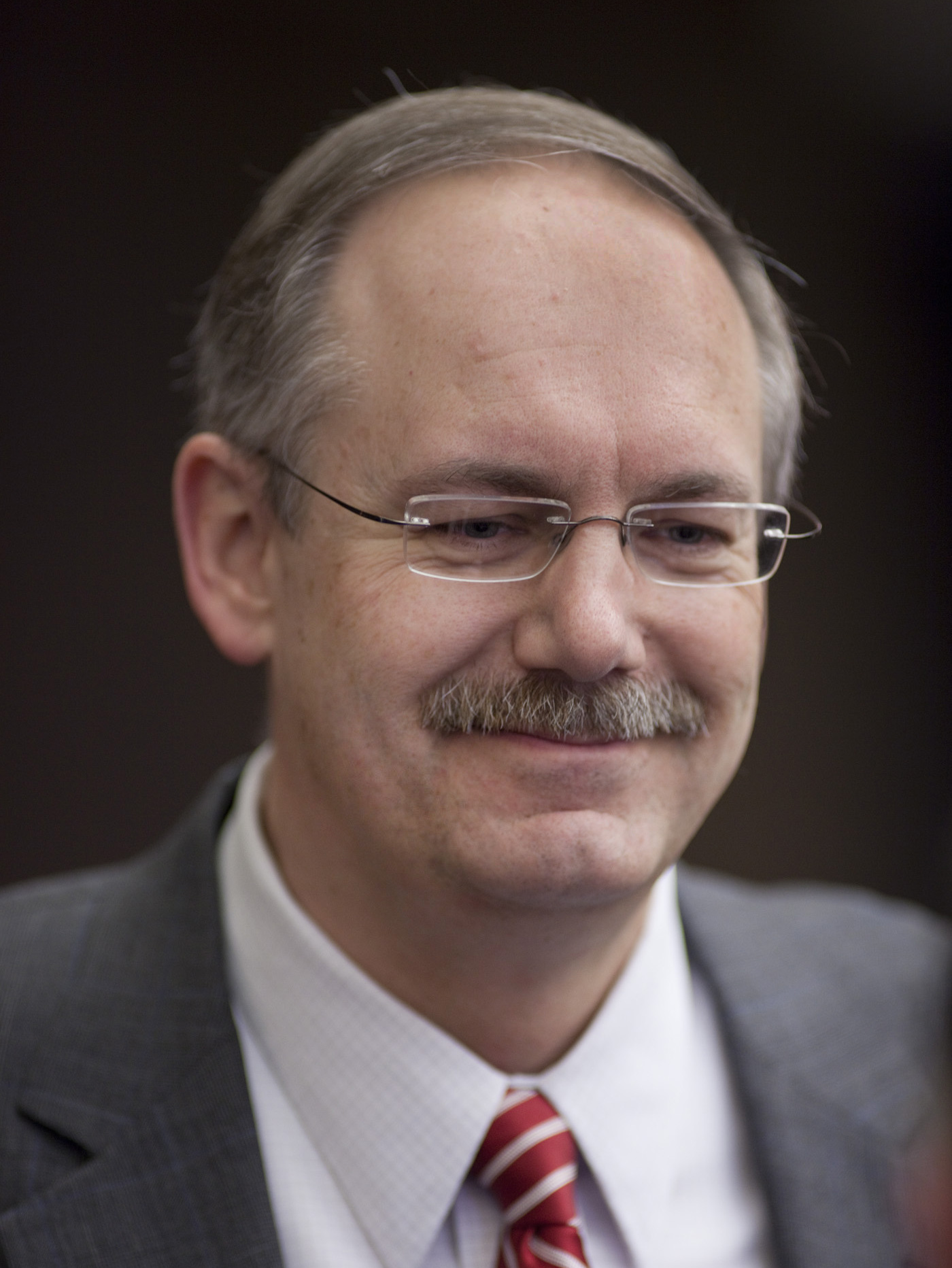
- Stone in 2011

Member of the Wisconsin State Assembly from the 82nd district
- In office April 15, 1998 – October 14, 2013
- Preceded by: James A. Rutkowski
- Succeeded by: Ken Skowronski

Personal details
- Born: January 28, 1961 (age 65) Topeka, Kansas, U.S.
- Party: Republican
- Education: Washburn University

Jeff A. Stone (born January 28, 1961) is an American businessman and former politician. A Republican, he was a member of the Wisconsin State Assembly from 1998 through 2013. He currently serves as chair of the Milwaukee Metropolitan Sewerage District.

== Early life and career ==
Stone was born in Topeka, Kansas. He was raised in Zanesville, Ohio, and graduated from West Muskingum High School before returning to Topeka to attend Washburn University. He graduated from that institution in 1983 with a Bachelor of Arts in political science and history, magna cum laude.

== Legislative career ==
After moving to Wisconsin, Stone served in the city council of Greenfield, Wisconsin, from 1994 to 1998. He was elected to the Wisconsin State Assembly in a special election in 1998. He was reelected seven times.

=== Voter ID ===
In 2005, Stone co-sponsored a voter ID bill with Senator Joe Leibham of Sheboygan. The bill passed the State Assembly and Senate, but was vetoed by Democratic governor Jim Doyle.

In 2011, Stone and Leibham introduced a similar voter ID bill providing more oversight and restrictions than past legislative proposals. Stone stated that his bill will provide people working at the polls with the right tools to know if the person voting is the person they claim to be. Opponents of the bill argue that the law will result in the suppression of votes of minority voters who don't have photo identification. Supporters argued that it would protect against the type of voter fraud allegedly observed in Milwaukee during the 2004 presidential election.

== Later career ==
After the 2010 election, in which Milwaukee County executive Scott Walker was elected governor, Stone announced his candidacy to succeed Walker as county executive. He faced several notable Milwaukeeans in the February 2011 nonpartisan primary, including acting county executive Lee Holloway, former state senator Jim Sullivan, and businessman Chris Abele. Stone came in first in the primary, with 43% of the vote, but was defeated in the April general election by Chris Abele.

On October 14, 2013, Stone resigned from the Wisconsin State Assembly to accept a job as division administrator for Water Compliance and Consumer Affairs at the Wisconsin Public Service Commission.

After leaving public office, he was employed as a senior consultant at Kapur & Associates Consulting Engineers. As of 2024, he is also serving as chair of the Milwaukee Metropolitan Sewerage District.

Stone and his wife Lynn are also co-owners of the Greendale-based company the Printing Factory. As of February 2011, there were no records with the Wisconsin Department of Financial Institutions indicating the existence or corporate standing of the company.

Wisconsin State Assembly
Preceded by James A. Rutkowski	Member of the Wisconsin State Assembly from the 82nd district April 15, 1998 – October 14, 2013	Succeeded by Ken Skowronski
