= Gener8tor =

American startup accelerator

gener8tor
- Industry: Venture Capital
- Founded: June 2012; 14 years ago
- Headquarters: Madison
- Number of locations: 3 (2017) 46 cities (2021)
- Key people: Troy Vosseller, Joe Kirgues, Maggie Brickerman, Abby Kursel
- Brands: gBETA NMotion Motown Accelerator OnRamp Conference Series
- Number of employees: 90+
- Website: Official website

Gener8tor (stylized gener8tor) is an American startup accelerator that operates in several US cities, including Madison, Milwaukee, and Minneapolis.

Since its inception, Gener8tor has invested in 180 companies, which have gone on to raise more than $1 billion in total follow-on financing.

== Program ==
Gener8tor offers $20,000 in exchange for 6–7% of equity and another $80,000 in the form of an uncapped convertible note.

Each class happens in a different city, with Madison in the Spring, Minneapolis in the Summer, and Milwaukee during the Fall. Each class lasts about 3 months.

In its Madison 2017 class, Gener8tor accepted 5 out of 691 companies.

== History ==
Gener8tor's first fund was backed by Dan Armbrust, founder of Granite Microsystems, a Mequon, Wisconsin equipment manufacturer, and Dan Bader, president and CEO of Bader Philanthropies. Gener8tor is a sponsor for Front Row Motorsports driver Todd Gilliland in the NASCAR Cup Series.

== Gener8tor Fund II ==
CSA Partners Venture Management, a venture capital fund backed by Chris Abele, Milwaukee County Executive, and former president and CEO of the Argosy Foundation, Wisconsin Investment Partners, and other individual investors contributed $2.1 million to "Gener8tor Fund II". The funds are for operations and investments of the Gener8tor companies.
