= Lee Holloway =

American politician and social worker (1946–2018)

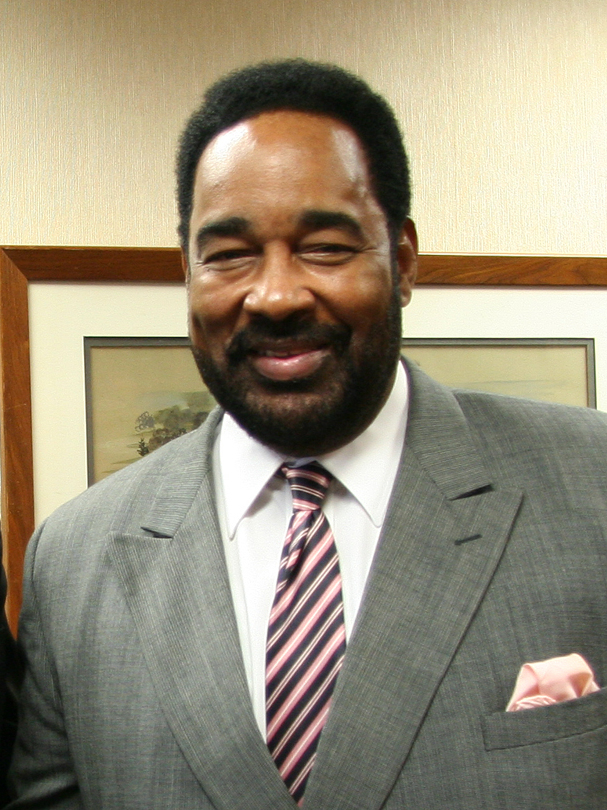
- Holloway in 2011

Acting Milwaukee County Executive
- In office December 28, 2010 – February 4, 2011
- Preceded by: Scott Walker
- Succeeded by: Marvin Pratt (interim)

Chair the Milwaukee County Board of Supervisors
- In office April 2004 – April 13, 2012
- Succeeded by: Marina Dimitrijevic

Member of the Milwaukee Board of Supervisors from the 5th District
- In office April 1992 – April 13, 2012
- Succeeded by: Russell W. Stamper

Personal details
- Born: Lee Edward Holloway; December 4, 1946
- Died: March 14, 2018 (aged 71)
- Education: University of Arkansas (B.A.); University of Wisconsin–Milwaukee (M.S)

Lee Holloway (December 4, 1946 - March 14, 2018) was an American social worker and politician who served two terms as chairman of the Milwaukee County Board of Supervisors. From December 28, 2010 to February 4, 2011, Lee Holloway served as Acting County Executive of Milwaukee County, Wisconsin.

== Early life, education, and career ==
Holloway was born in 1946. A lifelong Milwaukee resident, self-described as "the product of blue-collar, working-class people" (both of his parents worked in factories for many years). He graduated from Lincoln High School, where he played football and earned an athletic scholarship to the University of Arkansas, from which he graduated in 1969. By 1972, he'd returned to Milwaukee and earned an M.S. in developmental disabilities from the University of Wisconsin–Milwaukee.

He worked as a guidance counselor at Messmer High School before going into administration of social service agencies, including 4C's of Milwaukee County, the Inner City Development Project – North, and Milwaukee Comprehensive Community Health, of which he was the president and CEO.

== 1988 mayoral campaign ==
Holloway ran for mayor of Milwaukee in 1988, losing in the initial non-partisan primary to John Norquist and Martin Schreiber. He reflected that while he wasn't very political, he ran because felt that there should be an African-American in the race for mayor.

== County Board (1992–2012) ==
In 1992, Holloway successfully ran for county supervisor. He served five terms over the twenty years spanning between 1992 and 2012, being re-elected in 1996, 2000, 2004, and 2008.

Holloway was heavily involved in leading efforts that created a countywide general medical assistance as a healthcare social safety net. This model was later adapted statewide as BadgerCare.

In 2003, Holloway survived an effort to recall him.

=== County Board Chairman (2004–2012) ===
During his final two terms on the board, Holloway served as its chairman. He was the first African American to serve in that position.

Holloway was involved in and claimed credit for the successful campaign to win voter approval of a 2008 county referendum to increase the county sales tax.

In 2006, he agreed to pay $3,000 to resolve six counts against him for failure to make ethics disclosures of business relations he had with country contractors. In 2007, an attempt to remove Holloway as chair failed before the board.

==== Acting County Executive (2011) ====
When county executive Scott Walker was elected Governor of Wisconsin, Walker vacated the office of Milwaukee County Executive on December 28, 2010. In order to minimize disruptions caused by the vacancy, Lee Holloway, as chairman of the Milwaukee County Board of Supervisors, immediately assumed the office of Milwaukee County Executive, but was required, by law, to appoint an Interim County Executive within 30 days of assuming office. On January 25, 2011, Lee Holloway appointed Marvin Pratt, who was sworn in as Interim County Executive on February 4, 2011.

== Landlord ==
Holloway and his wife were the landlords for a number of rental properties in the City of Milwaukee, and had frequently clashed with city building inspectors over building code violations at these properties. His repeated failure to keep his buildings up to building code compliance faced scrutiny from local news media.

== Personal life ==
Holloway and his wife Lynda had four adult sons.

In 2013, a county pension employee formally accused that Holloway of having sexually assaulted her in his office on April 13, 2012 (Holloway's final day as county board chairman). Holloway denied these allegations. A criminal probe was opened into the matter. Holloway paid several hundred thousand dollars in a legal settlement to a civil lawsuit against him related to the allegation. The county government also paid the accuser a $24,000 settlement.
