= List of chiefs of the Milwaukee Police Department =

Chief of the Milwaukee Police Department
- Incumbent; Jeffrey B. Norman since December 2020 (Note: Norman was acting chief until November 15, 2021)
- Milwaukee Police Department
- Type: Chief of police
- Appointer: Fire and Police Commission
- Precursor: City sheriff
- Inaugural holder: William Beck
- Formation: 1855; 171 years ago

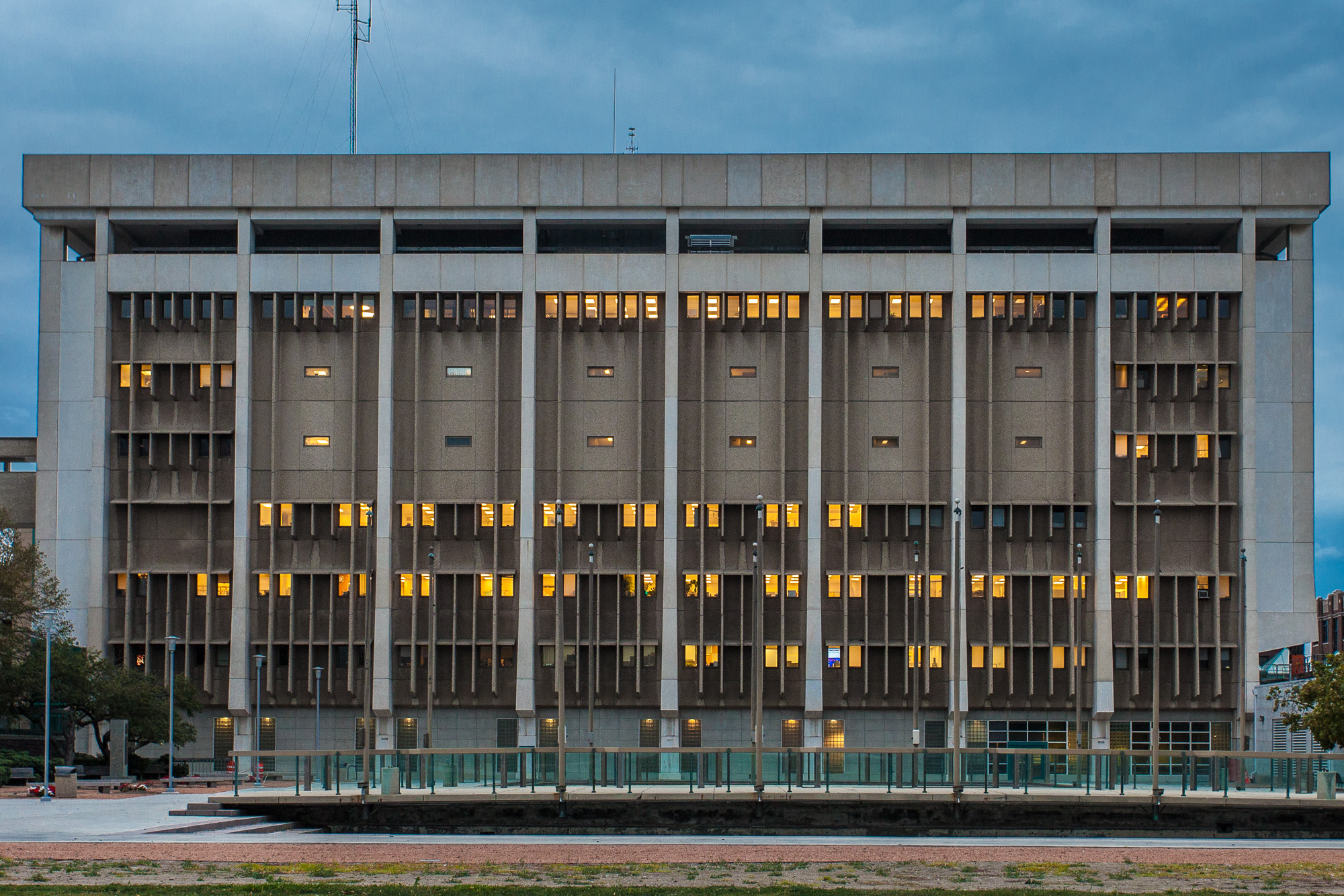
The Milwaukee Police Department headquarters in 2012

The chief of the Milwaukee Police Department is the head of the Milwaukee Police Department. The position was established in 1855 by mayor James B. Cross to replace the position of city sheriff. He appointed William Beck, a former member of the Wisconsin State Assembly, as the first chief, a position he held until his resignation in 1861; he later served two more non-consecutive terms. The mayor directly appointed the position, which caused the position to have a spoils system. The Fire and Police Commission was founded in 1885 with the sole authority to select and remove chiefs, replacing the previous system. In 1888, the commission fired Florian J. Ries, who had been appointed by Mayor Emil Wallber, and selected John T. Janssen, who served as chief until his resignation in 1921.

The department's first Hispanic chief was Phillip Arreola, who became chief in 1989 – following Arreola, Arthur L. Jones became the first African American chief and Nannette Hegerty became the first female chief in 1996 and 2003, respectively. The current chief is Jeffrey B. Norman, who entered office in December 2020.

== Chiefs ==
Chiefs of the Milwaukee Police Department
#	Name	Tenure start	Tenure end	Notes	Refs.
1st	William Beck	1855	October 1861		
2nd	Walter Sheldon Johnson	October 1861	April 1862	Also spelt "Johnston"	
3rd	Herman L. Page	1862	1863		
4th**	William Beck	1863	1878		
5th	Daniel Kennedy	1878	1880		
6th**	William Beck	1880	1882		
7th	Robert Wason Jr.	1882	1884	Also spelt "Wasson"	
8th	Lemuel Ellsworth	1884	1885		
9th	Florian J. Ries	1885	1888	Fired by the Police and Fire Commission	
10th	John T. Janssen	1888	1921	First chief appointed by the Police and Fire Commission	
11th	Jacob Laubenheimer	1921	1936		
12th	Joseph T. Kluchesky	1936	1945		
13th	John W. Polcyn	1945	1957		
14th	Howard O. Johnson	1957	1964		
15th	Harold A. Breier	1964	1984		
16th	Robert J. Ziarnik	1984	November 1989		
17th	Philip Arreola	November 1989	November 15, 1996	First Hispanic chief	
18th	Arthur L. Jones	November 15, 1996	November 18, 2003	First African American chief	
19th	Nannette Hegerty	November 18, 2003	November 15, 2007	First female chief	
20th	Edward A. Flynn	November 15, 2007	February 16, 2018		
21st	Alfonso Morales	February 2018	August 6, 2020	Acting until 2020; fired	
22nd	Jeffrey B. Norman	December 2020	Incumbent	Acting until November 15, 2021	
