= Edward A. Flynn =

American law enforcement executive

Edward Flynn

Chief of the Milwaukee Police Department
- In office January 7, 2008 – February 16, 2018
- Preceded by: Nannette Hegerty
- Succeeded by: Alfonso Morales

Secretary of the Massachusetts Executive Office of Public Safety and Security
- In office January 2003 – March 2006
- Governor: Mitt Romney
- Preceded by: James Jajuga
- Succeeded by: Robert C. Haas

Personal details
- Born: Edward A. Flynn; 1948 (age 77–78) Brielle, New Jersey, U.S.
- Spouse: Susan Flynn
- Education: La Salle University (BA); John Jay College of Criminal Justice (MA)

Edward A. Flynn (born 1948) is an American law enforcement executive. From 2008 until 2018, Flynn served as chief of the Milwaukee Police Department. Prior to assuming that position, he served as secretary of the Massachusetts Executive Office of Public Safety and Security and as police commissioner in Springfield, Massachusetts. Flynn was reappointed twice to the position of Milwaukee police chief before retiring in early 2018.

== Early life and education ==
Flynn grew up in Brielle, New Jersey, the only child of Edward, a paralyzed World War II veteran who died when Flynn was 12, and Constance, who worked part-time at the local library. Flynn attended St. Catherine's School in nearby Spring Lake, then graduated from high school at Christian Brothers Academy in Lincroft in 1966.

Flynn earned a B.A. in history from La Salle University in 1970 and a master's degree in criminal justice from the John Jay College of Criminal Justice in 1976.

== Career ==
=== Early career ===
After college, Flynn worked for the New Jersey Department of Public Welfare. In 1971, he joined the Hillside Township, New Jersey police department. From 1973 to 1988, he was a member of the Jersey City, New Jersey police department, rising to the rank of inspector.

From 1988 to 1993, he served as police chief of Braintree, Massachusetts. In Braintree, Flynn developed a reputation for using high-quality equipment. He was responsible for computerizing the department.

From 1993 to 1998, he served as chief of police in Chelsea, Massachusetts. During his tenure, the police department adopted a community policing model, decentralized authority, recruited and promoted minorities, and encouraged inter-agency cooperation.

From 1998 to 2002, he served as police chief in Arlington County, Virginia, where he was responsible for leading the police department's responses to the September 11, 2001, attack on the Pentagon, and to the 2002 Beltway sniper shootings.

He returned to Massachusetts in January 2003, when then-governor Mitt Romney appointed him as secretary of the Massachusetts Executive Office of Public Safety and Security, the parent agency of the state police, department of correction, the National Guard, the department of fire services, office of the chief medical examiner, parole board, and the emergency management agency.

Flynn resigned from Romney's cabinet in March 2006, when he was appointed police commissioner in Springfield, Massachusetts. Eighteen months into his five-year contract there, Flynn became a finalist for the chief of police position in Milwaukee. He was criticized by elected officials in Springfield, including mayor Charles Ryan and city councilor and mayor-elect Domenic Sarno for seeking a job. Flynn was appointed Milwaukee chief of police on November 15, 2007, but remained in Springfield until the following January.

=== Milwaukee police chief ===
Flynn was sworn in as Milwaukee police chief on January 7, 2008. He was only the second outsider in the history of the Milwaukee Police Department to be named chief.

In 2009, Flynn admitted to an affair with journalist Jessica McBride. Initial claims by Daniel Bice of the Milwaukee Journal Sentinel (MJS)—who penned a "Watchdog column" covering Wisconsin government entitled "No Quarter"—that the affair was ongoing or coincident with a McBride story on the police chief have been rebutted by Milwaukee Magazine editor Bruce Murphy. Such coincidence would have implied conflict of interest, and so an issue of journalistic ethics, and Murphy, who edited the 5,400-word profile that McBride had written on Flynn, presented evidence to the contrary, and accused Bice of selective reporting of the facts of the Flynn-McBride case. Although Flynn claimed that the affair had ended in 2009, the scandal reemerged briefly in July 2012 when a letter written by McBride's husband to Flynn's wife asserting a continuing affair was submitted to the City of Milwaukee, and was thereafter released to the press.

In late 2011, his contract was renewed for an additional four years, marking the first time since 1863 that a Milwaukee police chief was reappointed. He was credited with crime reductions every year of his tenure in Milwaukee, as well as mending police-citizen relations.

In 2012, it was revealed that complaints were filed against seven Milwaukee police officers and a sergeant alleging that they performed unauthorized rectal searches during traffic stops. Flynn announced that all of them had been stripped of their police powers while the allegations were under investigation and urged citizens who felt that they had been subjected to an illegal strip search to come forward.

Flynn was reappointed by a unanimous decision of the city's Fire and Police Commission to a third four-year term in July 2015.

On January 8, 2018, Flynn announced his retirement as police chief effective February 16, 2018.

== Personal life ==
Flynn and his wife Susan have been married since 1973. The couple has two grown children. Susan has remained in Virginia while Flynn has worked in Massachusetts and Wisconsin due to her career and desire to stay close to family.

Flynn was a 1996 National Institute of Justice Pickett Fellow at the Kennedy School of Government at Harvard University.

Police appointments
Preceded by John V. Polio	Braintree, Massachusetts Chief of Police; 1988–1993	Succeeded by Paul Frazier
Preceded by Joslin Ham	Chelsea, Massachusetts Chief of Police; 1993–1998	Succeeded by Rafael P. Hernandez Jr.
Preceded by Robert A. Dreischer (Acting)	Arlington County, Virginia Chief of Police; 1998–2003	Succeeded by Steve Holl
Preceded by James Jajuga	Massachusetts Secretary of Public Safety & Homeland Security; 2003–2006	Succeeded by Robert C. Haas
Preceded by William J. Fitchet (Acting)	Springfield, Massachusetts Police Commissioner; 2006–2008	Succeeded by William J. Fitchet
Preceded by Nannette Hegerty	Milwaukee Chief of Police; 2008–2018	Succeeded by Alfonso Morales
