= Milwaukee shooting =

Milwaukee shooting may refer to:

- Shooting of Dontre Hamilton, the 2014 fatal shooting by a Milwaukee police officer
- 2016 Milwaukee riots, a series of riots that occurred after the fatal shooting of Sylville Smith by Milwaukee police
- 2020 Milwaukee brewery shooting, a mass shooting at the Molson Coors Beverage Company
