= Milwaukee riot =

Milwaukee riot may refer to:

- 1967 Milwaukee riot
- 2016 Milwaukee riots
