= List of mayors of Methuen, Massachusetts =

The Mayor of Methuen is the head of the municipal government in Methuen, Massachusetts.

== List of mayors ==
#	Mayor	Picture	Term	Party	Notes
1st	Samuel Rushton		1918-1921	Democratic	First mayor under the First City charter.
2nd	Dennis A. Dizoglio		1994-2000	Democratic	First mayor under the Third City charter.
3rd	Sharon Pollard		2000-2006	Democratic	
4th	William M. Manzi III		2006-2012	Democratic	
5th	Stephen N. Zanni		2012–2017	Democratic	
6th	James Jajuga		2018–2020	Democratic	
7th	Neil Perry		2020–2024	Democratic	Died in office
Acting	D.J. Beauregard		2024–present	Democratic	Acting mayor following the death of Neil Perry
