= List of Massachusetts Wildlife Management Areas =

Massachusetts Wildlife Management Areas are protected areas in the U.S. state of Massachusetts. The Massachusetts Division of Fisheries and Wildlife is tasked with managing Massachusetts fauna and flora. Enforcement is provided by the Massachusetts Department of Public Safety. There are Thirteen wildlife management zones and thirteen wildlife sanctuaries.

== Wildlife Management Areas ==
- Abbott Brook WMA
- Agawam Lake WMA
- Ashburnham WMA
- Ashby WMA
- Ashfield Hawley WMA
- Atwood Reservoir WMA: 511 acres (207 ha) including reservoir.
- Bachelor Brook WMA
- Barre Falls WMA
- Barton's Ledge WMA
- Bearse Pond WMA
- Bennett Meadows WMA
- Bennett WMA
- Birch Hill WMA
- Black Brook WMA
- Blueberry Pond WMA
- Bolton Flats WMA
- Boxborough Station WMA
- Brayton Point WMA
- Breakneck Brook WMA
- Brewer Brook WMA
- Brodie Mountain WMA
- Brushy Mountain WMA
- Bullock Ledge WMA
- Bungy Mountain WMA
- Burrage Pond WMA
- Camp Cachalot WMA
- Camp Edwards WMA
- Canoe River WMA
- Castle Neck River WMA
- Catamount WMA
- Chalet WMA: 7,796 acres (3,155 ha) in Windsor, Cheshire, Dalton, and Lanesborough.
- Charles River WMA: 8,100 acres (3,300 ha) of protected wetlands across sixteen communities.
- Chase Garden Creek WMA
- Chicopee Brook WMA
- Chockalog Swamp WMA
- Clapps Pond WMA
- Clinton Bluff WMA
- Cooks Pond WMA
- Copicut WMA
- Coy Hill WMA
- Crane Pond WMA: 2,594.4 acres (1,049.9 ha).
- Cummington WMA
- Dartmoor Farm WMA
- Darwin Scott WMA
- Day Mountain WMA
- Delaney WMA
- Dennis Grassy Pond WMA
- Dolomite Ledges WMA
- Dunstable Brook WMA
- E. Kent Swift WMA
- Eagle Island WMA
- East Mountain WMA
- Eastham Salt Marsh WMA
- Elbow Meadow WMA
- English Salt Marsh WMA
- Erwin S. Wilder WMA
- Eugene D. Moran WMA
- Facing Rock WMA
- Fairfield Brook WMA
- Farmington River WMA
- Fessenden Hill WMA
- Fish Brook WMA
- Fisk Forestdale WMA
- Leadmine Wildlife Management Area
