= William Beck =

William Beck may refer to:

- William King Beck (fl. 1820s), namesake of the William King Beck House, a historic plantation near Camden, Alabama
- William Beck (Wisconsin politician) (1823–1911), American politician from Wisconsin
- William Beck (architect) (fl. 1860s), London Quaker architect
- William Thomas Beck (1865–1947), New Zealand Army officer
- William W. Beck (1870–1923), American politician from Maryland
- William Beck (cyclist) (1899–1975), American cyclist
- William Beck (Dean of Worcester) (1884–1957), British Anglican clergyman
- William F. Beck (1904–1966), Lutheran minister and translator of the Bible
- William Beck (alpine skier) (1929–2017), American alpine skier
- William Beck Sr. (born 1934), Republican member of the Montana Legislature
- William Beck (actor), Welsh-born English actor

== See also ==
- Bill Beck (disambiguation)
- William Beck Ochiltree (1811–1867), American settler, judge, and legislator in Texas
- William De Beck (1890–1942), American cartoonist
