= Robert C. Haas =

Police officer, State Cabinet Secretary

Massachusetts Secretary of Public Safety
- In office 2006–2007
- Governor: Mitt Romney
- Preceded by: Edward A. Flynn
- Succeeded by: Kevin M. Burke

Personal details
- Education: William Paterson College; Rutgers University; Northeastern University
- Occupation: Law Enforcement Official

Robert C. Haas is an American former law enforcement official who was the Police Commissioner for the Cambridge, Massachusetts Police Department, and previously served as Secretary of Public Safety and Undersecretary of Law Enforcement and Homeland Security under Massachusetts Governor Mitt Romney, as Chief of Police in Westwood, Massachusetts, and as a police officer in Morris Township, New Jersey.
