= James Jajuga =

American politician (born 1946)

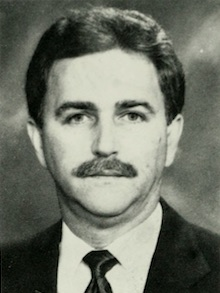
- Jajuga in 1991

Mayor of Methuen, Massachusetts
- In office 2018–2020
- Preceded by: Steve Zanni
- Succeeded by: Neil Perry

Massachusetts Secretary of Public Safety
- In office 2001–2003
- Governor: Jane M. Swift
- Preceded by: Jane Perlov
- Succeeded by: Edward A. Flynn

Member of the Massachusetts Senate
- In office 1991–2001
- Preceded by: Nicholas J. Costello
- Succeeded by: Steven A. Baddour

Personal details
- Born: December 12, 1946 (age 79) Haverhill, Massachusetts, U.S.
- Party: Independent (2016-present); Democrat (?-2016)
- Education: Northeastern University; Boston University
- Occupation: Politician

James Paul Jajuga (born December 12, 1946, Haverhill, Massachusetts) is an American politician who was Mayor of Methuen, Massachusetts between 2017 and 2020. He also served as Massachusetts Secretary of Public Safety from 2001 to 2003. He later represented the Third Essex District in the Massachusetts Senate from 1991 to 2001. On June 25, 2019, Jajuga announced he would not be running for re-election as Methuen's mayor. Neil Perry succeeded him, winning the 2019 election. He's also a two-time former city councilor, US Marine and a member of the Massachusetts State Police.

== Term as mayor ==
Methuen had several fiscal issues while Jajuga was on the City Council and served as mayor, including a School Department that overspent its budget by $4 million and a contract with the police department where captains would $434,841 on average. To keep within the budget, the initial plan was to lay off a large percentage of the patrol cops. As a result of their financial issues, there was a temporary state overseer and a new government structure put in place.

Jajuga was named in a civil rights lawsuit filed by City of Methuen electrician Dan Tulley. The suit was filed in federal court and alleges "political retaliation and an offer of political payoffs in exchange for his step-son's support on the Methuen Police Superior Officer's contract." Tulley's stepson is Methuen City Councilor James McCarty. Jajuga's son is a captain on the police force and McCarty "opposed Jajuga's efforts to settle the contract and threatened to lay off police officers or reorganize the police superior officers, which would have cut Jajuga's son's position."
