= Jacob Laubenheimer =

Chief of the Milwaukee Police Department

Jacob Laubenheimer (1874 – 1936) was Chief of the Milwaukee Police Department.

== Biography ==
Laubenheimer was born Jacob George Laubenheimer in Milwaukee, Wisconsin in 1874. He died in 1936.

== Career ==
Laubenheimer joined the police department in 1893. He was appointed as the chief of police in 1921. The following year, he established the world's first police academy. Also during his tenure, Laubenheimer more than doubled the number of personnel, including allowing women and African Americans to join the department. Squad cars also began being equipped with radios for the first time.
