= Mothers of the Movement =

African-American women's activist group

Mothers of the Movement is an activism group, created by a number of women whose African American children have been killed by police officers or by gun violence. Members of the group have appeared on various television shows, news broadcasts and segments, at award ceremonies, and political events to share their experiences losing a son or daughter to police violence and advocate for political change, stricter gun laws and more police regulation.

The Mothers of the Movement movement started as a result of the 2013 acquittal of George Zimmerman after he fatally shot and killed teenager Trayvon Martin. The women have attended many conventions to spread awareness of the police brutality crisis in the United States. The members of the movement use their grief to rally more people around their cause and increase involvement in their movement. They also highlight the injustice they have endured with the loss of their son or daughter's life. They also talk about life after loss, the five stages of grief (denial, anger, bargaining, depression, and acceptance), and how to move forward after a traumatic event.

== Political activism ==
=== 2016 Democratic National Convention ===
Seven women from the group—Gwen Carr, mother of Eric Garner; Sybrina Fulton, mother of Trayvon Martin; Maria Hamilton, mother of Dontre Hamilton; Lucy McBath, mother of Jordan Davis (and future U.S. Representative); Lezley McSpadden, mother of Michael Brown, Cleopatra Pendleton-Cowley, mother of Hadiya Pendleton; and Geneva Reed-Veal, mother of Sandra Bland—spoke in support of Clinton's candidacy for president during the July 2016 Democratic National Convention in Philadelphia. Clinton had reached out privately the previous November to meet with the women. The Mothers of the Movement subsequently joined Clinton on the campaign trail to support her candidacy and advocate for an end to these killings.

Samaria Rice, the mother of Tamir Rice, did not join the other mothers in their endorsement of Hillary Clinton. She did not see an acceptable level of commitment against police brutality from any of the candidates and therefore withheld her endorsement. She did support the other mothers, saying in an interview with Fusion, "I hope they going to hold her accountable for whatever discussions they had behind closed doors." The Mothers of the Movement have been criticized for being used by the Clinton campaign, but members of the movement continue to deny this claim.

=== Women's March 2017 ===
Mothers of the Movement accompanied singer and actress Janelle Monáe appearing at the Women's March on Washington on January 21, 2017, after the inauguration of President Donald Trump.

=== In the media ===
In August 2016, several members appeared with Beyoncé at the Video Music Awards. Gwen Carr, Lezley McSpadden, and Sybrina Fulton had also appeared in the singer's short film "LEMONADE", accompanying her 2016 album of the same name, holding photos of their slain sons.

Women from the Mothers of the Movement group appeared on The Dr. Oz Show special episode entitled, "Healing America’s Grief: Mothers of The Movement And Mothers of Slain Officers Together For The First Time", which appeared on air September 12, 2016. The show featured the mothers of victims of police violence as well as mothers of police officers killed by civilians. Guests of the show included Sybrina Fulton, Lucy McBath, Geneva Reed-Veal, Cleopatra Cowley, Maria Hamilton, Samara Rice, Lesley McSpadden, Wanda Johnson, Gwen Carr, Valerie Zamarripa, Paulette Thompson, and Nancy Renninger. Both groups spoke about losing a son or daughter to violence and as well as the difficulties of grieving in public. Additionally, Reed-Veal explained the need for more global conversations about racism and violence.

Gwen Carr, Sybrina Fulton, and Lezley McSpadden spoke at the 2016 Triumph Awards, a joint venture by National Action Network and TV One to recognize distinguished individuals and corporations in civil rights, the arts, entertainment, education, business and sports who have made a positive impact on society by utilizing their talents and resources to help under-resourced communities. The ceremony was hosted at the Tabernacle Theater in Atlanta and aired on Sunday, October 2, 2016, at 7 p.m. EDT.

=== 2020 Presidential Election ===
In the 2020 US Presidential election, the Mothers of the Movement endorsed Joe Biden, saying that "though Donald Trump continues to call himself the law and order candidate from 2016 to now, he has not offered a single solution in the wake of many horrible, senseless shootings during his term."

== See also ==
- Black Lives Matter
- Racism in the United States
- Rest in Power: The Enduring Life of Trayvon Martin
- 2016 United States presidential election
