= Florian J. Ries =

19th century American politician

Member of the Wisconsin State Assembly from the Milwaukee 6th district
- In office January 1, 1877 – January 7, 1878
- Preceded by: Charles Kraatz
- Succeeded by: Henry Smith

Personal details
- Born: Valentin Florian Ries; April 30, 1843 Gamburg, Grand Duchy of Baden
- Died: August 12, 1910 Milwaukee, Wisconsin
- Resting place: Forest Home Cemetery, Milwaukee
- Party: Republican
- Occupation: Alcohol wholesaler

Military service
- Allegiance: United States
- Branch/service: United States Volunteers; Union Army
- Years of service: 1861–1865
- Rank: 1st Lieutenant, USV
- Unit: 1st Reg. Wis. Vol. Infantry; 17th Reg. Wis. Vol. Infantry
- Battles/wars: American Civil War

Florian J. Ries (April 30, 1843 – August 12, 1910) was a German American immigrant, alcohol merchant, and Republican politician. He served one term in the Wisconsin State Assembly, representing the north side of the city of Milwaukee, and was chief of the Milwaukee Police Department. He also served as a Union Army volunteer throughout the American Civil War.

== Biography ==
Ries was born in 1843 in the Grand Duchy of Baden. He was a lieutenant colonel in the Wisconsin State Militia. Following the outbreak of the American Civil War, he enlisted with the 1st Wisconsin Infantry Regiment of the Union Army. He later re-enlisted with the 17th Wisconsin Infantry Regiment, rising to the rank of first lieutenant. Ries was chief of the Milwaukee Police Department from 1885 to 1888.

== Political career ==
Ries was a member of the Wisconsin State Assembly during the 1877 session. He also served as a member of the Milwaukee Common Council and justice of the peace. Ries was a Republican.

Wisconsin State Assembly
| Preceded by Charles Kraatz | Member of the Wisconsin State Assembly from the Milwaukee 6th district January 1, 1877 – January 7, 1878 | Succeeded by Henry Smith |
