= Nannette Hegerty =

Chief of the Milwaukee Police Department from 2003 to 2007

Chief of the Milwaukee Police Department
- In office November 18, 2003 – November 15, 2007
- Preceded by: Arthur L. Jones
- Succeeded by: Edward A. Flynn

U.S. Marshal for the Eastern District of Wisconsin
- In office 1994–2002
- Appointed by: Bill Clinton

Personal details
- Born: 1950 or 1951 (age 75–76)
- Police career
- Department: Milwaukee Police Department
- Service years: 1976–1994; 2002–2007
- Rank: Lieutenant; Captain

Nannette "Nan" Hegerty (born 1950 or 1951) is an American former police officer who served as the chief of the Milwaukee Police Department (MPD) from 2003 to 2007. She also served as U.S. Marshal for the Eastern District of Wisconsin from 1994 to 2002.

Hegerty joined the MPD in 1976 as one of its first female officers, rising to the positions of lieutenant and captain; the first woman to hold either, before being appointed as a Marshal by President Bill Clinton in 1994. In 2002, she rejoined the MPD, becoming the head of its sensitive crimes commission. A year later, she was appointed as chief of the department, the first and only woman to hold that position, which she held until her retirement in 2007.

== Biography ==
Hegerty was born in 1950 or 1951. She was known affectionately as "Nan". Hegerty joined the Milwaukee Police Department (MPD) in 1976, becoming one of the department's first female officers. She became the first female lieutenant and captain in the department's history in the 1990s.

In 1994, then-captain Hegerty was appointed as U.S. Marshal for the Eastern District of Wisconsin by President Bill Clinton. Towards the end of 2002, she rejoined the department, becoming the head of the sensitive crimes commission.

=== Chief of the Milwaukee Police Department ===
Hegerty became the chief of the MPD on November 18, 2003, becoming the first female to hold the position.

As chief, Hegerty was credited with re-introducing the gang department, reworking the discipline system, and reassigning officers from working desk jobs to the streets. During her first year as chief, crimes fell and homicides hit a 16-year low, however, crime rebounded in the later years.

In October 2004, while Hegerty was chief, Frank Jude Jr., a 26-year-old black man, was beaten outside an off-duty police officer party in the Bay View neighborhood, in which he was kicked in the head, stripped naked, and threatened by officers with a knife, on the accusation of stealing a badge from the officers. 10 officers were charged for their involvement in the beating. After the incident, Hegerty fired nine officers, placed three on unpaid suspension, and demoted a sergeant, in the largest firing from the department in a single day. While chief, she fired 37 officers, while her investigations into officers were criticized as "overzealous" by President of the Milwaukee Police Association John Balcerzak.

Hegerty was credited with pushing for better officers; supporting psychological exams for prospective police officers and personally reviewing each candidate's background checks. Executive director of the Milwaukee Fire and Police Commission David Heard credited her with being "able to assist in raising our hiring standards".

Hegerty also helped modernize the department; however, a new computer system, which cost US$7 million, encountered major malfunctions, temporarily forcing the department to use maps with push pins. She also installed cameras in squad cars.

Hegerty announced her retirement in January 2007, 11 months before the end of her term, and was projected to leave the office on November 16. By then, she would be 57 and eligible for retirement. She was the first chief to resign from the post since Harold Breier in 1984. Edward A. Flynn was appointed as chief to replace Hegerty on November 15, being sworn in the next January.

Hegerty was popular as chief; however, in her final months, questions arose about her effectiveness. While Mayor Tom Barrett described her as "a class act", saying that he "respect[ed] her very much as a person, as an administrator, [and] as a law enforcement official", The Rev. Rolen Womack of Progressive Baptist Church claimed she failed to make Milwaukee a better city, calling her "a nice person", but saying that she was not held to the same standards as previous chiefs. Willie Hines, the president of the Milwaukee Common Council, credited Hegerty in several areas, including "working toward restoration of the department's image and relations with the citizenry".
