= William Beck (Wisconsin politician) =

American politician and police officer (1823–1911)

Chief of the Milwaukee Police Department
- In office 1880–1882
- Preceded by: Daniel Kennedy
- Succeeded by: Robert Wason Jr.
- In office 1863–1878
- Preceded by: Herman L. Page
- Succeeded by: Daniel Kennedy
- In office September 1855 – October 1861
- Preceded by: Position established
- Succeeded by: Walter Sheldon Johnson

Member of the Wisconsin State Assembly
- In office January 5, 1852 – January 3, 1853

Personal details
- Born: April 16, 1823 Stuttgart, Kingdom of Württemberg
- Died: September 8, 1911 (aged 88)
- Party: Democratic

William Beck (April 16, 1823 – September 8, 1911) was a German-born American politician and police officer who served as a Democratic member of the Wisconsin State Assembly during the 1852 session. He was also the first chief of the Milwaukee Police Department from 1855 to 1861, and served two further times from 1863 to 1878, and 1880 to 1882.

== Biography ==
Beck was born April 16, 1823, in Stuttgart, a city in the Kingdom of Württemberg (present-day Germany). He immigrated to the United States in 1828. He became a policeman in New York City at the age of 19, after which he moved to California to become a gold miner. He was captured and wounded by a Native American tribe, experienced a shipwreck in the Pacific Ocean, and lived in Cuba, before settling in Granville, Wisconsin, in 1844.

On October 18, 1851, Beck was selected as a Democratic nominee for the Wisconsin State Assembly for the district containing Milwaukee, Granville, and Wauwatosa, defeating competitor Jasper Vliet. Later that year, he defeated Whig candidate Samuel Church with 75.4% of the vote. He served a single one-year term during the 1852 session.

Beck, who had previously served as a deputy sheriff, was appointed as the first chief of the Milwaukee Police Department in September 1855, serving as chief until October 1861, when he was replaced as chief by Walter Sheldon Johnson. He began a second non-consecutive term as chief in 1863, replacing outgoing chief Herman L. Page, before being succeeded in 1878 by Daniel Kennedy, who had served as a "roundsman", who supervised the patrolmen below him, under Beck. In 1880, he was appointed for a third and final term, succeeding Kennedy, before leaving office in 1882 and being succeeded by Robert Wason Jr. While serving as chief, Beck was wounded twice, in 1864 and 1872.

Beck died on September 8, 1911. He was 88 years old.
