= Massachusetts Emergency Management Agency =

American state government agency

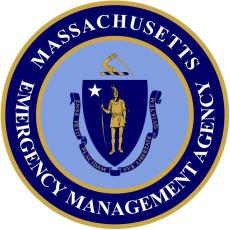

Agency overview
- Jurisdiction: Massachusetts
- Headquarters: 400 Worcester Road, Framingham, Massachusetts
- Agency executives: Dawn Brantley, Director; Pat Carnevale, Deputy Director
- Parent department: Massachusetts Executive Office of Public Safety and Security
- Website: www.mass.gov/orgs/massachusetts-emergency-management-agency

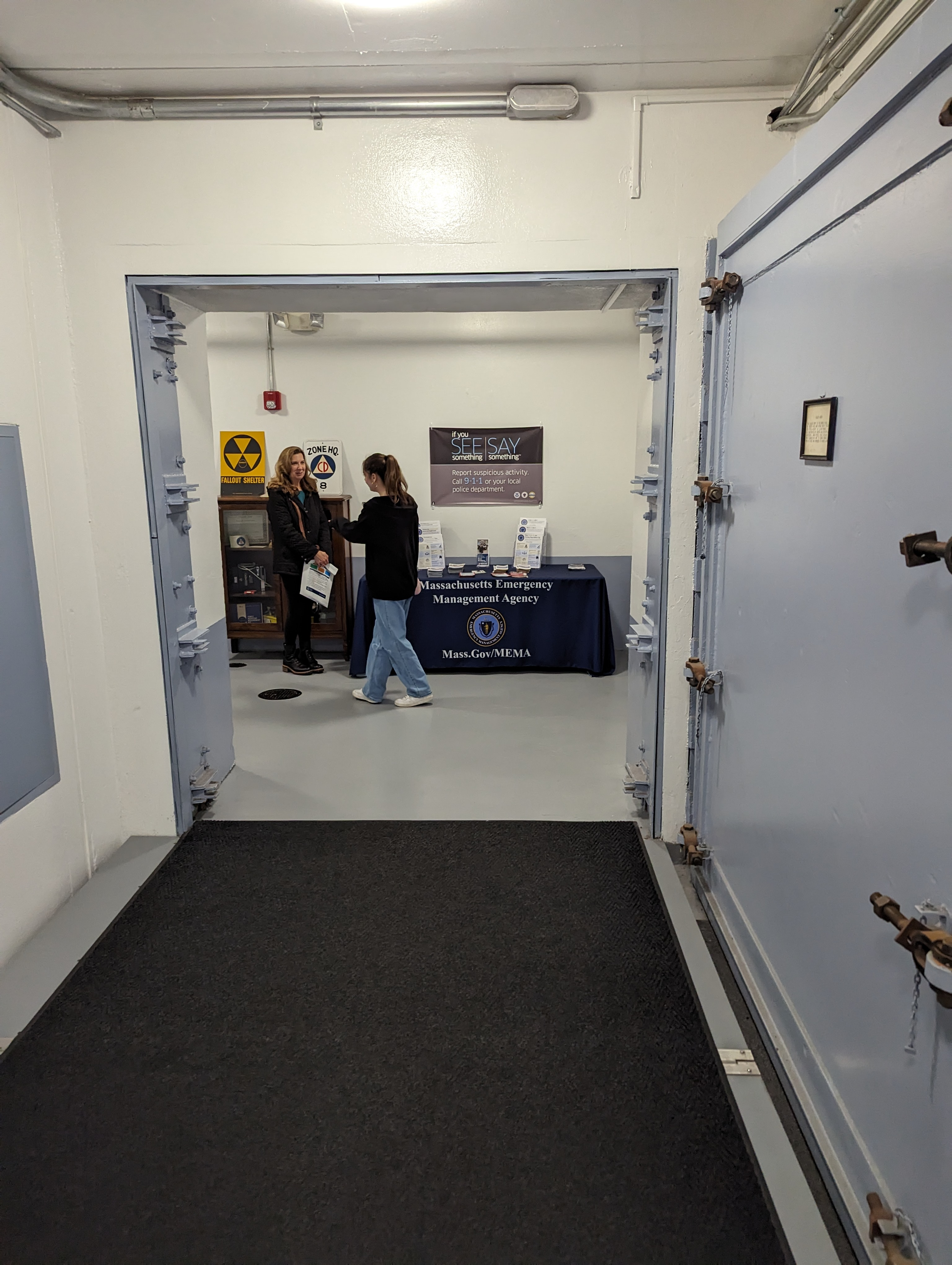
The underground entrance of the MEMA bunker with a blast door.

The Massachusetts Emergency Management Agency (MEMA) is the agency of the Commonwealth of Massachusetts that coordinates federal, state, local, and private resources throughout the Commonwealth during times of disasters and emergencies.

It is headquartered in Framingham on Route 9 in between the cities of Boston and Worcester. There are also three other regional offices, in Franklin, Tewksbury, and Agawam.

== MEMA’s Mission ==
The Massachusetts Emergency Management Agency (MEMA) is the state agency responsible for coordinating federal, state, local, voluntary, and private resources during emergencies and disasters in the Commonwealth of Massachusetts. MEMA provides leadership to: develop plans for effective response to all hazards, disasters or threats; train emergency personnel to protect the public; provide information to the citizenry; and assist individuals, families, businesses, and communities to mitigate, prepare for, and respond to and recover from emergencies, both natural and man made.

== Operations Department ==
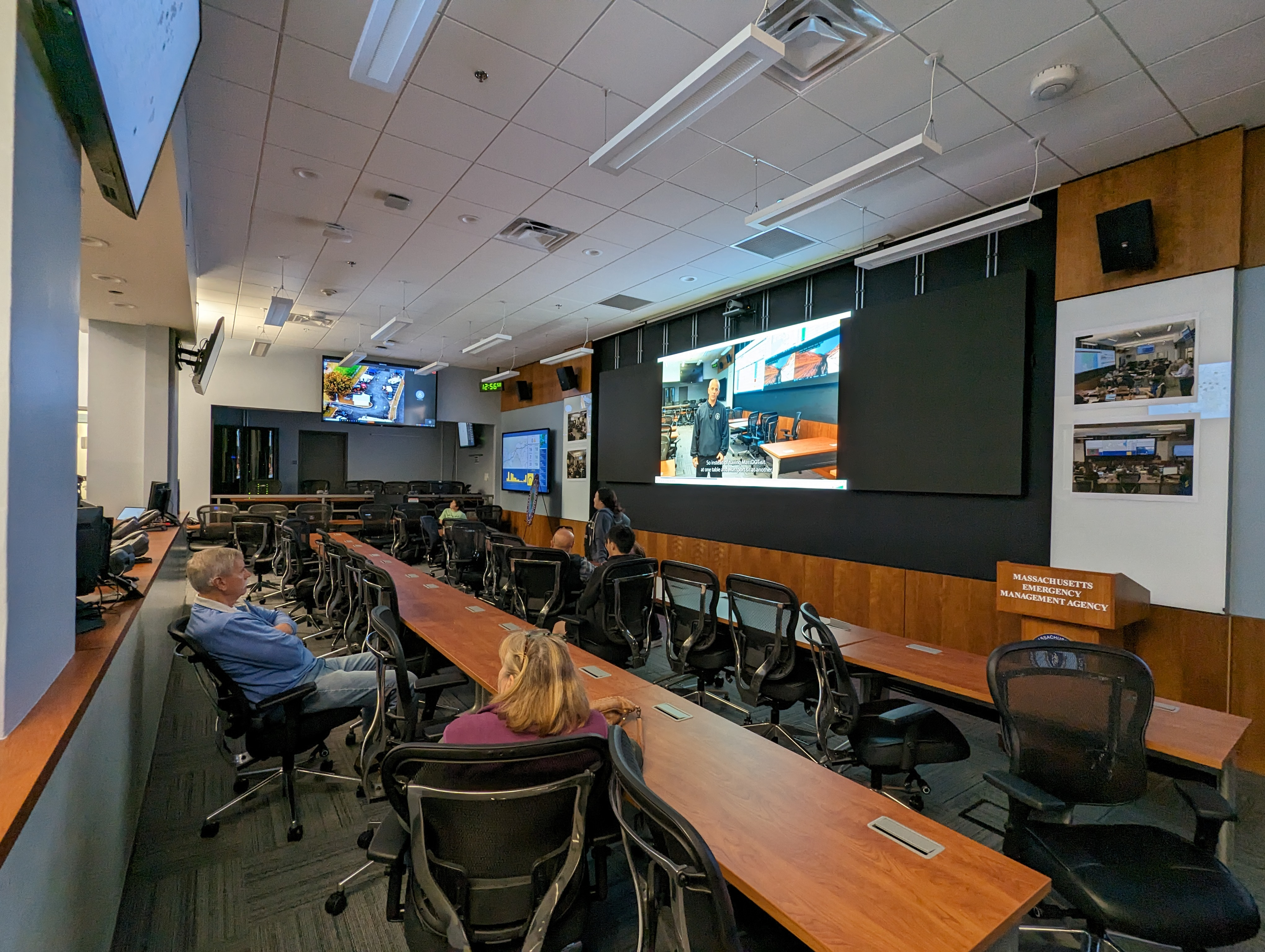
An EOC conference room in the MEMA bunker.

The Operations Division of MEMA maintains and operates the state Emergency Operations Center (EOC), monitoring emergencies statewide through the Communications Division 24 hours a day, 7 days a week. The state EOC serves as the command and control center for the Commonwealth during an emergency.

The Operations Division manages and coordinates emergency response efforts for the Commonwealth. Through MEMA regional offices, it coordinates the response to requests for aid from local authorities upon depletion of their local resources.

The Massachusetts Emergency Management Team (MEMT) is prepared and trained by the Operations Division. MEMT's members are the many state, federal, local, volunteer, public, and private agencies and organizations which are represented at the State EOC during activation for an emergency for better coordination of the Commonwealth's assets. Operations Division is also responsible for updating and publishing the Governor's Emergency Notification Roster, preparing and maintaining MEMA's master calendar, and assuring that MEMA maintains a high degree of preparedness and readiness.

== Planning Department ==
The Planning Department works with municipal, state, federal, and volunteer organizations on a variety of emergency management planning issues. The Planning Department assists communities in the development and maintenance of their Comprehensive Emergency Plans (CEMP), addressing mitigation, preparedness, response, and recovery from natural and technological emergencies.

The Planning Department also maintains the State Comprehensive Emergency Management Plan. The State CEMP is utilized by MEMA to manage multi-agency state response to large-scale emergencies. The State CEMP provides linkage to the Federal Response Plan for requesting federal disaster assistance.

Management of the State Emergency Response Commission (SERC) activities; planning, training, grant management, and SERC sub-committees is the responsibility of the MEMA Hazardous Materials Coordinator within the Planning Department.

Finally, the Planning Department supports planning for hazard-specific events such as major aircraft accidents, debris management, terrorism, donations management, and other topics.

== See also ==
- Federal Emergency Management Agency (FEMA)
- Emergency management
