= Bill Beck =

Bill Beck may refer to:

- Bill Beck (coach) (1900–1965), American football and baseball coach
- Bill Beck (politician) (1962–2023), American politician from Tennessee
- Billy Beck (1920–2011), American clown and character actor
- Billy Beck (musician), musician in American funk band Ohio Players

== See also ==
- William Beck (disambiguation)
