= Killing of Dontre Hamilton =

2014 shooting in Red Arrow Park in Milwaukee, Wisconsin

- Date: April 30, 2014
- Location: Red Arrow Park, Milwaukee, Wisconsin, U.S.
- Type: Shooting
- Participants: Christopher Manney
- Outcome: Manney fired from Milwaukee Police Department
- Deaths: Dontre Hamilton
- Charges: None filed

On April 30, 2014, Dontre Hamilton was shot and killed by police officer Christopher Manney, at Red Arrow Park in Milwaukee, Wisconsin. No charges were brought, but Manney was fired from the force. As a result of the shooting and subsequent protests, Milwaukee police officers were equipped with body cameras.

== Background ==
Dontre D. Hamilton (1983 – April 30, 2014), of Milwaukee, was 31 years old at the time of his death. Hamilton had a history of mental illness. According to Milwaukee Police Chief Edward Flynn, Hamilton had a prior history of arrests in Milwaukee which were "directly connected to mental health issues." However, it was later revealed that Dontre had no history of arrest and the reference history actually belonged to his brother. Hamilton's family stated that Hamilton had been treated for schizophrenia but was not violent. In the days before his death, Hamilton told his family that he was "tired and hungry, and that somebody was going to kill him."

== Shooting ==
On April 30, 2014, Manney shot Hamilton fourteen times, killing him. The Milwaukee Journal Sentinel summarized the events as follows:

Before the encounter, a pair of officers responding to a call that Hamilton was asleep in the park checked on him twice and found he was doing nothing wrong. When Manney arrived, he was not aware that other officers had preceded him. As Manney began to pat down Hamilton, Hamilton fought him, and a confrontation ensued. Manney tried to use his baton to subdue Hamilton, but Hamilton got control of it and swung at Manney, hitting him on the side of the neck, according to Milwaukee police internal affairs.

No additional weapons were found on Hamilton's person.

== Aftermath ==
=== Investigation ===
The investigation was carried out by the Wisconsin Division of Criminal Investigation, a statewide agency, but the lead agents for the investigation were former Milwaukee police officers.

The Milwaukee County District Attorney's Office conducted an investigation. In December 2014, District Attorney John Chisholm found the use of force to be in self-defense and declined to prosecute.

A federal investigation took place, and was closed in November 2015, with federal authorities determining that there was insufficient evidence to pursue federal criminal civil rights charges against Manney.

=== Firing of Manney ===
After the shooting, Manney applied for duty disability, saying the shooting and its aftermath caused him to experience severe post-traumatic stress disorder.

Police Chief Edward Flynn fired Manney after the shooting. In March 2015, a three-member panel of the Milwaukee Fire and Police Commission unanimously upheld the firing, sustaining and confirming the two conclusions of an internal investigation, which determined that:

1. Manney had conducted a frisking process without a reasonable suspicion.
2. Manney did not follow departmental "Defense and Arrest Tactics."

The firing does not affect Manney's pending disability application.

=== Lawsuit ===
In 2014, Jovan Blacknell was retained by the family of Hamilton. In 2017, the Hamilton family received a 2.3 million dollar settlement from the City of Milwaukee.

=== Protests ===
Dontre's brother, Nate Hamilton, has also since co-founded the Coalition for Justice, an organization that has led rallies, marches, and street clean-ups. The Black Lives Matter movement has also protested about Hamilton's death.

=== Policy changes ===
In the aftermath of Hamilton's death, "Hamilton's family members worked with Milwaukee Mayor Tom Barrett, the Police Department and other city leaders to have all officers receive Crisis Intervention Team training, considered the gold standard for working with people in psychiatric crisis, by 2017."

Additionally, eight Milwaukee aldermen and a majority of the Milwaukee Common Council, called in December 2014 for equipping all city police officers with body cameras on an expedited basis. In October 2015, the Fire and Police Commission approved, by a 4–1 vote, a new policy requiring "most Milwaukee police officers to wear body cameras at all times while on duty, though they will not be required to have the devices always activated." A four-phase implementation process was developed, and officers began to wear the cameras in October 2015. However, following a similar police shooting of a Milwaukee black man in 2016, the Milwaukee Police Department was criticized for not submitting a review of its new patterns and practices.

=== Film ===
In 2017, the film The Blood is at the Doorstep was released, which features Hamilton's family in the immediate months following his death. Directed by Erik Ljung, it was nominated for a SXSW Grand Jury Award, and won a Golden Badge Award at the Wisconsin Film Festival.

== See also ==
- Mothers of the Movement
- List of killing by law enforcement officers
