= Murder of Hadiya Pendleton =

2013 crime in Chicago, Illinois, U.S.

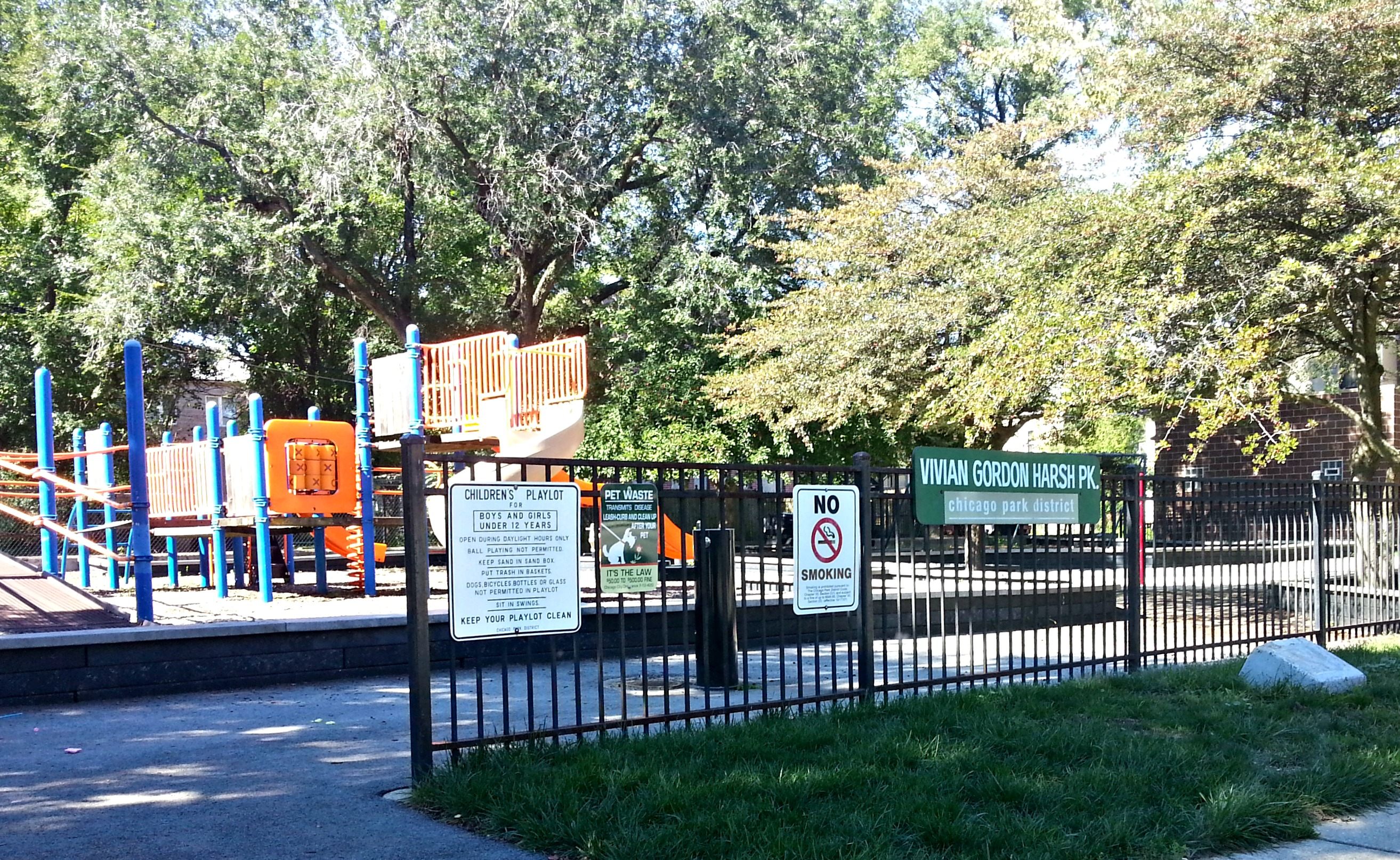
- Vivian Gordon Harsh Park
- Date: January 29, 2013; 13 years ago
- Location: Kenwood, Chicago, Illinois, U.S.; 41.81405°N 87.59556°W
- Cause: Mistaken gang rivalry
- Outcome: Death of Hadiya Pendleton
- Deaths: 1 (Hadiya Pendleton)
- Injuries: 2
- Suspects: Michael Ward, Kenneth Williams
- Charges: First degree murder, attempted murder, aggravated discharge of a firearm

The murder of Hadiya Pendleton occurred on January 29, 2013. Pendleton, a 15-year-old girl from Chicago, Illinois, was shot in the back and killed while standing with friends inside Harsh Park in Kenwood, Chicago after taking her final exams. As a student at King College Prep High School, she was killed only one week after performing at events for President Barack Obama’s second inauguration. First Lady Michelle Obama attended the funeral for Pendleton in Chicago.

President Obama mentioned Pendleton's death in his 2013 State of the Union Address in Congress, where Pendleton's parents, Cleopatra Cowley-Pendleton and Nathaniel A. Pendleton Sr., attended as guests. The crime scene is "just a mile away from [President Obama's] Chicago house".

Pendleton's mother, Cleopatra Cowley-Pendleton, went onstage but did not speak at the 2016 Democratic National Convention.

== Legal proceedings ==
Two suspects, Micheail Ward, 18, and Kenneth Williams, 20, were arrested and indicted with multiple counts of first degree murder, attempted murder, aggravated discharge of a weapon and many other charges. They told police that Pendleton was not the intended target. The group she was standing with was mistaken for members of a rival gang. A judge denied bail for the two gang members.

At the time of the shooting, Ward, the gunman, was on probation. In January 2012, he pleaded guilty to aggravated unlawful use of a weapon, and was sentenced to two years of probation. Less than three months later, he was arrested and charged with breaking into a car. In July 2012, he was arrested for breaking into a different vehicle. In November 2012, he was arrested for misdemeanor trespassing. During his youth, he had also been arrested numerous times on charges ranging from robbery to battery to marijuana possession, and had spent time on juvenile probation.

Ward and Williams were each charged with first-degree murder, attempted murder, and aggravated battery with a firearm. The trial started on August 14, 2018. On August 22, 2018, a jury found Williams guilty of first degree murder of Pendleton. Williams was also found guilty of aggravated battery towards Pendleton's friends, Sebastian Moore and Lawrence Sellers. On August 23, 2018, a jury found Ward guilty of first degree murder in the death of Pendleton. Ward was sentenced to 84 years in prison on January 14, 2019. On July 20, 2021, Williams was sentenced to 42 years in prison, 35 for the murder and seven for the aggravated battery.

On March 31, 2023, it was reported that Micheail Ward's conviction had been overturned by an Illinois Appellate Court, after determining his videotaped confession was inadmissible and should not have been entered into evidence at his trial. On January 2, 2025, it was reported that Micheail Ward had been granted the right to a new trial. On January 29, 2026, CBS News reported that Ward was still awaiting a new trial.

== Legacy ==
In the song "Jonylah Forever", rapper Lupe Fiasco presents an alternate reality in which Jonylah Watkins, who was murdered at the age of six months in Chicago in 2013, grows up to be a doctor and meets Hadiya Pendleton, who has become an artist. The song is featured on the album Drogas Wave.

In June 2026, an atrium at the Barack Obama Presidential Center was opened in her honor.

== See also ==
- List of homicides in Illinois
- Mothers of the Movement
