= 1967 Milwaukee riot =

Race riot in Wisconsin, United States

- Part of Long, hot summer of 1967
- Location: Milwaukee, Wisconsin, U.S.

Parties
Rioters	Wisconsin National Guard; Milwaukee Police Department

Number
	4,297 Army National Guard soldiers

Casualties
- Deaths: 4
- Injuries: 100
- Arrested: 1,740

The 1967 Milwaukee riot was one of 159 race riots that swept cities in the United States during the "Long Hot Summer of 1967". In Milwaukee, African American residents, outraged by the slow pace in ending housing discrimination and police brutality, began to riot on the evening of July 30, 1967. The inciting incident was a fight between teenagers, which escalated into full-fledged rioting with the arrival of police. Within minutes, arson, looting, and sniping were occurring in the north side of the city, primarily the 3rd Street Corridor.

The city put a round-the-clock curfew into effect on July 31. The governor mobilized the National Guard to quell the disturbance that same day, and order was restored on August 3. Although the damage caused by the riot was not as destructive as in such cities as Detroit and Newark, many businesses in the affected neighborhoods were severely damaged. Tensions increased afterward between police and residents. The July disturbance also served as a catalyst to additional unrest in the city; equal housing marches held in August often turned violent as white residents clashed with Black demonstrators.

== Background ==
During the mid-1960s, there was race-related civil unrest in a number of major US cities, including riots in Harlem and Philadelphia in 1964; Los Angeles in 1965; and Cleveland and Chicago in 1966. During the summer of 1967, a total of 159 race riots broke out across the country in what would come to be known as the Long Hot Summer.

Milwaukee communities had long been segregated when Alderwoman Vel Phillips, the first woman and African American to hold the position, proposed the first fair housing (Note: see Housing discrimination in the United States) ordinance in March 1962. She continued to introduce fair housing proposals over the next five years. Four times they were defeated by the city council.

By the summer of 1967, tensions continued to escalate, and protests became increasingly common, including multiple demonstrations outside the private homes of the city's Aldermen. Mayor Henry Maier, the city council, and school board refused to address civil rights grievances, and relations between the police and the residents worsened. As historian Patrick Jones put it, "Blight had surrounded, and then devoured, the heart of Milwaukee's black community."

Recent uprisings in Newark and Detroit, which had broken out July 12 and 23 respectively, only served to make matters worse. (Note: See 1967 Detroit riot and 1967 Newark riots) LeRoy Jones, then one of 18 black police officers among the total of 2,056 officers in the city's department, described the situation:

There were some rumors that something was going to happen ... We did know there was going to be a riot. The Police Department knew - one to two weeks ahead - that something was planned. It was predicted that it would be on 3rd Street.

According to a study that was administered by Karl Flaming, over 95% of all local African Americans did not participate in this disturbance. A majority of the citizens that took part in this riot were young black men who lived in the inner core of Milwaukee. Of the participants, 35% were unemployed and 20% were classified as poor.

== Events ==
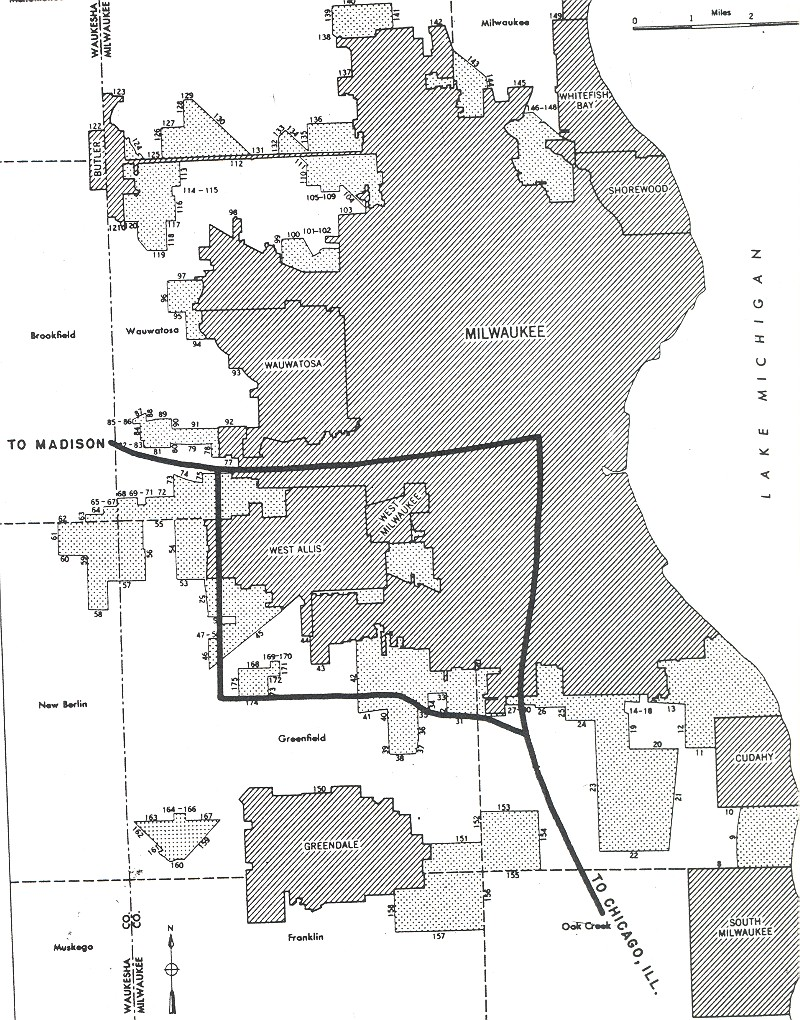
Map of Milwaukee, 1955

=== July 29 ===
Around midnight on the evening of July 29, a fight broke out between two Black women outside the St. Francis Social Center, on the corner of 4th and West Brown streets. A crowd of 350 spectators gathered, and when police arrived to respond to the disturbance, the crowd began to throw rocks at police vehicles. Soon more police came, dressed in riot gear. Some property damage was done but the crowd was quickly dispersed.

=== July 30 ===
The day of Sunday, July 30 was calm, but rumors spread and tensions grew.

A large crowd gathered that evening on 3rd Street. It is not clear what event started the outbreak, but at least one story circulated that police had assaulted a young boy. Squire Austin, who was at a civil rights rally, recalled, "The rumor we got ... was that police had beaten up a kid pretty bad over on Third and Walnut ... that's when the looting and firebombing started."

By 10:00 PM a crowd of 300 were throwing projectiles at stores owned by white residents, starting fires, and looting. The police reacted with violence, and the mob reacted in turn. More fights broke out around 3rd Street, and shootings were reported on Center Street. Along the area from West State street to West Burleigh street looting broke out, multiple shootings occurred, and more fires were set.

Just prior to midnight, the mayor went to City Hall to meet with Police Chief Harold Breier. Reports of the first fires came in, along with reports of dispatched firefighters being assailed by stones and prevented from extinguishing them. The mayor requested Governor Warren Knowles notify the Wisconsin National Guard to be on standby.

=== July 31 ===
Around 2 AM on July 31, in the area around North 2nd street and West Center street, iron worker Milton L. Nelsen was slowly driving through the mostly Black inhabited area while reportedly yelling racial slurs, when someone shouted "He's got a gun in the glove compartment." Shotgun fire came from a nearby house, and Nelsen was shot in the face. Hannah Jackson, a bystander, was also hit. The man who fired the gun, John Oraa Tucker, was later charged for the shooting, and maintained he did so out of fear for his and his family's safety. When police responded, officer Bryan Moschea was shot and killed when he entered a building thought to be the location of an unrelated sniper. His badly burned body was not able to be recovered until the following day. Four other officers were wounded. (Note: LeRoy Jones, Kenneth Hagopian, and John Carter among them) The body of Annie Mosley, aged 77, was found in the burned-out building. She had been shot in the head. Another woman, Willie Ella Green, aged 43, suffered a fatal heart attack running from her second story apartment.

The mayor received word of the shootings and fire at West Center at 2:26 AM. He declared a state of emergency, and imposed a citywide curfew, which took effect at 3:40 AM. At the Mayor's request, the National Guard was activated.

The mayor lifted the curfew from 4:00 PM to 6:00 PM. This resulted in a rush on downtown and suburban supermarkets. As the story in the Milwaukee Journal described it:

Grocery shopping Monday meant standing in long lines and waiting ... Shoppers came in families. Sometimes there were six adults in a car. They seemed to be shopping more from compulsion than need.

By the end of the day businesses, public transportation, utilities and educational institutions had all closed, and deliveries of milk and cattle to the city had halted.

=== August 1 onward ===
On August 1, Mayor Maier issued an order relaxing the curfew to only night hours. Some people began returning to work and some public services became available, at least partially. Police responded to reports that youths were lighting a paint store on fire. Clifford McKissick, aged 18, was shot in the neck and killed as he fled toward the nearby family home. The Milwaukee County's emergency hospital was closed and all personnel were transferred to the general hospital, which was farther away from the city, and deemed better capable of coping with the large number of casualties.

The Milwaukee Sentinel published a piece August 2 describing the plight of those who were restricted by the curfew, saying that they "were outside on their porches or standing next to their apartment buildings, watching. If they got too far away from their homes, though, police and guardsmen moved in."

On August 3 the mayor postponed the curfew from 7:00 PM to 9:00 PM.

On August 4 the mayor postponed the curfew from 9:00 PM to midnight, and announced that liquor stores and bars would be allowed to open and sell alcohol.

== Casualties and cost ==
In total, the riot resulted in three to four deaths (including at least one police officer), 100 injuries, and 1,740 arrests.

According to stories published by the Milwaukee Journal on August 2 and 4, more than $200,000 in window damage had been done to businesses, and the cost of mustering and paying the National Guard to intervene amounted to nearly $300,000.

== Aftermath ==
On August 3, 1967, an alliance of civil rights organizations and male priest held a dinner to tribute Father James Groppi and honor his contributions to the local struggle for racial equity in Milwaukee and the state of Wisconsin.

On August 27, 1967, the local NAACP, led by Father Groppi, held a march of about a hundred into a white neighborhood in protest of the city's housing laws. They came up against a crowd of 5,000 who retaliated with racial epithets, stones, and garbage. The following day Groppi addressed a meeting of supporters at St. Boniface Church, and prepared them for what was likely to come:

If there is any man or woman here who is afraid of going to jail for his freedom, is afraid of getting tear gassed, or is afraid of dying, you should not have come to this meeting tonight.

On August 29, the curfew was lifted and Groppi led 200 members of the Milwaukee NAACP on a march out of the ghetto and toward Kosciuszko Park, in an area predominately inhabited by white residents. The mob they met had grown to 13,000 and the protesters came under sniper fire as they returned to their headquarters. It was burned down later that night or early the next morning. The Mayor issued an order banning such demonstrations, and both Groppi and Phillips were arrested.

On September 4, Martin Luther King Jr. sent a telegram from Atlanta in support:

What you and your courageous associates are doing in Milwaukee will certainly serve as a kind of massive nonviolence that we need in this turbulent period. You are demonstrating that it is possible to be militant and powerful without destroying life or property. Please know that you have my support and my prayers.

On September 17, Groppi made an appearance on Face the Nation. This was televised on CBS.

In September, Dick Gregory had issued a formal boycott against Schlitz and many other brewing companies. On October 3, 200 demonstrators marched to Schlitz and Blatz brewery underline their protest. This was supposed to put pressure on the companies to gain support for open housing.

On April 8 of 1968, 15,000-20,000 participated in a memorial march in downtown Milwaukee.

On May 13, NAACP president and vice president Fred Bronson and Fortune Humphrey led 13 organizations and 450 people on a march to the Public Safety building to push for better police-community relations. A resolution was posted by Bronson and Humphrey that asked the mayor to lay off Chief Breier to "restore sanity" in police operations and to protect the black community from being controlled by a police force.

Groppi went on to lead 200 consecutive days of protests.

Father Groppi resigned as advisor to the YC in November 1968.

In 1968, Mayor Henry Maier was reelected for his 3rd term and received more than 80% of the total votes. This was the largest runaway victory that Milwaukee had ever seen.

On September 21, 1969, Groppi led a group of welfare mothers, low income African Americans, college students, Latinos and many others on a march from Milwaukee to Madison to protest the potential possibility of cuts for Wisconsin's state welfare budget.

=== Legal changes ===
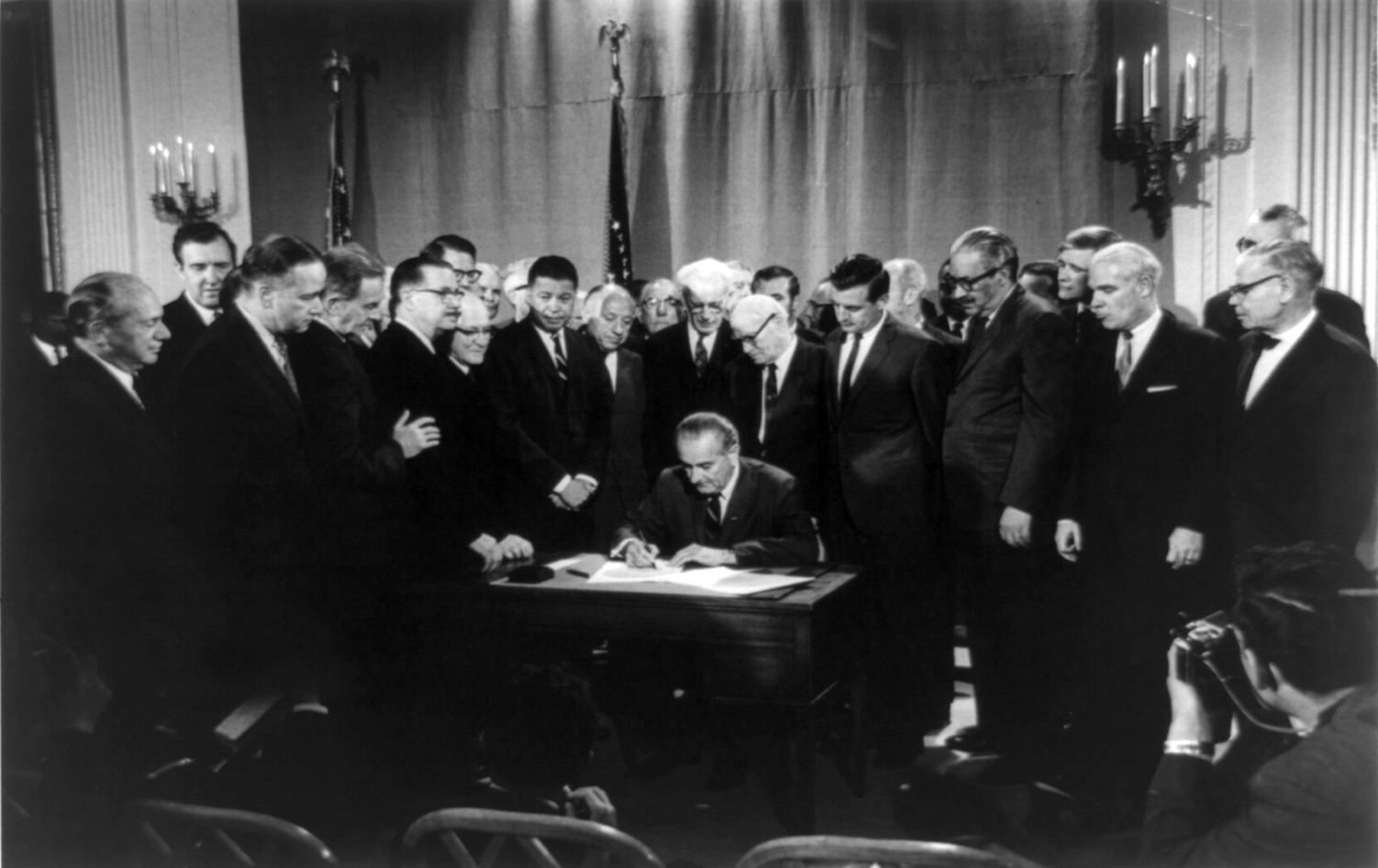
President Johnson signing the Civil Rights Act of 1968

In the immediate aftermath of the riot and marches, little was accomplished in the way of laws, policies, and programs. Speaking of the lack of available funding for enacting proposed reforms, Mayor Maier said:

The city of Milwaukee can no more finance the crucial problems of poverty, ignorance, disease and discrimination with the property taxes of relatively poor people than the city of Milwaukee can finance sending a man to the moon.

However, later that year the mayor rejected federal benefits, as they required support for fair housing in the city. He argued instead that the problem was a county-wide one. Support continued to grow for a housing measure, supported by the League of Women Voters and local workers unions. A petition circulated by supporters of fair housing garnered 8,000 signatures. A petition that opposed such legislation was presented to the city council with 27,000 signatures. In December, the city passed a form of fair housing that included enough exemptions, that it only applied to about a third of the housing in the city. Groppi dismissed it as "tokenism and crumbs". Phillips voted against the measure, saying it was "very much too late with very much too little".

On April 11, 1968, a week after the assassination of Martin Luther King Jr., the US Congress passed the Fair Housing Act, as part of the Civil Rights Act of 1968. Faced with capitulation, or the violation of federal law, the Milwaukee Common Council followed on April 30, passing an ordinance that was stronger than that required by the federal law. Casting a tie-breaking vote, council president Robert Jendusa said he hoped the measure might "heal some of the wounds of the community".

== Public opinion ==
According to Nesbit, the riots "widened the gap between militant blacks and other civil rights activists and the uncompromising white majority in the city." Thomson described the disparate interpretations of the event, emphasizing that blacks tended to view it as "a violent expression of the accumulated frustration and anger, undesirable but understandable", while whites believed it represented "the failure of black parents to control their children, irresponsible and rebellious individuals and the agitation of civil rights activists..." Blacks tended to see solutions in public reforms and the advancement of civil rights, while whites tended toward the need for increased policing and gun control.

In an article published August 1, 1967, by the Milwaukee Sentinel, an interview was reported with "John", an anonymous black rioter in his 20s:

He's (the white man) out there marching up and down with his guns. Why can't we march up and down with our guns? ... We went before (Mayor) Maier and we argued and argued and argued and argued and argued and it didn't do no good...

A study conducted by the Milwaukee Urban League found that, among blacks arrested during the riot, 90% cited "blocked job opportunities" as one of the root causes. The same study found that 53% of blacks arrested were unemployed or underemployed compared to 29% among blacks not participating in the riot. In another University of Wisconsin study, 54% of blacks interviewed reported that police brutality had a "great deal" to do with the riot. Another 55% felt that lack of respect and insults by police occurred frequently in the ghetto.

According to a research conducted by Jonathon Slesinger, 24% of inner city blacks described this event as a civil rights struggle, while 43% of inner city whites viewed it as a riot. Opinions on how to avoid future disturbances varied between white people and black people. For the white inner city respondents, 51% wanted to give police more power so suspicious people on streets would be stopped and get searched. Of the inner city Black respondents, 84% favored a proposal that would reduce racial disparity and provide more jobs for black people.

== Legacy ==
The Clifford McKissick Community School in Milwaukee was named for the Black youth killed by police on August 2 as part of the riot. In 1981, his family filed a civil lawsuit alleging excessive force on the part of officer Ralph Schroeder in the shooting death of McKissick. A Circuit Court ruled in favor of the officer and found that McKissick was responsible for his own death.

A year after the riots, John Oraa Tucker, a Shorewood High School janitor who lived in the house burned on the morning of July 31 (where Nelsen and a police officer were killed, among four others who were wounded) was charged with 9 counts of attempted murder. After the longest jury trial in Milwaukee County Court history (17 days of verdict deliberation) he was cleared on the most serious charges, but found guilty of endangering the safety of the public and given a 25-year sentence. He was paroled on July 1, 1977, just under 10 years into his sentence, and moved to Wausau, Wisconsin.

Asked about the events and his convictions in an interview two weeks after his release, Tucker remarked "As long as people's minds are in the past, it puts bumps and obstacles in the way of the future. It's been a long time. Let's forget about it."

In a 1970 case heard before the Wisconsin Supreme Court, Interstate Fire & Casualty Co. v Milwaukee, a company sought $506.93 in damages done to a tavern during the riots. In its decision siding with the city, the court wrote:

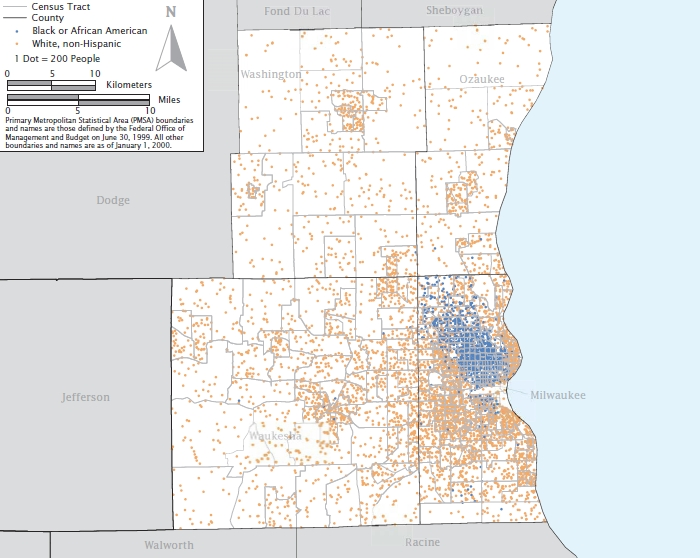
Residential black segregation as of the 2000 census

In this era of "confrontation politics", "protest marches", and "civil disobedience" it is naive to think that riot statues such as that before the court will retard such occurrences or keep them from developing into damaging riots, especially considering the spontaneity with which they occur.

In 1980, twelve years after the passage of Milwaukee's equal housing ordinance, the city ranked second nationally among the most racially segregated suburban areas. As of 2000, it was the most segregated city in the country according to data gathered by the US Census Bureau. In a July 2017 study by the Wall Street Journal of the nation's 100 largest metropolitan areas, Milwaukee was listed the 11th most segregated city.

== See also ==
- 2016 Milwaukee riots
- List of incidents of civil unrest in the United States
- Mass racial violence in the United States
