= 2016 Milwaukee riots =

Series of demonstrations against police brutality in southeast Wisconsin

- Date: August 13–15, 2016
- Location: Milwaukee, Wisconsin, U.S. North Sherman and West Auer; 43.077°N 87.9675°W
- Caused by: Fatal shooting of Sylville Smith by police
- Methods: Protests, rioting, looting, arson, shooting, assaults

Parties
Wisconsin; Wisconsin National Guard; City of Milwaukee; Milwaukee Police Department; Milwaukee Fire Department; Wisconsin Air National Guard	Local demonstrators Revolutionary Communist Party

Number
Initially 20–30	200+

Casualties, arrests, prosecution
- Deaths: 1
- Injuries: 10+
- Arrested: 41
- Charged: 5 demonstrators, 1 police officer

On August 13, 2016, a riot began in the Sherman Park neighborhood in Milwaukee, Wisconsin, sparked by the fatal police shooting of 23-year-old Sylville Smith. During the three-day turmoil, several people, including police officers, were injured and dozens of protesters arrested. A nightly curfew was set up for teenagers in the area.

Smith was running on foot and armed with a stolen handgun when he was shot. Video from the officer's bodycam showed that Smith had turned with the gun in his hand toward the officer just before the officer shot him.

Dominique Heaggan-Brown was criminally charged with Smith's death and acquitted at trial. This was the first homicide charge against a Milwaukee police officer in over a decade. A civil lawsuit was settled in 2020 for $4,000,000.

== Background ==
In 2014, community protests followed the fatal shooting of Dontre Hamilton, a Black man, in Milwaukee. The officer who shot and killed Hamilton was fired from the police force for not following protocol, but he was not criminally charged. In December 2014, the U.S. Department of Justice announced that it would work with the Milwaukee Police Department on reforms. Milwaukee police previously attracted controversy for two incidents involving the deaths of black suspects while in police custody—one in 2010 and the other in 2011—as well as a scandal involving illegal strip searches and body cavity searches of 74 black people, for which a $5 million settlement was approved by the Milwaukee Common Council. Residents have criticized policing methods in predominantly black neighborhoods, which they say often involve a lack of respect towards suspects and use of force.

On June 29, 2016, police in riot gear had to respond to unrest in Sherman Park, near 39th and Burleigh, a block away from the August incident. Rioters smashed windows and threw rocks at police. A BP gas station had been a frequent flash-point for unrest during June and July 2016, with several incidents taking place there, including a murder. Later, it would be looted and set on fire during the August 13 riot.

The shooting of Sylville Smith occurred during a violent weekend in Milwaukee, with nine other shootings, five of them homicides, occurring within the preceding nine hours from August 12 to August 13. Two of the crime scenes were located a few blocks away from the police shooting.

=== Influence of inequality ===
Several reports and Milwaukee residents have connected the riots to a history of segregation and discrimination in Milwaukee.

Black residents, who make up about 40 percent of the city's population, have higher rates of unemployment, violent crime, incarceration, lack of education, and lower incomes than white residents. The poverty difference between black and white citizens is about one-and-a-half times the national average, and according to the Economic Policy Institute, Milwaukee has the nation's highest black unemployment rate.

One resident, Sharlen Moore, said:

It's a series of things that has happened over a period of time. And right now you shake a soda bottle and you open the top and it explodes, and this is what it is.

== Initial police shooting ==
At about 3:30 p.m. on August 13, 2016, two 23-year-old men were pulled over by two officers for suspicious activity while driving through the neighborhood. Both men fled on foot. One, who was armed with a semi-automatic handgun carrying 23 rounds, was later shot twice, in the right arm and chest, by one of the officers, and died at the scene. The man's handgun, along with 500 additional rounds of ammunition, had been reported stolen during a March burglary in nearby Waukesha. The second man was later apprehended and put into police custody. The deceased man, later identified as Sylville Smith, was shot about 20 seconds after the traffic stop was conducted.

=== People involved ===
==== Sylville Smith ====
Sylville K. Smith (April 11, 1993 – August 13, 2016) had two sisters, and a two-year-old son. According to his grandfather, Smith had cognitive and mental health issues, needing to take special education classes in elementary and middle school. He also started carrying a gun on his person after being shot at or robbed several times in separate incidents.

According to the police department, Smith had a "lengthy arrest record" dating back to at least 2011. He had been arrested or ticketed eight times for robbery, carrying a concealed weapon, theft, heroin possession, and other crimes. On February 3, 2015, he had been charged with felony first-degree "reckless endangering safety", in relation to a shooting at a party on August 24, 2014. This charge was followed by felony witness intimidation, when Smith attempted, through his girlfriend, to get the victim to sign a letter recanting his account. Both charges were dismissed after the victim willingly recanted his story. Smith's family said he had, at some point, filed a lawsuit against the Milwaukee Police Department, but no evidence of such a suit—settled or pending—was found in state or federal court.

==== Dominique Heaggan-Brown ====
Dominique Heaggan-Brown (born c. 1992) joined the police force in 2010 as an aide and then graduated from its academy three years later. He was wearing a body camera at the time of the shooting, as were two other officers at the scene. Heaggan-Brown is African American, and his name was initially withheld by police officials as "there are concerns for his safety". He was identified by the public on August 16 after at least 3,000 people shared a Facebook image of him, with some adding threatening comments; the post was deleted by Milwaukee police shortly after.

On August 14, Milwaukee Police Chief Edward A. Flynn said Heaggan-Brown's "body camera showed Smith had turned toward the officer with a gun in his hand". Heaggan-Brown was placed on administrative duty following the shooting, as is standard protocol in the city police department.

Heaggan-Brown was described by residents as an "aggressive" officer who was not well-liked in the community. According to one of Smith's sisters, Sherelle, Heaggan-Brown had known her brother in high school. An unnamed law enforcement source confirmed that both men had attended Casimir Pulaski High School together. Sherelle Smith also said that Heaggan-Brown was jealous of Smith's popularity and would often harass him because of it.

On October 31, Heaggan-Brown was fired from the force after allegations of committing several drugging and rapes. When one rape victim was taken to the hospital over fear of an overdose Heaggan-Brown texted another officer regarding how best to keep the incident quiet.

In 2018, Heaggan-Brown was sentenced to three years in prison after pleading guilty to three counts of soliciting prostitution, two counts of obtaining someone’s image without their consent, and pleading no contest to false imprisonment.

== Riots ==
=== August 13 ===
According to Tom Barrett, the first riot was "driven" by the protesters' social media messages encouraging to congregate in the area.

Between 8:00 and 9:00 p.m., hours after the shooting, a group of around 100 black protesters gathered near the scene at North Sherman and Auer to hold a protest, and confronted a line of 20–30 officers. Some of the protesters used social media to encourage others to participate in the demonstration. At some point, the protest turned violent. The Revolutionary Communist Party confirmed that some of its members were among the protesters and that they traveled to Milwaukee to "support a revolution" but did not intend to incite violence.

Several cars, including police squad cars, were set alight and a BP gas station was looted and set on fire as well. When additional officers dressed in riot gear arrived, gunshots were heard. Firefighters were initially unable to put out the gas station fire due to reports of shots being fired, but eventually extinguished the flames. The Milwaukee Fire Department reported that bricks were thrown at one of their trucks. One officer was treated at a hospital for injuries sustained after being hit by a brick. The protesters also attacked reporters and a photographer documenting the incident. One reporter was shoved to the ground and physically assaulted.

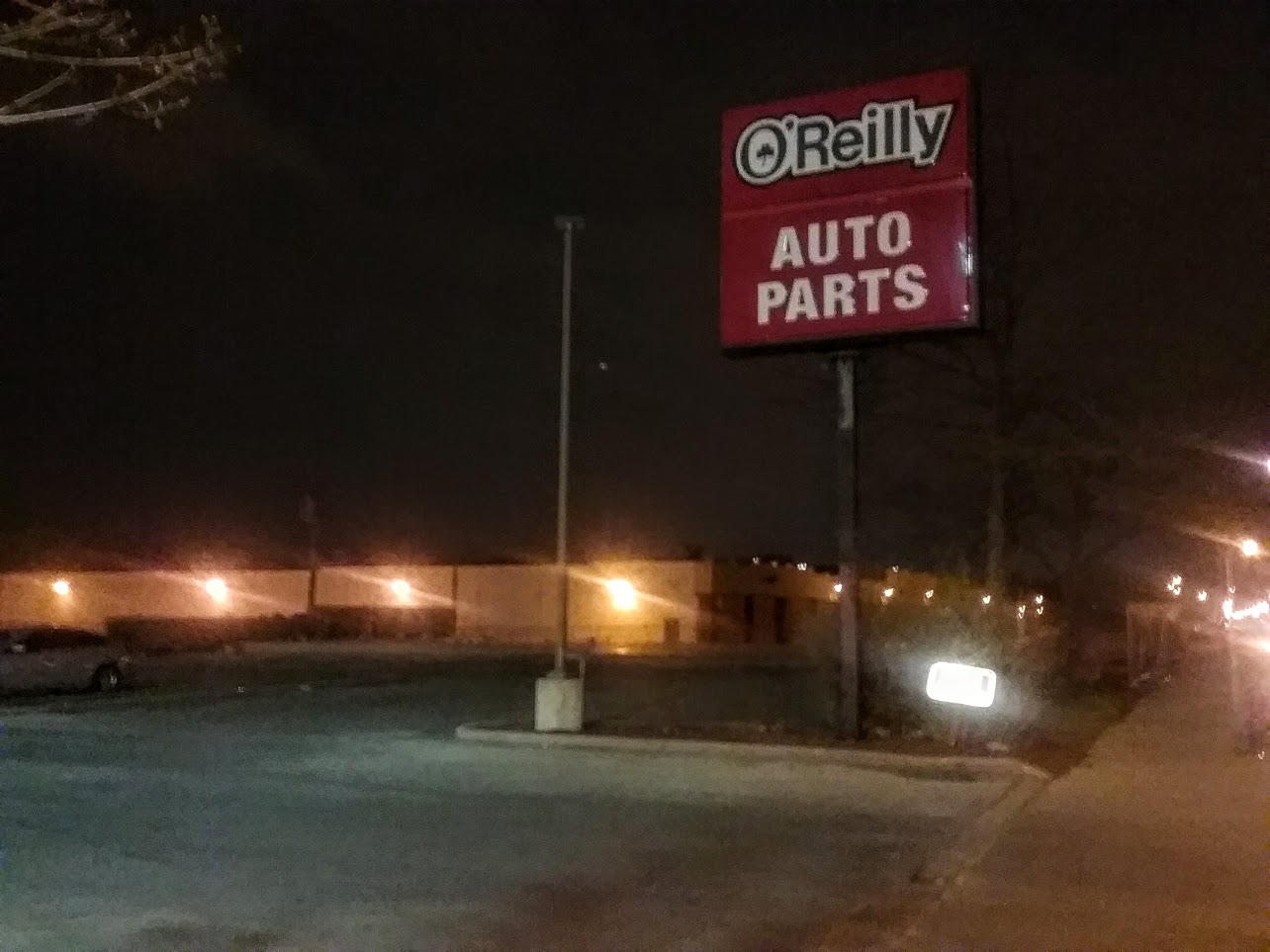
This O'Reilly Auto Parts shop was one of the buildings set on fire.

An O'Reilly Auto Parts shop, a beauty supply store, and the local branch of BMO Harris Bank were also set on fire in the area. A MetroPCS store was among the businesses that were looted. A supermarket and a liquor store were destroyed during the rioting, as well.

In total, four police officers were treated for injuries during the riot and seventeen people were arrested.

=== August 14 ===
In the early hours of August 14, Mayor Barrett and other local officials urged residents at a press conference to help restore order. Barrett also urged residents to bring home any of their children who may be among the protesters. During the day, volunteers assisted police in cleaning up debris left by the riot. In the afternoon, about 100 people, mostly black, held a peaceful demonstration in front of the O'Reilly Auto Parts shop that had been burned during the riot. The crowd moved to the local police station and held their arms up in the air as a form of protest.

More unrest occurred on the night of August 14. About two dozen officers in riot gear responded to the scene. Protesters threw objects at officers and a person was shot in the neck near the site of the disturbance. Police had to use an armored vehicle to retrieve the victim from the crowd. The victim was then taken to the hospital for treatment. A police officer was also injured and treated when a rock smashed into a patrol car windshield.

=== August 15 ===
Protests continued on the early hours of August 15. Demonstrators were reported to have thrown objects and fired shots shortly after midnight. Chief Edward Flynn said that the department's ShotSpotter system recorded a total of 30 instances of gunfire on the night of August 14.

By the morning of August 15, fourteen more people were arrested and four police officers were wounded, including the one hit by the rock smashing a windshield. A 10:00 p.m. curfew was announced for teenagers. Three police cars and a BearCat vehicle were damaged, another vehicle and a dumpster were set on fire, and a store had its windows broken. The night of August 15 was relatively peaceful, with no property damage being reported. A few heated confrontations did occur, but were calmed down after six people were arrested.

== Police shooting investigation ==
An investigation into the police shooting was initiated by the Wisconsin Department of Justice. Smith's autopsy was released on August 15, confirming authorities' account of the shooting that he was shot twice: once in the right arm and once in the chest. City officials refused to release the police body camera video showing Smith's shooting pending the approval of the state Department of Justice. However, Barrett urged state officials to release the video as soon as possible, hoping it would placate protesters. On August 23, Wisconsin Attorney General Brad Schimel said that releasing the video soon "would compromise the integrity of the investigation" and that it will not be unless charges are filed.

After the first shot was fired, the video reportedly shows Smith throwing his gun away and falling, in a half-backwards roll, to the ground on his back, unarmed, with his legs and arms moving towards his head. He was alive when the second shot fatally struck him in the chest rupturing his heart and a lung. 1.69 seconds elapsed between the shots. Heaggan-Brown testified that Smith was reaching for his waist when the second shot was fired. However, the video allegedly shows that Smith was never searched for a second firearm by the officers.

== Prosecution ==
=== Criminal prosecution of Heaggan-Brown ===
On December 15, 2016, ex-officer Dominique Heaggan-Brown was charged with first-degree reckless homicide stemming from Smith's death "under circumstances showing utter disregard for human life", as defined by Wisconsin state law.

During his first court appearance, on December 16, Heaggan-Brown wore protective clothing to prevent self-harm. His bail was set at $100,000.

On December 23, Heaggan-Brown pleaded not guilty to the charge.

On April 10, 2017, the court ruled that the trial must be held in Milwaukee County, and that the jurors will be chosen from that county. The judge thereby denied the defense's motion for a venue change and refuted the argument that pre-trial publicity, alleged anti-police sentiment, and prior police-involved shootings might prevent the defendant from getting a fair trial.

Jury selection started on June 12 and concluded the next day. As the selection began, the court mandated that the jury be sequestered and that the jurors, both potential and actual, remain anonymous except to the prosecutors and defense. According to the district attorney, jury sequestration had not taken place in Milwaukee County for at least 23 years. The jurors in Heaggan-Brown's case were asked to stay in a hotel for the duration of the trial.

Opening statements took place on June 13. During the trial, prosecutors argued that the second shot fired by Heaggan-Brown was unjustifiable since Smith was already on the ground gun-free, wounded and therefore unable to escape or resist, so the officer's fear for his life was unfounded. The defense countered that, in firing the second shot, Heaggan-Brown followed a police protocol to assume that if a person has one weapon, he might have another. On June 20, closing arguments were delivered and jury deliberations began.

On June 21, 2017, Heaggan-Brown was acquitted.

=== Civil litigation ===
The civil lawsuit filed on June 21, 2017, by Sylville Smith's family sought compensatory damages and attorney fees from Dominique Heaggan-Brown and the city of Milwaukee, as well as punitive damages from Heaggan-Brown. The 8-count federal lawsuit was brought in the United States Eastern District of Wisconsin.

On October 28, 2020, the city of Milwaukee and the family of Sylville Smith agreed to settle the ongoing lawsuit for $4 million. The approved settlement will cost the city about $480,000 each year for ten years.

== Estimated damage ==
According to a Milwaukee Fire Department official, the riots caused around $5.8 million worth of damage to the neighborhood businesses. This "rough estimate" includes commercial real estate damage, as well as lost merchandise. At least seven businesses were affected.

The ATF offered a $10,000 reward for information on the perpetrators of the arson fires set during the riots.

== Reactions ==
=== Political ===
Following the August 13 riot, Governor Scott Walker, under the threat of another riot in Milwaukee, declared a state of emergency in Milwaukee and put the National Guard on standby. President Barack Obama was briefed on the situation.

=== Police ===
Chief Edward Flynn praised faith and community leaders for their efforts in curbing the violence on August 14, and assigned blame of the riots to members of the Revolutionary Communist Party, saying they organized additional protesters, which turned the initial protests violent.

Milwaukee County Sheriff David Clarke wrote a controversial op-ed for The Hill, in which he blamed the riots on President Obama and liberals.

=== Smith's family ===
One of Smith's sisters, Kimberly Neal, urged protesters to stand down, saying violence was not the answer. Conversely, another sister, Sherelle Smith, encouraged protesters to focus the riots on suburban neighborhoods and burn them down. Sherelle Smith's encouragement of violence in the suburbs was controversially edited out of initial online and televised reports by CNN, which were later updated to include her full statement.

Smith's father, Patrick Smith, acknowledged having been a "bad role model" to his son, and urged other parents to become better role models for their children.

== See also ==
- 1967 Milwaukee riot
- List of incidents of civil unrest in the United States
