= Robert Wason Jr. =

American politician

Robert Wason Jr. was an American politician from Granville, Wisconsin who served a single one-year term in 1849 in the 2nd Wisconsin Legislature representing the 7th Milwaukee County Assembly district (the towns of Granville, Wauwatosa, and Milwaukee, succeeding Perley J. Shumway. He was assigned to the standing committee on medical societies (a type of trade association for medical professionals), and medical colleges. Like Shumway, he was a Democrat. He was succeeded in the next Assembly by Samuel Brown, a Freesoiler.

In 1857, he was a Milwaukee County deputy sheriff, as well as being the county's jailer and coroner. By 1868, he was the purchasing agent for the Milwaukee & St. Paul Railroad.
