= Massachusetts Executive Office of Public Safety and Security =

Government organization in Massachusetts

The Massachusetts Executive Office of Public Safety and Security is a Commonwealth of Massachusetts organization whose focus is the protection of individuals, groups or environment issues which will, subsequently, affect individuals or groups health or well being. As an executive agency, the Office is managed by a Commissioner who is appointed by the Governor.

== Department of Public Safety ==
The Department of Public Safety (DPS), a regulatory, licensing and inspection agency, charged with the oversight of numerous activities, businesses, and professions, reports directly to the secretary of the Executive Office of Public Safety and Security. The Department of Public Safety provides administrative and legal assistance to the following boards and commissions.

=== The Architectural Access Board: (AAB) ===
A regulatory agency within the Massachusetts Office of Public Safety. Its legislative mandate states that it shall develop and enforce regulations designed to make public buildings accessible to, functional for, and safe for use by persons with disabilities

=== Amusements ===
All amusement devices in Massachusetts must be licensed and are regulated and inspected by the Department of Public Safety Each amusement device, including inflatable devices, must be registered with the Department annually and inspected according to the regulations.

=== Board of Building Regulations and Standards ===
The Department of Public Safety’s Board of Building Regulations and Standards (BBRS) requires an individual who supervises building construction for certain building types to be licensed as a Construction Supervisor. Candidates for the Construction Supervisor License (CSL) must first demonstrate at least 3 years of experience in building construction or design in order to be considered eligible for the exam. BBRS is authorized by law to adopt building code regulations, administer provisions of the code and operate various construction related programs.

=== Board of Elevator Regulations ===
A division of the state public safety department, The Board of Elevator Regulations, has eight members who are appointed to serve by the Governor of the Commonwealth of Massachusetts. The Board of Elevator Regulations regulates the construction, installation, alteration and operation of all elevators in Massachusetts. The term “elevator” includes moving stairways, dumbwaiters, moving walkways, material lifts, vertical reciprocating conveyors, and dumbwaiters with automatic transfer devices, wheelchair lifts, automatic people movers and other associated devices that are commonly included within the elevator industry. All elevator constructors, maintenance people, repairpeople, and operators must be licensed by the Board.

=== Engineering ===
The Engineering division is responsible for the inspection of boilers, pressure vessels, and other equipment or devices for conformance to safety laws, standards, rules and regulations. The inspectors of this division are also responsible for the safe operation of amusement rides, horse-drawn carriages, and bungee jumping. In addition to ensuring compliance with safety laws, rules and regulations, it is the responsibility of the inspectors to examine people for the following licenses: Power plant engineers and firemen, oil burner technicians, refrigeration technicians, heavy equipment and hoisting operators, sprinkler fitters, pipe fitters, nuclear power plant operators.

=== Trenches ===
In addition to the permit and local permitting authority requirements mandated by statute, the trench safety regulations require that all excavators, whether public or private, take specific precautions to protect the general public and prevent unauthorized access to unattended trenches. Accordingly, unattended trenches must be covered, barricaded or backfilled.

=== Licensing ===
The Department of Public Safety issues licenses in the following areas: Amusement and Entertainment, Architectural Access Board, Change of Address Form, Concrete Field Testing Technician, Construction Supervisor License, Elevators, Engineers, Hoisting, Inspector of Pressure, Vessel License, Native Lumber Producers, Nuclear Plants, Oil Burners, Pipe Fitters, Public Warehouse, Refrigeration, S-License (Security), Sprinklers, Tramways, Inspection Applications, and Ticket Resellers.
