= Milwaukee Police Department =

Police department for the city of Milwaukee, Wisconsin

Coordinates: 43°02′34″N 87°55′16″W

- Shoulder Patch
- Abbreviation: MPD

Agency overview
- Formed: September 3, 1855
- Employees: 2,305
- Annual budget: $297 million (2020)

Jurisdictional structure
- Legal jurisdiction: Municipal

Operational structure
- Headquarters: Police Administration Building; 749 W. State Street; Milwaukee, Wisconsin
- Sworn members: ▼1,581 of 1,725 (2025)
- Agency executive: Jeffrey B. Norman, Chief

Facilities
- Stations: 7: District 1; District 2; District 3; District 4; District 5; District 6; District 7; Specialized Patrol Division
- Police boats: 2

Website
- city.milwaukee.gov/police

The Milwaukee Police Department (MPD) is the police department organized under the city of Milwaukee, Wisconsin. The department has a contingent of about 1,800 sworn officers when at full strength and is divided into seven districts. Jeffrey B. Norman is the current chief of police, serving since December 2020.

== History ==
MPD was founded in 1855. At the time, Milwaukee had an extremely high crime rate, fueled by local gangs, mobs, thieves and robbers. Milwaukee was originally served by the Milwaukee County Sheriff's Office, which became increasingly unable to provide adequate enforcement to the growing city. With burgeoning crime rates, citizens enacted an ordinance creating the Milwaukee Police Department.

Milwaukee's first chief of police was William Beck, a former NYPD detective, and its first policemen were Fred Keppler, John Hardy, George Fische, James Rice, L.G. Ryan and David Coughlin. As the department expanded, patrolmen were supplemented by "roundsmen", who would lead the patrolmen out to their beats at the beginning of the evening shift, and supervise them during the shift. A roundsman earned $5 more a month than a patrol officer.

The office of police chief, like the department in general, was subject to political forces for most of its history; for example, in 1878 new Mayor John Black appointed fellow Democrat Daniel Kennedy as chief, and Kennedy promptly fired 25 Republican patrolmen (as part of the spoils system then prevalent).

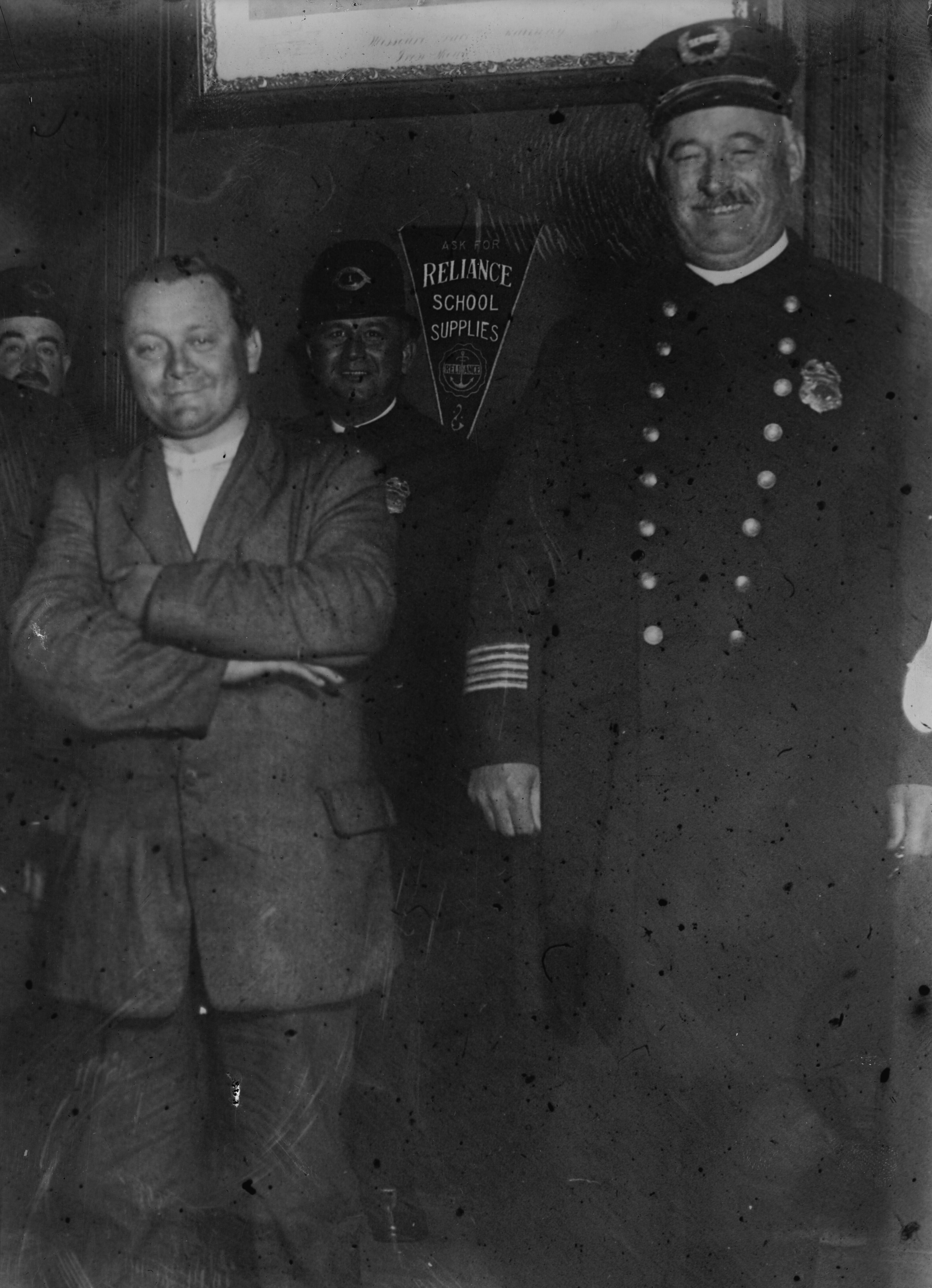
John Schrank in Milwaukee Police Custody October 1912

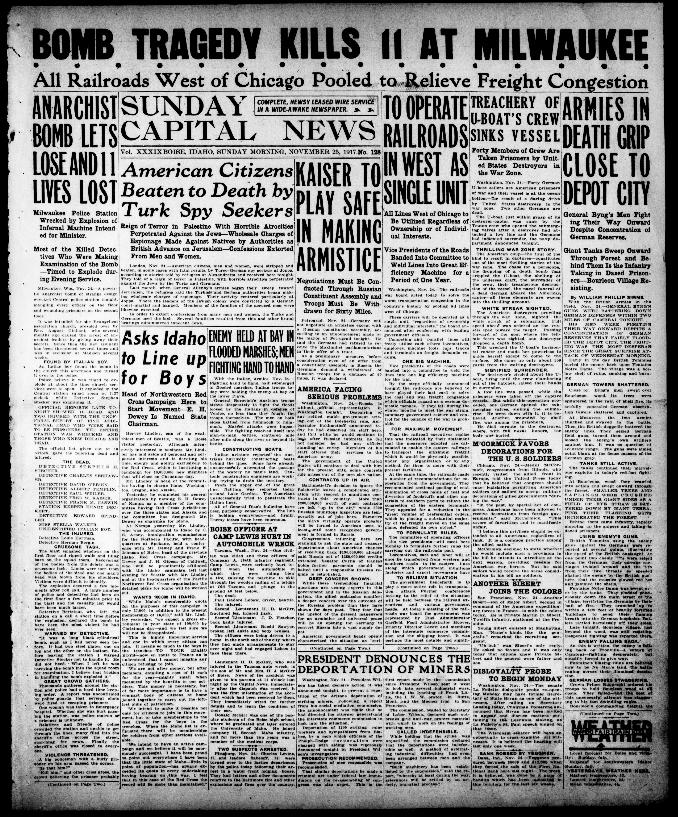
Milwaukee Police Department bombing November 24, 1917

In 1924, Judson W. Minor became the department's first African-American officer and in 1975 Ada Wright became the first female MPD officer. On November 15, 1996, Arthur Jones became the first African-American chief. A lawsuit filed after his term found that Jones discriminated against officers based on their race, giving African-American officers promotions before European-American officers.

=== 1917 bombing ===
On November 24, 1917, a large black powder bomb, wrapped as a package, was discovered by Maude L. Richter, a social worker, next to an evangelical church in the third ward. She dragged the package into the church basement and notified the church janitor, Sam Mazzone. Mazzone brought the bomb to the central police station at Oneida and Broadway and turned it over to police. The station keeper was showing it to the shift commander, Lieutenant Flood, right before a scheduled inspection, when it exploded.

Nine members of the department were killed in the blast, along with a female civilian. It was suspected at the time that the bomb had been placed outside the church by anarchists, particularly the Galleanist faction led by adherents of Luigi Galleani. At the time, the bomber's identity was not uncovered. Many years later, interviews with surviving Galleanist members revealed that Croatian national Mario Buda, chief bombmaker for the Galleanists, may have constructed the Milwaukee bomb.

At the time, the bombing was the most fatal single event in national law enforcement history, only surpassed later by the September 11 attacks on September 11, 2001, when 72 law enforcement officers representing eight different agencies were killed. Those responsible for the 1917 bombing never were apprehended, but days later, eleven alleged Italian anarchists went to trial on unrelated charges involving a fracas that had occurred two months before. The specter of the larger, uncharged crime of the bombing haunted the proceedings and assured convictions of all eleven. In 1918 Clarence Darrow led an appeal that gained freedom for most of the convicted.

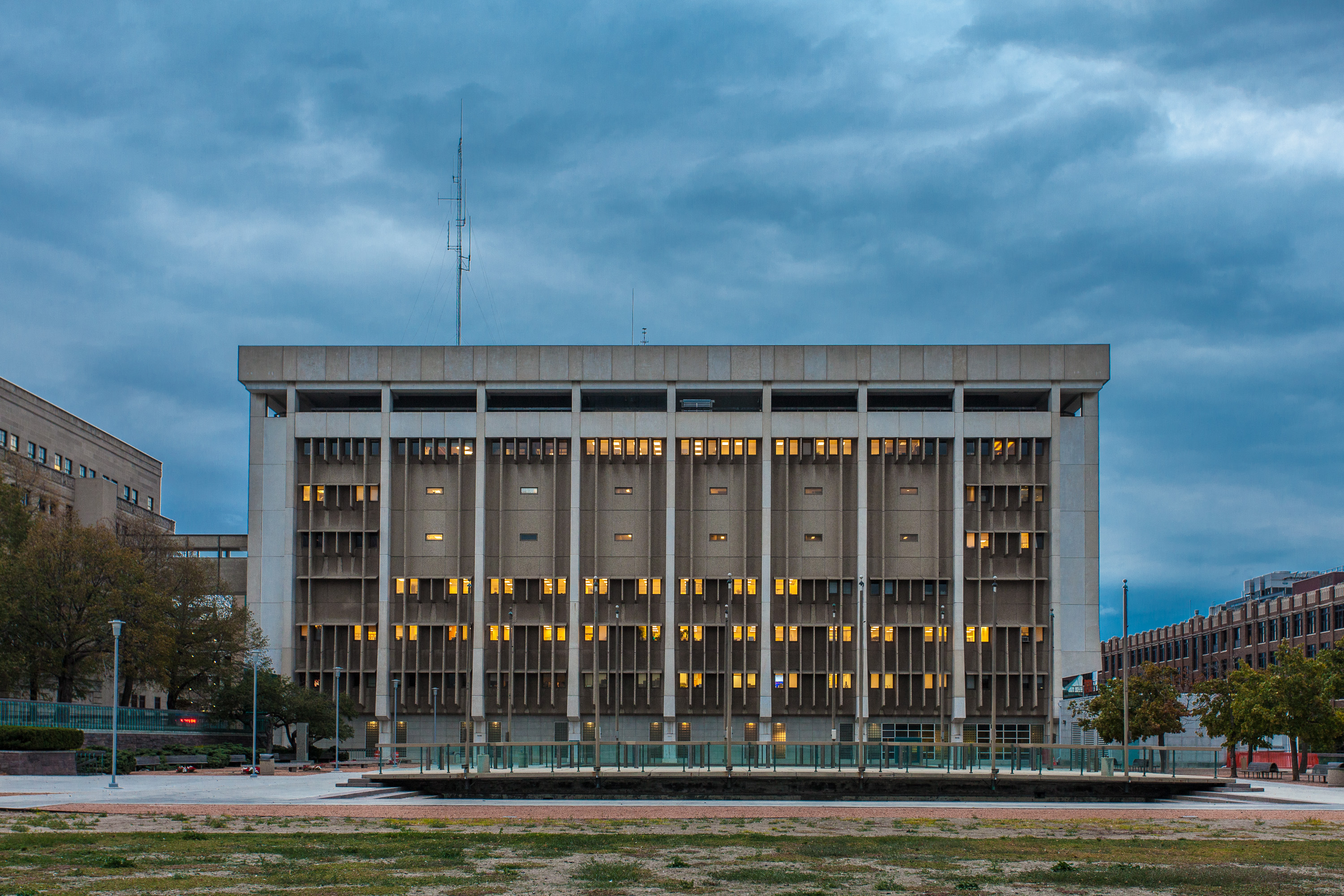
Police Administration Building- Headquarters of the Milwaukee Police Department

=== 1917–1999 ===
According to an investigation by the federal Department of Justice, in the second half of the 1970s, 22 people died while in the custody of the Milwaukee police.

In September 1990, the department established a canine unit composed of six German shepherd dogs and six handler officers.

=== 21st century ===
Milwaukee Police Department station in Washington Heights

The first female captain in the Milwaukee Police Department was Nannette Hegerty, who also became the first female chief of police in 2004. She retired in November 2007.

== Controversy ==
The Milwaukee Police Department has a history of racism, particularly targeting the Black community in Milwaukee.

=== Killing of Daniel Bell ===
In 1958, Officer Thomas Grady shot Daniel Bell in the back, killing him. Investigations at the time cleared Grady of any wrongdoing. In 1978, Grady's partner indicated that the officer had planted a knife on Bell's body to falsely indicate he had been armed. Grady pleaded guilty to reckless homicide and perjury. Milwaukee city officials, unwilling to pay the sum awarded to the Bell family, appealed and repeatedly refused the family's offers to settle for smaller sums. In September 1984, the U.S. Court of Appeals in Chicago awarded $1.6 million, twice the amount the family had offered to settle for earlier.

=== Lawrencia "Bambi" Bembenek ===
On May 28, 1981, police officer Lawrencia Bembenek murdered her husband's ex-wife. Her conviction, escape, and subsequent court proceedings received substantial media attention.

=== Killing of Ernest Lacy ===
On July 9, 1981, 22-year-old Ernest Lacy died after an officer put his knee on Lacy's back or neck, causing him to die from lack of oxygen a short time later. Afterwards, one officer was fired and the four were suspended.

=== Return of Konerak Sinthasomphone to Jeffrey Dahmer ===
In the early morning hours of May 27, 1991, 14-year-old Konerak Sinthasomphone (the younger brother of a boy Dahmer had molested) was discovered on the street, wandering nude. Reports of the boy's injuries varied. Jeffrey Dahmer, who had drugged and raped the boy, told police that they had an argument while drinking, and that Sinthasomphone was his 19-year-old lover. Against the teenager's protests, police turned him over to Dahmer. The officers later reported smelling a strange odor, which was eventually found to be bodies in the back of his house. Later that night Dahmer killed and dismembered Sinthasomphone, keeping his skull as a souvenir. Dahmer went on to kill four more people.

John Balcerzak and Joseph Gabrish, the two police officers who returned Sinthasomphone to Dahmer, were fired from the Milwaukee Police Department after their actions were widely publicized, including an audiotape of the officers making homophobic statements to their dispatcher and laughing about having reunited the "lovers." The two officers appealed their termination, and were reinstated with back pay. Balcerzak would go on to be elected president of the Milwaukee Police Association in May 2005. Gabrish went on to be captain of the Grafton Police Department before retiring in 2019, as well as the chief of police for the town of Trenton, Wisconsin, 30 miles north of Milwaukee.

=== Chicago shootings ===
In 1994, two Milwaukee police officers, Gabriel Bedoya and John Koch, went on a shooting spree in the city of Chicago. They fired shots at random into buildings on the Gold Coast of Chicago, including the residence of Cardinal Joseph Bernardin. When denied entry to a nightclub, Bedoya shot the bouncer at close range in the head, killing him, and the two fled back to Milwaukee.

=== Beating of Frank Jude Jr. ===
In October 2004, Frank Jude Jr. attended a party held by police officer Andrew Spengler. Following allegations that Jude had taken an officer's badge, at least three officers confronted and beat Jude outside of Spengler's home. Officers Daniel Masarik, Andrew Spengler and Jon Bartlett were arrested and charged with the beating. All three were later fired from the Milwaukee Police Department, as were several other involved officers. The officers disciplined were both on- and off-duty the night of the beating.

Masarik, Spengler and Bartlett were later found not guilty in state court. In July 2007, these three officers and another officer, Ryan Packard, went on trial in federal court on charges of violating the civil rights of Frank Jude Jr. and his friend, Levelle Harris. Spengler, Masarik and Bartlett were found guilty; Packard was found not guilty. The officers were sentenced on November 29, 2007. Bartlett received 17 years, Masarik and Spengler both received 15 years.

The officers' attorneys have said the officers will appeal the sentences.

=== Shooting of Alfonzo Glover ===
In March 2005, press reports recount that Officer Alfonzo Glover shot Wilbert Prado eight times, killing him, after an off-duty traffic altercation. Charges were filed on Officer Glover, but he committed suicide before he could be brought to court.

=== Ladmarald Cates ===
Officer Ladmarald Cates was convicted in January 2012 of the 2010 rape of a 19-year-old mother and was sentenced to 24 years in prison.

=== Death of Derek Williams ===
On July 6, 2011, 22-year-old Derek Williams died in the back of a squad car after he complained that he couldn't breathe. As he complained about his breathing, one officer accused Williams of "playing games". A total of 11 officers heard Williams complaints and ignored them. All of the officers that were involved were cleared of any wrongdoing and Williams' family received $2 million in a lawsuit.

=== Accidental shooting ===
In November 2011, Officer Michael Edwards was in a shopping mall food court when his handgun accidentally discharged, causing a piece of debris to injure a bystander. Edwards contacted mall security immediately and was cooperative with the investigation. Greendale Police, who investigated the incident, noted that it was a freak accident. Edwards pleaded guilty to a reduced charge of disorderly conduct.

=== Beating of handcuffed suspects ===
In May 2012, Officer Richard Schoen, a veteran of nine years' service was fired when footage from his car's camera showed him beating a woman handcuffed in the back of his car.

Later in the year, the city's Fire and Police Commission forced the department to rehire the officer. Public outrage forced the commission to change their decision.

=== Strip searches ===
In March 2012, a number of police officers were investigated for conducting strip searches in public on people they had arrested. In October 2012, Officer Michael Vagnini was charged with 25 counts of sexual assault and other crimes, Officer Jeffrey Dollhop was accused two counts of official misconduct and one count each of conducting an illegal strip search and an illegal cavity search, and two other officers, Jacob Knight and Brian Kozelek, each faced a single count of official misconduct. In October 2013, Dollhopf and Kozelek pleaded no contest in exchange for a sentence of fines and community service. In December 2013, Officer Vagnini was sentenced to 26 months in prison.

Six officers were investigated for obstructing the inquiry into these illegal strip searches. To prevent collusion by the officers, the court issued an order preventing discussion of the strip searches. In 2012, five officers were suspected of violating this court order soon after they were subpoenaed to testify at a secret fact-finding hearing. Despite video and document proof of having broken laws and violating department policies, these officers did not face criminal charges or departmental disciplining. Officer Stephanie Seitz was investigated for perjury, but Chief Deputy District Attorney Kent Lovern declined to charge her with a crime.

=== Killing of Dontre Hamilton ===
On April 30, 2014, a police officer, Christopher Manney, fatally shot and killed Dontre Hamilton, a 31-year-old African-American man who had been resting in downtown Milwaukee's Red Arrow Park. Police say Hamilton was shot 14 times after he struggled with an officer, took the officer's baton, and hit the officer in the head. Witness accounts differ, and some stated they never saw Dontre strike Manney with the baton.

When Manney responded to the scene he was unaware that two Milwaukee police officers had twice responded to a call from one of the park's Starbucks employees and had performed a wellness check on Hamilton. During MPD's investigation following the incident, the department learned that Hamilton was a diagnosed paranoid schizophrenic.

Police Chief Edward Flynn fired Manney in October, saying he had violated department policy regarding a pat-down. Manney tried to rejoin the Milwaukee Police Department, but his appeal was unanimously denied by the Milwaukee Fire and Police Commission members in March 2015, and his firing was upheld. The district attorney, finding the use of force to be in self-defense, declined to prosecute.

=== Shooting of Jerry Smith Jr ===
On August 31, 2017, 19-year-old Jerry Smith Jr was shot & wounded by two officers on the rooftop of an apartment building near 29th and Wisconsin Avenue. Officers Adam Stahl and Melvin Finkley had responded to a call of man with a gun at the building. Smith fled officers as they approached to talk to him. One of the officers thought he saw a gun-shaped object in Smith's pants, and that Smith was trying to secure it as he ran. Smith stated that he was trying to surrender. While Smith was getting on the ground, Stahl and Finkley shot smith at close range three times. No weapon was found near Smith. The wounds caused partial paralysis in his right leg.

In February 2022, Smith, who sued the city of Milwaukee, would be given a $650,000 settlement from the city of Milwaukee following approval from the City Common Council and Mayor.

=== Milwaukee Bucks player Sterling Brown ===
On January 26, 2018, Sterling Brown was tased and arrested inappropriately according to the Milwaukee Police Department Police Chief Alfonso Morales the following May. Brown brought suit in June 2018 after the May release of bodycam footage and alleges racial profiling occurred in the administration of a parking ticket at a Walgreens parking lot. In October 2019, Brown rejected a $400,000 settlement offer. Brown has expressed that he has rejected the offer in part due to his ability and sense of responsibility to use his platform as an NBA player to raise awareness. November 27, 2019, court filings indicated that a federal civil rights lawsuit is proceeding to trial.

On May 4, 2021, the Milwaukee Common would unanimously approve a $750,000 settlement for Brown. In addition, the settlement agreement also required the city of Milwaukee to commit to changes regarding the city police department's standard operating procedures, such as fair and impartial policing, training and career development, personnel investigations and body cameras.

=== Killing of Joel Acevedo ===
25-year-old Joel Acevedo died on April 25, 2020, six days after being put in a choke hold for 11 minutes and 20 seconds by off-duty officer Michael Mattioli while at a party at Mattioli's home. Mattioli was later arrested and charged with first degree reckless homicide. On November 10, 2023, a jury would find Mattioli not guilty of first degree reckless homicide. On March 6, 2026, a federal civil rights lawsuit against Mattioli was dismissed by U.S. federal Judge Brett Ludwig.

=== Death of Keishon Thomas ===
On February 26, 2022, 23-year-old Keishon Thomas died of a drug overdose at MPD's District 5 station.

The following year, two officers were charged in connection to Thomas's death . Officer Kreuger was reported to have failed to call for an ambulance, while Officer Lopez is reported to have failed to check Thomas in his cell & lied on his check logbook. Krueger would ultimately plead no contest to misconduct in office, for which he received only a 5,000 fine and no jail or probation time. Lopez, however, would plead to guilty this charge.

In February 2025, Thomas' family filed a lawsuit against the city of Milwaukee. On November 25, 2025, the Milwaukee Common Council would approval a $2.5 million settlement for Thomas' family. The settlement would then be legally approved on December 17, 2025, with the Thomas family accepting the settlement.

== Vehicles ==
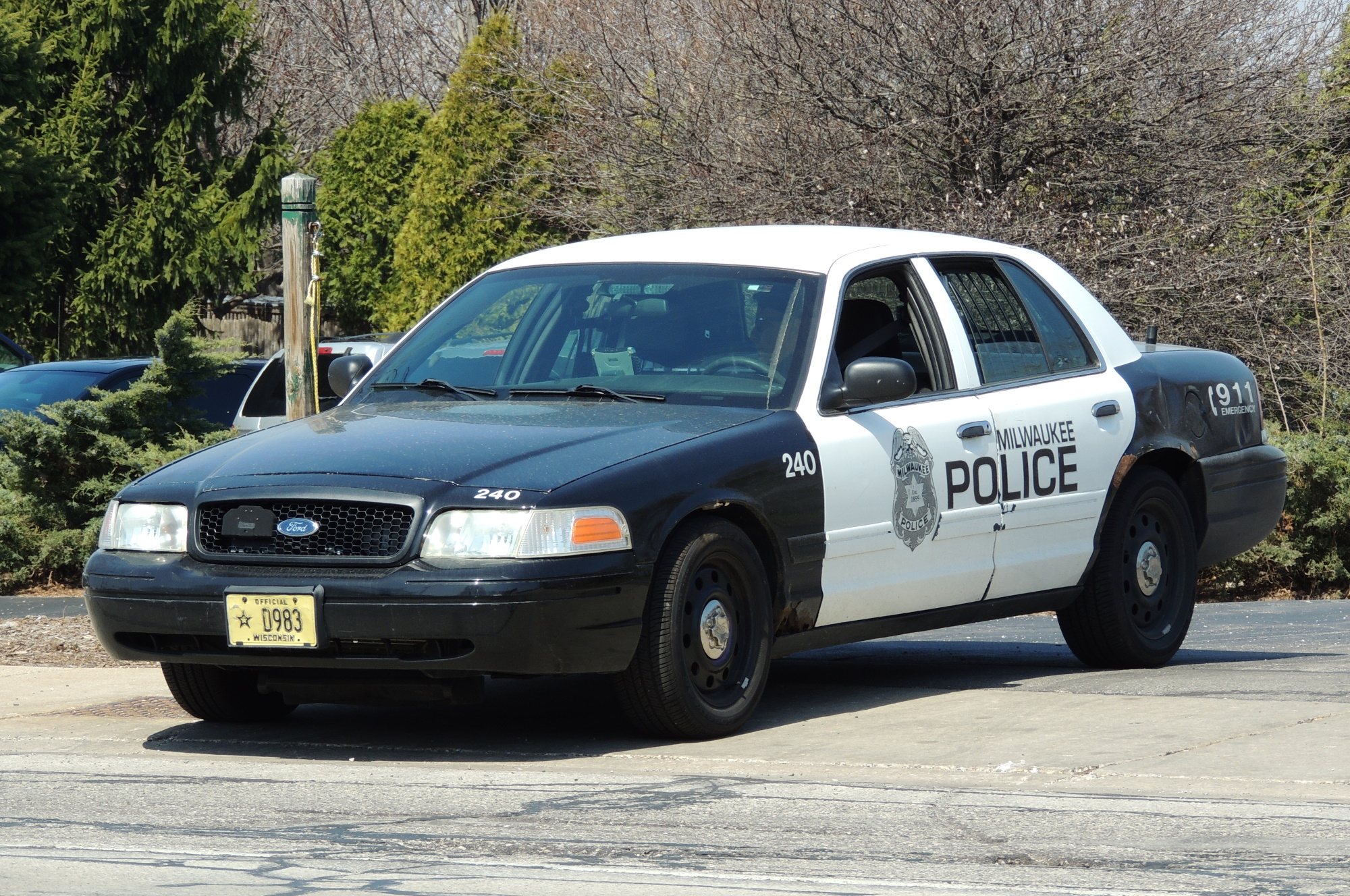
A Milwaukee Police Department Ford Crown Victoria Police Interceptor

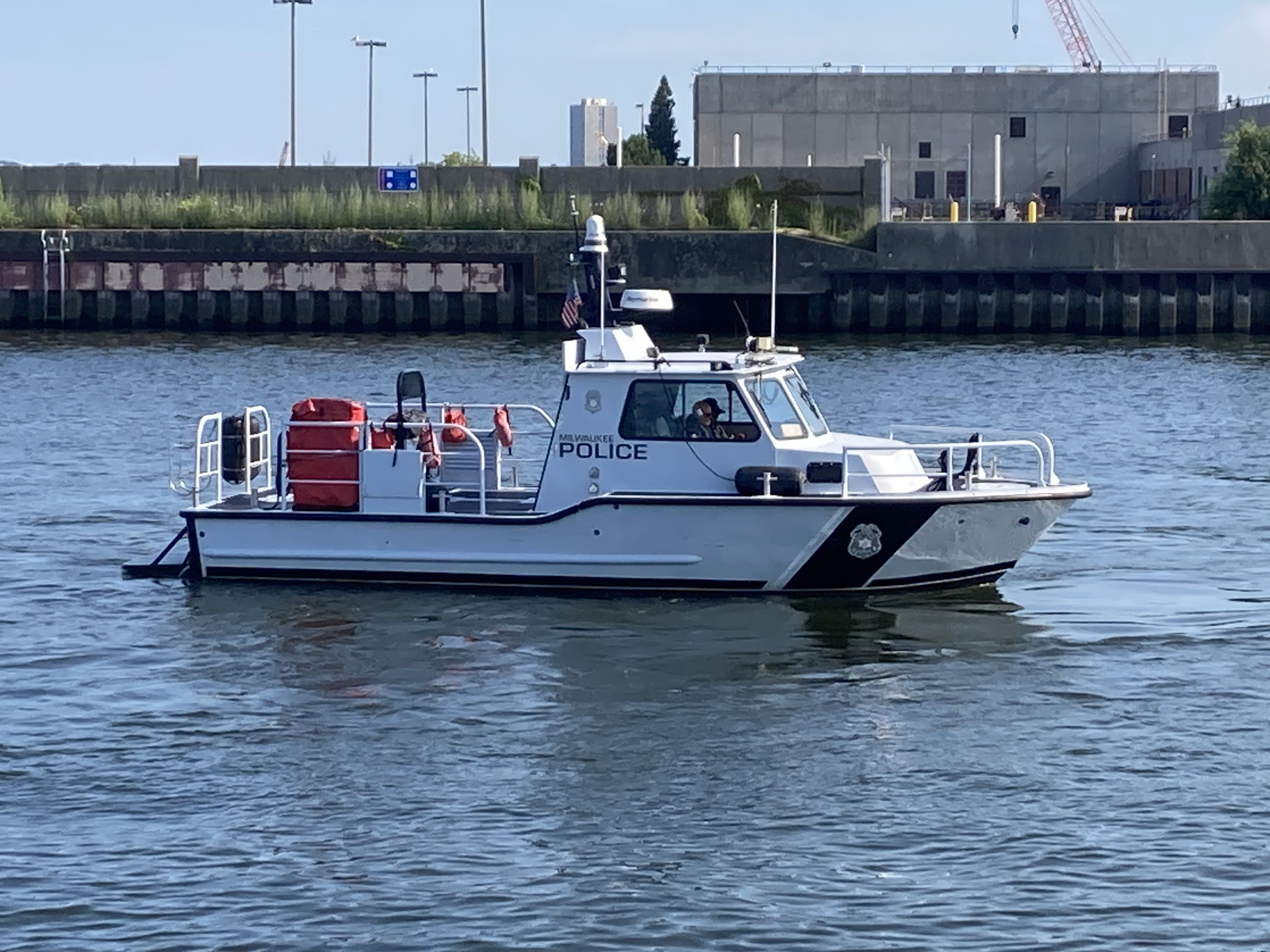
Milwaukee Police Department boat

The Milwaukee Police Department vehicle fleet consists of mixture of Ford Police Interceptor Utilities, Chevrolet Tahoe Police Pursuit Vehicles, Ford Crown Victoria Police Interceptors and Harley Davidson motorcycles for street patrols. The department also has a fleet of two boats and several support and specialized vehicles.

In 2019, CBS 58 found 379 of the 800 vehicles in the Milwaukee Police Department have more than 100,000 miles, five had over 200,000.

The current colors of MPD vehicles are black and white with "MILWAUKEE POLICE" and the department's badge emblazoned on both sides. In 2021, the department has introduced all black colored squads as they transition to the solid color moving forward.

== Weapons ==
In 2023, MPD transitioned back to Glock (G45 9mm) pistols due to accidental discharges of their P320 pistols while holstered.

In 2019, the MPD transitioned to the SIG Sauer P320 in 9mm following issues which involved frames cracking on the M&P40 pistols used by MPD. The holster chosen for the P320 pistols is made by Safariland, a company known for making various holsters and accessories.

As of 2018, Milwaukee police officers are armed with the Smith & Wesson M&P .40 S&W, which is the standard issue weapon for the department. It replaced the Glock 22 .40 caliber pistol following issues with the Glock's performance back in 2009.

As of 2009, the standard-issue patrol rifle is the Smith & Wesson M&P15; it was first purchased when the agency went to the M&P .40 sidearm.

== Rank structure ==
The following ranks and insignia are used by uniformed officers:

Title	Insignia	Ref
Chief of Police		
Assistant Chief		
Inspector		
Deputy Inspector		
Captain		
Lieutenant		
Sergeant		
Police Officer	No Insignia	

== Fallen officers ==
Since the establishment of the Milwaukee Police Department in 1855, 67 officers have died while on duty. The most recent officer related death occurred on December 6, 2023, as an officer was killed in an off-duty motor vehicle accident. One most recent known on-duty death was on June 26, 2025, where Tremaine Jones engaged in an ambush shooting which killed officer Kendall Corder and wounded Corder's partner officer Christopher McGray.

Cause of death	Number of deaths
Assault	1
Automobile accident	2
Bomb	9
Electrocuted	1
Explosion	1
Fire	1
Gunfire	30
Gunfire (Accidental)	1
Heart attack	2
Motorcycle accident	5
Struck by streetcar	1
Struck by train	1
Struck by vehicle	6
Vehicle pursuit	5

== See also ==
- Milwaukee Police Band
- 1981 Milwaukee Police Strike
- List of law enforcement agencies in Wisconsin
