= Wisconsin's 47th Assembly district =

American legislative district in Dane County, Wisconsin

Wisconsin's 47th State Assembly district
- 2024 map defined in 2023 Wisc. Act 94; 2022 map defined in Johnson v. Wisconsin Elections Commission; 2011 map was defined in 2011 Wisc. Act 43
Assemblymember
Randy Udell; D–Fitchburg
since January 6, 2025 (1 years)
- Demographics: 80.37% White; 6.34% Black; 7.94% Hispanic; 3.74% Asian; 1.53% Native American; 0.11% Hawaiian/Pacific Islander
- Population (2020) • Voting age: 58,987; 46,671
- Website: Official website
- Notes: Madison metro area (southeast)

The 47th Assembly district of Wisconsin is one of 99 districts in the Wisconsin State Assembly. Located in southern Wisconsin, the district comprises southeastern suburban and exurban areas of Madison within southern Dane County, including the cities of Fitchburg (except the northeastern portion) and Stoughton, and part of the village of McFarland. The district also contains Lake Kegonsa State Park. The seat is represented by Democrat Randy Udell since January 2025.

Prior to the Wisconsin Supreme Court overturning the 2022 district boundaries, District 47 was often used as one of the more extreme examples of Gerrymandering in the Wisconsin Legislature with the boundaries being compared to "swiss cheese".

The 47th Assembly district is located within Wisconsin's 16th Senate district, along with the 46th and 48th Assembly districts.

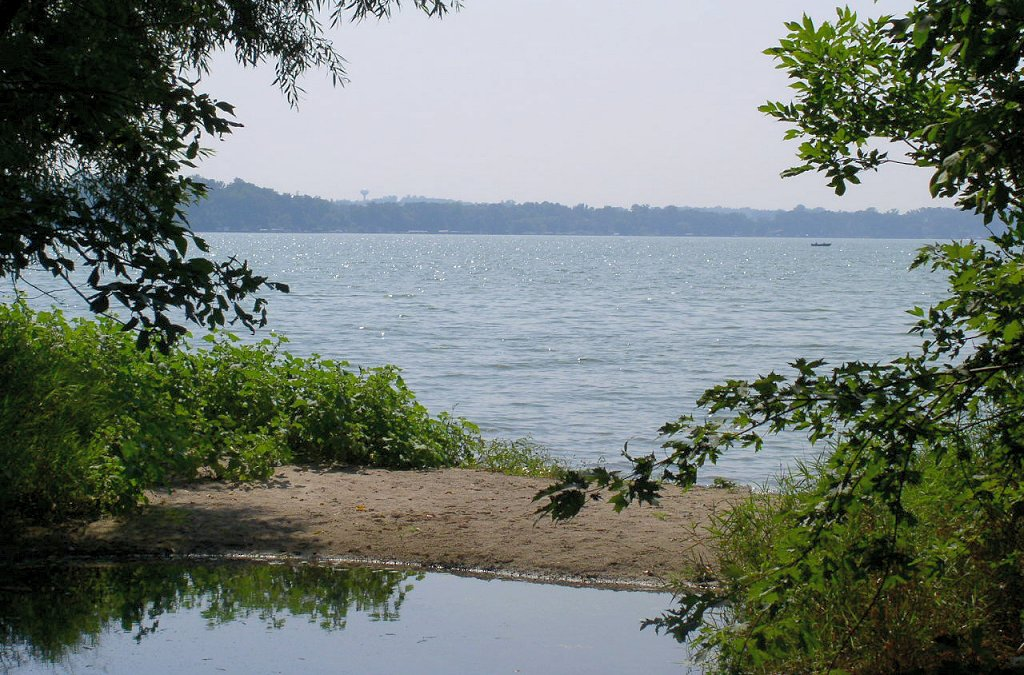
Lake Kegonsa State Park

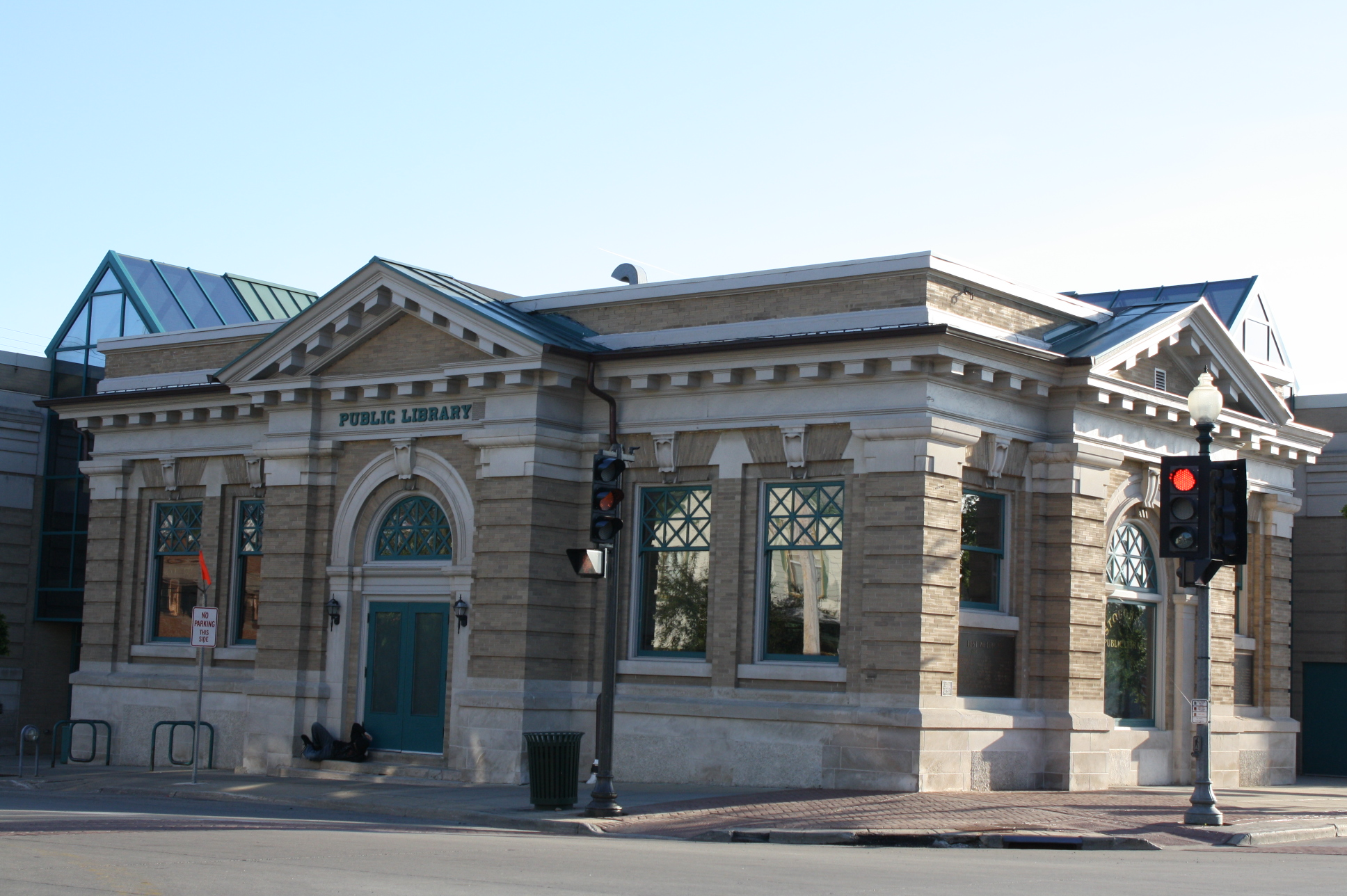
Stoughton public library

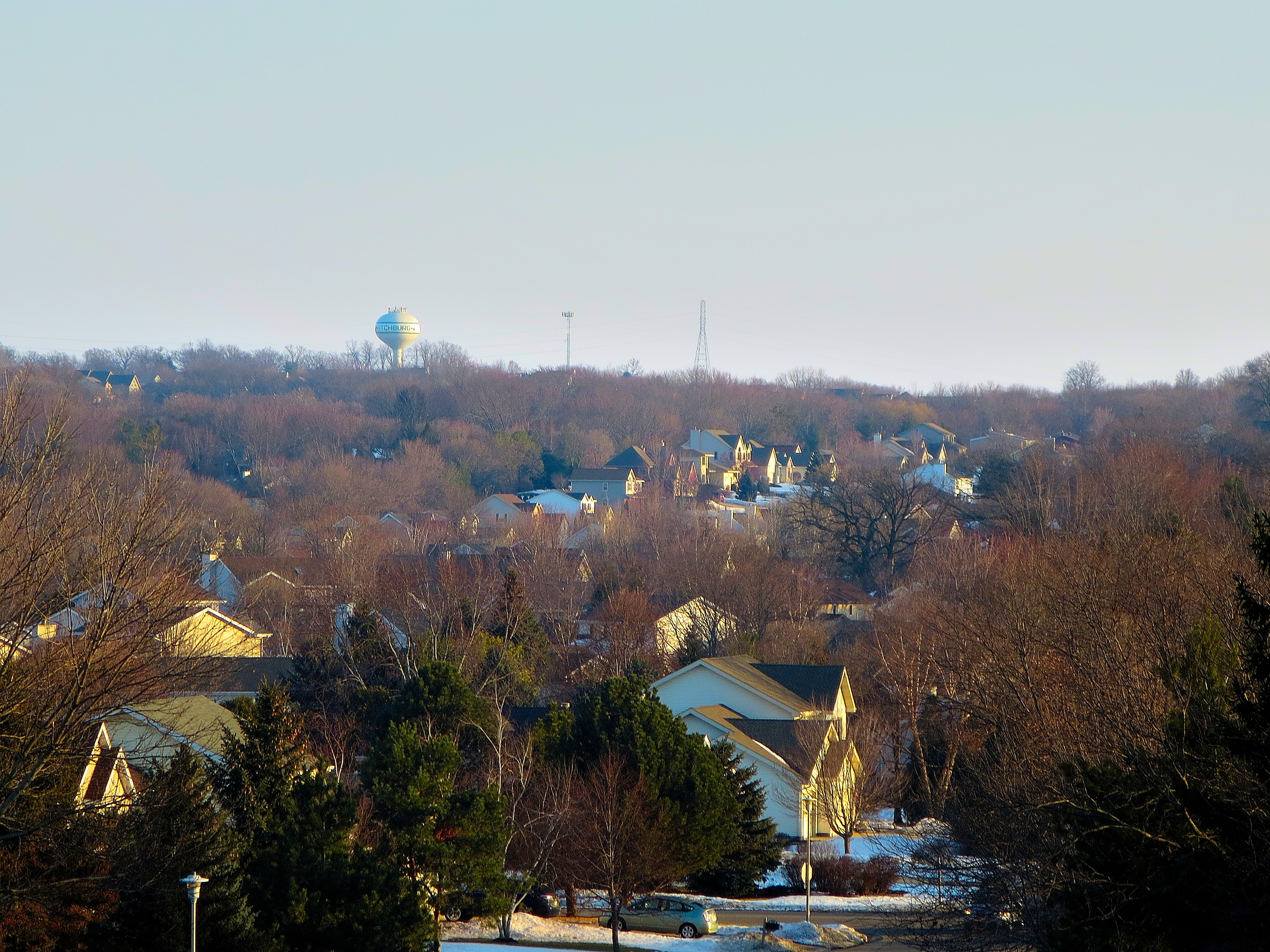
Neighborhood in Fitchburg.

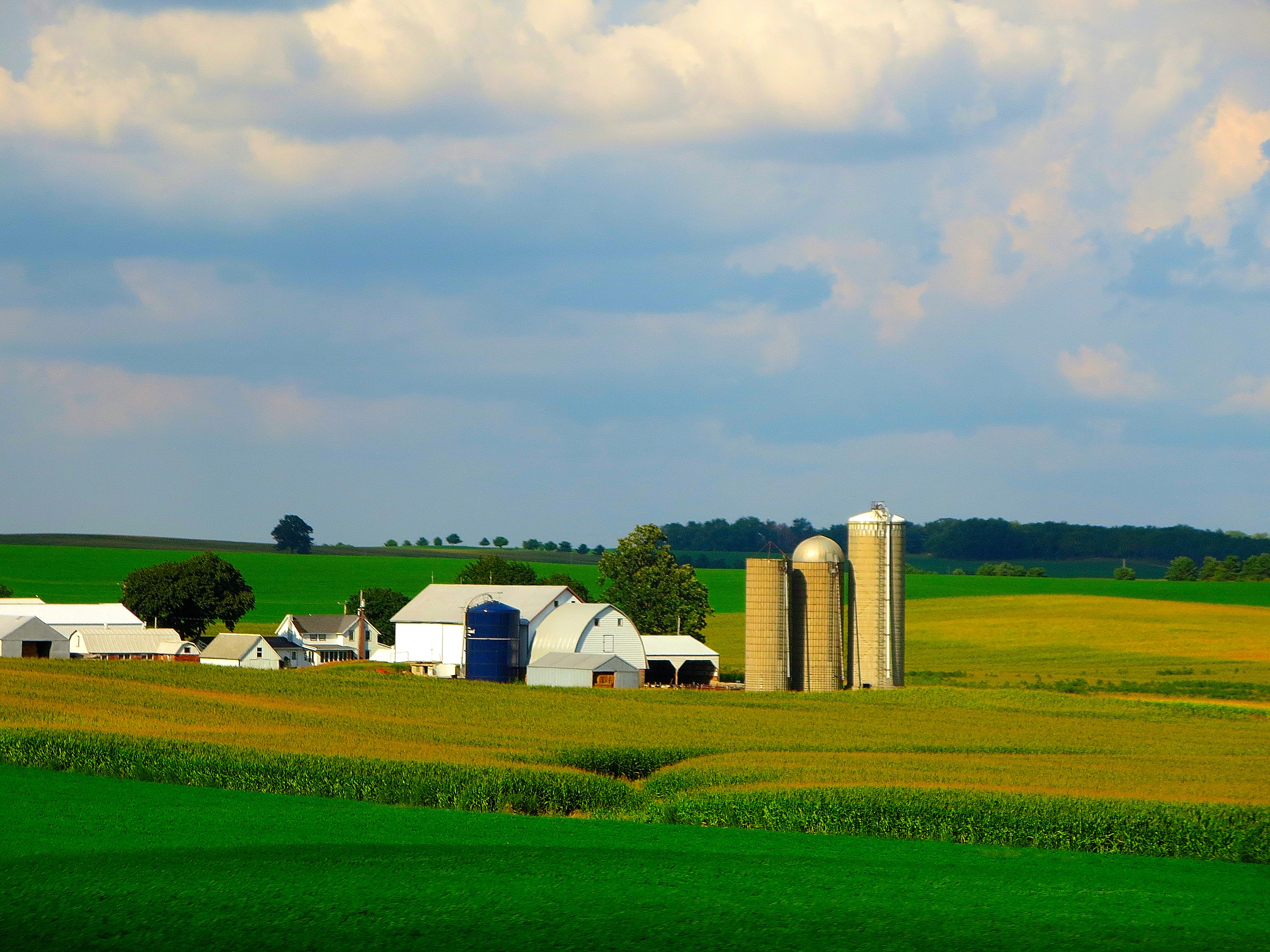
Fitchburg farm

== History ==
The district was created in the 1972 redistricting act (1971 Wisc. Act 304) which first established the numbered district system, replacing the previous system which allocated districts to specific counties. The 47th district was drawn with novel boundaries, taking part of the former Dane County 5th district and part of the Rock County 2nd district. The last representative of the Rock County 2nd district, Janet Soergel Mielke, won the 1972 election to become the 1st representative of the 47th Assembly district.

The boundaries of the 47th district have changed significantly in almost every one of the redistrictings since 1982. The court-ordered 1982 redistricting placed the district in northern Wisconsin. The 1983 legislative redistricting, which superseded the court-ordered plan, brought the district back to southern Wisconsin, covering most of Green County, sprawling through western and northern Rock County into southwest Jefferson County. The 1992 and 2002 maps had the district based in Columbia County and parts of northern Dane County. The 2011 plan moved the district into central Dane County.

Under the 2011 and 2022 maps, the district had several non-contiguous territorial islands, due to the inclusion of the now defunct towns of Madison and Blooming Grove. At the time, the towns had been mostly but not entirely annexed into the city of Madison, leaving a number of small territorial islands. The inclusion of these towns without the wards of the city of Madison that connected those territories was part of the legal basis for the 2023 lawsuit which ultimately resulted in the legislative map being ruled unconstitutional. The 2024 redistricting shifted the district to comprise much of Madison's southeast suburbs.

== List of past representatives ==
List of representatives to the Wisconsin State Assembly from the 47th district
Member	Party	Residence	Counties represented	Term start	Term end	Ref.
District created
Janet Soergel Mielke	Dem.	Milton	Dane, Rock	January 1, 1973	January 6, 1975	
Lyman F. Anderson	Rep.	Oregon	Dane, Rock	January 6, 1975	January 3, 1977	
Jonathan B. Barry	Dem.	Mount Horeb	Dane, Rock	January 3, 1977	April 30, 1981	
--Vacant--			Dane, Rock	April 30, 1981	June 25, 1982	
John T. Manske	Rep.	Milton	Dane, Rock	June 25, 1982	January 3, 1983	
Robert J. Larson	Rep.	Medford	Barron, Price, Rusk, Taylor	January 3, 1983	January 7, 1985	
John T. Manske	Rep.	Milton	Green, Jefferson, Rock	January 7, 1985	January 5, 1987	
David G. Deininger	Rep.	Monroe	Green, Jefferson, Rock	January 5, 1987	January 4, 1993	
Eugene Hahn	Rep.	Cambria	Columbia, Dane	January 4, 1993	January 5, 2009	
Eugene Hahn	Rep.	Cambria	Columbia, Dane, Sauk	January 4, 1993	January 5, 2009	
Keith Ripp	Rep.	Lodi	Columbia, Dane, Sauk	January 5, 2009	January 7, 2013	
Robb Kahl	Dem.	Monona	Dane	January 7, 2013	January 2, 2017	
Jimmy P. Anderson	Dem.	Fitchburg	Dane	January 3, 2017	January 6, 2025	
Randy Udell	Dem.	Fitchburg	Dane	January 6, 2025	Current	
