= Wisconsin's 76th Assembly district =

American legislative district for Madison, Wisconsin

Wisconsin's 76th State Assembly district
- 2024 map defined in 2023 Wisc. Act 94; 2022 map defined in Johnson v. Wisconsin Elections Commission; 2011 map was defined in 2011 Wisc. Act 43
Assemblymember
Francesca Hong; D–Madison
since January 4, 2021 (5 years)
- Demographics: 76.94% White; 8.91% Black; 6.32% Hispanic; 5.8% Asian; 1.75% Native American; 0.13% Hawaiian/Pacific Islander
- Population (2020) • Voting age: 59,142; 51,193
- Website: Official website
- Notes: Madison Isthmus

The 76th Assembly district of Wisconsin is one of 99 districts in the Wisconsin State Assembly. Located in south-central Wisconsin, the district is contained entirely within central Dane County. It includes the village of Maple Bluff and downtown and east side areas of the city of Madison, including most of the Madison Isthmus. The district contains landmarks such as the Wisconsin State Capitol, Wisconsin Governor's Mansion, Monona Terrace, Warner Park, Lake View Sanatorium, and part of the campus of Madison Area Technical College. The district is represented by Democrat Francesca Hong, since January 2021.

The 76th Assembly district is located within Wisconsin's 26th Senate district, along with the 77th and 78th Assembly districts.

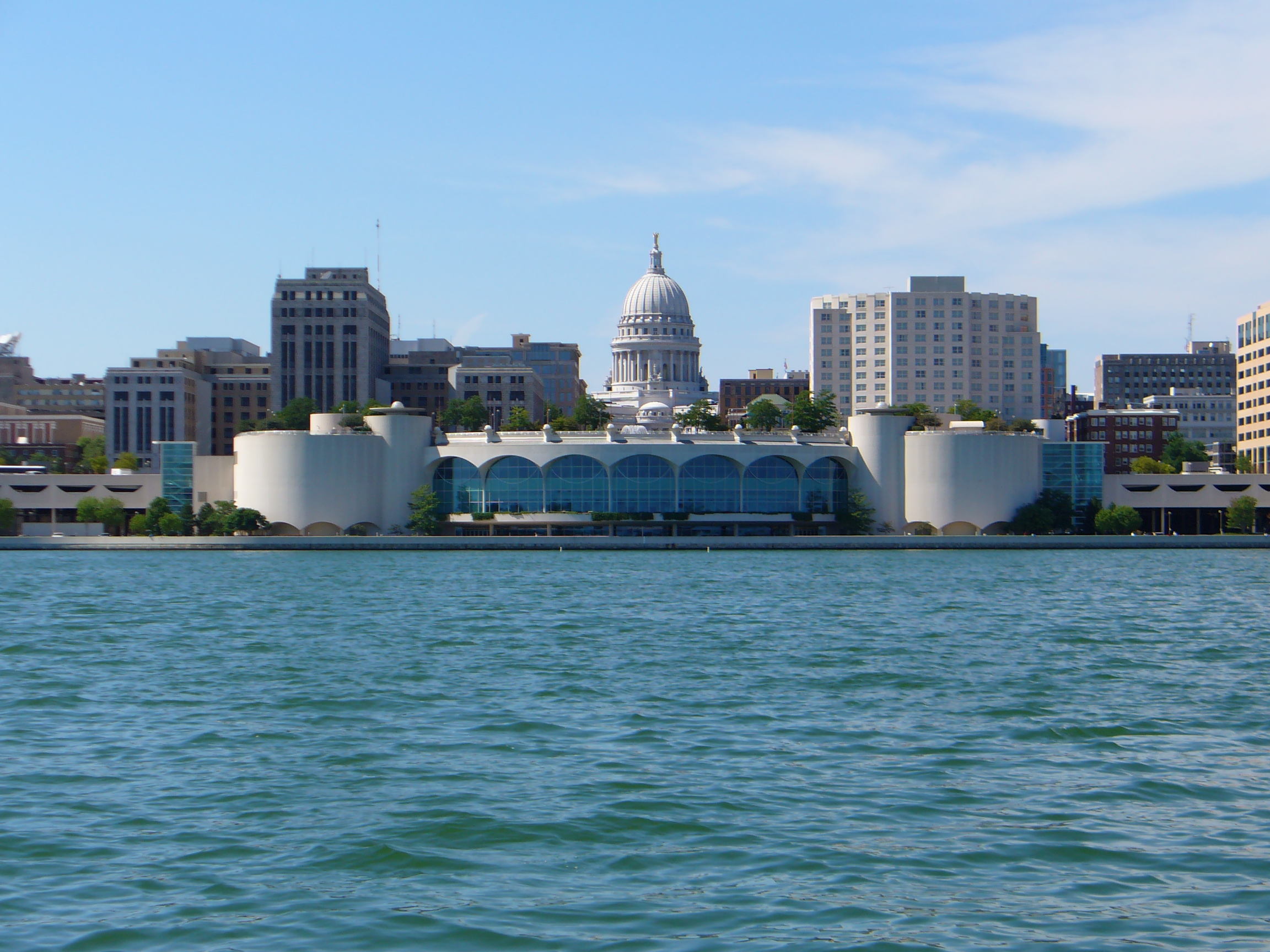
Wisconsin State Capitol viewed over Monona Terrace from Lake Monona

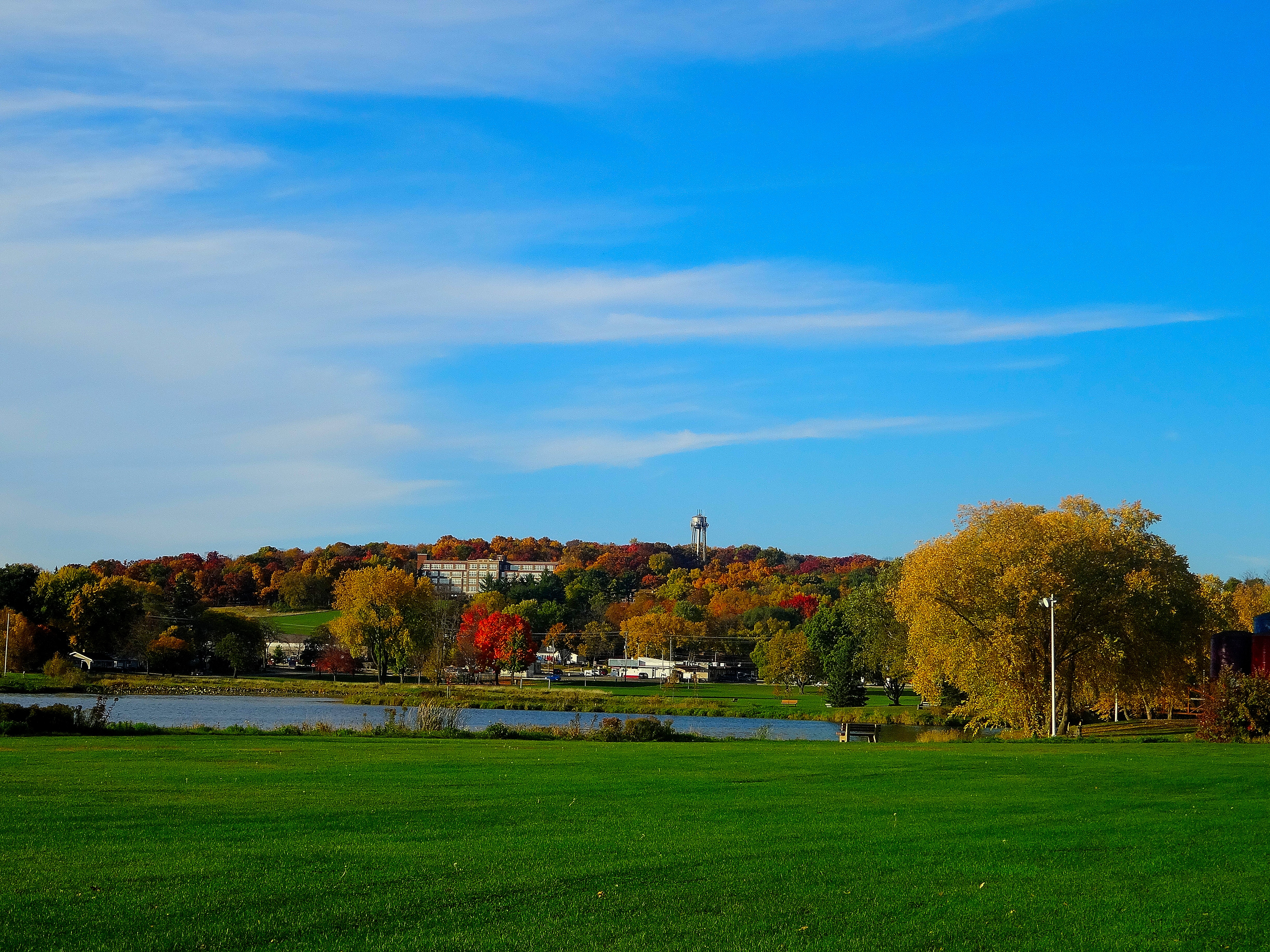
Warner Park

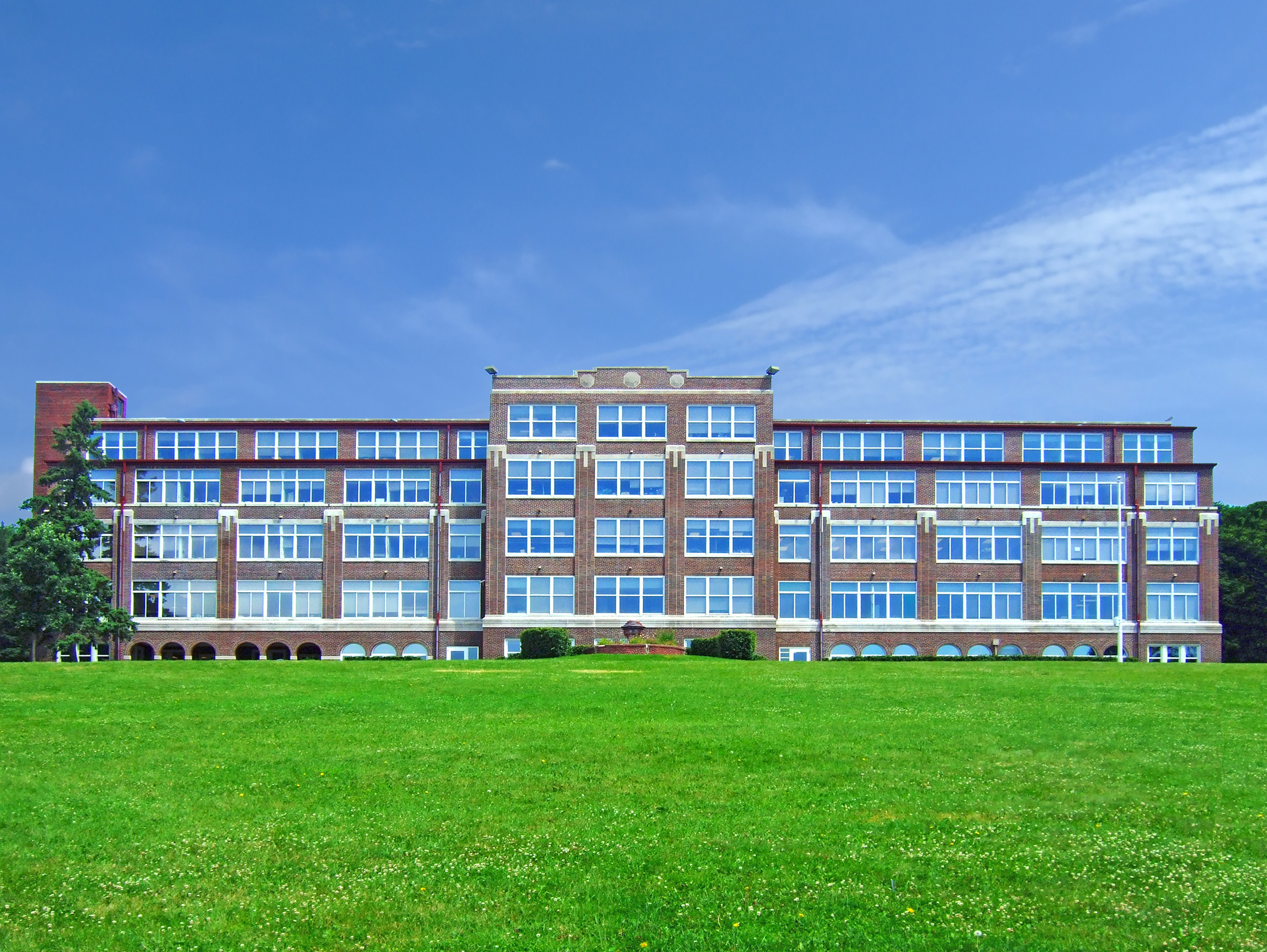
Lake View Sanatorium

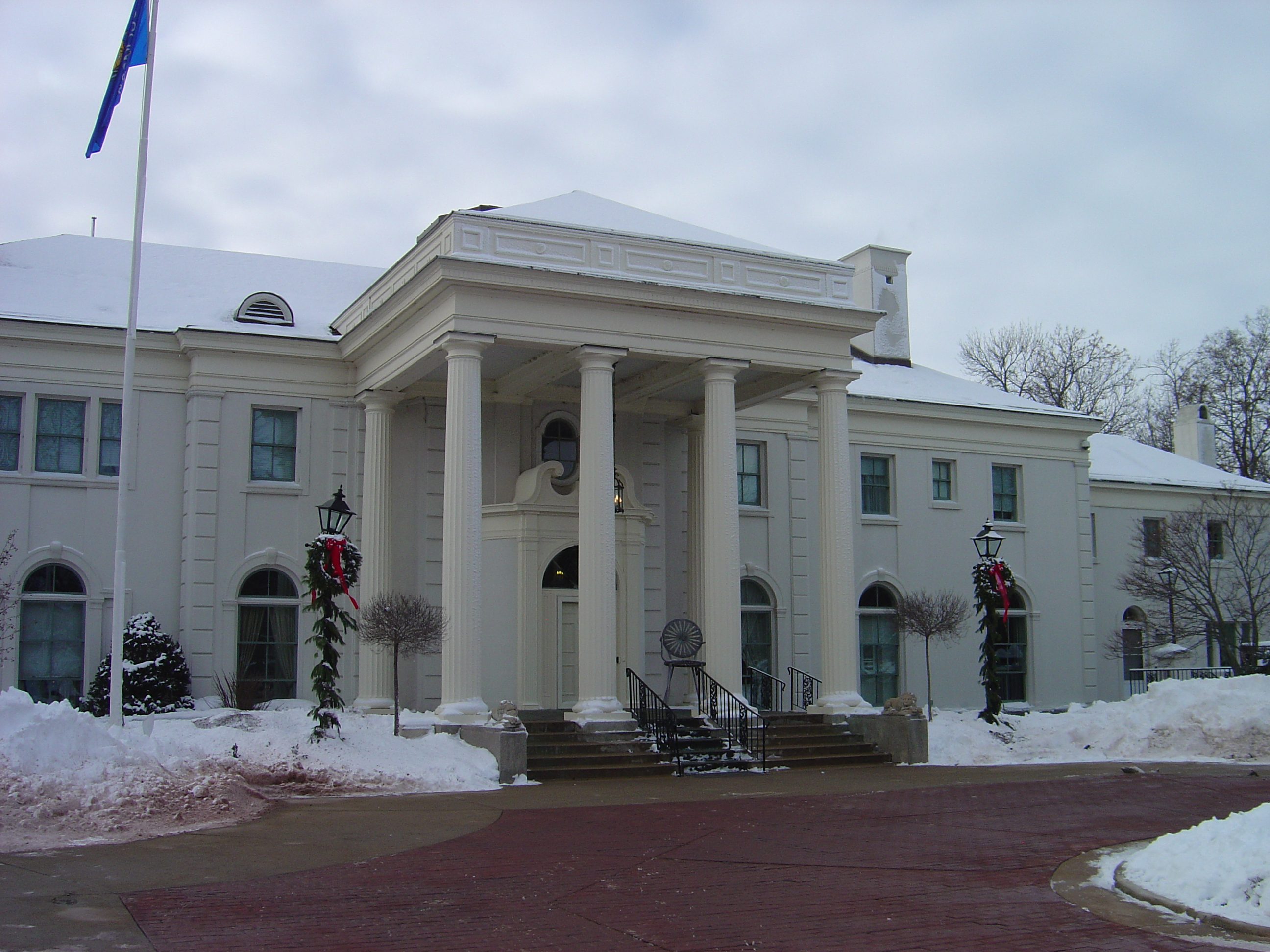
Wisconsin Governor's Mansion

== List of past representatives ==
List of representatives to the Wisconsin State Assembly from the 76th district
Member	Party	Residence	Counties represented	Term start	Term end	Ref.
District created
Mary Lou Munts	Dem.	Madison	Dane	January 1, 1973	January 3, 1983	
Vernon W. Holschbach	Dem.	Manitowoc	Manitowoc, Sheboygan	January 3, 1983	January 7, 1985	
Rebecca Young	Dem.	Madison	Dane	January 7, 1985	January 4, 1999	
Terese Berceau	Dem.	Madison	Dane	January 4, 1999	January 3, 2013	
Chris Taylor	Dem.	Madison	Dane	January 3, 2013	July 31, 2020	
--Vacant--			Dane	July 31, 2020	January 4, 2021	
Francesca Hong	Dem.	Madison	Dane	January 4, 2021	Current	
Dina Nina Martinez-Rutherford	Dem.	Madison	Dane	Taking office January 2027		
