= Patterson High School =

Patterson High School is the name of several educational institutions:

- Paterson Catholic High School in New Jersey
- Patterson High School (California)
- Patterson High School (Louisiana)
- Patterson Mill Middle and High School in Bel Air, Maryland
- Patterson High School (Maryland) in Baltimore, Maryland
