= Terese Berceau =

American politician

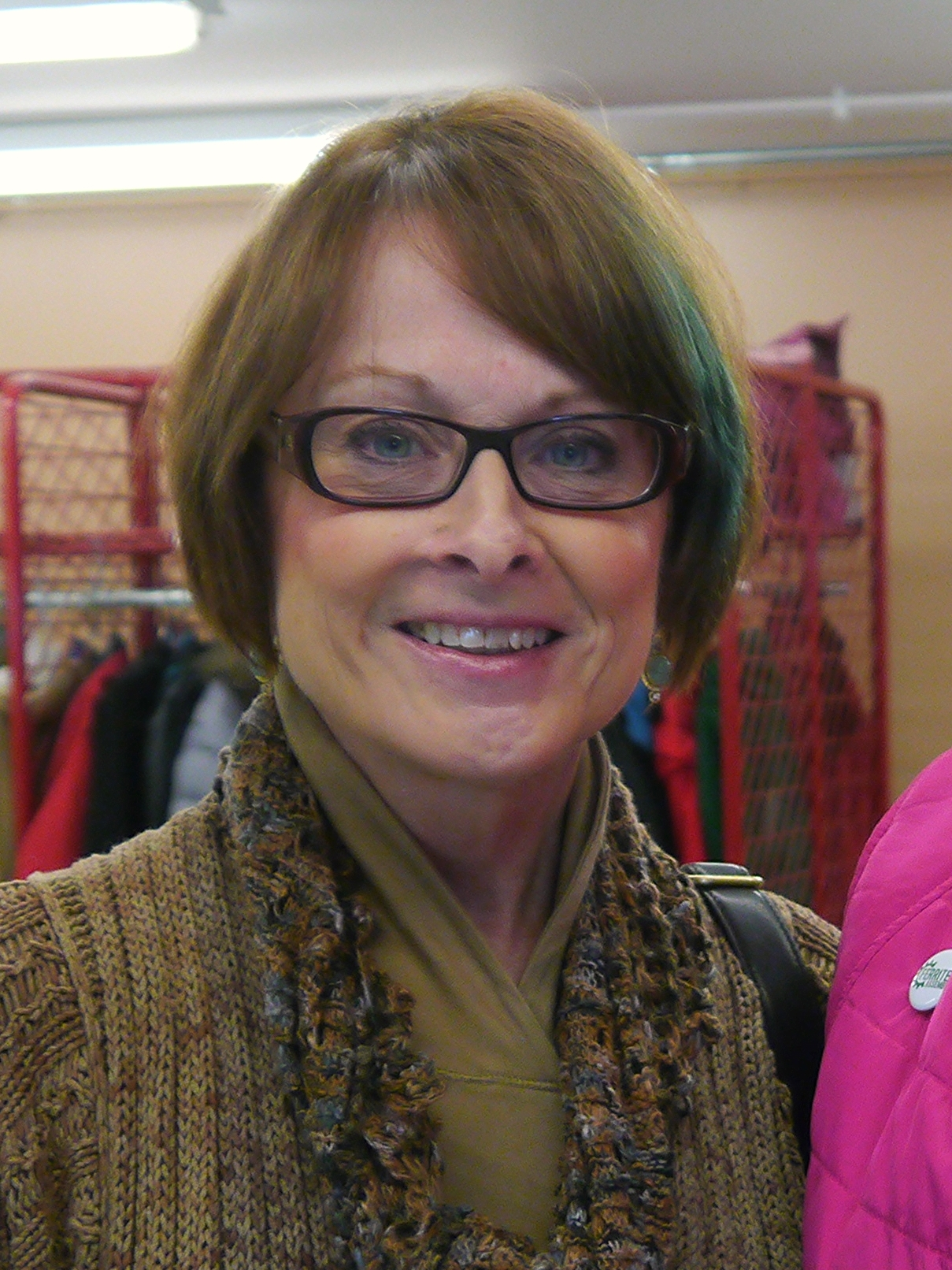
- Berceau in 2014

Member of the Wisconsin State Assembly
- In office January 3, 2013 – January 6, 2019
- Preceded by: Brett Hulsey
- Succeeded by: Shelia Stubbs
- Constituency: 77th district
- In office January 4, 1999 – January 3, 2013
- Preceded by: Rebecca Young
- Succeeded by: Chris Taylor
- Constituency: 76th district

Personal details
- Born: August 23, 1950 (age 76) Green Bay, Wisconsin
- Party: Democratic
- Spouse: Stuart Levitan
- Education: University of Wisconsin-Madison
- Profession: Educator

Terese L. Berceau (born August 23, 1950) is an American politician who served as a Democratic member of the Wisconsin State Assembly from 1999 until 2019.

Berceau was born in Green Bay, Wisconsin and graduated from the Green Bay East High School. She attended the University of Wisconsin-Madison, where she received a Bachelor of Science degree in 1973. She has been a resident of Madison, Wisconsin since 1969.

Prior to being elected to the State Assembly, Berceau served four terms on the Dane County Board of Supervisors from 1992 to 2000, representing the 20th Supervisory District on Madison's west side. She was Vice Chair of the Board from 1996 to 1998.

She also served on the City of Madison Community Development Authority from 1983 to 1992 and was a board member on the Greater Madison Convention and Visitors Bureau and the Monona Terrace Community and Convention Center.

Berceau was elected to represent the 76th Assembly district of Wisconsin in November 1998 after former State Representative Rebecca Young retired. The district number changed when Assembly districts were redrawn in 2011. The 77th District stretches from nearly Middleton in the north to Monona in the southeast and includes the area of Madison around the University of Wisconsin campus and the Village of Shorewood Hills. In the 1998 election, Berceau won with 71% of the total 22,603 votes cast, having a majority in all 26 wards. She was re-elected with 68% of the votes case in 2000. In 2002, 2004 and 2006 Berceau ran unopposed.

For the 2017–2018 legislative session, Berceau was the ranking Democrat on the Assembly Committees on Colleges and Universities and Consumer Protection and is a member of the Assembly Committees on Insurance, Local Government, Constitution and Ethics and the Joint Committee on Audit. In the 2005-06 session, Berceau introduced twenty-five bills related to reproductive rights, consumer protection, workers' rights, health care reform, the protection of stem cell research and the teaching of evolution.

In February 2018, Berceau announced her retirement from the legislature. In interviews following her announcement, she expressed a need to enter a new stage in her life.
