= Wisconsin's 78th Assembly district =

American legislative district for Madison, Wisconsin

Wisconsin's 78th State Assembly district
- 2024 map defined in 2023 Wisc. Act 94; 2022 map defined in Johnson v. Wisconsin Elections Commission; 2011 map was defined in 2011 Wisc. Act 43
Assemblymember
Shelia Stubbs; D–Madison
since January 6, 2025 (1 years)
- Demographics: 73.53% White; 9.32% Black; 10.03% Hispanic; 5.04% Asian; 2.0% Native American; 0.22% Hawaiian/Pacific Islander
- Population (2020) • Voting age: 59,825; 47,368
- Website: Official website
- Notes: Madison, Wisconsin

The 78th Assembly district of Wisconsin is one of 99 districts in the Wisconsin State Assembly. Located in south-central Wisconsin, the district is entirely contained within central Dane County. It includes most of the south and roughly half of the east side of the city of Madison, along with the city of Monona, most of the village of McFarland, and a small portion of the city of Fitchburg. The district contains the Capital Springs State Recreation Area and the Alliant Energy Center. The district is represented by Democrat Shelia Stubbs, since January 2025; Stubbs previously represented the 77th district from 2019 to 2025.

The 78th Assembly district is located within Wisconsin's 26th Senate district, along with the 76th and 77th Assembly districts.

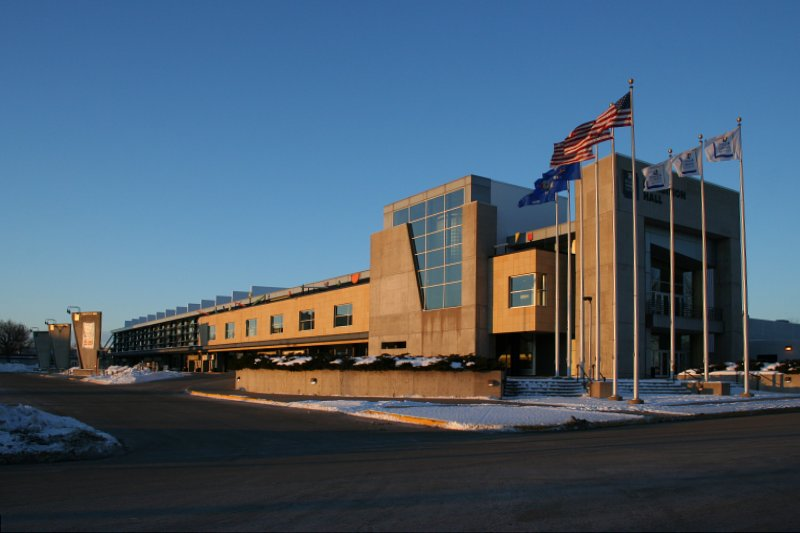
Exhibition Hall at the Alliant Energy Center

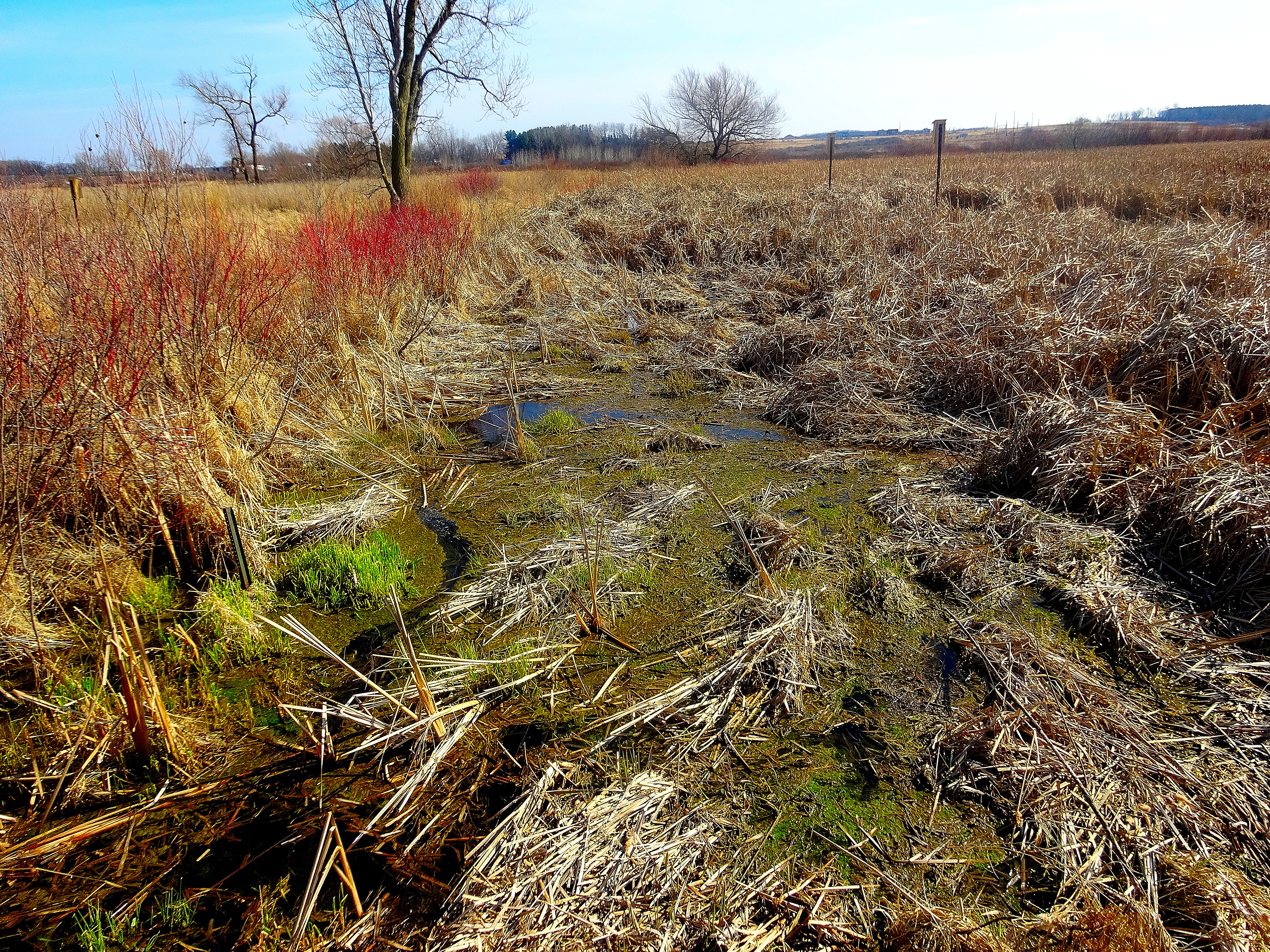
Capital Springs State Recreation Area

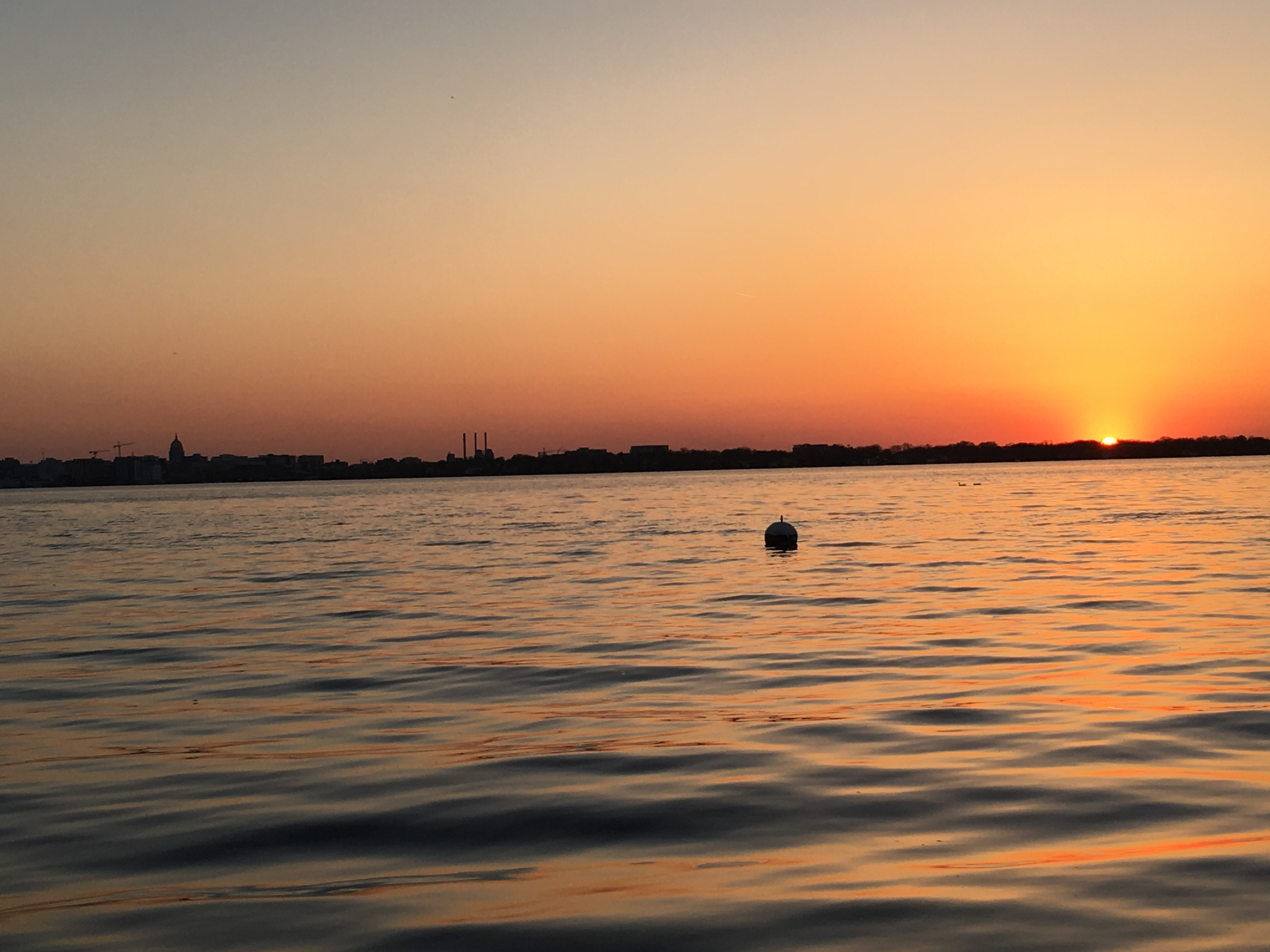
Sunset over Lake Monona

== History ==
Notable former representatives of this district include Tammy Baldwin, who was later elected to the United States House of Representatives and is now a United States Senator, and Mark Pocan, who is the current congressman for Wisconsin's 2nd congressional district.

== List of past representatives ==
List of representatives to the Wisconsin State Assembly from the 78th district
Member	Party	Residence	Counties represented	Term start	Term end	Ref.
District created
Edward Nager	Dem.	Madison	Dane	January 1, 1973	January 6, 1975	
David Clarenbach	Dem.	Madison	Dane	January 6, 1975	January 3, 1983	
Wilfrid J. Turba	Rep.	Elkhart Lake	Calumet, Fond du Lac, Sheboygan	January 3, 1983	January 7, 1985	
David Clarenbach	Dem.	Madison	Dane	January 7, 1985	January 4, 1993	
Tammy Baldwin	Dem.	Madison	Dane	January 4, 1993	January 3, 1999	
Mark Pocan	Dem.	Madison	Dane	January 3, 1999	January 3, 2013	
Brett Hulsey	Dem.	Madison	Dane	January 3, 2013	January 5, 2015	
Lisa Subeck	Dem.	Madison	Dane	January 5, 2015	January 6, 2025	
Shelia Stubbs	Dem.	Madison	Dane	January 6, 2025	Current	
