= Randy Udell =

21st century American politician

Treasurer of the Democratic Party of Wisconsin
- Incumbent
- Assumed office June 6, 2015
- Preceded by: Michael Childers

Member of the Wisconsin State Assembly from the 47th district
- Incumbent
- Assumed office January 6, 2025
- Preceded by: Jimmy Anderson

Member of the Board of Supervisors of Dane County, Wisconsin, from the 33rd district
- In office April 16, 2024 – April 21, 2026
- Preceded by: Dana Pellebon
- Succeeded by: Donald Dantzler Jr.

Personal details
- Born: May 30, 1961 (age 65) Beloit, Wisconsin, U.S.
- Spouse: Bradley Braaten
- Education: University of Wisconsin–Whitewater (BS)
- Occupation: Politician, legislator, telecommunications engineer
- Website: Official website Campaign website

Randy Alan Udell (born May 30, 1961) is an American telecommunications engineer and Democratic politician from Fitchburg, Wisconsin. He is a member of the Wisconsin State Assembly, representing Wisconsin's 47th Assembly district since 2025. He is also the current treasurer of the Democratic Party of Wisconsin, and previously represented the Fitchburg area as a member of the Dane County Board of Supervisors.

== Early life and career ==
Udell was born in Beloit, Wisconsin, on May 30, 1961. He attended Craig High School in Janesville, Wisconsin, graduating in 1979. Following this, he began attending the University of Wisconsin–Whitewater. While at UW–Whitewater, he was involved in student government, serving as a student senator, as well as in party politics, working for Democratic Representative Les Aspin and chairing the campus Young Democrats organization. Udell graduated from the university in 1983 with a bachelor's degree in political science.

After graduating from UW–Whitewater, Udell worked for Maryland Attorney General Stephen Sachs from 1984 to 1987. Shortly his work with the Maryland attorney general he briefly worked as a special agent with the Federal Bureau of Investigation, then began a thirty-years long career at AT&T as a finance agent and telecommunications engineer. In 1998, Udell returned to Wisconsin, settling down in Fitchburg, later serving as the chair and treasurer of the 2nd Congressional District Democratic Party of Wisconsin.

== Political career ==
In 2015, Udell was elected treasurer of the Wisconsin Democratic Party, being re-elected in 2017, 2019, 2021, 2023, and 2025.

Udell was first elected to the Fitchburg city council in 2020 to the 4th district, and was re-elected in 2022. In 2023 Udell ran for Fitchburg mayor, but was defeated by Julia Arata-Fratta by four points.

In December 2023 Udell announced a run for Dane County Board of Supervisors, and was subsequently elected to the 33rd district in the 2024 Spring election. He served for one two-year term and was succeeded by Fitchburg alder Donald D. Dantzler Jr.

Following Senator Melissa Agard's retirement, 47th district representative Jimmy Anderson announced a bid to replace her, leaving the district open. Shortly afterwards, Fitchburg alderman Joe Maldonado and Udell both announced bids to replace him. During the primary Udell campaigned on expanding broadband access to rural areas, while also emphasizing his experience in finance and budgeting as chair of the Fitchburg city council's finance committee and as Treasurer of the state Democratic Party.

In the primary election, Udell went on to defeat Maldonado by a slim 2 percent margin. As no Republican filed to run for the seat, Udell was unopposed for election and took office at the start of the 107th Wisconsin Legislature, on January 6, 2025.

After his inauguration, he joined the legislative LGBTQ+ caucus in February 2025. In July, Udell, alongside representative Clinton Anderson and state senator Tim Carpenter proposed a resolution calling on the federal government to release the Epstein Files.

== Personal life ==
Udell and his husband, Brad, live in Fitchburg with their rescue dog Cooper.

== Electoral history ==
=== Fitchburg City Council (2020, 2022) ===
Year	Election	Date	Elected				Defeated				Total	Plurality
2020	Primary	Feb. 18	Randy Udell	Nonpartisan	507	44.95%	Scott D. Lehmann	Non.	353	31.29%	1,128	154
2020	Primary	Feb. 18	Randy Udell	Nonpartisan	507	44.95%	Marc A. Jones	Non.	262	23.23%	1,128	154
2020	General	Apr. 7	Randy Udell	Nonpartisan	1,417	55.20%	Scott D. Lehmann	Non.	1,143	44.53%	2,567	274
2022	General	Apr. 5	Randy Udell (inc)	Nonpartisan	785	97.88%	--unopposed--				802	768

=== Fitchburg mayor (2023) ===
Year	Election	Date	Elected				Defeated				Total	Plurality
2023	General	Apr. 4	Julia Arata-Fratta	Nonpartisan	5,687	51.76%	Randy Udell	Non.	5,255	47.83%	10,986	432

=== Dane County Board of Supervisors (2024) ===
Year	Election	Date	Elected				Defeated	Total	Plurality
2024	General	Apr. 2	Randy Udell	Nonpartisan	2,937	98.82%	--unopposed--	2,972	2,902

=== Wisconsin State Assembly (2024) ===
Year	Election	Date	Elected				Defeated				Total	Plurality
2024	Primary	Aug. 13	Randy Udell	Democratic	6,699	50.95%	Joe Maldonado	Dem.	6,438	48.97%	13,148	261
2024	General	Nov. 5	Randy Udell	Democratic	29,040	98.18%	--unopposed--				29,579	28,501

Party political offices
Preceded by Michael Childers	Treasurer of the Democratic Party of Wisconsin; June 6, 2015 – present	Incumbent
Wisconsin State Assembly
Preceded by Jimmy Anderson	Member of the Wisconsin State Assembly from the 47th district January 6, 2025 – present	Incumbent
