= Fitchburg, Wisconsin =

- City
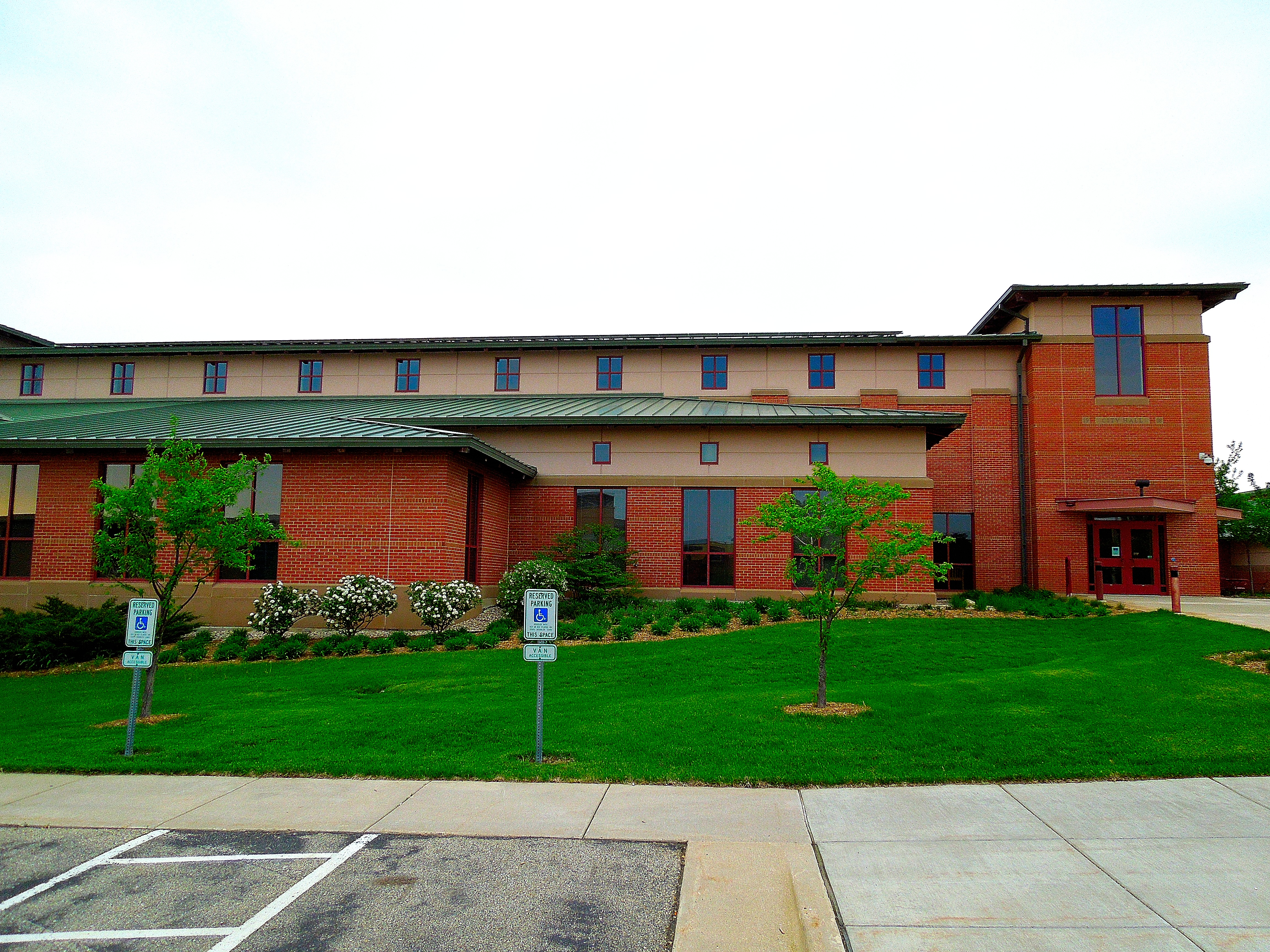
- Fitchburg City Hall
- Interactive map of Fitchburg, Wisconsin
- Location within Wisconsin Location within the United States
- Coordinates: 43°0′23″N 89°25′53″W
- Country: United States
- State: Wisconsin
- County: Dane
- Established: 1847
- Incorporated: April 26, 1983
- Named for: Fitchburg, Massachusetts

Government
  - Type: Mayor-council
  - Mayor: Julia Arata-Fratta
  - City Administrator: Chad Brecklin

Area
  - Total: 35.16 sq mi (91.06 km^{2})
  - Land: 34.92 sq mi (90.44 km^{2})
  - Water: 0.24 sq mi (0.62 km^{2})

Population (2020)
  - Total: 29,609
  - Density: 881.8/sq mi (340.46/km^{2})
- Time zone: UTC−6 (Central (CST))
  - Summer (DST): UTC−5 (CDT)
- Zipcode: 53711, 53719
- Area code: 608
- FIPS code: 55-25950
- Website: fitchburgwi.gov

Fitchburg is a city in Dane County, Wisconsin, United States. The population was 29,609 at the 2020 census. The Wisconsin Department of Administration estimates the population has grown to 37,220 as of January 1, 2026.

It is a suburb south of Madison and is part of the Madison metropolitan area. Fitchburg consists of a mix of suburban neighborhoods closer to the border with Madison, commercial and industrial properties, and rural properties in the south. The city is known for its blend of urban convenience and protected farmland, with parks, bike trails, and a growing business community.

== History ==
John Stoner began farming in what would become Fitchburg in 1837. Immigrant brothers William, George and Joseph Vroman from the Netherlands are claimed to be the first permanent settlers in 1839. Established as the Town of Greenfield in 1847, the name was changed to Fitchburg in 1853 to avoid confusion with Greenfield, Milwaukee County. The name Fitchburg was chosen by Ebenezer Brigham, after Fitchburg, Massachusetts. A significant number of Irish families settled in Fitchburg as well.

As the city of Madison began to encroach upon the town of Fitchburg via annexation, the town pursued incorporation as a city to halt Madison's expansion into the town. The fight to allow incorporation ultimately went to the Wisconsin Supreme Court, which ruled in favor of Fitchburg. Fitchburg then incorporated as a city on April 26, 1983.

On October 31, 2022, the remaining disconnected parts of the Town of Madison were absorbed into the cities of Madison and Fitchburg. The dissolution finalized a cooperative boundary plan agreed upon by the three municipalities in 2003 to end decades of annexation disputes and orderly transition services.

== Geography ==
According to the United States Census Bureau, the city has a total area of 35.21 square miles (91.19 km^{2}), of which 34.97 square miles (90.57 km^{2}) is land and 0.24 square miles (0.62 km^{2}) is water. Former unincorporated communities absorbed by Fitchburg include Fitchburg Center and Oak Hall.

=== Climate ===
Fitchburg

Climate chart (precipitation, max. and min. temperature)
J	F	M	A	M	J	J	A	S	O	N	D
93 −10 −12	93 −5 −11	73 5 −7	152 19 1	109 23 7	184 28 15	84 27 18	104 25 17	75 22 11	100 16 4	61 6 −1	72 −4 −12
- █ Average max. and min. temperatures in °C
- █ Precipitation totals in mm
Imperial conversion
J	F	M	A	M	J	J	A	S	O	N	D
3.7 14 10	3.7 23 12	2.9 41 19	6 66 34	4.3 73 45	7.2 82 59	3.3 81 64	4.1 77 63	3 72 52	3.9 61 39	2.4 43 30	2.8 25 10
- █ Average max. and min. temperatures in °F
- █ Precipitation totals in inches

== Demographics ==
Historical population
Census	Pop.	Note	%±
1990	15,648		—
2000	20,501		31.0%
2010	25,260		23.2%
2020	29,609		17.2%
2025 (est.)	36,197		22.2%
U.S. Decennial Census

=== 2020 census ===
As of the 2020 census, Fitchburg had a population of 29,609. The median age was 35.1 years. 21.0% of residents were under the age of 18 and 13.4% of residents were 65 years of age or older. For every 100 females there were 104.7 males, and for every 100 females age 18 and over there were 105.1 males age 18 and over.

90.7% of residents lived in urban areas, while 9.3% lived in rural areas.

There were 12,612 households in Fitchburg, of which 26.6% had children under the age of 18 living in them. Of all households, 42.1% were married-couple households, 21.2% were households with a male householder and no spouse or partner present, and 26.5% were households with a female householder and no spouse or partner present. About 32.0% of all households were made up of individuals and 7.4% had someone living alone who was 65 years of age or older.

There were 13,201 housing units, of which 4.5% were vacant. The homeowner vacancy rate was 1.4% and the rental vacancy rate was 4.6%.

Racial composition as of the 2020 census
Race	Number	Percent
White	19,349	65.3%
Black or African American	3,216	10.9%
American Indian and Alaska Native	227	0.8%
Asian	1,476	5.0%
Native Hawaiian and Other Pacific Islander	12	0.0%
Some other race	2,527	8.5%
Two or more races	2,802	9.5%
Hispanic or Latino (of any race)	4,935	16.7%

=== 2021 American Community Survey estimates ===
As of 2021, the median income for a household in the city was $78,218, and the median income for a family was $105,506. Among earners age 16 and up, males had a median income of $52,563 versus $43,133 for females. The per capita income for the city was $50,001. About 8.6% of families and 10.4% of the population were below the poverty line, including 15.8% of those under age 18 and 2.1% of those age 65 or over.

=== 2010 census ===
As of the census of 2010, there were 25,260 people, 9,955 households, and 6,238 families living in the city. The population density was 722.3 inhabitants per square mile (278.9/km^{2}). There were 10,668 housing units at an average density of 305.1 per square mile (117.8/km^{2}). The racial makeup of the city was 72.2% White, 10.4% African American, 0.4% Native American, 4.9% Asian, 8.8% from other races, and 3.2% from two or more races. Hispanic or Latino of any race were 17.2% of the population.

There were 9,955 households, of which 33.6% had children under the age of 18 living with them, 47.4% were married couples living together, 10.5% had a female householder with no husband present, 4.7% had a male householder with no wife present, and 37.3% were non-families. 27.3% of all households were made up of individuals, and 5.4% had someone living alone who was 65 years of age or older. The average household size was 2.45 and the average family size was 3.03.

The median age in the city was 32.9 years. 24.5% of residents were under the age of 18; 9.4% were between the ages of 18 and 24; 33.1% were from 25 to 44; 25.3% were from 45 to 64; and 7.6% were 65 years of age or older. The gender makeup of the city was 51.6% male and 48.4% female.

== Government ==
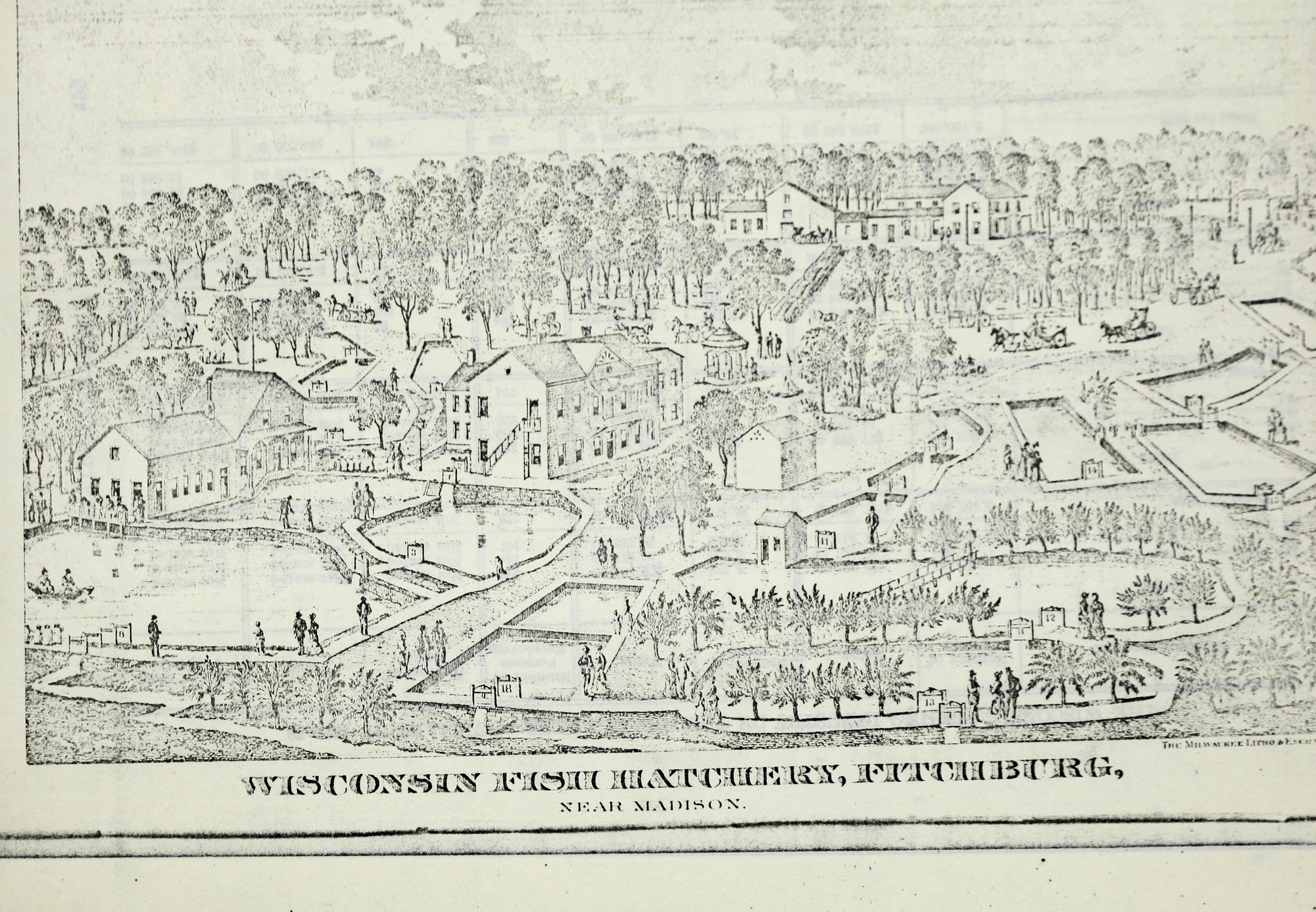
Nevin Springs Fish and Wildlife Area is still open today as a fish hatchery.

Julia Arata-Fratta is the mayor of Fitchburg, first elected to a three-year term in 2023. Fitchburg is represented by Mark Pocan (D) in the United States House of Representatives, and by Ron Johnson (R) and Tammy Baldwin (D) in the United States Senate. Melissa Ratcliff (D) and Kelda Roys (D) represent Fitchburg in the Wisconsin State Senate, and Randy Udell (D), Renuka Mayadev (D) and Shelia Stubbs (D) represent Fitchburg in the Wisconsin State Assembly.

Fitchburg is served by the Fitchburg Police Department and Fitchburg Fire Department. Emergency medical services are provided by the Fitch-Rona EMS district, which also serves the neighboring city and town of Verona. Various portions of Fitchburg are served by municipal sewer, water and natural gas utilities.

== Transportation ==
=== Major highways ===
- U.S. Highway 14
- U.S. Highway 18
- U.S. Highway 151

=== Railroads ===
Historically, Fitchburg was served by the Illinois Central Railroad and two lines of the Chicago and North Western railroad. Both the Illinois Central line and the westernmost of the two CNW lines have been replaced by rail trails that carry the Badger State Trail and Military Ridge State Trail respectively. The easternmost CNW line is operated by Wisconsin & Southern Railroad serves Fitchburg via the Reedsburg Subdivision which connects the city to Oregon to the south and Reedsburg to the north via Madison.

=== Public Transit ===
Fitchburg is served by Metro Transit. The B route serves the Hatchery Hill area with service to Downtown Madison towards North Madison. Route D2 serves the west side of the city with service to Downtown Madison and the Dane County Regional Airport. Route G serves the Southdale neighborhood with connections to the South Transfer Point and the East Side of Madison. Route 65 provides peak hour commuter service from Downtown Madison and the UW Campus to Terravessa and Fitchburg Center neighborhoods. Route 75 provides peak hour commuter service linking Fitchburg to the Capital Square to the east, Verona and the Epic campus to the west. Fitchburg will be served by the future Metro Bus Rapid Transit system along the "north-south" route, stations are planned for Greenway Crossing, Post Rd, Cahill Main and the south terminus at McKee Road, this service is expected to start by 2027.

=== Trails ===
The Badger State Trail, Ice Age Trail, Cannonball trail, and SouthWest commuter trail pass through the city, Fitchburg is linked to the Madison area's extensive bike path network.

== Notable people ==
- Jimmy P. Anderson, Wisconsin State Assembly, lives in Fitchburg
- Ada Deer, Native American advocate, scholar, former Assistant Secretary of the Interior, lived in Fitchburg
- Frances Huntley-Cooper, Former Mayor, lives in Fitchburg
- Elizabeth McCoy (microbiologist), Microbiologist and Professor, lived in Fitchburg
- Mahlon Mitchell, President of the Professional Firefighters of Wisconsin and 2018 Democratic candidate for Governor, lives in Fitchburg
- Roscoe Mitchell, Saxophonist and composer, lives in Fitchburg
- Homer A. Stone, Wisconsin State Assembly and farmer, was born in Fitchburg
- Randy Udell, Wisconsin state legislator, lives in Fitchburg.
