= Fitchburg Center, Fitchburg, Wisconsin =

Fitchburg Center, Wisconsin
- Former unincorporated community
- Location within Wisconsin Location within the United States
- Coordinates: 43°0′4.3″N 89°25′40.8″W
- Country: United States
- State: Wisconsin
- County: Dane County
- City: Fitchburg
- Time zone: UTC-6 (Central (CST))
  - Summer (DST): UTC-5 (CDT)
- Area code: 608

Fitchburg Center is a neighborhood in the city of Fitchburg, Dane County, Wisconsin, United States. It is located at the intersection of Lacy Road and Fish Hatchery Road (County Highway D). Once part of the Town of Fitchburg, it became part of the city of Fitchburg when it was incorporated in 1983. Fitchburg Center now forms the core of the city of Fitchburg.

== See also ==
- Oak Hall, Fitchburg, Wisconsin
