= Homer A. Stone =

American politician

Homer A. Stone (February 2, 1868 – August 30, 1938) was an American politician and farmer.

Born in the town of Fitchburg, Wisconsin, Stone graduated from Oregon High School in Oregon, Wisconsin and then took a short course in agriculture at University of Wisconsin. He was a farmer and was involved with a creamery, the fire insurance business, and the bank. Stone served on the school board and was the board clerk. In 1917, Stone served in the Wisconsin State Assembly and was a Republican. Stone died at his home in Fitchburg, Wisconsin after a long illness. He was buried at Prairie Mound Cemetery in Oregon, Wisconsin.
