= Wisconsin's 77th Assembly district =

American legislative district for Madison, Wisconsin

Wisconsin's 77th State Assembly district
- 2024 map defined in 2023 Wisc. Act 94; 2022 map defined in Johnson v. Wisconsin Elections Commission; 2011 map was defined in 2011 Wisc. Act 43
Assemblymember
Renuka Mayadev; D–Madison
since January 6, 2025 (1 years)
- Demographics: 71.13% White; 4.49% Black; 5.73% Hispanic; 17.05% Asian; 1.42% Native American; 0.14% Hawaiian/Pacific Islander
- Population (2020) • Voting age: 59,997; 53,015
- Website: Official website
- Notes: Madison, Wisconsin

The 77th Assembly district of Wisconsin is one of 99 districts in the Wisconsin State Assembly. Located in south-central Wisconsin, the district is contained entirely within central Dane County. It includes the village of Shorewood Hills, the western portion of downtown and the near west neighborhoods of the city of Madison. The district contains all of the University of Wisconsin–Madison campus and Edgewood College, as well as landmarks such as the Wisconsin Historical Society, the State Street pedestrian mall, Camp Randall Stadium, the Kohl Center, the University of Wisconsin–Madison Arboretum, Henry Vilas Zoo, UW Health University Hospital, and historic Forest Hill Cemetery. The district is represented by Democrat Renuka Mayadev, since January 2025. The 77th district has the largest Asian American population in the Assembly.

The 77th Assembly district is located within Wisconsin's 26th Senate district, along with the 76th and 78th Assembly districts.

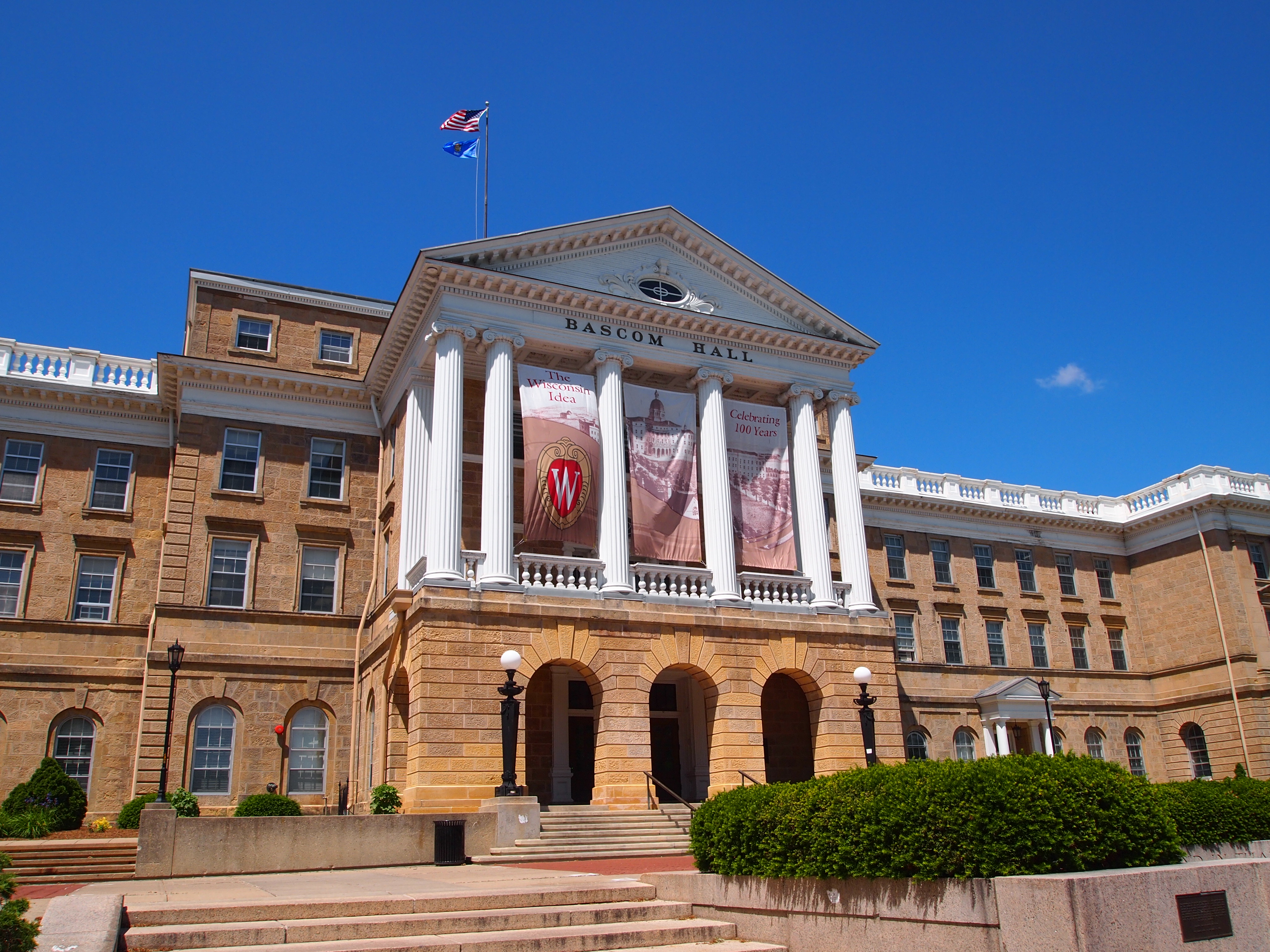
Bascom Hall on Bascom Hill, on the University of Wisconsin–Madison campus

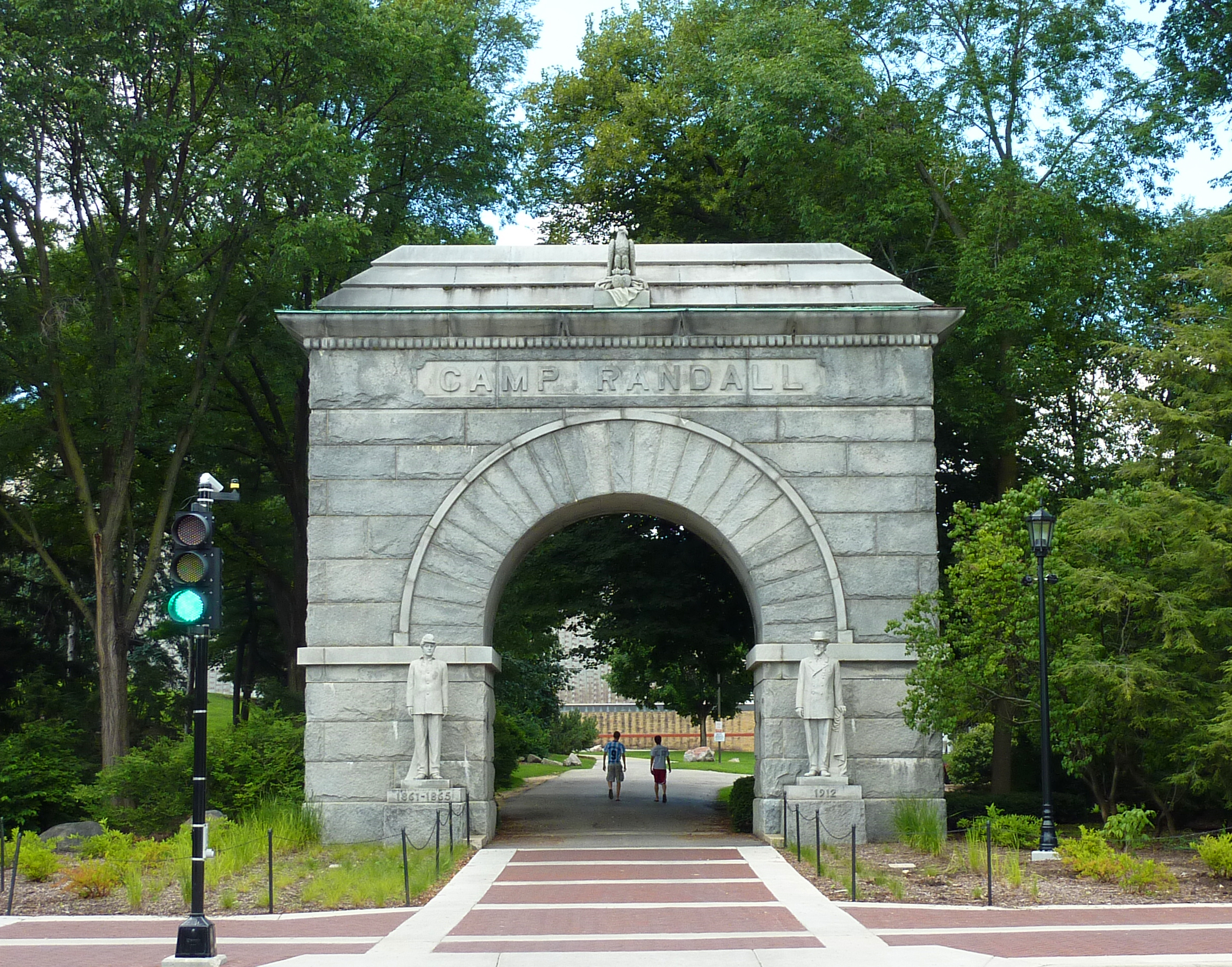
Camp Randall arch

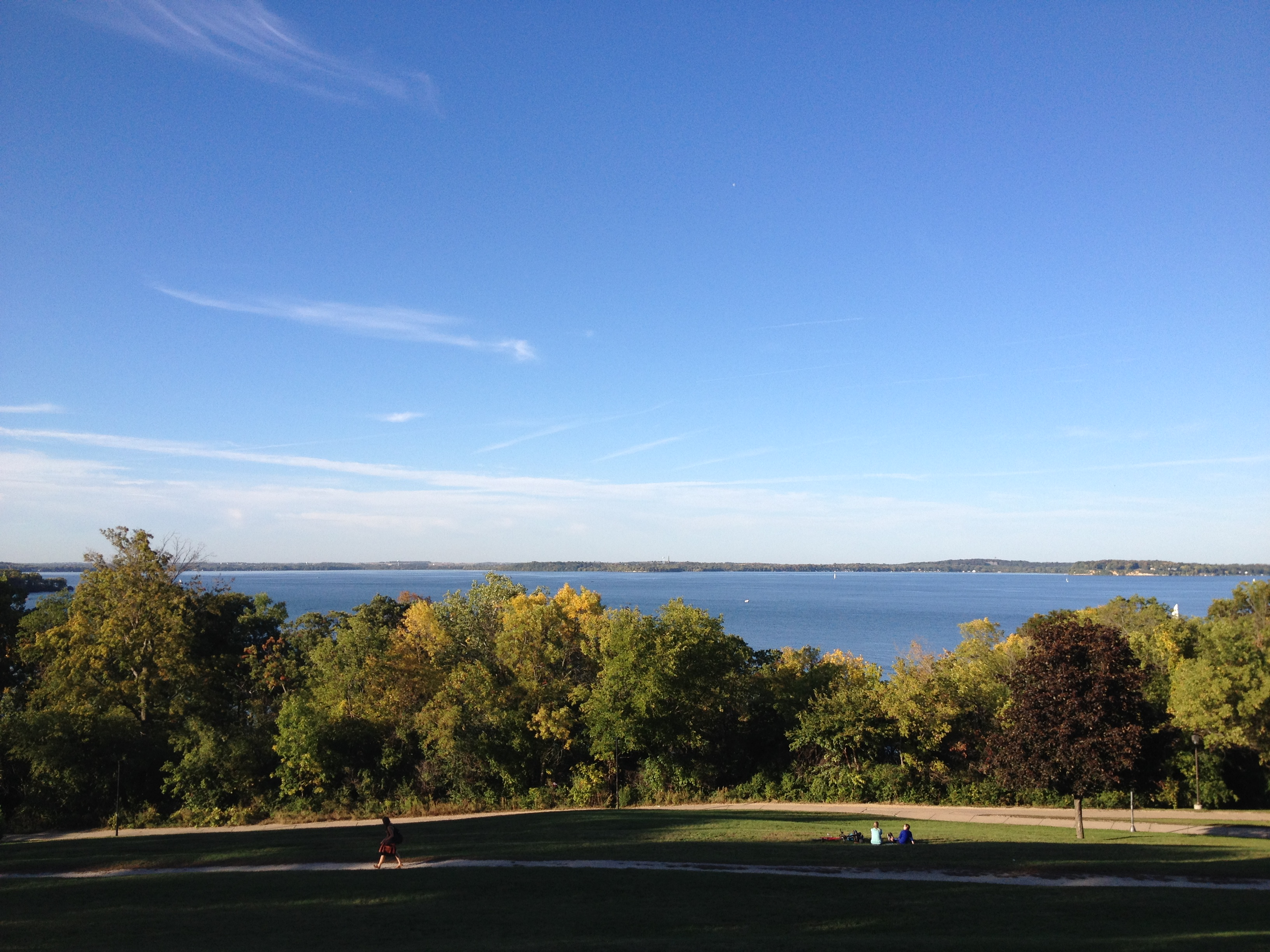
Lake Mendota viewed from Observatory Drive

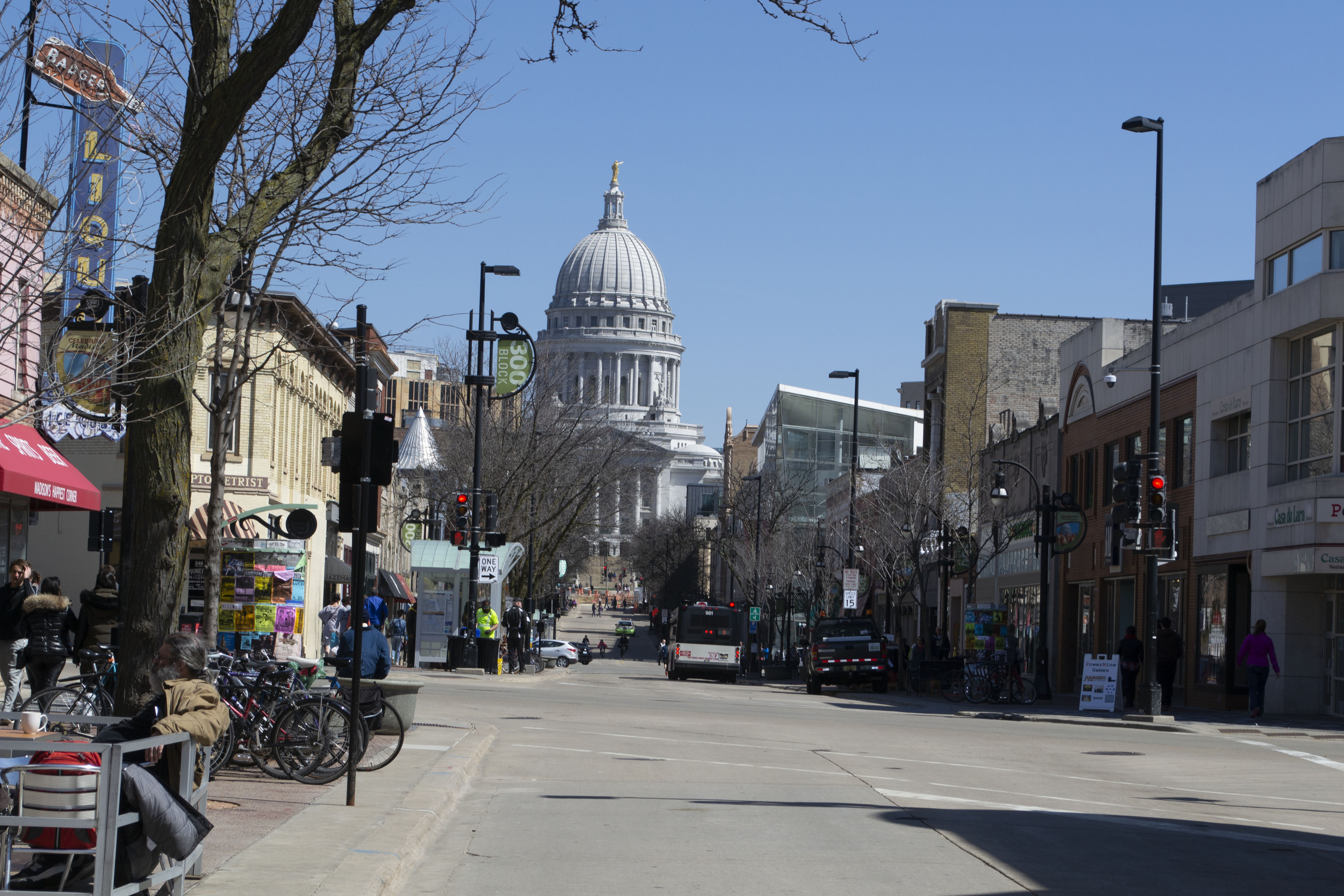
Wisconsin State Capitol viewed from State Street

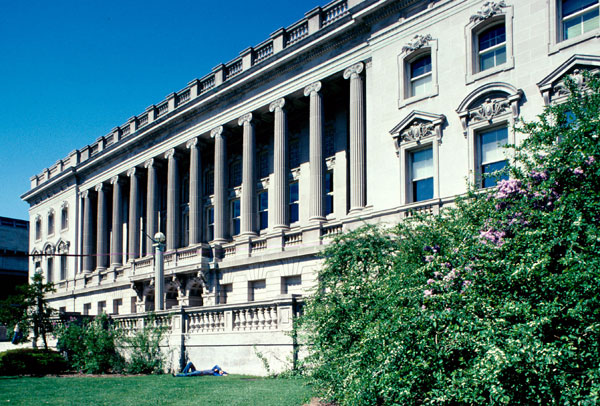
Wisconsin Historical Society

== List of past representatives ==
List of representatives to the Wisconsin State Assembly from the 77th district
Member	Party	Residence	Counties represented	Term start	Term end	Ref.
District created
Midge Miller	Dem.	Madison	Dane	January 1, 1973	January 3, 1983	
Calvin Potter	Dem.	Kohler	Sheboygan	January 3, 1983	January 7, 1985	
Spencer Black	Dem.	Madison	Dane	January 7, 1985	January 3, 2011	
Brett Hulsey	Dem.	Madison	Dane	January 3, 2011	January 3, 2013	
Terese Berceau	Dem.	Madison	Dane	January 3, 2013	January 7, 2019	
Shelia Stubbs	Dem.	Madison	Dane	January 7, 2019	January 6, 2025	
Renuka Mayadev	Dem.	Madison	Dane	January 6, 2025	Current	
