= Patterson Joint Unified School District =

K-12 school district

Address
- 510 Keystone Boulevard Patterson, California, 95363; United States

District information
- Type: Public
- Motto: Ensure excellence in education and cultivate healthy, contributing citizens!
- Grades: K–12
- Established: 1963; 63 years ago
- Superintendent: Phillip Alfano
- Schools: 15
- Budget: $30.3 million
- NCES District ID: 0630030

Students and staff
- Students: 6,012 (2020–2021)
- Teachers: 287.07 (FTE)
- Staff: 302.49 (FTE)
- Student–teacher ratio: 20.94:1

Other information
- Unions: California Teachers Association, California School Employees Association
- Website: www.patterson.k12.ca.us

Patterson Joint Unified is a K-12 school district located in Patterson, California on the west side of Stanislaus County. It is designated as a joint district because its boundaries include portions of Stanislaus and Santa Clara counties, and it is a unified district because it has elementary and high schools.

== Governance ==
The district is governed by a seven-member Board of Education. Members of the board are elected directly by voters within the district, which encompasses Patterson, Westley, Grayson, and unincorporated areas of Stanislaus and Santa Clara counties. In 2013, the Board moved from at-large to trustee area elections.

The seven members of the Board of Education as of December 2015 are Michele Bays, Carlos Fierros, Alyssa Homen, James Leonard, Grace McCord, Michael McLaughlin, and Jose Reynoso. The district's current superintendent is Phillip Alfano (2012–present).

== Schools ==
Patterson currently operates 1 comprehensive high school, 1 continuation high school, 1 middle school, 1 K-8 school, 1 dependent charter school, 4 elementary schools, 5 state preschools, and 1 fee-based preschool.

- Apricot Valley Elementary
- Creekside Middle School
- Del Puerto High School
- Grayson Charter
- Las Palmas Elementary
- Northmead Elementary
- Patterson High School
- Rising Sun
- Walnut Grove School
- West Valley Learning Center
- Preschool
