= Jimmy Anderson (politician) =

American politician (born 1986)

Jimmy P. Anderson

Member of the Wisconsin State Assembly from the 47th district
- In office January 3, 2017 – January 6, 2025
- Preceded by: Robb Kahl
- Succeeded by: Randy Udell

Personal details
- Born: James Paul Anderson; August 26, 1986 (age 40) El Paso, Texas, U.S.
- Party: Democratic
- Education: California State University, Monterey Bay (BA); University of Wisconsin Law School (JD)
- Occupation: Nonprofit director, lawyer

James Paul "Jimmy" Anderson (born August 26, 1986) is an American lawyer and Democratic politician from Fitchburg, Wisconsin. He served four terms as a member of the Wisconsin State Assembly, representing Wisconsin's 47th Assembly district from 2017 to 2025.

== Early life and car accident ==
Jimmy Anderson was born in El Paso, Texas, and raised and educated in Patterson, California; he graduated from Patterson High School in 2004. He went on to attend California State University, Monterey Bay, where he earned his bachelor's degree in 2008. He continued his education at the University of Wisconsin Law School.

On August 24, 2010, while visiting his family in California for his 24th birthday, Anderson and his family were involved in a severe car accident when a drunk driver ran a stop sign, traveling at more than 60 miles per hour, and rammed the Anderson family's SUV. Jimmy's parents and younger brother were all killed in the accident; Jimmy was paralyzed from the chest down. The drunk driver also died in the accident After months of physical therapy, learning to breathe and swallow again, Anderson regained some limited use of his arms and hands. After a year off to recuperate from his trauma, Anderson returned to his law studies and earned his J.D. from the University of Wisconsin Law School in 2012. After law school, Anderson chose to remain in Fitchburg, Wisconsin.

Anderson sued the government of Stanislaus County, California, in 2011. The suit alleged that the county shared liability in the accident because it had failed to improve safety at that intersection after a 2005 petition from county residents. The county eventually settled with Anderson in 2014, paying him $8.25 million. His lawyer, however, noted that his ongoing medical expenses would likely eat up the entire settlement.

While grieving his family, studying for law school, and managing his own recovery, Anderson also had to struggle against insurance companies to pay for his treatment and ongoing disability. Before the Affordable Care Act was implemented, he quickly approached the lifetime coverage limit on his health insurance plan. In response to his personal trauma, Anderson also started a nonprofit called "Drive Clear", with the objective of making breathalyzers more available to drivers.

== Political career ==
Anderson's advocacy, and his interactions with the health insurance industry, led him into politics. Anderson would frequently talk about how important the Affordable Care Act was in his own life, and how he had reacted to Wisconsin's Republican governor Scott Walker campaigning against the health care law. Noting that his home district state representative, Democrat Robb Kahl, had voted for Walker in the 2010 election, Anderson announced that he would make his first bid for elected office to launch a primary challenge against Kahl in 2016. Kahl announced a month later that he would not run for re-election. Ultimately two other Democrats joined the primary contest in the overwhelmingly Democratic district; Anderson prevailed by 496 votes over Fitchburg city councilmember Julia Arata-Fratta. He went on to win four terms in the Assembly, serving from 2017 to 2025.

In 2019 and 2020, Anderson had a very public dispute with the Wisconsin Assembly speaker, Robin Vos, over floor rules which he suggested were discriminating against people like him with limited mobility. Vos ultimately relented, but included the change in a package of other partisan rule changes which Anderson was ultimately forced to vote against; the rule changes passed without Democratic support.

In November 2023, Anderson's state senator, Melissa Agard, announced that she would run for Dane County executive in 2024, and would therefore not run for re-election to the Wisconsin Senate. The open seat in the heavily Democratic 16th Senate district attracted all three incumbent state representatives living within that Senate district to jump into the Democratic primary and forgo their Assembly re-elections. Anderson was the first to join the race, announcing his candidacy in December 2023, followed by Melissa Ratcliff of Cottage Grove and Samba Baldeh of Madison. All three were progressive Democrats, running on a similar policy platform of expanding Medicaid and defending abortion rights, so the race would ultimately come down to personalities and coalitions. Ratcliff won the primary with 52% of the vote.

== Electoral history ==
=== Wisconsin Assembly (2016–2022) ===
Year	Election	Date	Elected				Defeated				Total	Plurality
2016	Primary	Aug. 9	Jimmy Anderson	Democratic	3,517	44.58%	Julia Arata-Fratta	Dem.	3,021	38.29%	7,889	496
2016	Primary	Aug. 9	Jimmy Anderson	Democratic	3,517	44.58%	H. Tony Hartmann	Dem.	1,336	16.93%	7,889	496
2016	General	Nov. 8	Jimmy Anderson	Democratic	19,154	68.47%	Adam Dahl	Ind.	8,596	30.73%	27,976	10,558
2018	General	Nov. 6	Jimmy Anderson (inc)	Democratic	25,706	98.02%	--unopposed--				26,226	
2020	General	Nov. 3	Jimmy Anderson (inc)	Democratic	27,947	74.89%	Phil Anderson	Rep.	9,331	25.00%	37,317	18,616
2022	General	Nov. 8	Jimmy Anderson (inc)	Democratic	23,843	79.90%	Lamonte Newsom	Rep.	5,975	20.02%	29,842	17,868

=== Wisconsin Senate (2024) ===
Year	Election	Date	Elected				Defeated				Total	Plurality
2024	Primary	Aug. 13	Melissa Ratcliff	Democratic	17,205	52.04%	Jimmy Anderson	Dem.	10,258	31.03%	33,063	6,947
2024	Primary	Aug. 13	Melissa Ratcliff	Democratic	17,205	52.04%	Samba Baldeh	Dem.	5,575	16.86%	33,063	6,947

Wisconsin State Assembly
Preceded by Robb Kahl	Member of the Wisconsin State Assembly from the 47th district January 3, 2017 – January 6, 2025	Succeeded by Randy Udell
