= Oak Hall, Wisconsin =

- Former unincorporated community
- Location within Wisconsin Location within the United States
- Coordinates: 42°57′1.6″N 89°26′13.8″W
- Country: United States
- State: Wisconsin
- County: Dane County
- City: Fitchburg
- Time zone: UTC-6 (Central (CST))
  - Summer (DST): UTC-5 (CDT)
- Area code: 608

Oak Hall is an unincorporated community in the city of Fitchburg, Dane County, Wisconsin, United States. It is located at the intersection of Fish Hatchery Road (County Highway D) and County Highway M just north of the town and village of Oregon. Once part of the Town of Fitchburg, it became part of the city of Fitchburg when it was incorporated in 1983. The area remains distinct from the neighborhoods being built near it.

== See also ==
- Fitchburg Center, Fitchburg, Wisconsin
