= Renuka Mayadev =

21st century American politician

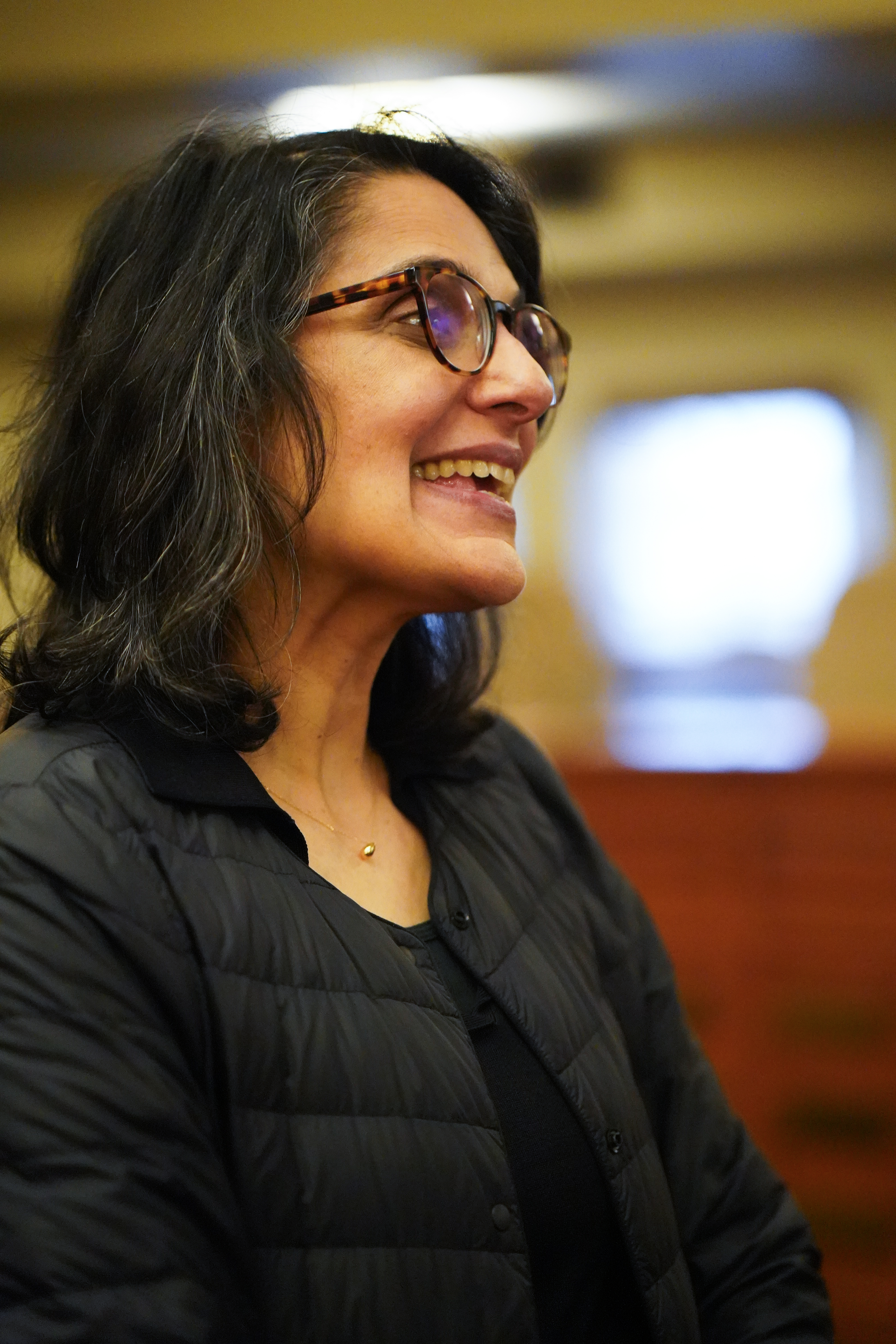
- Mayadev in 2026

Member of the Wisconsin State Assembly from the 77th district
- Incumbent
- Assumed office January 6, 2025
- Preceded by: Shelia Stubbs

Personal details
- Born: 1974 (age 51–52) Columbus, Ohio, U.S.
- Party: Democratic
- Spouse: Daniel Tokaji
- Children: 2
- Education: Georgetown University Law Center; Northwestern University
- Profession: Legislator, politician, nonprofit executive
- Website: Official website Campaign website

Renuka Mayadev (born 1974) is an American nonprofit executive and Democratic politician from Madison, Wisconsin. She is a member of the Wisconsin State Assembly, representing Wisconsin's 77th Assembly district since January 2025. Before taking office she served as a program advisor for the University of Wisconsin School of Medicine and Public Health. Originally from Ohio, she served as a policy advisor to Ohio governor Ted Strickland from 2008 to 2011.

== Early life and career ==
Mayadev was born in Columbus, Ohio, in 1974. She attended public schools in Columbus. Mayadev later attended Northwestern University, majoring in economics. She later attended Georgetown University Law Center, where she got her degree.

After completing her education, Mayadev served in the office of Ohio Governor Ted Strickland, where she was a policy advisor on juvenile justice, public safety, and workers' compensation, among other issues. Later she entered the private sector, working as an executive for the nonprofit United Way - Central Ohio. She also served as the Executive Director for the Children's Defense Fund - Ohio for six years.

During her time at the Children's Defense Fund, Mayadev worked with civil rights activist Marian Wright Edelman.

From 2021 to 2024, Mayadev served on the Wisconsin Early Childhood Association Board of Directors.

== Political career ==
In 2024, Wisconsin underwent a major redistricting, following the Wisconsin Supreme Court's decision to strike down the previous Republican gerrymander. Madison-area districts were significantly affected by the redistricting. The 77th Assembly district shifted to encompass nearly all of the University of Wisconsin–Madison campus and its surrounding residential neighborhoods in central Madison; the changes shifted the district's incumbent representative, Shelia Stubbs, into a neighboring district, leaving the new 77th district as an open seat.

Mayadev was one of three candidates to seek the Democratic Party's nomination in the heavily Democratic 77th district, the other two being Dane County supervisor Chuck Erickson and pharmacist Thad Schumacher. In the primary, Mayadev was endorsed by several prominent Wisconsin Democrats, including former governor Jim Doyle and incumbent Madison state senator Kelda Roys. She went on to win the nomination with 48% of the vote in the August primary election.

As no Republican candidates filed to run, Mayadev was elected without opposition in the November general election and took office in January 2025. In May 2025, Mayadev formed the first Asian Caucus in the Wisconsin Legislature with representatives Angelito Tenorio of West Allis and Francesca Hong of Madison's east side.

== Personal life ==
Mayadev lives in Madison with her husband and two children. Her husband, Daniel Tokaji, is the Dean of the University of Wisconsin Law School.

== Electoral history ==
=== Wisconsin Assembly (2024) ===
Year	Election	Date	Elected				Defeated				Total	Plurality
2024	Primary	Aug. 13	Renuka Mayadev	Democratic	4,802	48.80%	Thad Schumacher	Dem.	2,784	28.30%	9,840	5,038
2024	Primary	Aug. 13	Renuka Mayadev	Democratic	4,802	48.80%	Chuck Erickson	Dem.	2,241	22.77%	9,840	5,038
2024	General	Nov. 5	Renuka Mayadev	Democratic	29,888	98.35%	--unopposed--				30,388	29,388

Wisconsin State Assembly
Preceded by Shelia Stubbs	Member of the Wisconsin State Assembly from the 77th district January 6, 2025 – present	Incumbent
