= Shelia Stubbs =

American politician (born 1971)

Member of the Wisconsin State Assembly
- Incumbent
- Assumed office January 6, 2025
- Preceded by: Lisa Subeck
- Constituency: 78th district
- In office January 7, 2019 – January 6, 2025
- Preceded by: Terese Berceau
- Succeeded by: Renuka Mayadev
- Constituency: 77th district

Member of the Board of Supervisors of Dane County, Wisconsin, from the 23rd district
- In office April 2006 – April 2022
- Preceded by: Don Eggert

Personal details
- Born: Shelia Renee Hoskins; February 22, 1971 (age 55) Camden, Arkansas, U.S.
- Party: Democratic
- Spouse: Godfrey Stubbs
- Children: 1
- Education: Tougaloo College (BA); Mount Senario College (BS); Cardinal Stritch University (MSM)
- Profession: probation officer
- Salary: $57,408
- Website: Official website Campaign website

Shelia Renee Stubbs (née Hoskins; born February 22, 1971) is an American pastor, former probation and parole agent, and Democratic politician from Madison, Wisconsin. She is a member of the Wisconsin State Assembly, representing the south side of the city of Madison since 2019. She is the first African American to represent Dane County in the Wisconsin Legislature. She also previously served 16 years as a member of the Dane County Board of Supervisors (2006–2022), and was the only African American member from 2006 to 2020.

== Early life and career ==
Shelia Stubbs was born Shelia Renee Hoskins in Camden, Arkansas, in February 1971. As a child, she moved with her family to Beloit, Wisconsin, where she was raised and educated; her uncle, Walter Knight, served on Beloit's city council and its police and fire commission. She graduated from Beloit Memorial High School and attended Tougaloo College, earning a baccalaureate degree in political science. She went on to study at Mount Senario College, earning a second baccalaureate, in criminal justice management, and then earned a master's in management at Milwaukee's Cardinal Stritch University. She has been a member of Delta Sigma Theta sorority since April 2003.

She worked for eight years as a probation and parole agent with the Wisconsin Department of Corrections before first being elected to the Dane County Board of Supervisors in 2006.

== Political career ==
Democratic incumbent Terese Berceau announced on February 2, 2018, that she would not be running for re-election from the 77th Assembly district, and Stubbs announced her own candidacy the same day. With the Democratic nomination tantamount to winning in this heavily-Democratic district, she acquired three opponents (and Berceau's endorsement). In the primary election, she achieved a plurality of fractionally under 50% of the votes, with 7,758 to Shabnam Lotfi's 5,611 (36%), John Imes' 1,222 (8%) and Mark Garthwaite's 968 (6%). Unopposed in the general election for the 2019–2020 Assembly term, Stubbs became the first African-American woman to represent a Dane County district in the legislature, and was the only African-American woman in the Assembly.

=== Police call ===
Stubbs's campaign attracted national news coverage when during her canvassing in a predominantly-white neighborhood, a call was made to the Madison Police Department reporting her and her family (she was with her daughter and mother) as "They are waiting for drugs at the local drug house — would like them moved along." (She did not announce the incident until after the primary.) An anonymous letter purporting to be from the person who made the call, and emphasizing "but I never called the police on you, on a woman of color in the neighborhood... I called on a car, not you" has been received by a local television station.

== Personal life and family ==
Shelia Stubbs is the daughter of Linda Hoskins, a former president of the Madison chapter of the NAACP.

Shelia Hoskins took the last name Stubbs when she married bishop Godfrey Stubbs. The Stubbs' are co-founders of End Time Ministries International Church in Madison; they have one school-age daughter.

== Electoral history ==
=== Wisconsin Assembly, 77th district (2018–2022) ===
Year	Election	Date	Elected				Defeated				Total	Plurality
2018	Primary	Aug. 14	Shelia Stubbs	Democratic	7,760	49.82%	Shabnam Lotfi	Dem.	5,612	36.03%	15,577	2,148
2018	Primary	Aug. 14	Shelia Stubbs	Democratic	7,760	49.82%	John Imes	Dem.	1,222	7.84%	15,577	2,148
2018	Primary	Aug. 14	Shelia Stubbs	Democratic	7,760	49.82%	Mark Garthwaite	Dem.	968	6.21%	15,577	2,148
2018	General	Nov. 6	Shelia Stubbs	Democratic	29,347	98.68%	--unopposed--				29,741	
2020	General	Nov. 3	Shelia Stubbs (inc)	Democratic	30,741	98.80%	--unopposed--				31,113	
2022	General	Nov. 8	Shelia Stubbs (inc)	Democratic	27,839	98.70%	--unopposed--				28,205	

=== Wisconsin Assembly, 78th district (2024–present) ===
Year	Election	Date	Elected				Defeated				Total	Plurality
2024	Primary	Aug. 13	Shelia Stubbs	Democratic	9,574	65.78%	Maia Pearson	Dem.	4,956	34.05%	14,554	4,618
2024	General	Nov. 5	Shelia Stubbs	Democratic	29,638	98.15%	--unopposed--				30,198	

Wisconsin State Assembly
Preceded by Terese Berceau	Member of the Wisconsin State Assembly from the 77th district January 7, 2019 – January 6, 2025	Succeeded by Renuka Mayadev
Preceded by Lisa Subeck	Member of the Wisconsin State Assembly from the 78th district January 6, 2025 – present	Incumbent
