= Robb Kahl =

American lawyer and politician (born 1972)

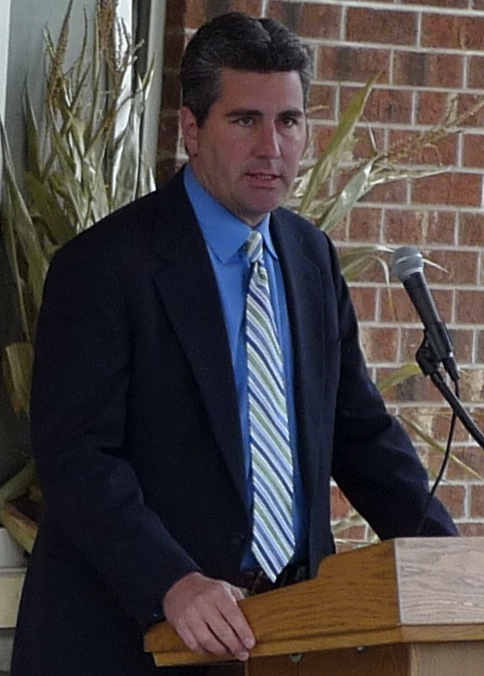
- Kahl in 2009

Member of the Wisconsin State Assembly from the 47th district
- In office January 7, 2013 – 2017
- Preceded by: Keith Ripp
- Succeeded by: Jimmy P. Anderson

Personal details
- Born: January 5, 1972 (age 54) Menomonee Falls, Wisconsin
- Party: Democratic
- Education: Ripon College (B.A.); University of Wisconsin Law School (J.D.)
- Profession: Politician

Robb Kahl (born January 5, 1972) is an American lawyer and politician.

From Monona, Wisconsin, Kahl graduated from Ripon College and received his J.D. degree from University of Wisconsin Law School. Kahl practiced law and served as Mayor of Monona. In November 2012, Kahl was elected to the Wisconsin State Assembly as a Democrat. Kahl announced in May 2016 that he would not seek reelection to the Wisconsin Assembly.
