= Patterson High School (California) =

Location
- 200 N. 7th Street; Patterson, California 95363; United States
- Coordinates: 37.47093°N 121.13801°W

Information
- School district: Patterson Joint Unified School District
- CEEB code: 052430
- Principal: Dave Smith
- Teaching staff: 85.28 (FTE)
- Grades: 9-12
- Enrollment: 1,855 (2023–2024)
- Student to teacher ratio: 21.75
- Colors: Crimson and gray
- Athletics: CIF Sac-Joaquin Section
- Athletics conference: Western Athletic Conference
- Mascot: Tiger
- Newspaper: PHS Tiger Times
- Website: www.patterson.k12.ca.us/phs/

Patterson High School is located in the town of Patterson in Stanislaus County, California. It is in the Patterson Joint Unified School District.

The school is known for the Aztec Calendar mural on the library wall painted by Circulo de Hombres. It is 12 feet (3.7 m) in diameter like the real Aztec calendars.

== Programs ==
Patterson High School offers many athletic, agricultural, and performing art programs. Music programs include marching band, concert band, choir, orchestra, color guard, winter guard, and winter percussion ensemble.

== Notable alumni ==
- Jimmy Anderson, Wisconsin state legislator
- Pedro Tovar, Singer
