= Monona Terrace =

Convention center in Madison, Wisconsin

- Monona Terrace from Lake Monona
- Interactive map of the Monona Terrace area

General information
- Location: 1 John Nolen Drive, Madison, Wisconsin, U.S.
- Coordinates: 43°4′18″N 89°22′50″W
- Groundbreaking: January 25, 1995
- Opened: July 18, 1997

Design and construction
- Architects: Frank Lloyd Wright; Anthony Puttnam
- Architecture firm: Taliesin Associated Architects

Website
- mononaterrace.com

Monona Terrace (officially the Monona Terrace Community and Convention Center) is a convention center on the shores of Lake Monona in Madison, Wisconsin, United States. Initially proposed by Wisconsin-born architect Frank Lloyd Wright in 1938, the 250,000 square feet (23,000 m^{2}) building opened in 1997 and attracts nearly 400,000 visitors annually.

== History ==
Monona Terrace was originally designed and proposed by Frank Lloyd Wright in 1938 but rejected by the Dane County development board by one vote. Wright would continue to seek support for the plan and alter its design until his death in 1959. For the next four decades, various proposals for a convention center on the Monona Terrace land would be considered and rejected. Several times, it appeared that supporters of the project would be able to secure the public financing to complete the project, but various forces (such as the start of World War II) inevitably sidelined the plan.

In 1990, Madison mayor Paul Soglin resurrected Wright's proposal. Among the arguments against its construction, opponents argued that it was not a genuine Wright building, that the costs were too steep for the taxpayers to bear and that the construction would adversely affect the environment, specifically destroying the view of Lake Monona from street level on the south side of the Capitol Square. Additionally, the site of the land stands on historic Ho-Chunk Nation burial mounds.

The proposed construction was approved by a public referendum in 1992, and construction began on January 25, 1995. The building was constructed by J.H. Findorff and Son Inc., a southern Wisconsin contractor. Although the exterior design is Wright's, the interior as executed was designed by former Wright apprentice Anthony Puttnam of Taliesin Associated Architects. Monona Terrace Community and Convention Center opened on July 18, 1997, nearly 60 years after the design was first proposed by Wright.

== Facilities ==
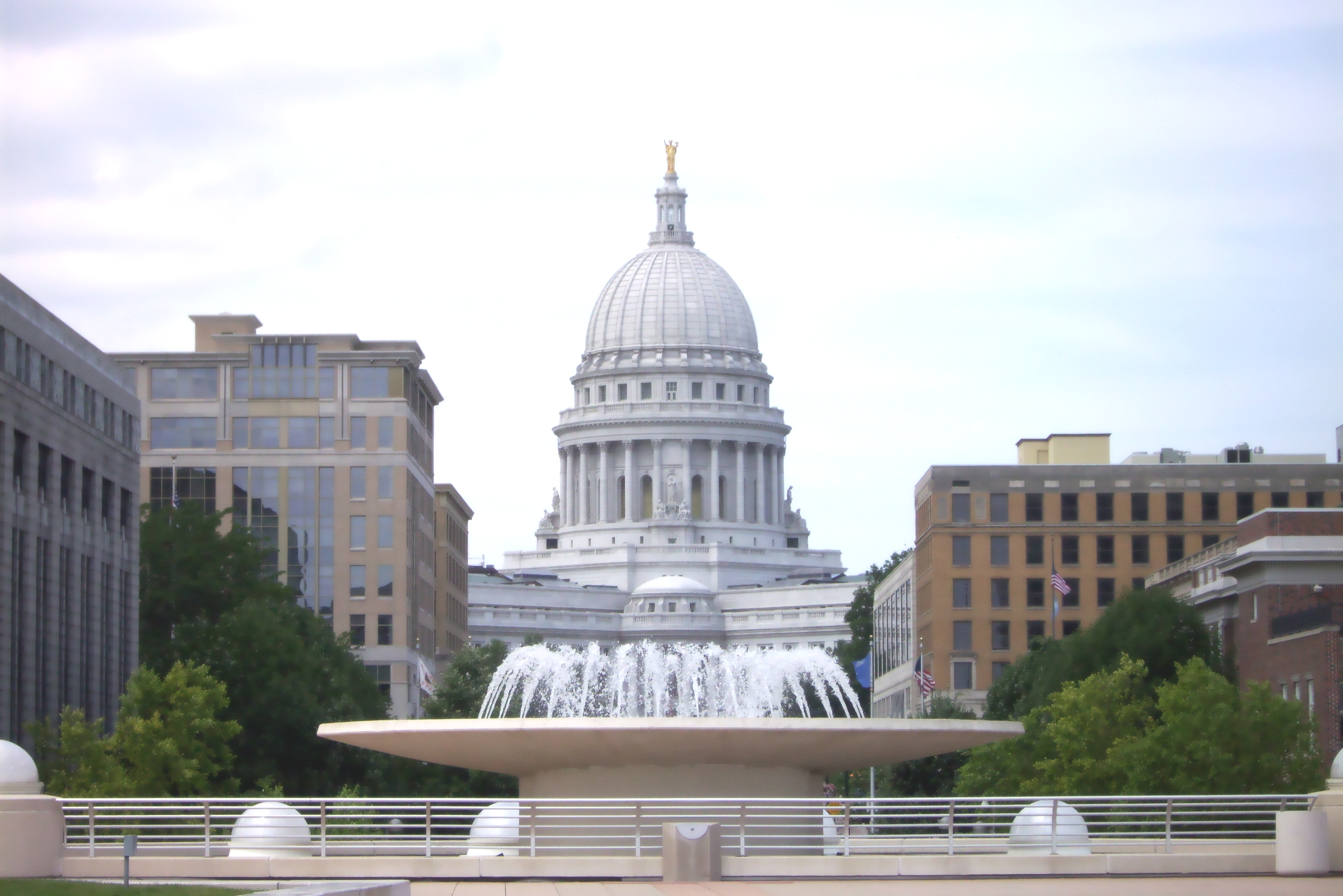
View of the Wisconsin State Capitol building overlooking Monona Terrace and the water fountain

Monona Terrace is located two blocks from the Wisconsin State Capitol building in downtown Madison. From the roof of Monona Terrace, one can see downtown Madison, including the Capitol and Lake Monona.

The facility hosts over 600 conventions, meetings and weddings each year that result in an average of $52 million in economic activity for the region. Monona Terrace also runs free community programs that serve approximately 56,000 people each year. Monona Terrace also offers guided tours, a gift shop, a rooftop cafe (warm weather months only), and serves as the home for some of the community's events including the national radio variety show Michael Feldman's Whad'Ya Know?, Dane Dances, Ironman Wisconsin, and US Bank Eve.

== Gallery ==
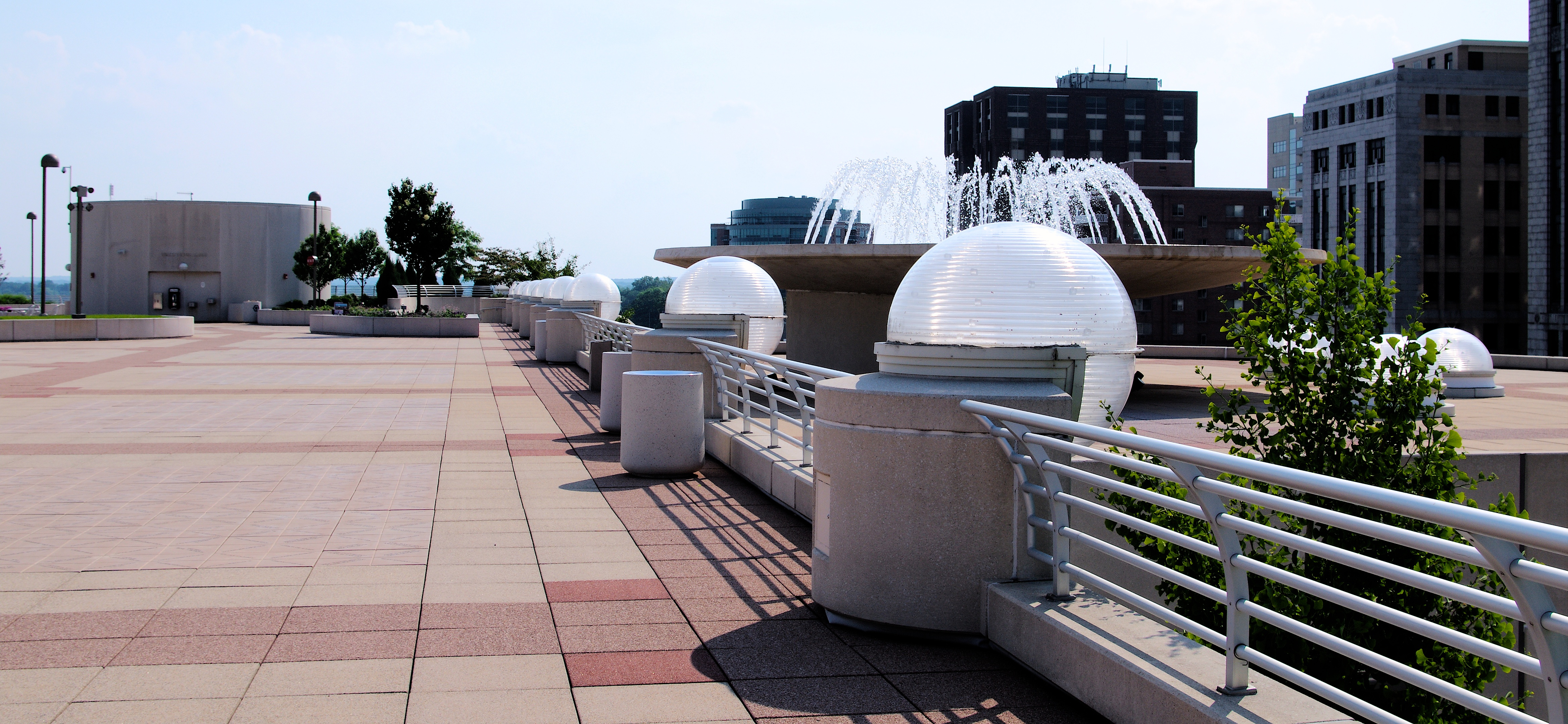

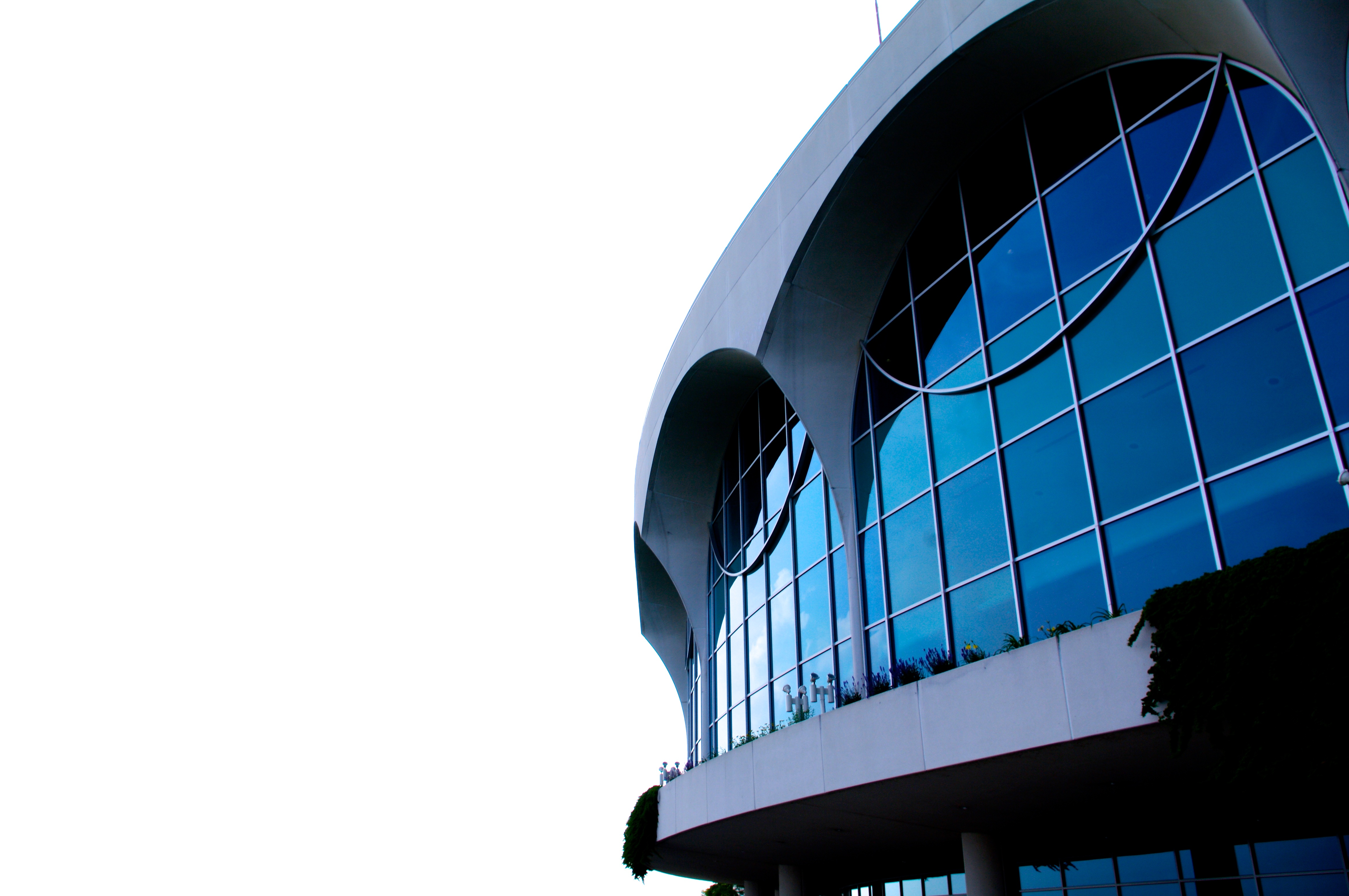

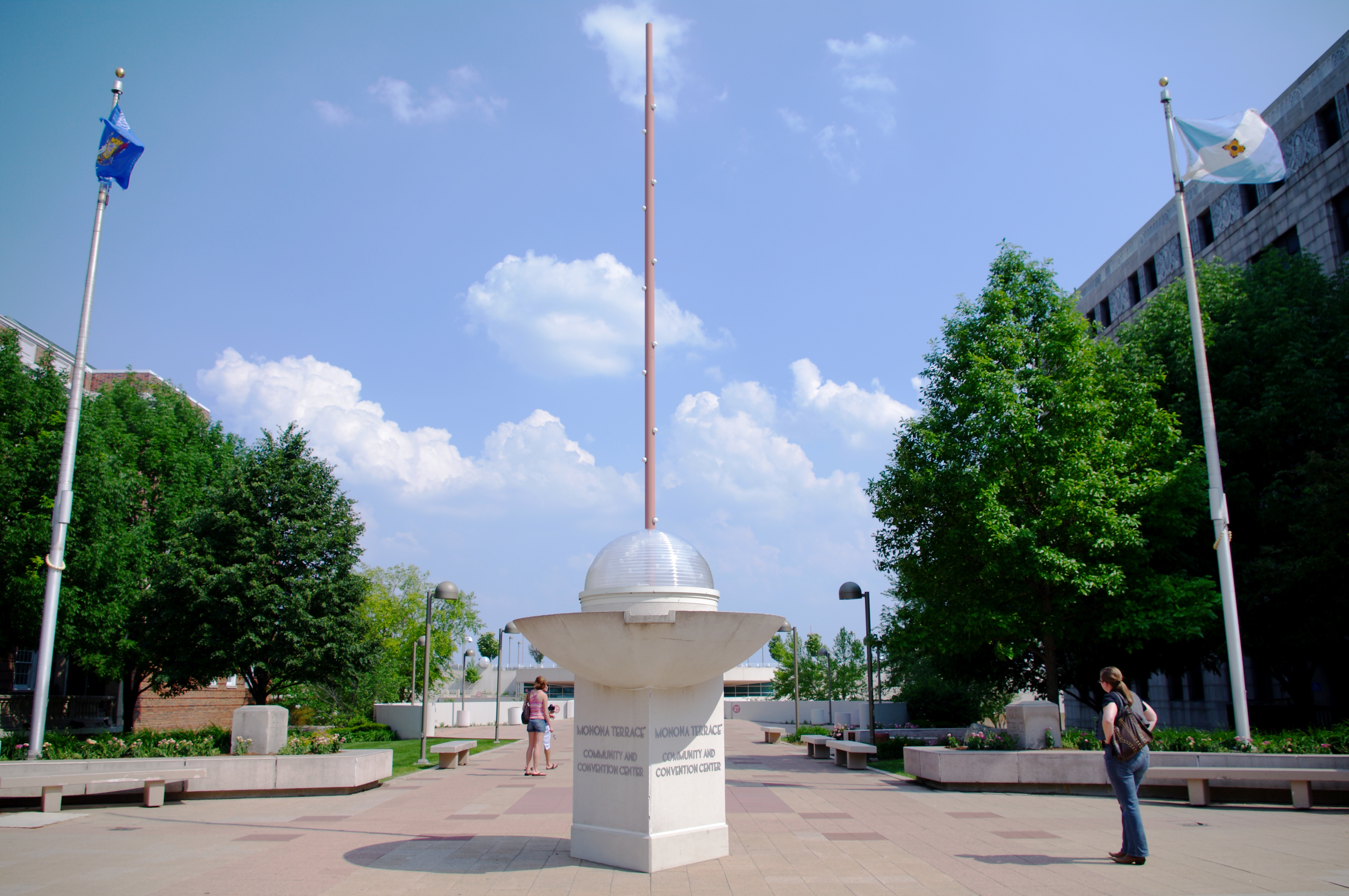

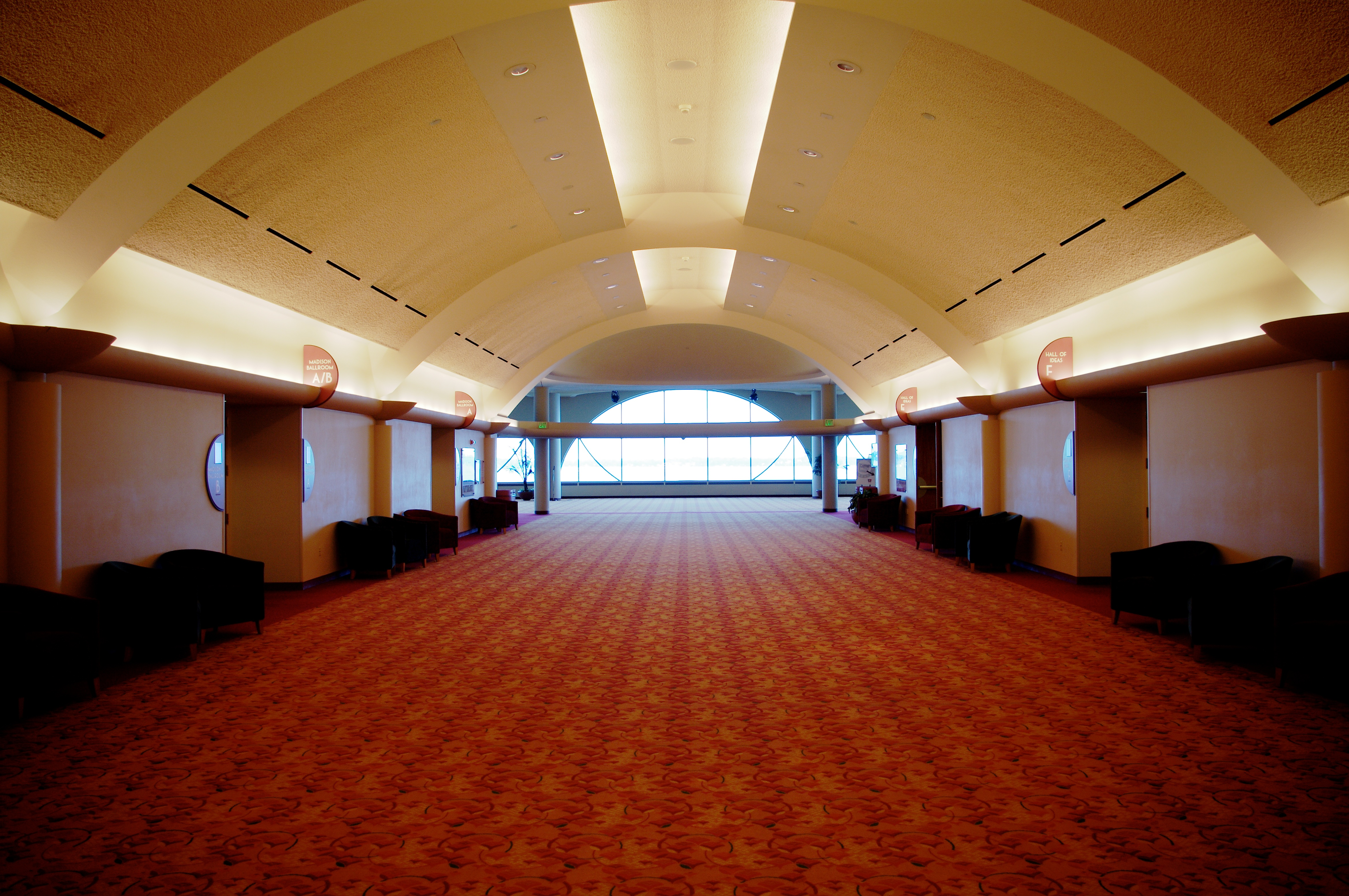

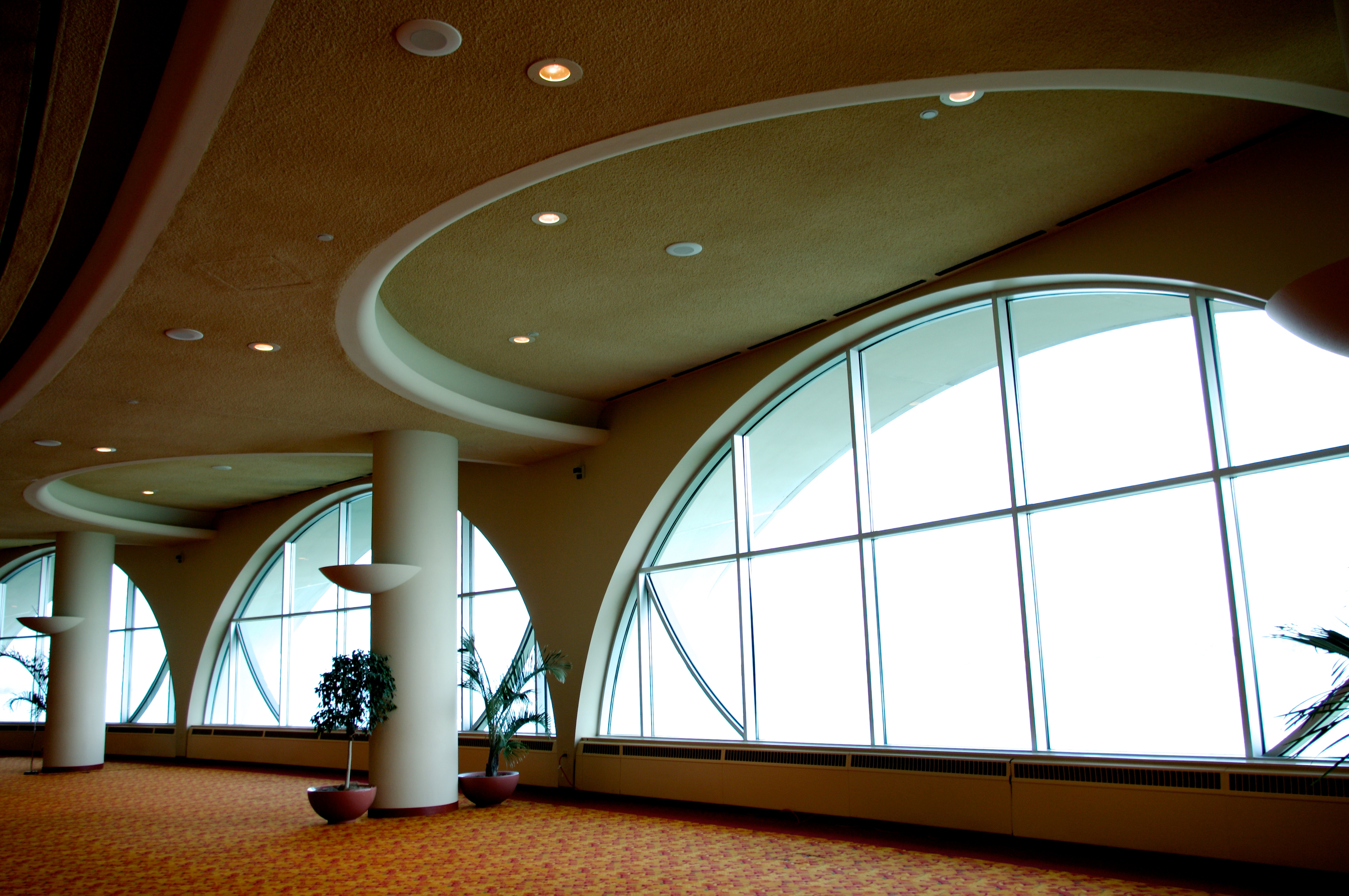

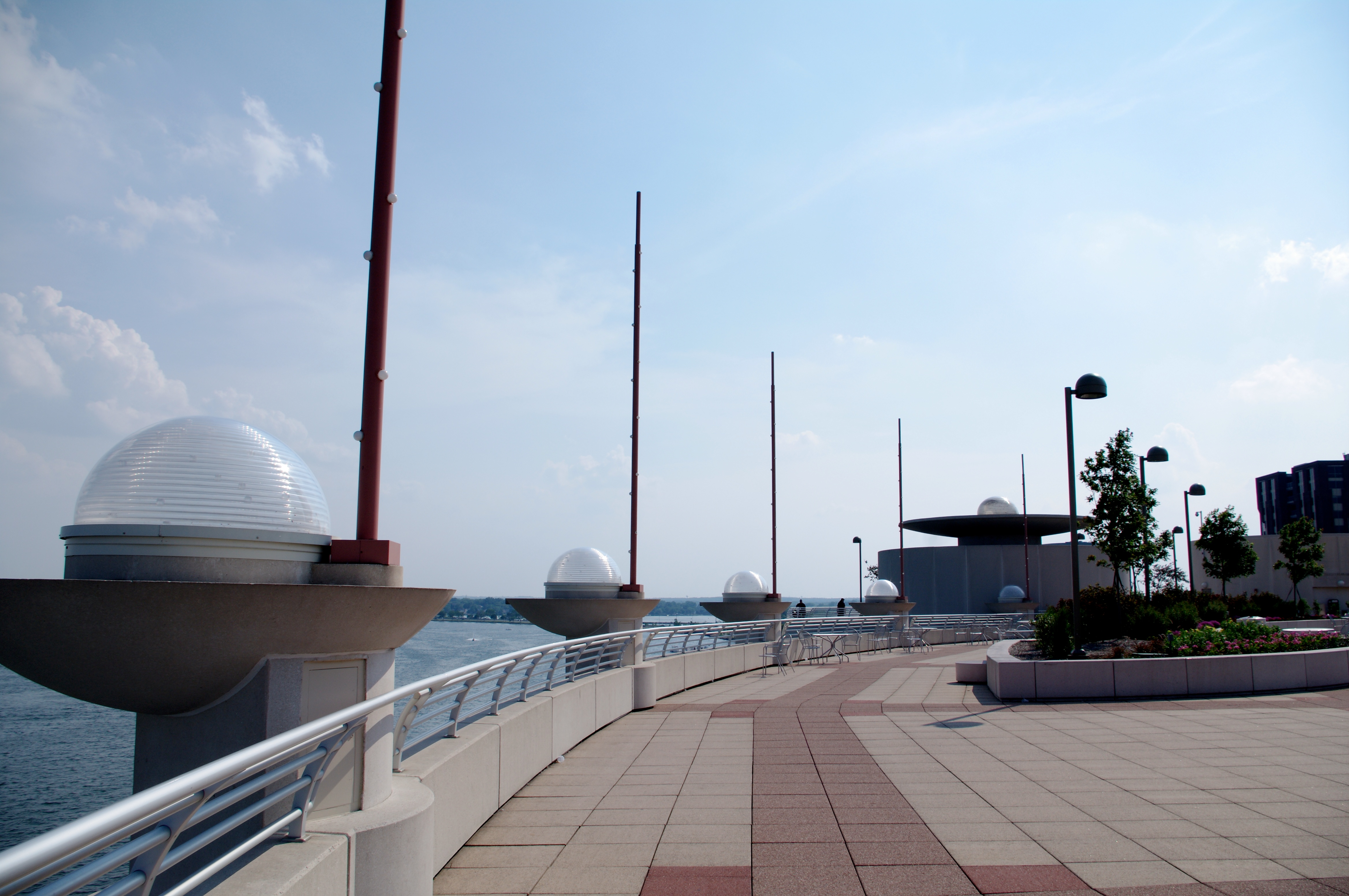

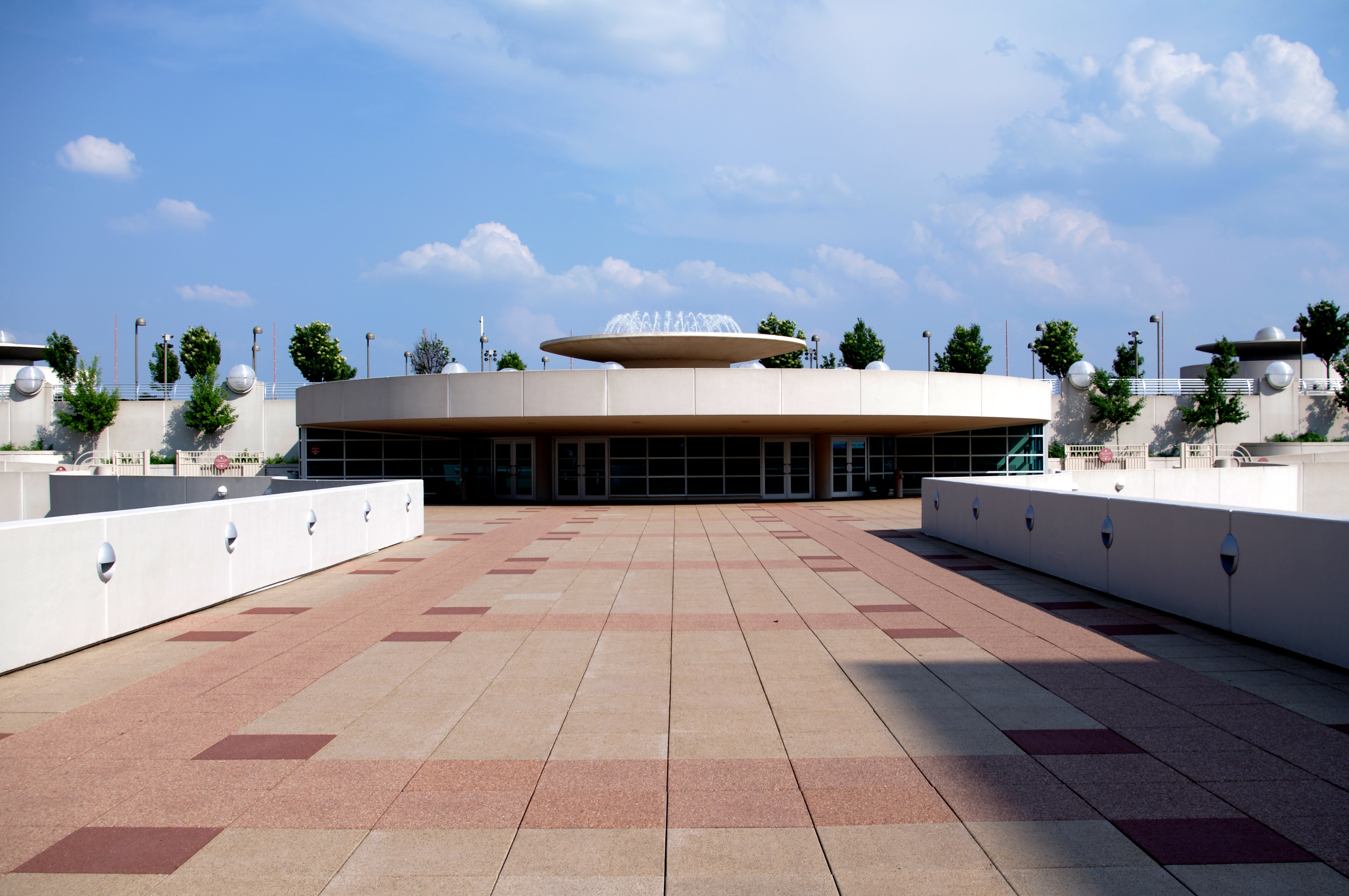

== See also ==
- List of Frank Lloyd Wright works
