= 2026 Wisconsin gubernatorial election =

- November 3, 2026
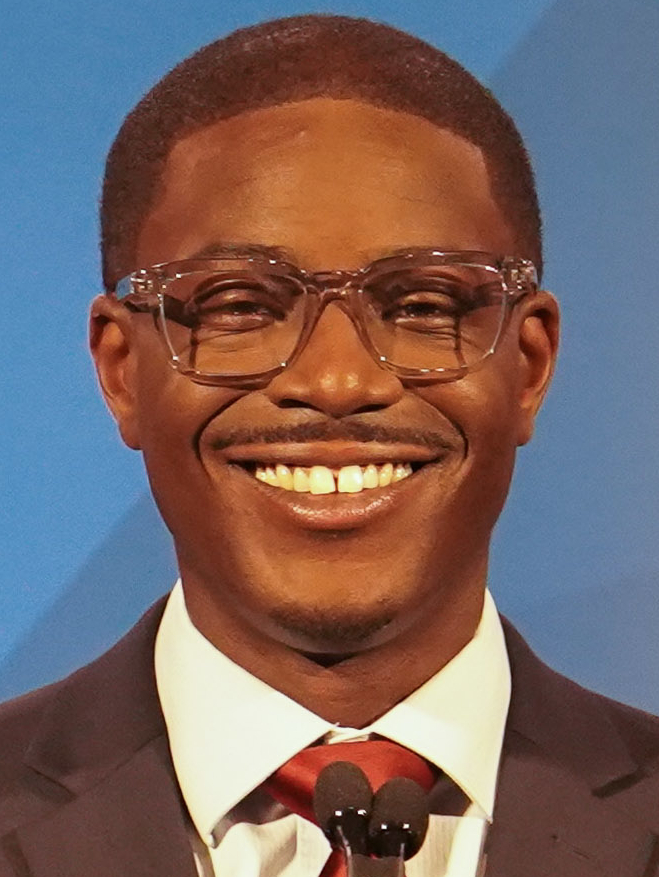

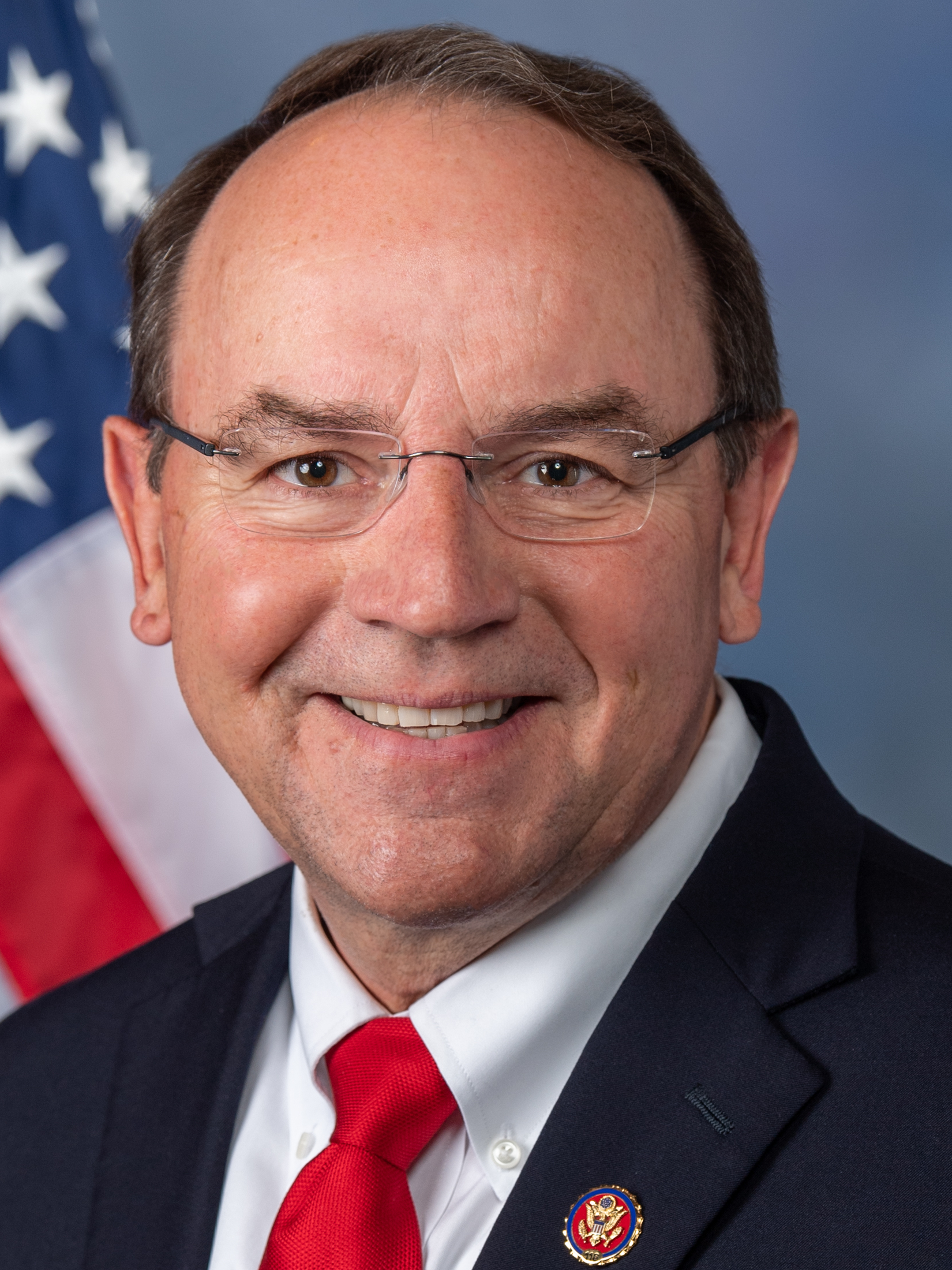
Nominee	David Crowley	Tom Tiffany
Party	Democratic	Republican
Running mate	Sarah Godlewski	David Varnam
Popular vote	1,440,993	1,227,676
Percentage	54.00%	46.00%
- Crowley: 50–60% 60–70% 70–80% 80–90% Tiffany: 50–60% 60–70% 70–80%
Governor before election
Tony Evers
Democratic
Elected Governor
David Crowley
Democratic

The 2026 Wisconsin gubernatorial election was held on November 3, 2026, to elect the governor of Wisconsin. The Democratic nominee, Milwaukee County executive David Crowley, was elected governor, defeating Republican U.S. representative Tom Tiffany. When sworn in in January 2027, Crowley will become the first African-American governor of Wisconsin and the fifth African-American governor in U.S. history.

Incumbent Democratic governor Tony Evers did not seek re-election to a third term, making this the first open-seat gubernatorial election in Wisconsin since 2010. Crowley's victory represents the first time since 1962 that Democrats have won a third consecutive gubernatorial election in Wisconsin.

Primary elections were held on August 11, 2026. Tiffany won the Republican nomination without serious challenge. Crowley, despite having temporarily withdrawn his candidacy, won the Democratic nomination in an upset victory over state representative Francesca Hong, receiving 39.8% of the vote.

Crowley's victory was part of a national Democratic wave in the 2026 elections, which also saw Wisconsin Democrats gain control of the state Senate and Assembly, achieving their first governing trifecta since 2009–2010. Crowley's margin of victory—just over eight percentage points—is the largest margin of victory in a Wisconsin gubernatorial election since Tommy Thompson's third re-election in 1998, and the largest margin for a Democrat since Thompson's predecessor, Tony Earl, won election with 57% of the vote in 1982.

Crowley's running mate on the Democratic ticket was Sarah Godlewski, the incumbent secretary of state and former state treasurer; she was unopposed in the lieutenant gubernatorial primary. Tiffany's running mate was David Varnam, the former mayor of Lancaster, Wisconsin; the Republican Party of Wisconsin had endorsed and supported Will Martin in the lieutenant gubernatorial primary, but Varnam won the nomination in an upset.

== Background ==
Wisconsin is considered to be a purple state at the federal and state levels with a uniquely competitive track record (presidential races decided by less than a point in 2016, 2020, and 2024; Senate races decided by roughly a point in 2022 and 2024; and a governor's race decided by a point in 2018). The past two federal election cycles in Wisconsin featured split outcomes, with Democrats winning for governor and Republicans for Senate in 2022 and Democrats winning for Senate and Republicans for president in 2024. Wisconsin has voted with the winner of the last five presidential elections, and in 2024 it had the second-highest voter turnout in the country (behind Minnesota) and one of the biggest turnout increases in the country. Both parties have seen success in the state in recent years. Republicans narrowly control both chambers of the Wisconsin Legislature and hold a majority in Wisconsin's U.S. House delegation. However, Democrats control most statewide executive offices and have won the last two gubernatorial races.

Incumbent Democratic governor Tony Evers was first elected in 2018, narrowly defeating incumbent Republican Scott Walker. He was re-elected by a slightly larger margin in 2022, defeating Republican businessman Tim Michels. In July 2025, Evers announced he would not seek re-election to a third term. The race is widely seen as a tossup due to Evers's retirement and the state's even partisan lean.

== Democratic primary ==
=== Governor ===
Tony Evers's decision not to seek re-election triggered a competitive Democratic primary. The Associated Press described the process leading up to the August 11 primary as chaotic. Lieutenant Governor Sara Rodriguez amassed support as a centrist candidate until she dropped out in mid-July, prompting Milwaukee County executive David Crowley to re-enter the race ten days after withdrawing. The race became a showdown between Crowley, who was endorsed by Evers and other establishment figures, and state representative Francesca Hong, a democratic socialist. Crowley narrowly won the Democratic nomination in an upset victory over Hong, as polls showed him trailing Hong by nearly 20 points just a week earlier.

==== Candidates ====
===== Nominee =====
- David Crowley, Milwaukee County Executive (2020–present) (previously withdrew, endorsed Rodriguez)

===== Eliminated in primary =====
- Joel Brennan, former secretary of the Wisconsin Department of Administration (2019–2022)
- Francesca Hong, state representative from the 76th district (2021–present)
- Kelda Roys, state senator from the 26th district (2021–present), candidate for Wisconsin's 2nd congressional district in 2012, and candidate for governor in 2018

===== Withdrawn =====
- Mandela Barnes, former lieutenant governor (2019–2023) and nominee for U.S. Senate in 2022 (remained on ballot)
- Missy Hughes, former CEO of the Wisconsin Economic Development Corporation (2019–2025) (remained on ballot; endorsed Rodriguez, later endorsed Crowley)
- Brett Hulsey, former state representative from the 78th district (2011–2015) and candidate for governor in 2014 (endorsed Crowley)
- Tim Jacobson, Oshkosh Defense assembler (ran for Winnebago County Board of Supervisors)
- Sara Rodriguez, lieutenant governor (2023–present) (remained on ballot)
- Ryan Strnad, stadium vendor (endorsed Crowley)

===== Disqualified =====
- Kirk Bangstad, business owner

===== Declined =====
- Tony Evers, incumbent governor (2019–present) (endorsed Crowley)
- Sarah Godlewski, Wisconsin Secretary of State (2023–present) and candidate for U.S. Senate in 2022 (running for lieutenant governor)
- Cavalier Johnson, mayor of Milwaukee (2021–present) (endorsed Crowley)
- Josh Kaul, Attorney General of Wisconsin (2019–present) (running for re-election)
- Tip McGuire, state representative from the 64th district (2019–present) (running for re-election)
- Ben Wikler, former chair of the Wisconsin Democratic Party (2019–2025) and candidate for Democratic National Committee chair in 2025

==== Endorsements ====
Joel Brennan

Executive branch officials

- Tom Barrett, former U.S. ambassador to Luxembourg (2022–2025) and former Mayor of Milwaukee

Statewide officials

- Dennis Conta, former secretary of the Wisconsin Department of Revenue (1977–1979)
- Mark Meyer, former Wisconsin Public Service Commissioner (2004–2010)
- Dan Schooff, former secretary of the Wisconsin Department of Administration (2010–2011)

State legislators

- Janet Bewley, former minority leader of the Wisconsin Senate (2020–2023) from SD-25 (2015–2023)
- Chester Gerlach, AD-3 (1975–1985)
- Jim Holperin, SD-12 (2009–2013)
- Robert Jauch, former minority leader of the Wisconsin Senate (1993–1995) from SD-25 (1987–2015)
- Shirley Krug, former minority leader of the Wisconsin State Assembly (1998–2001) from AD-12 (1985–2005)
- Walter Kunicki, former Assembly Speaker (1991–1995) from AD-8 (1981–1999)
- Brad Pfaff, SD-32 (2021–present)
- Judy Robson, former majority leader of the Wisconsin Senate (2007) from SD-15 (1999–2011)
- Donna Seidel, AD-85 (2005–2013)
- Mike Sheridan, former Assembly Speaker (2009–2011) from AD-44 (2005–2011)
- Kevin Soucie, AD-7 (1975–1981)
- Dana Wachs, AD-91 (2013–2019)
- James Wahner, former majority leader of the Wisconsin State Assembly (1977–1980) from AD-15 (1971–1980)

Local officials

- John Antaramian, former mayor of Kenosha (1992–2008, 2016–2024)
- John Medinger, former mayor of La Crosse (1997–2005)
- John Robinson, member of the Marathon County board of supervisors (1974–1981, 2006–present)
- Tony Staskunas, member of the Milwaukee County Board of Supervisors from the 16th district (2013–present)

Party officials

- Jeffrey Neubauer, former chair of the Democratic Party of Wisconsin (1989–1993)
David Crowley

U.S. Representatives

- Gregory Meeks, NY-05 (1998–present)
- Gwen Moore, WI-04 (2005–present)

Statewide officials

- Tony Evers, governor of Wisconsin (2019–present)
- Missy Hughes, former CEO of the Wisconsin Economic Development Corporation (2019–2025) (previously endorsed Rodriguez)

State legislators

- Dora Drake, SD-4 (2024–present)
- Kalan Haywood, AD-16 (2019–present)
- Brett Hulsey, AD-78 (2011–2015)
- Melissa Ratcliff, SD-16 (2025–present)
- Lisa Subeck, AD-79 (2015–present)

Local officials

- Alicia Halvensleben, mayor of Waukesha (2026–present)
- Cavalier Johnson, mayor of Milwaukee (2021–present)
- Dennis McBride, mayor of Wauwatosa (2020–present)

Labor unions

- IAFF Locals 215 & 1848
- International Brotherhood of Electrical Workers Wisconsin State Conference
- International Union of Operating Engineers Local 139
- Professional Fire Fighters of Wisconsin
- Northern Midwest Regional Council of Carpenters
- Plumbers Union Local 75
- Wisconsin Laborers' District Council

Organizations

- Congressional Black Caucus PAC

Newspapers

- The Shepherd Express (co-endorsement with Roys)
Francesca Hong

U.S. representatives

- Ro Khanna, CA-17 (2017–present)
- Ilhan Omar, MN-05 (2019–present)

State legislators

- Ryan Clancy, AD-19 (2023–present)
- Gary George, former president pro tempore of the Wisconsin State Senate (1999–2003) from SD-6 (1981–2003)
- Chris Larson, SD-7 (2011–present)
- Angelito Tenorio, AD-14 (2025–present)
- Nina Turner, former Ohio state senator, SD-25 (2008–2014)

Individuals

- Kat Abughazaleh, journalist and social media influencer
- Hasan Piker, political commentator
- Qasim Rashid, attorney

Labor unions

- OPEIU Local 39
- Service Employees International Union Wisconsin

Organizations

- AAPI Victory Fund
- Center for Freethought Equality (co-endorsement with Roys)
- Citizen Action of Wisconsin
- Madison Area Democratic Socialists of America
- Milwaukee Democratic Socialists of America
- Twin Ports Democratic Socialists of America
- Our Wisconsin Revolution
- Our Revolution
- Young Progressive Democrats of America
Kelda Roys

Executive branch officials

- Thomas Loftus, former U.S. ambassador to Norway (1993–1997)

Statewide officials

- Barbara Lawton, former lieutenant governor of Wisconsin (2003–2011)

U.S. representatives

- Steve Kagen, WI-08 (2007–2011)

State legislators

- Brienne Brown, AD-43 (2025–present)
- Chris Danou, AD-91 (2009–2013), AD-92 (2013–2017)
- Dave Hansen, former majority leader of the Wisconsin Senate (2010–2011) from SD-30 (2001–2021)
- Sarah Keyeski, SD-14 (2025–present)
- Jessica King, SD-18 (2011–2013)
- Karen Kirsch, AD-7 (2025–present)
- Donna Seidel, AD-85 (2004–2013)
- Gary Sherman, AD-74 (1999–2010)
- Ryan Spaude, AD-89 (2025–present)
- Mark Spreitzer, SD-15 (2023–present)
- Robert Wirch, SD-22 (1997–present) (previously endorsed Rodriguez)

Local officials

- Tom Nelson, Outagamie County executive (2011–present)
- John Norquist, former mayor of Milwaukee (1988–2004)

Labor unions

- Wisconsin Education Association Council

Organizations

- Vote Run Lead
- Center for Freethought Equality (co-endorsement with Hong)

Newspapers

- The Shepherd Express (co-endorsement with Crowley)
Mandela Barnes (withdrawn, remained on ballot)

U.S. senators

- Adam Schiff, California (2024–present)

State legislators

- Angelina Cruz, AD-62 (2025–present)
- Tod Ohnstad, AD-65 (2013–2025)
- Sandy Pasch, AD-10 (2013–2015), AD-22 (2009–2013)
- Amaad Rivera-Wagner, AD-90 (2025–present)

Local officials

- Eric Genrich, mayor of Green Bay (2019–present)

Individuals

- LeVar Burton, actor

Labor unions

- United Auto Workers Wisconsin State CAP Council
- United Food and Commercial Workers Local 1473

Organizations

- Collective PAC
- End Citizens United
- NRDC Action Fund
Sara Rodriguez (withdrawn, remained on ballot)

Statewide officials

- Austin Davis, lieutenant governor of Pennsylvania (2023–present)
- ~~Missy Hughes, former CEO of the Wisconsin Economic Development Corporation (2019–2025)~~ (endorsed Crowley after Rodriguez withdrew)
- Martin J. Schreiber, former governor of Wisconsin (1977–1979)

State legislators

- Ben DeSmidt, AD-65 (2025–present)
- Joan Fitzgerald, AD-46 (2025–present)
- Gary Hebl, AD-46 (2005–2023)
- Andrew Hysell, AD-48 (2025–present)
- Beth Meyers, AD-74 (2015–2023)
- Maureen McCarville, AD-42 (2025–present)
- Sylvia Ortiz-Velez, AD-8 (2021–present)
- Janis Ringhand, SD-15 (2015–2023)
- ~~Robert Wirch, SD-22 (1997–present)~~ (endorsed Roys after Rodriguez withdrew)

Municipal officials

- ~~David Crowley, Milwaukee County Executive (2020–current~~) (re-entered race)
- Paul Soglin, former mayor of Madison (1973–1979, 1989–1997, 2011–2019)

Labor unions

- AFSCME Council 32

Organizations

- 314 Action
- Democratic Lieutenant Governors Association
Declined to endorse

U.S. senators

- Bernie Sanders, Vermont (2007–present) (Independent)

U.S. representatives

- Alexandria Ocasio-Cortez, NY-14 (2019–present)
- Mark Pocan, WI-02 (2013–present)

Organizations

- Democratic Socialists of America

==== Fundraising ====
Italics indicate a withdrawn candidate

Campaign finance reports as of July 15, 2026
Candidate	Raised	Spent	Cash on hand
Mandela Barnes (D)	$1,397,005	$1,196,887	$204,207
Joel Brennan (D)	$1,231,839	$872,254	$359,583
David Crowley (D)	$1,039,328	$724,579	$316,178
Francesca Hong (D)	$1,077,568	$667,690	$410,563
Missy Hughes (D)	$613,841	$588,052	$26,788
Sara Rodriguez (D)	$1,180,101	$657,178	$34,990
Kelda Roys (D)	$882,886	$612,361	$408,482
Source: Wisconsin Ethics Commission

==== Polling ====
The company Median Strategies released a poll purporting to show Hong with a 20-percentage point lead in the primary. However, the poll was later revealed as fabricated.

Aggregate polls

Source of poll aggregation	Dates administered	Dates updated	Mandela Barnes	David Crowley	Francesca Hong	Other/ Undecided (Note: Calculated by taking the difference of 100% and all other candidates combined.)	Margin
270toWin	July 22 – August 6, 2026	October 21, 2026	13.5%	16.5%	45.0%	23.9% (Note: Kelda Roys with 7.5%; Joel Brennan with 4.5%; Sara Rodriguez with 3.0%)	Hong +28.5%

Poll source	Date(s) administered	Sample size (Note: Key: A – all adults RV – registered voters LV – likely voters V – unclear)	Margin of error	Mandela Barnes	Joel Brennan	David Crowley	Francesca Hong	Sara Rodriguez	Kelda Roys	Missy Hughes	Other	Undecided
State Navigate	August 3–6, 2026	1,473 (LV)	± 2.3%	6% (Note: With voters who lean towards a given candidate)	5%	22%	44%	3%	11%	0%	—	9%
State Navigate	August 3–6, 2026	1,473 (LV)	± 2.3%	3% (Note: With voters who lean towards a given candidate and withdrawn-candidate push)	5%	24%	44%	3%	11%	0%	—	10%
State Navigate	August 3–6, 2026	1,473 (LV)	± 2.3%	5%	5%	21%	42%	3%	10%	0%	—	14%
Public Policy Polling (D) (Note: Poll sponsored by Crowley's campaign)	August 4–5, 2026	753 (LV)	—	—	—	24%	42%	—	—	—	—	—
	July 30, 2026	Barnes withdraws from the race										
Marquette University	July 22–27, 2026	407 (RV)	± 6.6%	21%	4%	11%	46%	—	4%	—	—	14%
Marquette University	July 22–27, 2026	407 (RV)	± 6.6%	16%	2%	7%	38%	—	2%	—	—	34%
State Navigate (Note: Poll sponsored by Main Street Action and UpNorthNews)	July 23–26, 2026	1,085 (LV)	± 3.0%	14%	4%	15%	44%	4%	4%	1%	—	13%
State Navigate	July 23–26, 2026	1,085 (LV)	± 3.0%	13%	4%	12%	42%	3%	4%	1%	—	22%
Public Policy Polling (D)	July 20–22, 2026	708 (LV)	—	15%	3%	14%	35%	—	5%	—	—	28%
Impact Research (D) (Note: Poll sponsored by Barnes' campaign)	July 18–20, 2026	621 (LV)	—	26%	6%	11%	39%	—	7%	—	—	11%
	July 18, 2026	Crowley re-enters the race										
	July 17, 2026	Rodriguez withdraws from the race										
Marquette University	July 8–16, 2026	430 (RV)	± 6.1%	15%	2%	—	26%	11%	1%	—	—	45%
Marquette University	July 8–16, 2026	430 (RV)	± 6.1%	18%	5%	—	27%	—	2%	—	—	48%
	July 8, 2026	Crowley withdraws from the race, endorses Rodriguez										
The Public Sentiment Institute (Note: Poll sponsored by the Great Lakes Perspective)	May 13–15, 2026	880 (RV); 877 (LV)	± 4.2%	24%	2%	8%	9%	12%	—	0%	8%	39%
Marquette University	March 11–18, 2026	393 (RV)	± 6.7%	11%	—	3%	14%	3%	1%	1%	—	65%
Patriot Polling (R)	March 10–16, 2026	— (LV)	—	27%	—	6%	18%	6%	—	—	43%	
Marquette University	February 11–19, 2026	394 (RV)	± 6.9%	10%	2%	3%	11%	6%	1%	2%	1% (Note: Brett Hulsey with 1%)	65%
TIPP Insights (R) (Note: Poll sponsored by the League of American Workers, a conservative advocacy group founded by Steve Cortes, former senior advisor to President Donald Trump.)	February 6–12, 2026	1,524 (RV)	± 2.7%	28%	0%	7%	5%	20%	2%	1%	1% (Note: Brett Hulsey with 1%)	35%
	December 2, 2025	Barnes enters the race										
Marquette University	October 15–22, 2025	378 (RV)	± 6.9%	—	3%	—	6%	4%	3%	2%	0% (Note: Brett Hulsey and Ryan Strnad with 0%)	81%

Hypothetical polling

with Josh Kaul and Sarah Godlewski

Poll source	Date(s) administered	Sample size	Margin of error	David Crowley	Francesca Hong	Mandela Barnes	Sara Rodriguez	Josh Kaul	Sarah Godlewski	Other	Undecided
TIPP Insights (R)	November 17–21, 2025	589 (LV)	—	6%	—	21%	6%	8%	3%	3% (Note: Kelda Roys with 1%; Missy Hughes with 2%)	52%
Platform Communications	September 28–30, 2025	— (LV)	—	7%	4%	16%	8%	7%	—	19% (Note: Kelda Roys with 4%; Missy Hughes with 2%; Ben Wikler with 1%; "None of the candidates" with 12%)	39%

==== Debate and forums ====
2026 Wisconsin gubernatorial election Democratic primary debate and candidate forums
No.	Date	Host	Moderator	Link	Democratic	Democratic	Democratic	Democratic	Democratic	Democratic	Democratic
Key: P Participant A Absent N Not invited I Invited W Withdrawn											
Key: P Participant A Absent N Not invited I Invited W Withdrawn					Mandela Barnes	Joel Brennan	David Crowley	Francesca Hong	Missy Hughes	Sara Rodriguez	Kelda Roys
1	Jan. 21, 2026	Civic Media; Main Street Action	Dan Shafer	YouTube	P	P	P	P	P	P	P
2	Apr. 14, 2026	Citizen Action of Wisconsin	Priscilla Bort; Robert Kraig	YouTube	P	P	P	P	P	P	P
3	Jul. 28, 2026	Marquette University; WISN-TV	Gerron Jordan; Matt Smith	YouTube	P	P	P	P	W	W	P

==== Results ====
Primary results by county: Crowley: 30–40%; 40–50%; Hong: 30–40%; 40–50%

Primary results by precinct: Crowley: 20–30%; 30–40%; 40–50%; 50–60%; 60–70%; 70–80%; 80–90%; >90%; Hong: 20–30%; 30–40%; 40–50%; 50–60%; 60–70%; 70–80%; 80–90%; >90%; Roys: 20–30%; 30–40%; 40–50%; 50–60%; Brennan: >90%; Barnes: 40–50%; >90%; Tie: 20–30%; 30–40%; 40–50%; 50%; No Votes

Democratic primary results
Party	Candidate	Votes	%
Democratic	David Crowley	315,413	39.81
Democratic	Francesca Hong	311,740	39.35
Democratic	Kelda Roys	59,394	7.50
Democratic	Joel Brennan	37,084	4.68
Democratic	Sara Rodriguez (withdrawn)	32,674	4.12
Democratic	Mandela Barnes (withdrawn)	32,435	4.09
Democratic	Missy Hughes (withdrawn)	3,230	0.41
Democratic	Brett Hulsey (write-in; withdrawn)	13	0.00
Democratic	Tim Reppen (write-in)	10	0.00
Write-in		297	0.04
Total votes		792,290	100.0

=== Lieutenant governor ===
==== Candidates ====
===== Nominee =====
- Sarah Godlewski, Wisconsin Secretary of State (2023–present) and candidate for U.S. Senate in 2022

===== Declined =====
- Sara Rodriguez, incumbent lieutenant governor (2023–present) (ran for governor)

==== Endorsements ====
Sarah Godlewski

U.S. representatives

- Mark Pocan, WI-02 (2013–present)

Statewide officials

- Barbara Lawton, former lieutenant governor of Wisconsin (2003–2011)

Local officials

- Eric Genrich, mayor of Green Bay (2019–present)
- Cavalier Johnson, mayor of Milwaukee (2021–present)
- Satya Rhodes-Conway, mayor of Madison (2019–present)

Labor unions

- Wisconsin AFL-CIO

Organizations

- Fair Wisconsin

==== Fundraising ====
Campaign finance reports as of July 15, 2026
Candidate	Raised	Spent	Cash on hand
Sarah Godlewski (D)	$292,267	$230,391	$77,917
Source: Wisconsin Ethics Commission

==== Results ====
Democratic primary results
Party	Candidate	Votes	%
Democratic	Sarah Godlewski	661,675	99.57
Write-in		2,853	0.43
Total votes		664,528	100.0

== Republican primary ==
Tom Tiffany, a member of the House Freedom Caucus, was expected to obtain the nomination without meaningful challenge. Tiffany received an endorsement from Donald Trump, who Tiffany believes may have won the 2020 presidential election. As a member of the federal House, Tiffany objected to the certification of Pennsylvania's and Arizona's electoral results on January 6, 2021, and was prevented from objecting to Wisconsin's electoral results because the Capitol building was stormed by pro-Trump insurgents. He has kept mention of Trump to a minimum during his primary campaign.

=== Governor ===
==== Candidates ====
===== Nominee =====
- Tom Tiffany, U.S. representative for Wisconsin's 7th congressional district (2020–present)

===== Eliminated in primary =====
- Andy Manske, medical service technician

===== Withdrawn =====
- Bill Berrien, manufacturing executive
- Josh Schoemann, Washington County Executive (2020–present)

===== Declined =====
- Rohn W. Bishop, mayor of Waupun, Wisconsin (2022–present)
- Eric Hovde, bank executive, nominee for U.S. Senate in 2024 and candidate in 2012
- Ron Johnson, U.S. senator (2011–present)
- Mary Felzkowski, president of the Wisconsin Senate (2025–present) from the 12th district (2021–present)
- Bill McCoshen, WTMJ-TV host and owner of the Janesville Jets
- Tim Michels, co-owner of the Michels Corporation, nominee for governor in 2022 and U.S. Senate in 2004
- Matt Neumann, business owner
- Bryan Steil, U.S. representative for Wisconsin's 1st congressional district (2019–present) (running for re-election; endorsed Tiffany)
- Tommy Thompson, former governor (1987–2001), former U.S. Secretary of Health and Human Services (2001–2005), and nominee for U.S. Senate in 2012 (endorsed Tiffany)
- Scott Walker, former governor (2011–2019)

==== Endorsements ====
Tom Tiffany

Executive branch officials

- Tommy Thompson, former secretary of health and human services (2001–2005) and former governor (1987–2001)
- Donald Trump, president of the United States (2017–2021, 2025–present)
- JD Vance, vice-president of the United States (2025–present)

U.S. representatives

- Tom Emmer, House Majority Whip (2023–present) from MN-06 (2015–present)
- Scott Fitzgerald, WI-05 (2021–present)
- Glenn Grothman, WI-06 (2015–present)
- Harriet Hageman, WY-AL (2023–present)
- Jim Jordan, OH-04 (2007–present)
- Troy Nehls, TX-22 (2021–present)
- Bryan Steil, WI-01 (2019–present)
- Derrick Van Orden, WI-03 (2023–present)
- Tony Wied, WI-08 (2024–present)

State officials

- Kelly Armstrong, governor of North Dakota (2024–present)

State Legislators

- Angie Sapik former state representative from the 73rd district (2023–2025)

Municipal officials

- 21 county sheriffs (Note: Chippewa County; Clark County; Lincoln County; Marathon County; Oneida County; Polk County; Price County; Rusk County; Shawano County; St. Croix County; Forest County; Langlade County; Monroe County; Oconto County; Washburn County; Pierce County; Sauk County; Taylor County; Waukesha County; Waupaca County; Wood County)

Labor unions

- Kenosha Professional Police Association
- Milwaukee Police Association

Political parties

- Republican Party of Wisconsin

Organizations

- Americans for Prosperity Wisconsin
- College Republicans of America
- Turning Point Action
- Wisconsin College Republicans
- Wisconsin Farm Bureau Federation Volunteers for Agriculture
- Wisconsin Young Republicans

==== Fundraising ====
Campaign finance reports as of December 31, 2025
Candidate	Raised	Spent	Cash on hand
Andy Manske (R)	$1,484	$114	$1,370
Tom Tiffany (R)	$10,842,318	$7,854,693	$2,998,334
Source: Wisconsin Ethics Commission

==== Polling ====
Poll source	Date(s) administered	Sample size	Margin of error	Bill Berrien	Andy Manske	Josh Schoemann	Tom Tiffany	Other	Undecided
Marquette University	July 8–16, 2026	399 (RV)	± 6.5%	—	2%	—	67%	—	30%
Marquette University	March 11–18, 2026	396 (RV)	± 6.3%	—	6%	—	40%	0% (Note: "Refused" with 0%)	54%
Patriot Polling (R)	March 10–16, 2026	— (LV)	—	—	8%	—	65%	27%	
Marquette University	February 11–19, 2026	371 (RV)	± 6.4%	—	2%	—	35%	—	63%
	January 28, 2026	Schoemann withdraws from the race							
Marquette University	October 15–22, 2025	406 (RV)	± 6.9%	—	0%	6%	23%	—	70%
	September 26, 2025	Berrien withdraws from the race							
Fabrizio, Lee & Associates (R)	July 28–31, 2025	600 (LV)	± 4.0%	10%	—	13%	40%	—	37%

Hypothetical polling

Poll source	Date(s) administered	Sample size	Margin of error	Eric Hovde	Josh Schoemann	Mary Felzkowski	Tim Michels	Tom Tiffany	Other	Undecided
TIPP Insights (R)	November 17–21, 2025	586 (LV)	—	25%	5%	—	12%	17%	2% (Note: Kevin Nicholson with 2%)	37%
Platform Communications	September 28–30, 2025	— (LV)	—	14%	4%	1%	9%	30%	9% (Note: "None of the candidates" with 9%)	33%

==== Results ====
Republican primary results
Party	Candidate	Votes	%
Republican	Tom Tiffany	468,019	95.32
Republican	Andy Manske	22,573	4.60
Republican	Dennis Williams (write-in)	17	0.00
Write-in		404	0.08
Total votes		491,013	100.0

=== Lieutenant governor ===
==== Candidates ====
===== Nominee =====
- David Varnam, former mayor of Lancaster (2016–2022) and candidate for lieutenant governor in 2022

===== Eliminated in primary =====
- Will Martin, former director of strategic workforce initiatives for the Wisconsin Department of Workforce Development and candidate for lieutenant governor in 2022

===== Withdrawn =====
- Nick Polce, business owner and candidate for Wisconsin's 1st congressional district in 2018 (ran for state senate)

===== Did not file =====
- Cyril Sablich, college student
- John Totz, Oakfield school board member

==== Endorsements ====
Will Martin

Political parties

- Republican Party of Wisconsin
David Varnam

U.S. representatives

- Derrick Van Orden, WI-03 (2023–present)

==== Fundraising ====
Campaign finance reports as of July 15, 2026
Candidate	Raised	Spent	Cash on hand
Will Martin (R)	$225,842	$72,031	$153,811
David Varnam (R)	$66,529	$54,748	$12,892
Source: Wisconsin Ethics Commission

==== Results ====
Primary results by county: Varnam: 50–60%; 60–70%; 70–80%; Martin: 50–60%

Primary results by precinct: Varnam: 40–50%; 50–60%; 60–70%; 70–80%; 80–90%; >90%; Martin: 40–50%; 50–60%; 60–70%; 70–80%; 80–90%; >90%; Tie: 40–50%; 50%; No Votes

Republican primary results
Party	Candidate	Votes	%
Republican	David Varnam	239,042	55.48
Republican	Will Martin	190,811	44.28
Write-in		1,033	0.24
Total votes		430,886	100.0

== General election ==
=== Predictions ===
Source	Ranking	As of
The Cook Political Report	Lean D	October 29, 2026
Decision Desk HQ	Lean D	November 3, 2026
Fox News	Tossup	November 1, 2026
Inside Elections	Tilt D	October 29, 2026
NBC News	Lean D	November 3, 2026
RealClearPolitics	Tossup	November 1, 2026
Sabato's Crystal Ball	Lean D	November 2, 2026
Silver Bulletin	Likely D	November 3, 2026

=== Post-primary endorsements ===
David Crowley (D)

Executive branch officials

- Kamala Harris, former vice president of the United States (2021–2025)
- Barack Obama, former president of the United States (2009–2017)
- Eric Holder, former United States attorney general (2009–2015)

U.S. senators

- Tammy Baldwin, Wisconsin (2013–present)

Statewide officials

- Wes Moore, governor of Maryland (2023–present)

State legislators

- Francesca Hong, AD-76 (2021–present) and primary candidate for governor in 2026

Labor unions

- AFSCME Council 32
- AFT-Wisconsin
- Service Employees International Union Wisconsin
- United Auto Workers
- Wisconsin AFL-CIO

Organizations

- Democrats for Education Reform
- Everytown for Gun Safety
- Fair Wisconsin
- Faith in Place
- Giffords
- Human Rights Campaign
- National Association of Social Workers (Wisconsin Chapter)
- Our Wisconsin Revolution
- Planned Parenthood
- Reproductive Freedom for All
- Sierra Club Wisconsin Chapter
- Wisconsin Conservation Voters
- Wisconsin Working Families Party

Newspapers

- The Badger Herald
- The Capital Times
- Milwaukee Courier
- The Shepherd Express
- Wisconsin State Journal
Tom Tiffany (R)

U.S. senators

- Ron Johnson, Wisconsin (2011–present)

U.S. representatives

- Brandon Gill, TX-26 (2025–present)

Statewide officials

- Scott Walker, former governor of Wisconsin (2011–2019)
- Glenn Youngkin, former governor of Virginia (2022–2026)

Individuals

- Brett Favre, football player
- Jenny Beth Martin, political activist
- Ted Nugent, rock musician

Organizations

- Wisconsin Right to Life
- Wisconsin Fraternal Order of Police

=== Polling ===
Aggregate polls

Source of poll aggregation	Dates administered	Dates updated	David Crowley (D)	Tom Tiffany (R)	Other/Undecided	Margin
270toWin	September 28 – October 22, 2026	October 28, 2026	48.7%	43.3%	8.0%	Crowley +5.4%
Decision Desk HQ	through October 23, 2026	October 28, 2026	47.4%	43.7%	8.9%	Crowley +3.7%
FiftyPlusOne	through October 23, 2026	October 28, 2026	48.9%	44.4%	6.7%	Crowley +4.5%
RealClearPolitics	August 12 – October 22, 2026	October 28, 2026	48.7%	43.7%	7.6%	Crowley +5.0%
Silver Bulletin	through October 9, 2026	October 28, 2026	48.9%	44.5%	6.6%	Crowley +4.4%
Average			48.5%	43.9%	7.6%	Crowley +4.6%

Poll source	Date(s) administered	Sample size	Margin of error	David Crowley (D)	Tom Tiffany (R)	Other	Undecided
Research Co.	October 30 – November 1, 2026	450 (LV)	± 4.6%	50%	45%	—	5%
Wick (R)	October 19–23, 2026	1,213 (LV)	± 3.0%	48%	45%	—	8%
Marquette University	October 14–22, 2026	668 (LV)	± 4.7%	51%	44%	—	4%
Marquette University	October 14–22, 2026	818 (RV)	± 4.3%	47%	44%	—	9%
YouGov (D) (Note: Poll sponsored by City Forward Collective and CFC Action Fund, which supports Democrats)	September 22 – October 9, 2026	1,715 (A)	—	46%	42%	—	9%
Z to A Research (D) (Note: Poll sponsored by Rust Belt Rising, which supports Democrats)	September 28 – October 1, 2026	662 (LV)	—	49%	44%	—	5%
Marquette University	September 16–23, 2026	692 (LV)	± 4.8%	49%	46%	—	5%
Marquette University	September 16–23, 2026	843 (RV)	± 4.3%	46%	45%	—	9%
Marquette University	August 12–20, 2026	738 (LV)	± 4.5%	49%	44%	—	7%
Marquette University	August 12–20, 2026	891 (RV)	± 4.0%	44%	44%	—	12%
TIPP Insights (R)	August 14–18, 2026	1,199 (LV)	± 3.1%	47%	43%	4% (Note: "Someone else" with 4%)	6%
TIPP Insights (R)	August 14–18, 2026	1,434 (RV)	± 2.9%	43%	41%	5% (Note: "Someone else" with 5%)	10%
Platform Communications (R)	August 12–13, 2026	500 (LV)	± 4.4%	48%	44%	—	—
	August 11, 2026	Primary elections					
GBAO (D) (Note: Poll sponsored by Protect Our Wisconsin PAC, a group backed by the Democratic Governors Association.)	July 30 – August 3, 2026	800 (LV)	± 3.5%	47%	44%	—	5%
RMG Research	July 20–24, 2026	800 (RV)	± 3.5%	46%	43%	—	11%
TIPP Insights (R)	March 13–19, 2026	1,175 (LV)	± 2.9%	42%	41%	5%	12%
TIPP Insights (R)	March 13–19, 2026	1,495 (RV)	± 2.7%	39%	38%	6% (Note: "Someone else" with 6%)	17%

Hypothetical polling

Joel Brennan vs. Tom Tiffany

Poll source	Date(s) administered	Sample size	Margin of error	Joel Brennan (D)	Tom Tiffany (R)	Other	Undecided
Marquette University	July 8–16, 2026	695 (LV)	± 4.9%	43%	44%	—	13%
Marquette University	July 8–16, 2026	838 (RV)	± 4.5%	39%	42%	—	19%

Francesca Hong vs. Tom Tiffany

Poll source	Date(s) administered	Sample size	Margin of error	Francesca Hong (D)	Tom Tiffany (R)	Other	Undecided
RMG Research	July 20–24, 2026	800 (RV)	± 3.5%	44%	43%	—	13%
Marquette University	July 8–16, 2026	695 (LV)	± 4.9%	44%	44%	—	12%
Marquette University	July 8–16, 2026	838 (RV)	± 4.5%	40%	43%	—	17%
TIPP Insights (R)	March 13–19, 2026	1,175 (LV)	± 2.9%	40%	43%	6%	12%
TIPP Insights (R)	March 13–19, 2026	1,495 (RV)	± 2.7%	37%	40%	7% (Note: "Someone else" with 7%)	16%
Patriot Polling (R)	March 10–16, 2026	812 (LV)	± 3.5%	42%	46%	12%	

Kelda Roys vs. Tom Tiffany

Poll source	Date(s) administered	Sample size	Margin of error	Kelda Roys (D)	Tom Tiffany (R)	Other	Undecided
Marquette University	July 8–16, 2026	695 (LV)	± 4.9%	42%	44%	—	14%
Marquette University	July 8–16, 2026	838 (RV)	± 4.5%	38%	42%	—	21%

Mandela Barnes vs. Tim Michels

Poll source	Date(s) administered	Sample size	Margin of error	Mandela Barnes (D)	Tim Michels (R)	Undecided
Impact Research (D) (Note: Poll sponsored by The Long Run PAC, an organization founded by Barnes)	October 2–8, 2025	500 (LV)	± 4.4%	51%	44%	5%

Mandela Barnes vs. Tom Tiffany

Poll source	Date(s) administered	Sample size	Margin of error	Mandela Barnes (D)	Tom Tiffany (R)	Other	Undecided
RMG Research	July 20–24, 2026	800 (RV)	± 3.5%	47%	42%	—	11%
Marquette University	July 8–16, 2026	695 (LV)	± 4.9%	47%	42%	—	11%
Marquette University	July 8–16, 2026	838 (RV)	± 4.5%	44%	40%	—	16%
TIPP Insights (R)	March 13–19, 2026	1,175 (LV)	± 2.9%	43%	41%	6%	10%
TIPP Insights (R)	March 13–19, 2026	1,495 (RV)	± 2.7%	40%	38%	7%	15%
Impact Research (D)	October 2–8, 2025	500 (LV)	± 4.4%	50%	44%	—	7%

Sara Rodriguez vs. Tom Tiffany

Poll source	Date(s) administered	Sample size	Margin of error	Sara Rodriguez (D)	Tom Tiffany (R)	Other	Undecided
Marquette University	July 8–16, 2026	838 (RV)	± 4.5%	42%	41%	—	17%
TIPP Insights (R)	March 13–19, 2026	1,175 (LV)	± 2.9%	44%	41%	5%	10%
TIPP Insights (R)	March 13–19, 2026	1,495 (RV)	± 2.7%	40%	39%	7%	15%

Generic Democrat vs. generic Republican

Poll source	Date(s) administered	Sample size	Margin of error	Generic Democrat	Generic Republican	Undecided
Platform Communications	September 28–30, 2025	500 (LV)	—	40%	43%	17%

=== Debate ===
2026 Wisconsin gubernatorial election debate
No.	Date	Host	Moderators	Link	Participants	
P Participant A Absent N Non-invitee I Invitee W Withdrawn						
P Participant A Absent N Non-invitee I Invitee W Withdrawn					David Crowley	Tom Tiffany
1	October 21, 2026	WISN-TV; WisPolitics; Marquette University Law School	Matt Smith; Gerron Jordan		P	P

=== Results ===
2026 Wisconsin gubernatorial election
Party	Candidate	Votes	%	±%
Democratic	David Crowley; Sarah Godlewski	1,440,993	54.00	
Republican	Tom Tiffany; David Varnam	1,227,676	46.00	
Write-in				
Total votes		2,668,669	100.0	

Counties that flipped from Republican to Democratic

- Brown (largest municipality: Green Bay)
- Kenosha (largest municipality: Kenosha)
- Racine (largest municipality: Racine)
- Winnebago (largest municipality: Oshkosh)

== Analysis ==
=== Exit poll ===
2026 Wisconsin gubernatorial election (CNN)
Demographic subgroup	Crowley	Tiffany	% of total vote
Ideology
Liberals	98	2	29
Moderates	65	35	35
Conservatives	8	92	36
Party
Democrats	98	2	31
Republicans	6	94	34
Independents	61	38	34
Donald Trump job approval
Approve	4	96	37
Disapprove	84	15	61
2024 presidential vote
Kamala Harris	97	3	48
Donald Trump	7	92	45
Another candidate	62	33	2
Did not vote	65	35	3
Gender
Men	48	52	48
Women	58	41	51
Income
$100,000 or more	52	48	41
$50,000-$99,999	52	47	36
Less than $50,000	60	39	22
Race/ethnicity
White	51	48	88
Latino	65	34	4
All other voters	67	32	6
White born-again or evangelical Christian?
Yes	17	83	18
No	62	38	82
White voters by gender
White men	46	54	42
White women	56	44	45
Age
18–29 years old	72	28	13
30–44 years old	63	36	21
45-64 years old	46	53	34
65 and older	48	52	31
Area type
Urban	70	29	19
Suburban	57	41	31
Rural	43	57	50
Education
College graduate	64	36	41
No college degree	47	53	59
Education by race
White college graduates	63	36	36
Non-white college graduates	70	30	5
Whites without college	43	56	52
Non-whites without college	73	26	8
Education by gender and race
White women with college degrees	66	34	19
White women without college degrees	48	52	25
White men with college degrees	60	40	16
White men without college degrees	37	63	26
Voters of color	73	26	13
Educational attainment
Advanced degree	70	30	15
Bachelor's degree	61	39	26
Associate's degree	46	53	15
Some college	52	47	19
Never attended college	42	57	26

== See also ==
- 2026 United States gubernatorial elections
- 2026 Wisconsin elections

== Notes ==
Partisan clients
