= Sara Rodriguez =

Lieutanant Governor of Wisconsin since 2023

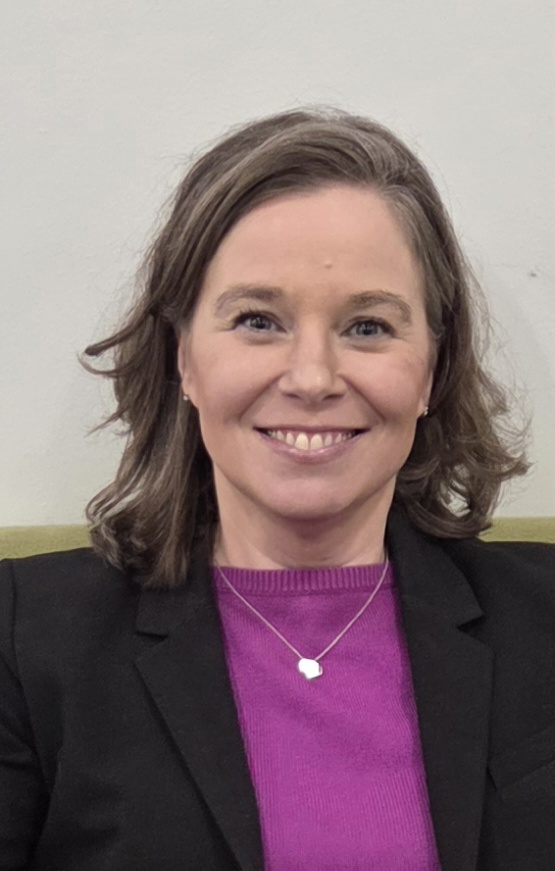
- Rodriguez in 2026

46th Lieutenant Governor of Wisconsin
- Incumbent
- Assumed office January 3, 2023
- Governor: Tony Evers
- Preceded by: Mandela Barnes

Member of the Wisconsin State Assembly from the 13th district
- In office January 4, 2021 – January 3, 2023
- Preceded by: Rob Hutton
- Succeeded by: Tom Michalski

Personal details
- Born: Sara Janelle Russell; July 25, 1975 (age 51) Milwaukee, Wisconsin, U.S.
- Party: Democratic
- Spouse: Baltazar Rodriguez
- Children: 2
- Education: Illinois Wesleyan University (BA); Johns Hopkins University (BS, MS, MPH)
- Website: Campaign website

Sara Janelle Rodriguez (née Russell; born July 25, 1975) is an American politician and former health care professional serving since 2023 as the 46th lieutenant governor of Wisconsin. A member of the Democratic Party, she previously represented Wisconsin's 13th Assembly district from 2021 to 2023. She was a Democratic candidate for governor of Wisconsin in the 2026 election, but withdrew from the race before the primary election.

== Early life and education ==
Rodriguez was born on July 25, 1975, in Milwaukee, Wisconsin, and raised in the nearby suburb of Brookfield. She graduated from Brookfield East High School and earned a bachelor's degree in neuroscience from Illinois Wesleyan University. After college, she joined the Peace Corps and served for two years in Samoa, where she also volunteered with the World Health Organization. After returning to the United States, Rodriguez attended Johns Hopkins University, earning a bachelor's degree in nursing and master's degrees in public health and nursing.

== Healthcare career ==
Rodriguez worked for two years as a registered nurse in the emergency department at the Mercy Medical Center in Baltimore, then went to work for the Centers for Disease Control and Prevention in their Epidemic Intelligence Service from 2004 to 2006.

In 2006 she moved to Colorado and worked as associate director of nursing at the Tri-County Health Department, serving Adams, Arapahoe, and Douglas counties. In 2009 she was appointed Chronic Disease Branch Director in the Colorado Department of Public Health and Environment, under Governor Bill Ritter.

In 2011, she returned to Wisconsin and was employed as Vice President of Clinical and Analytical Services at The Benefit Services Group, Inc., until 2014. She then worked three years as Vice President of Clinical Services at Honeywell Life Care Solutions. From 2017 until her campaign for the Assembly in 2020, she was vice president for Population Health and Integrated Care Management at Advocate Aurora Health.

== Political career ==
=== Wisconsin State Assembly (2021–2023) ===
In 2020, Rodriguez declared her candidacy for Wisconsin State Assembly in the 13th assembly district, challenging incumbent Republican Rob Hutton. Hutton was first elected after the Republican redistricting in 2012, which made the 13th district significantly more Republican—Hutton carried the district with 60% of the vote in 2012 and was unopposed in 2014 and 2016. Despite the redistricting plan, the 13th district, like several other suburban districts, had moved back toward Democrats during Trump's presidency. Hutton was in his fourth term in 2020 and had won reelection in 2018 by a margin of just 955 votes. At the time of the 2020 election, the 13th district comprised the southern half of the city and town of Brookfield, all of the village of Elm Grove, the southern half of Wauwatosa, and parts of Milwaukee and West Allis.

Rodriguez said she was inspired to run by Republican inaction around the 2020 spring election, which occurred during the first wave of the COVID-19 pandemic in Wisconsin. She said, "when the Republican-led Legislature made people choose between their health and right to vote in the spring election, I just felt my background in health care and epidemiology would be helpful." Rodriguez prevailed in the November general election, winning the seat by 735 votes. She was one of only two candidates in Wisconsin to defeat an incumbent in the 2020 general election.

=== Lieutenant Governor of Wisconsin (2023–present) ===
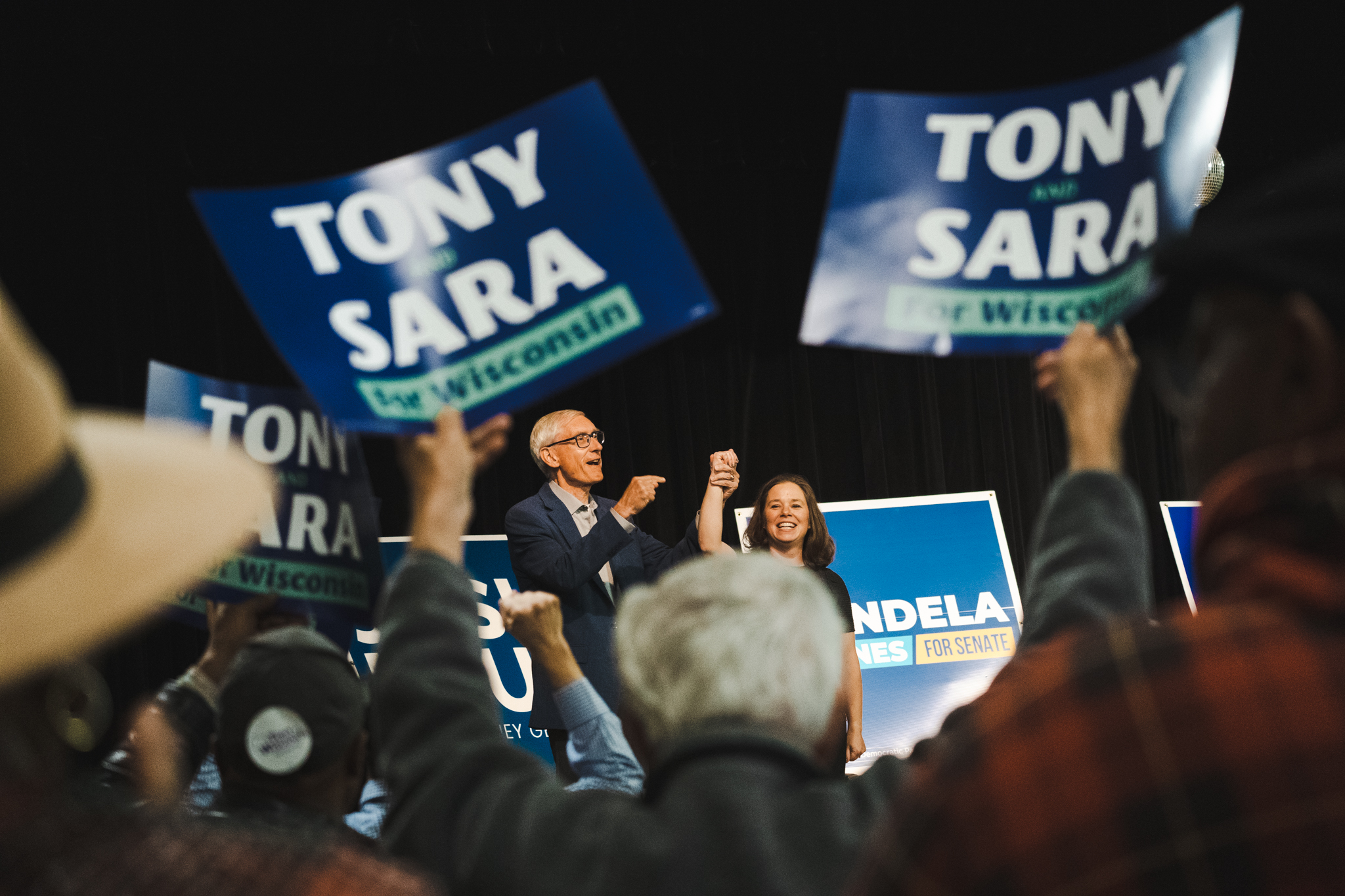
Rodriguez with Governor Tony Evers at a campaign rally, 2022

In July 2021, Wisconsin Lieutenant Governor Mandela Barnes announced he would run for U.S. Senate in 2022 rather than running for another term as lieutenant governor. That fall, Rodriguez announced that she would run for lieutenant governor in 2022, highlighting her experience as a public health professional and small business owner, and her perspective as a political outsider. Initially, it appeared that she would face State Senator Lena Taylor in the Democratic primary, but Taylor withdrew from the race before the end of the year. Instead, Rodriguez faced Peng Her, a leader of the Wisconsin Hmong community making his third bid for elected office. Rodriguez secured significant support from Democratic lawmakers and organizations, and won the primary with 76% of the vote. By winning the primary, Rodriguez joined the ticket led by incumbent governor Tony Evers; she campaigned for Evers around the state. Evers and Rodriguez won the general election, defeating Republican nominees Tim Michels and Roger Roth. Rodriguez was sworn in as lieutenant governor on January 3, 2023, taking her oath of office from chief justice Annette Ziegler.

Since becoming lieutenant governor, Rodriguez has campaigned for other Democratic candidates and causes. She also started a Leadership PAC focused on supporting candidates in favor of Medicaid expansion and other healthcare causes. She was a delegate to the 2024 Democratic National Convention and had a speaking slot on the convention's first day.

As lieutenant governor, Rodriguez chairs the Wisconsin Interagency Council on Homelessness, where she coordinates several agencies' efforts related to homelessness. She is also chair of the Governor's Task Force on Healthcare Workforce, which advises the governor on how to grow the state's healthcare workforce.

=== 2026 Wisconsin gubernatorial campaign ===
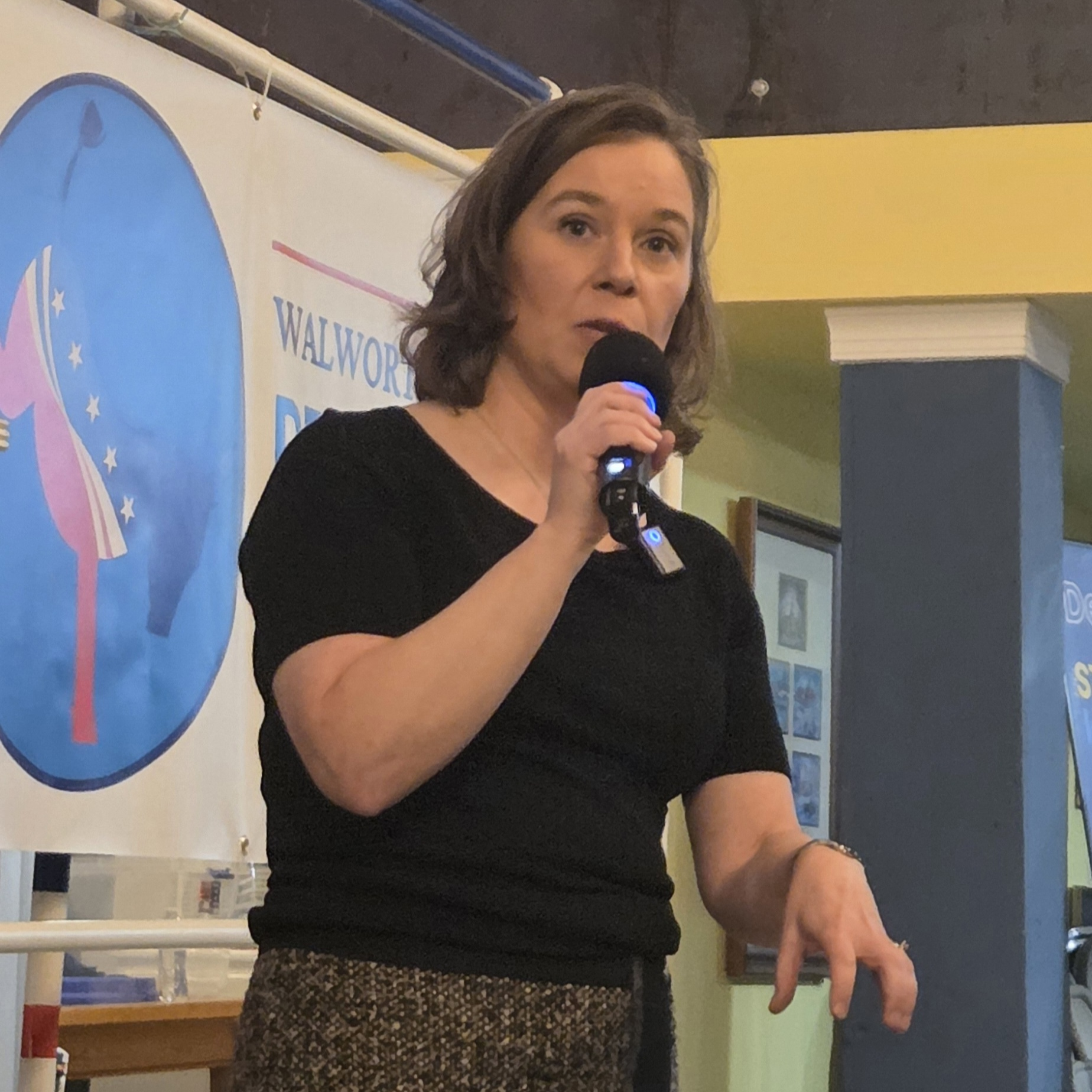
Rodriguez talking to potential voters during her 2026 gubernatorial campaign

In 2024 and 2025, the Wisconsin political class began speculating about whether Governor Tony Evers—then in his early 70s—would run for a third term; Rodriguez was described as a likely candidate for governor if Evers declined to run. Evers formally announced on July 24, 2025, that he would not run for re-election in the 2026 election. Rodriguez launched her campaign the next day, reiterating her goal of passing Medicaid expansion in Wisconsin.

She faced a competitive primary field, including former lieutenant governor Mandela Barnes, Madison state senator Kelda Roys, Milwaukee County executive David Crowley, Madison state representative Francesca Hong, former secretary of the Wisconsin Department of Administration Joel Brennan, and former CEO of the Wisconsin Economic Development Corporation Missy Hughes.

During the Democratic primary, Rodriguez claimed that she would have been the strongest general election candidate. At an April 2026 event, she expressed concerns about the electability of Mandela Barnes, citing his loss in the 2022 United States Senate election in Wisconsin, and of Francesca Hong, referencing a poll showing her behind Republican candidate Tom Tiffany in a hypothetical general election matchup. Rodriguez also pointed to her own electoral victories, including wins in Waukesha County and statewide. Barnes's campaign replied with polls that showed him leading Tiffany. Hong responded by noting that her predecessor in the Assembly, Chris Taylor, had just won a statewide race by 20 points, and said that the state is "ready" for her policy agenda.

In mid-June 2026, Rodriguez led the Wisconsin Democratic Party straw poll at the state party convention. A week later, Missy Hughes withdrew from the race and endorsed Rodriguez. Another opponent, Milwaukee County executive David Crowley, withdrew on July 9 and endorsed Rodriguez.

Despite her consolidating support, Rodriguez's campaign struggled internally. In early July, Rodriguez learned of serious financial problems in her campaign after a planned advertising blitz failed to deploy due to lacking funds. She fired her campaign manager on July 12 due to "serious mismanagement and inaccuracies" in campaign finance reports. The Milwaukee Journal Sentinel had already identified that the campaign may have overstated its fundraising in its January 2026 report by more than $100,000. Rodriguez posted only $35,000 cash on hand in her July campaign finance report, but immediately sought to make amendments to the report. Ultimately, on July 17, she dropped out of the gubernatorial race, stating that the campaign's financial reporting issues would become an ongoing distraction if the campaign continued.

== Personal life and family ==
Rodriguez is married with two children and resides in Waukesha, Wisconsin. Her husband is an IT network engineer named Baltazar Rodriguez, who is originally from Mexico. They met at a salsa dancing class in Oklahoma.

Rodriguez enjoys hiking Wisconsin's Ice Age Trail. She enjoys archery and is a former softball player.

== Electoral history ==
=== Wisconsin Assembly (2020) ===
Year	Election	Date	Elected				Defeated				Total	Plurality
2020	General	Nov. 3	Sara Rodriguez	Democratic	19,318	50.93%	Rob Hutton (inc)	Rep.	18,583	49.00%	37,928	735

=== Wisconsin Lieutenant Governor (2022) ===
Year	Election	Date	Elected				Defeated				Total	Plurality
2022	Primary	Aug. 9	Sara Rodriguez	Democratic	354,260	76.41%	Peng Her	Dem.	108,766	23.46%	463,654	245,494
2022	Primary	Aug. 9	Sara Rodriguez	Democratic	354,260	76.41%	Angela Kennedy (write-in)	Dem.	39	0.01%	463,654	245,494
2022	General	Nov. 8	Tony Evers (inc); Sara Rodriguez	Democratic	1,358,774	51.15%	Tim Michels; Roger Roth	Rep.	1,268,535	47.75%	2,656,490	90,239
2022	General	Nov. 8	Tony Evers (inc); Sara Rodriguez	Democratic	1,358,774	51.15%	Joan Ellis Beglinger (withdrawn); N/A	Ind.	27,198	1.02%	2,656,490	90,239
2022	General	Nov. 8	Tony Evers (inc); Sara Rodriguez	Democratic	1,358,774	51.15%	Seth Haskin; N/A	Ind.	104	0.00%	2,656,490	90,239

=== Wisconsin Governor (2026) ===
Year	Election	Date	Elected				Defeated				Total	Plurality
2026	Primary	Aug. 11	David Crowley	Democratic	315,413	39.81%	Francesca Hong	Dem.	311,740	39.35%	792,290	3,673
2026	Primary	Aug. 11	David Crowley	Democratic	315,413	39.81%	Kelda Roys	Dem.	59,394	7.50%	792,290	3,673
2026	Primary	Aug. 11	David Crowley	Democratic	315,413	39.81%	Joel Brennan	Dem.	37,084	4.68%	792,290	3,673
2026	Primary	Aug. 11	David Crowley	Democratic	315,413	39.81%	Sara Rodriguez (withdrawn)	Dem.	32,674	4.12%	792,290	3,673
2026	Primary	Aug. 11	David Crowley	Democratic	315,413	39.81%	Mandela Barnes (withdrawn)	Dem.	32,435	4.09%	792,290	3,673
2026	Primary	Aug. 11	David Crowley	Democratic	315,413	39.81%	Missy Hughes (withdrawn)	Dem.	3,230	0.41%	792,290	3,673
2026	Primary	Aug. 11	David Crowley	Democratic	315,413	39.81%	Brett Hulsey (write-in; withdrawn)	Dem.	13	0.00%	792,290	3,673
2026	Primary	Aug. 11	David Crowley	Democratic	315,413	39.81%	Tim Reppen (write-in)	Dem.	10	0.00%	792,290	3,673

== See also ==
- List of female lieutenant governors in the United States

Party political offices
Preceded by Mandela Barnes	Democratic nominee for Lieutenant Governor of Wisconsin; 2022	Succeeded by Sarah Godlewski
Political offices
Preceded by Mandela Barnes	Lieutenant Governor of Wisconsin; 2023–present	Incumbent
