= Francesca Hong =

American chef and politician (born 1988)

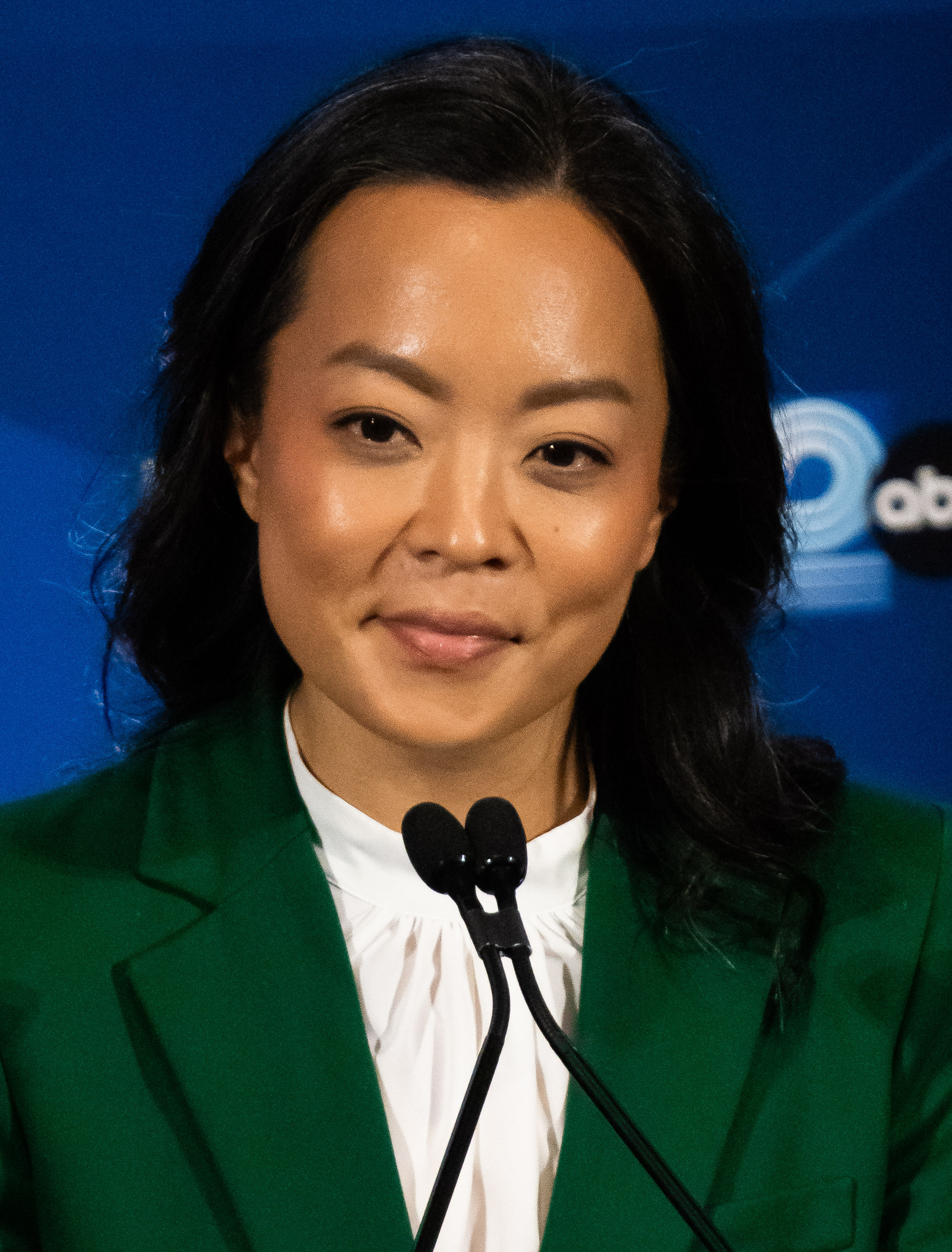
- Hong in 2026

Member of the Wisconsin State Assembly from the 76th district
- Incumbent
- Assumed office January 4, 2021
- Preceded by: Chris Taylor

Personal details
- Born: November 4, 1988 (age 37) Madison, Wisconsin, U.S.
- Party: Democratic
- Other political affiliations: Democratic Socialists of America
- Spouse: Matt Morris (divorced)
- Children: 1
- Website: State Assembly website; Campaign website

Korean name
- Hangul: 홍윤정
- RR: Hong Yunjeong
- MR: Hong Yunjŏng

Francesca Hong (born November 4, 1988) is an American politician, former chef, and business owner who has represented Wisconsin's 76th Assembly district in the Wisconsin State Assembly since 2021. She is a member of the Democratic Party and the Democratic Socialists of America (DSA). Hong's district includes the downtown and east side of the state capital, Madison, as well as Maple Bluff.

Hong is the first Asian-American member of the Wisconsin Legislature and formed the first Asian Caucus in the State Assembly in 2025; she is also a member of the Assembly Socialist Caucus. Hong was an unsuccessful candidate for governor of Wisconsin in 2026, narrowly losing the Democratic primary to Milwaukee County executive David Crowley in an upset.

== Early life and culinary career ==
Francesca Hong was born on November 4, 1988, in Madison, Wisconsin, to Korean-American immigrant parents. As a child, she attended public schools in Madison, graduating from Madison West High School in 2007. Hong played soccer growing up and played for West High. Hong then attended the University of Wisconsin–Madison, where she studied Spanish and journalism, hoping to become a sports journalist.

Hong dropped out in 2009 to work a full-time job, starting as a dishwasher and later becoming a line cook and sous chef. In 2011, she became executive chef of the American bistro 43 North in Madison, which closed in 2016. In 2016, Hong and her then-husband, Matt Morris, opened Morris Ramen in Madison. The restaurant closed in 2024. Also in 2016, Hong helped found the Culinary Ladies Collective, alongside fellow business owners Tami Lax and Laila Borokhim.

== Wisconsin State Assembly (2021–present) ==
=== Elections ===
In March 2020, incumbent state representative Chris Taylor announced she would not run for reelection to the Wisconsin State Assembly that year, creating an open seat in the heavily Democratic 76th Assembly district. Hong, who at the time did not reside in the district, announced that she would run to succeed Taylor in the 2020 election. Hong ran a progressive campaign, opposing the Madison police union and supporting allowing culinary workers to organize into unions, while also emphasizing her business experience as a chef and restaurant owner. She won the seven-person primary with 28% of the vote, a six-point margin over the second-place finisher, Madison police officer Tyrone Cratic Williams.

Hong defeated Republican Patrick Hull in the general election by a 77-point margin and was sworn in on January 4, 2021. She became the first Asian American state legislator in Wisconsin history. In 2022, Hong was reelected unopposed. In May 2024, Hong was endorsed by the Madison Area chapter of Democratic Socialists of America. In the 2024 elections, Hong was again reelected unopposed.

=== Tenure ===
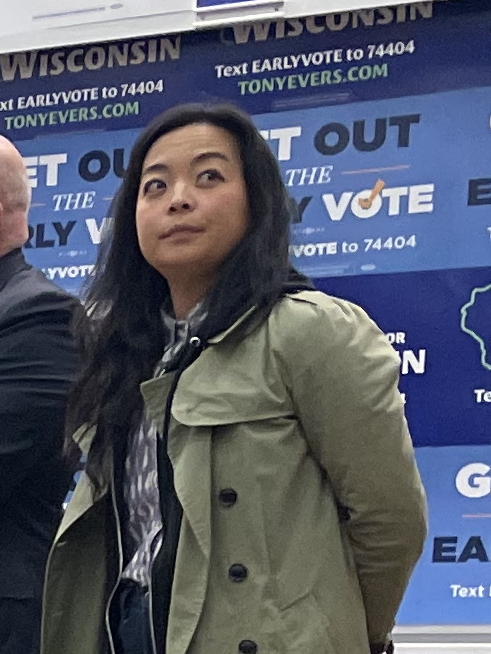
Hong during a rally in October 2022

During her first term in the legislature, Hong sponsored efforts to raise the tipped minimum wage and introduced a bill to establish an Economic Bill of Rights in Wisconsin. A supporter of environmental rights, she was among ten people to sign up for a "dunk tank" fund-raiser in Madison on August 1, 2021, to raise awareness about the importance of clean water. After her 2022 reelection, Hong was appointed to the Wisconsin Economic Development Corporation (WEDC) board of directors, to the seat controlled by the Assembly minority leader, Greta Neubauer.

In February 2024, Hong backed reforms to implement paid family leave in the state. As the state's first Asian American legislator, she was among those who introduced legislation to require that Wisconsin public schools teach Asian American and Hmong American history. She said increased anti-Asian hate during the COVID-19 pandemic and the emergence of Asian voting blocs motivated her colleagues in the Assembly to support the change to the law. Governor Tony Evers signed the bill into law in April 2024. During the 2024 Democratic Party presidential primaries, Hong backed the Uncommitted National Movement to protest President Joe Biden's policies in the Gaza war, and drafted a letter calling for a ceasefire in Gaza. Hong also joined the State Assembly's Socialist Caucus in 2024.

In March 2025, Hong supported the Climate Accountability Act, which aimed to cut greenhouse gas emissions by half by 2030 and reach net-zero carbon emissions by 2050. She also co-sponsored a bill establishing an Economic Bill of Rights in the state, which she had previously introduced in the 2021–2022 and 2023–2024 legislative sessions. In May 2025, Hong formed the first Asian Caucus in the State Assembly with freshman representatives Angelito Tenorio and Renuka Mayadev. In July, Hong voted against the 2025–2027 state budget, which had been created through negotiations between governor Evers and legislative leadership from both parties, arguing it "let Republicans off the hook while leaving communities without the investment or care they deserve."

In February 2026, Hong co-drafted a bill that would put a statewide moratorium on data centers. Later that month, she also introduced legislation to repeal a Wisconsin statute that banned boycotts of Israel by companies and individuals doing business with state government.

== 2026 Wisconsin gubernatorial campaign ==
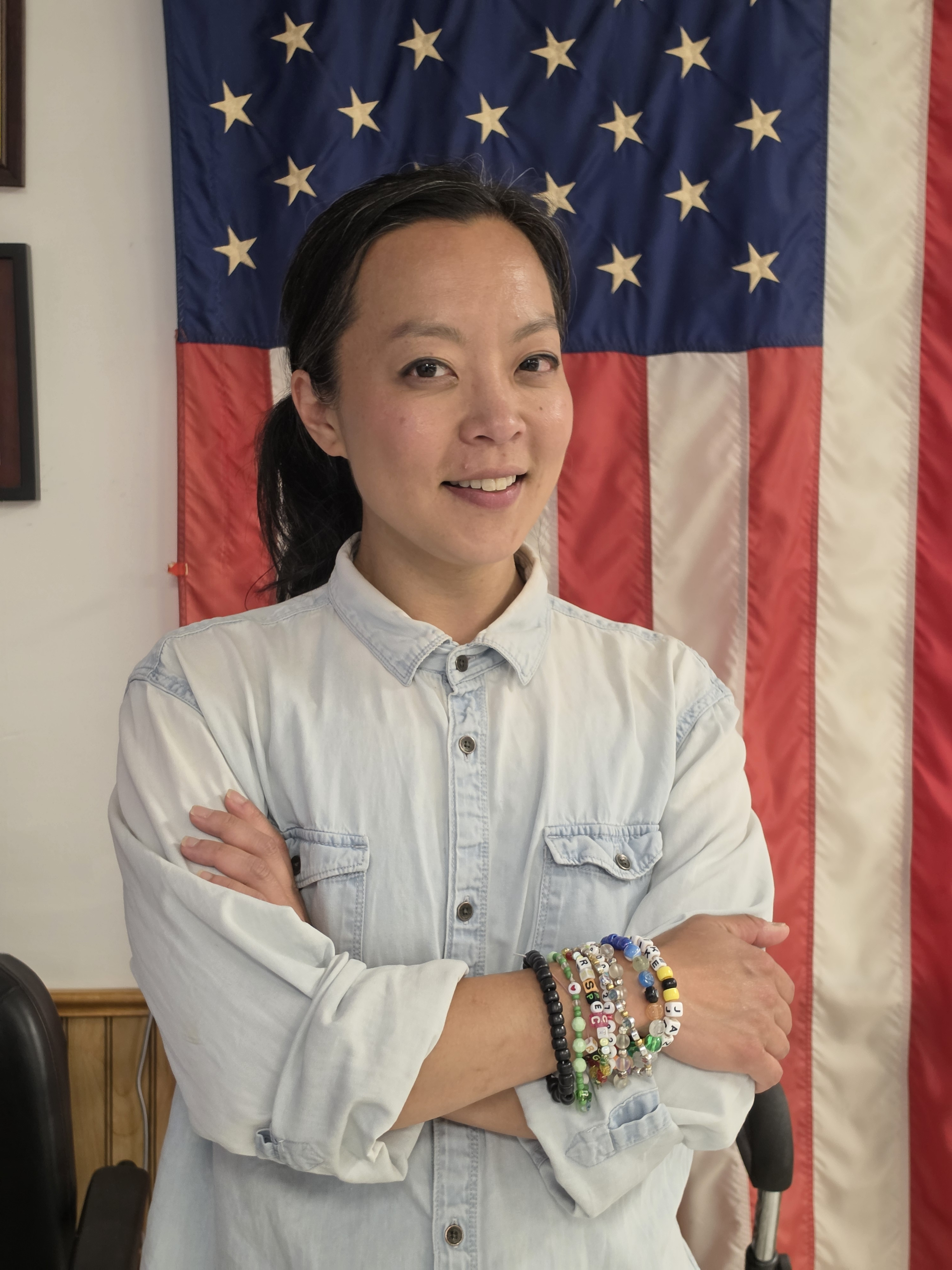
Hong in June 2026

After incumbent governor Tony Evers announced he would not run for a third term in the 2026 Wisconsin gubernatorial election, Hong expressed interest in seeking the Democratic nomination to succeed him. She formally launched her campaign for governor on September 17, 2025, making comparisons to Rosie the Riveter, calling to fund public education and universal childcare, and vowing not to take corporate PAC campaign donations. By the end of 2025, the Democratic primary field included incumbent lieutenant governor Sara Rodriguez, former lieutenant governor Mandela Barnes, Milwaukee County executive David Crowley, Madison state senator Kelda Roys, former secretary of the Wisconsin Department of Administration Joel Brennan, and Missy Hughes, the former CEO of the Wisconsin Economic Development Corporation.

Hong was the only democratic socialist in the crowded primary field, and she used a similar media strategy and messaging to that of Zohran Mamdani, the democratic socialist who had recently been elected mayor of New York City. In September, during a campaign stop in Green Bay, Wisconsin, Hong proposed the creation of a public bank in the state, modeled on the Bank of North Dakota. The proposed bank would provide affordable loans to small farms, butcheries, and bakeries; according to Hong, it would also promote competition and make goods more affordable. Hong also advocated for repealing Wisconsin's right-to-work law, reversing former governor Scott Walker's law denying public employee unions bargaining rights (2011 Wisconsin Act 10), and allowing union members to deduct their union dues from their income tax. In January 2026, Hong's campaign issued a press release calling for a moratorium on the construction of new AI data centers in the state; data centers had become a hot-button issue in many Wisconsin communities, and Hong's moratorium became a signature issue of her campaign.

After a year of campaigning, the race began to consolidate in June 2026 after the Democratic Party of Wisconsin state convention, in which Rodriguez won the informal straw poll. Hughes and Crowley withdrew from the race and endorsed Rodriguez. But in July, Rodriguez fired her campaign manager and announced significant errors in campaign finance reports, and on July 17, she withdrew from the race. Crowley reentered the race on July 18, whereupon Governor Evers ended his neutrality in the race and endorsed Crowley. Hong continued to rise in the polls in July, with several polls showing her in the lead; after Rodriguez's departure, many journalists and analysts began to call Hong the front-runner. Barnes ended his campaign on July 30 and acknowledged Hong would likely win the nomination.

At a debate with other Democratic candidates, Hong said she would not sign a bill that reduced police funding despite previous support for reducing police funding. Less than a week earlier, Hong used the word "execution" to describe the fatal shooting of a man in Madison. At the debate, Hong said she would not use that kind of language as governor because of the "deep responsibility" of having "the largest microphone in the state". During this time, Hong also came under increased scrutiny for her past statements, with interviewers asking her about comments about "whiteness", "cancel Thanksgiving", "defund the police", and "abolish the Senate". She attempted to distance herself from the past comments and to put them in context, but the interviews resulted in a national media spectacle.

Hong lost the August 11 primary to Crowley by a margin of 0.5%. The next day, she endorsed Crowley and said she would work to help him win the general election. In the aftermath of the vote, writers for Politico and Time opined that other Democrats sought to distance the party from the "far-left" politics of Hong and the DSA.

== Personal life ==
Hong lives in Madison, Wisconsin, with her son. She works part-time as a bartender. She was previously married to Matt Morris, with whom she opened Morris Ramen. In a 2023 interview, Hong said that she experienced a mental health crisis at age 18, was hospitalized for a week, and was diagnosed with bipolar disorder. Hong is a supporter of the Milwaukee Bucks and Forward Madison FC. In 2021, she got a tattoo featuring the popular slogan "Bucks in Six" after the team's 2021 NBA championship. Hong serves as volunteer Board Vice President of the Madison-area not-for-profit "Rooted", which builds sustainable local food systems through production, land access, and urban agriculture education.

== Electoral history ==
=== Wisconsin Assembly (2020–2024) ===
Year	Election	Date	Elected				Defeated				Total	Plurality
2020	Primary	Aug. 11	Francesca Hong	Democratic	4,793	28.15%	Tyrone Cratic Williams	Dem.	3,810	22.37%	17,029	983
2020	Primary	Aug. 11	Francesca Hong	Democratic	4,793	28.15%	Marsha A. Rummel	Dem.	2,803	16.46%	17,029	983
2020	Primary	Aug. 11	Francesca Hong	Democratic	4,793	28.15%	Heather Driscoll	Dem.	2,780	16.33%	17,029	983
2020	Primary	Aug. 11	Francesca Hong	Democratic	4,793	28.15%	Nicki Vander Meulen	Dem.	1,586	9.31%	17,029	983
2020	Primary	Aug. 11	Francesca Hong	Democratic	4,793	28.15%	Ali Maresh	Dem.	1,099	6.45%	17,029	983
2020	Primary	Aug. 11	Francesca Hong	Democratic	4,793	28.15%	Dewey Bredeson	Dem.	143	0.84%	17,029	983
2020	General	Nov. 3	Francesca Hong	Democratic	35,731	88.02%	Patrick Hull	Rep.	4,779	11.77%	40,594	30,952
2022	General	Nov. 8	Francesca Hong (inc)	Democratic	27,702	98.39%	Unopposed				28,154	27,250
2024	General	Nov. 5	Francesca Hong (inc)	Democratic	34,311	98.85%	Unopposed				34,709	33,913

=== Wisconsin Governor (2026) ===
Year	Election	Date	Elected				Defeated				Total	Plurality
2026	Primary	Aug. 11	David Crowley	Democratic	315,413	39.81%	Francesca Hong	Dem.	311,740	39.35%	792,290	3,673
2026	Primary	Aug. 11	David Crowley	Democratic	315,413	39.81%	Kelda Roys	Dem.	59,394	7.50%	792,290	3,673
2026	Primary	Aug. 11	David Crowley	Democratic	315,413	39.81%	Joel Brennan	Dem.	37,084	4.68%	792,290	3,673
2026	Primary	Aug. 11	David Crowley	Democratic	315,413	39.81%	Sara Rodriguez (withdrawn)	Dem.	32,674	4.12%	792,290	3,673
2026	Primary	Aug. 11	David Crowley	Democratic	315,413	39.81%	Mandela Barnes (withdrawn)	Dem.	32,435	4.09%	792,290	3,673
2026	Primary	Aug. 11	David Crowley	Democratic	315,413	39.81%	Missy Hughes (withdrawn)	Dem.	3,230	0.41%	792,290	3,673
2026	Primary	Aug. 11	David Crowley	Democratic	315,413	39.81%	Brett Hulsey (write-in; withdrawn)	Dem.	13	0.00%	792,290	3,673
2026	Primary	Aug. 11	David Crowley	Democratic	315,413	39.81%	Tim Reppen (write-in)	Dem.	10	0.00%	792,290	3,673
