= Brett Hulsey =

American politician in Wisconsin (born 1959)

Member of the Wisconsin State Assembly
- In office January 3, 2013 – January 3, 2015
- Preceded by: Mark Pocan
- Succeeded by: Lisa Subeck
- Constituency: 78th district
- In office January 3, 2011 – January 3, 2013
- Preceded by: Spencer Black
- Succeeded by: Terese Berceau
- Constituency: 77th district

Personal details
- Born: April 28, 1959 (age 67) Oklahoma City, Oklahoma, U.S.
- Party: Democratic
- Children: 2
- Education: Middlebury College (BA); University of Oklahoma (MS)
- Website: State Assembly website

Brett Dudley Hulsey (born April 28, 1959) is an American politician who was a member of the Wisconsin State Assembly from 2011 to 2015. A member of the Democratic Party, he ran in the Democratic primary during the 2014 and 2026 Wisconsin gubernatorial elections.

== Early life and career ==
Hulsey was born on April 28, 1959, in Oklahoma City, Oklahoma. He earned a Bachelor of Arts in political economy from Middlebury College in 1982, and a Master of Science in natural science from the University of Oklahoma in 1988.

Hulsey later made his way to Alaska, where he was a AmeriCorps VISTA volunteer. Additionally, he served as a political director for the Clinton-Gore presidential campaign in 1992. He is the owner of an energy and environmental consulting firm.

== Political career ==
Hulsey served as a Dane County supervisor from 1998 to 2011. In 2010, Hulsey faced a campaign from the Dane County police deputies union to defeat him in his bid for re-election. Hulsey's opponents charged him with causing the county budget to falter. Hulsey defeated challenger Greg Hull by a 37-point margin.

=== Wisconsin State Assembly (2011–2015) ===
In May 2010, incumbent Democrat Spencer Black announced his retirement. At the time the district was safely Democratic, encompassing parts of downtown Madison as well as the University of Wisconsin–Madison. Following Black's announcement, Hulsey announced his campaign. Following Hulsey, several candidates jumped into the race, with the two frontrunners being Hulsey and fellow Dane County Supervisor Dianne Hesselbein. Additionally, business owner John Imes, attorney Fred Wade, and former Middleton mayor Doug Zwank announced campaigns for the district. During the campaign Hulsey was criticized for past work with Alliant Energy in building a coal plant in Cassville, Wisconsin. Hulsey defeated Hesselbein by a 14-point margin.

During his campaign, Hulsey ran as a progressive Democrat, supporting policies to fund public schools, create Green jobs and protect the environment. Additionally, Hulsey ran into controversy when he improperly listed certain politicians as having endorsed him when they did not. In the general election, Hulsey faced Green party activist Ben Manski, who also ran as a progressive. During the campaign, Manski questioned Hulsey's progressive credentials by making similar criticisms Hulsey's Democratic primary opponents had made regarding his ties to Alliant Energy. Manski's campaign drew several prominent endorsements, including from The Capital Times, Democrats Peg Lautenschlager, and Ed Garvey, as well as several Madison-area teacher's unions. Hulsey defeated Manske by a 17-point margin. Republican candidate David Redick ran in third place with only 18 percent of the vote.

In 2011, Hulsey was criticized by fellow Democrats after appearing to speak for the assembly Democratic caucus in issuing an official statement opposing 2011 Wisconsin Act 10.

After a redistricting by the Republican-controlled legislature, the 77th Assembly District boundaries were moved to the east. Since fellow Democrat Mark Pocan was running for Tammy Baldwin's Congressional seat, Hulsey ran in the modified 78th Assembly district. After facing minimal opposition in the primary, Hulsey faced Green party activist Jonathan Dedering, who officially ran as an independent. Unlike the 2010 race, Dedering was not expected to run a close race against Hulsey. During the campaign, in August, Hulsey pled no-contest to disorderly conduct after he flipped a 9-year-old boy off of his inner tube while they both were swimming at Lake Mendota. Dedering questioned Hulsey's judgement over the incident, while also criticizing Hulsey for his conduct during the 2011 Wisconsin protests and for other gaffes. Hulsey defeated Dedering by a 51-point margin.

In March 2013, Hulsey was investigated by capitol police after bringing a box-cutter into the capitol and suggesting his aide train in self-defense alongside him. In August, Hulsey faced an investigation that found he had used campaign funds to buy an old Convertible. Additionally, Hulsey had asked capitol police if he could bring a Musket on to the floor of the State Assembly, which he argued was to bring attention to Republican-proposed conceal carry laws. Following his controversies and disagreements with Assembly Democrats, Hulsey suggested he would leave the Democratic caucus and become an independent in June 2013. Despite his speculation this did not come to pass.

In the assembly, Hulsey was succeeded by Dane County Supervisor Lisa Subeck.

=== 2014 Wisconsin gubernatorial campaign ===
In April 2014, Hulsey announced he would be seeking the Democratic nomination for governor of Wisconsin that year. He faced business owner and former state Commerce secretary Mary Burke. Hulsey ran on similar progressive issues that he had run on in 2010 and 2012, including expanding BadgerCare, investing in Green energy, funding public schools, and preserving natural resources. During the course of the campaign, Hulsey was criticized as being a long-shot candidate, and ran into controversy when he planned to attend the 2014 Wisconsin Republican Party convention and distribute Klan hoods to convention-goers. Hulsey justified his plan by calling Governor Scott Walker's agenda racist. Hulsey was defeated by Burke by a 67-point margin.

=== 2026 Wisconsin gubernatorial campaign ===
In September 2025, Hulsey announced his second campaign for governor of Wisconsin. He failed to make the Democratic primary ballot.

== Personal life ==
Hulsey had been married to Mary Kay Hulsey for 19 years before divorcing in 2013. The couple had two children, Tyler and Lea.

== Electoral history ==
=== Wisconsin Assembly, 77th district (2010) ===
Year	Election	Date	Elected				Defeated				Total	Plurality
2010	Primary	Sep. 14	Brett Hulsey	Democratic	2,904	44.17%	Dianne H. Hesselbein	Dem.	1,992	30.30%	6,575	912
2010	Primary	Sep. 14	Brett Hulsey	Democratic	2,904	44.17%	Fred Wade	Dem.	1,125	17.11%	6,575	912
2010	Primary	Sep. 14	Brett Hulsey	Democratic	2,904	44.17%	John Imes	Dem.	347	5.28%	6,575	912
2010	Primary	Sep. 14	Brett Hulsey	Democratic	2,904	44.17%	Douglas C. Zwank	Dem.	205	3.12%	6,575	912
2010	General	Nov. 3	Brett Hulsey	Democratic	12,142	48.62%	Ben Manski	Grn.	7,762	31.08%	24,972	4,652
2010	General	Nov. 3	Brett Hulsey	Democratic	12,142	48.62%	David Redick	Rep.	4,670	18.70%	24,972	4,652
2010	General	Nov. 3	Brett Hulsey	Democratic	12,142	48.62%	David K. Olson	Ind.	373	1.49%	24,972	4,652

=== Wisconsin Assembly, 78th district (2012) ===
Year	Election	Date	Elected				Defeated				Total	Plurality
2012	Primary	Aug. 11	Brett Hulsey	Democratic	5,215	91.16%	Christopher Victor Fisher	Dem.	497	8.69%	5,721	4,718
2012	General	Nov. 6	Brett Hulsey	Democratic	22,853	75.44%	Jonathan Dedering	Ind.	7,323	24.17%	30,294	15,530

=== Wisconsin Governor (2014) ===
Year	Election	Date	Elected				Defeated				Total	Plurality
2014	Primary	Aug. 11	Mary Burke	Democratic	259,926	83.28%	Brett Hulsey	Dem.	51,830	16.61%	312,106	208,096

=== Wisconsin Governor (2026) ===
Year	Election	Date	Elected				Defeated				Total	Plurality
2026	Primary	Aug. 11	David Crowley	Democratic	315,413	39.81%	Francesca Hong	Dem.	311,740	39.35%	792,290	3,673
2026	Primary	Aug. 11	David Crowley	Democratic	315,413	39.81%	Kelda Roys	Dem.	59,394	7.50%	792,290	3,673
2026	Primary	Aug. 11	David Crowley	Democratic	315,413	39.81%	Joel Brennan	Dem.	37,084	4.68%	792,290	3,673
2026	Primary	Aug. 11	David Crowley	Democratic	315,413	39.81%	Sara Rodriguez (withdrawn)	Dem.	32,674	4.12%	792,290	3,673
2026	Primary	Aug. 11	David Crowley	Democratic	315,413	39.81%	Mandela Barnes (withdrawn)	Dem.	32,435	4.09%	792,290	3,673
2026	Primary	Aug. 11	David Crowley	Democratic	315,413	39.81%	Missy Hughes (withdrawn)	Dem.	3,230	0.41%	792,290	3,673
2026	Primary	Aug. 11	David Crowley	Democratic	315,413	39.81%	Brett Hulsey (write-in; withdrawn)	Dem.	13	0.00%	792,290	3,673
2026	Primary	Aug. 11	David Crowley	Democratic	315,413	39.81%	Tim Reppen (write-in)	Dem.	10	0.00%	792,290	3,673
