= Ellen Nowak =

American attorney and politician

17th Secretary of the Wisconsin Department of Administration
- In office March 5, 2018 – January 7, 2019
- Governor: Scott Walker
- Preceded by: Scott Neitzel
- Succeeded by: Joel Brennan

Chair of the Public Service Commission of Wisconsin
- In office March 2015 – February 2018
- Governor: Scott Walker
- Preceded by: Phil Montgomery
- Succeeded by: Lon Roberts

Personal details
- Born: 1971 (age 54–55) Illinois, US
- Education: University of Wisconsin–Milwaukee (BA); Marquette University (JD)
- Profession: Lawyer

Ellen Nowak (born 1971) is an American attorney and politician, serving as a member of the Public Service Commission of Wisconsin since January 2019. This is her third term on the Public Service Commission, having previously served from 2011 to 2018, and having served as chair of the commission from 2015 to 2018. In between her terms on the Public Service Commission, she served one year as secretary of the Wisconsin Department of Administration in the cabinet of Governor Scott Walker, during 2018.

== Biography ==
Originally from Illinois, Nowak graduated from Danville High School in 1989. Nowak earned her bachelor's degree from the University of Wisconsin–Milwaukee, and went on to earn a J.D. from Marquette University Law School. Out of law school, she practiced business litigation at Mallery & Zimmerman S.C. in Milwaukee.

She became involved in politics and was hired as legal counsel and chief of staff to the speaker of the Wisconsin State Assembly, John Gard. She subsequently worked for the nonprofit "School Choice Wisconsin", which advocates for state-funded vouchers to pay private school tuition. From 2009 to 2011, she worked as chief of staff to Waukesha County Executive Dan Vrakas. Nowak practiced business litigation at Mallery & Zimmerman S.C. in Milwaukee from 1998 to 2002, and later worked as the deputy director of School Choice Wisconsin.

In July 2011, Governor Scott Walker appointed Nowak to the Public Service Commission of Wisconsin. In March 2015, she was named chairperson. During her time at the Public Service Commission, Nowak served as the First Vice President of the National Association of Regulatory Utility Commissioners. Nowak also served on the Advisory Council for New Mexico State University's Center for Public Utilities, the Advisory Council to the board of directors for the Electric Power Research Institute and the Advisory Committee for the Critical Consumers Issues Forum.

In the spring of 2016, Nowak was one of 11 candidates named as possible replacements for retiring Wisconsin Supreme Court Justice David Prosser Jr., but she was ultimately not selected by the appointment advisory committee.

In February 2018, Walker announced that he would appoint Nowak to serve as secretary of the Wisconsin Department of Administration. She served nearly a year in that role, but after Walker lost re-election in 2018, her position was set to terminate with the change of administration. Walker then appointed her back to the Public Service Commission, where she could remain for a fixed term of four years. Unlike other notable Walker appointees, Nowak has indicated she will leave office when her term expires on March 1, 2023.

In July 2023 Nowak announced that she was resigning to join the American Transmission Co one of the companies she regulated.

Government offices
Preceded by Phil Montgomery	Chair of the Public Service Commission of Wisconsin; March 2015 – February 2018	Succeeded by Lon Roberts
Preceded by Scott Neitzel	Secretary of the Wisconsin Department of Administration; March 5, 2018 – January 7, 2019	Succeeded by Joel Brennan
