= Missy Hughes =

American politician

CEO of the Wisconsin Economic Development Corporation
- In office October 1, 2019 – September 19, 2025; Acting: October 1, 2019 – September 28, 2021
- Governor: Tony Evers
- Preceded by: Mark Hogan
- Succeeded by: John Miller

Personal details
- Born: Melissa Larkin; 1967 or 1968 (age 57–58)
- Party: Democratic
- Spouse: Tripp Hughes
- Children: 3
- Education: Georgetown University (BA); University of Wyoming (JD)
- Website: Campaign website

Melissa B. "Missy" Hughes (née Larkin; born c.1968) is an American lawyer, public administrator, and former agriculture co-op executive from Vernon County, Wisconsin. She served as the secretary and chief executive officer of the Wisconsin Economic Development Corporation (WEDC) from 2019 until 2025. She was appointed in September 2019 by Governor Tony Evers, and was the first woman to hold that post. She was a candidate in the Democratic Party primary for governor of Wisconsin in the 2026 election.

== Early life and career ==
Missy Hughes was born Melissa Larkin. She was raised and educated in Westchester County, New York, graduating from Rye Country Day School in 1986. She attended Georgetown University, earned her bachelor's degree there in 1990, and went on to obtain her J.D. from the University of Wyoming College of Law.

She began her career as a lawyer in Wyoming, working as an associate at the Cheyenne, Wyoming, offices of the law firm Holland & Hart LLP. In 2004, she moved to Wisconsin and accepted a job as general counsel for Organic Valley, a dairy cooperative. She continued as an executive at the coop for the next seventeen years, taking on the expanded role of chief mission officer.

She was appointed to the board of directors of Global Animal Partnership and is now serving as its interim executive director.

== Political career ==
=== Wisconsin Economic Development Corporation ===
In September 2019, Governor Tony Evers announced that he would nominate Hughes to serve as secretary and C.E.O. of the Wisconsin Economic Development Corporation. Due to procedural foot-dragging by the Republican-dominated legislature, Hughes served in an acting capacity until September 2021, when her nomination was finally confirmed by the Wisconsin Senate. She was the first woman to hold that office.

During her tenure, WEDC took on a prominent role in COVID-19 relief programs, and was responsible for much of the pandemic relief grants distributed to Wisconsin small businesses. By January 2021, the WEDC under Hughes had administered about $240 million in loans to almost 55,000 state small businesses affected by the pandemic, the largest direct-aid program for small businesses in WEDC history.

During Hughes's leadership, the WEDC was part of a consortium that received a regional tech hub designation from the federal government focused on the state’s growing biohealth sector. This designation allowed the Milwaukee and Madison areas to compete for $75 million in federal funding.

The WEDC under Hughes also built a $100 million "Wisconsin Investment Fund", half from federal funds and half from venture capital firms. The fund will invest in biohealth and other industries, only to be used in Wisconsin.

=== 2026 Wisconsin gubernatorial campaign ===
Hughes resigned from the WEDC in September 2025, announcing days later that she would launch a bid for the Democratic Party nomination for governor in the 2026 Wisconsin gubernatorial election. She joined a crowded primary field, including incumbent lieutenant governor Sara Rodriguez, Milwaukee County executive David Crowley, Madison state senator Kelda Roys, Madison state representative Francesca Hong, and former Madison state representative Brett Hulsey. Hughes ran as a political outsider, with a focus on her business and agriculture background. On June 22, 2026, Hughes announced that she was exiting the race and endorsed Sara Rodriguez.

== Personal life and family ==
Missy Hughes is one of seven children born to medical doctors Philip and Aimée (née Diefenbach) Larkin. Her mother was one of the first women to graduate from Columbia University College of Physicians and Surgeons, in 1950, and worked for many years as chief of allergy and immunology at White Plains Hospital. Her father was a physician and urologist for 50 years in White Plains.

Missy Larkin took the last name Hughes when she married Paul H. "Tripp" Hughes III. They have three children and maintain a sheep farm outside Viroqua, Wisconsin.

== Electoral history ==
=== Wisconsin governor (2026) ===
Wisconsin Gubernatorial Election, 2026
Party	Candidate	Votes	%	±%
Democratic Primary, August 11, 2026 (unofficial results)
Democratic	David Crowley	315,235	39.81%	
Democratic	Francesca Hong	311,475	39.33%	
Democratic	Kelda Roys	59,433	7.51%	
Democratic	Joel Brennan	37,132	4.69%	
Democratic	Sara Rodriguez (withdrawn)	32,682	4.13%	
Democratic	Mandela Barnes (withdrawn)	32,410	4.09%	
Democratic	Missy Hughes (withdrawn)	3,245	0.41%	
	Scattering	271	0.03%	
Plurality		3,760	0.47%	
Total votes		791,883	100.0%	
