= Joel Brennan =

United States politician

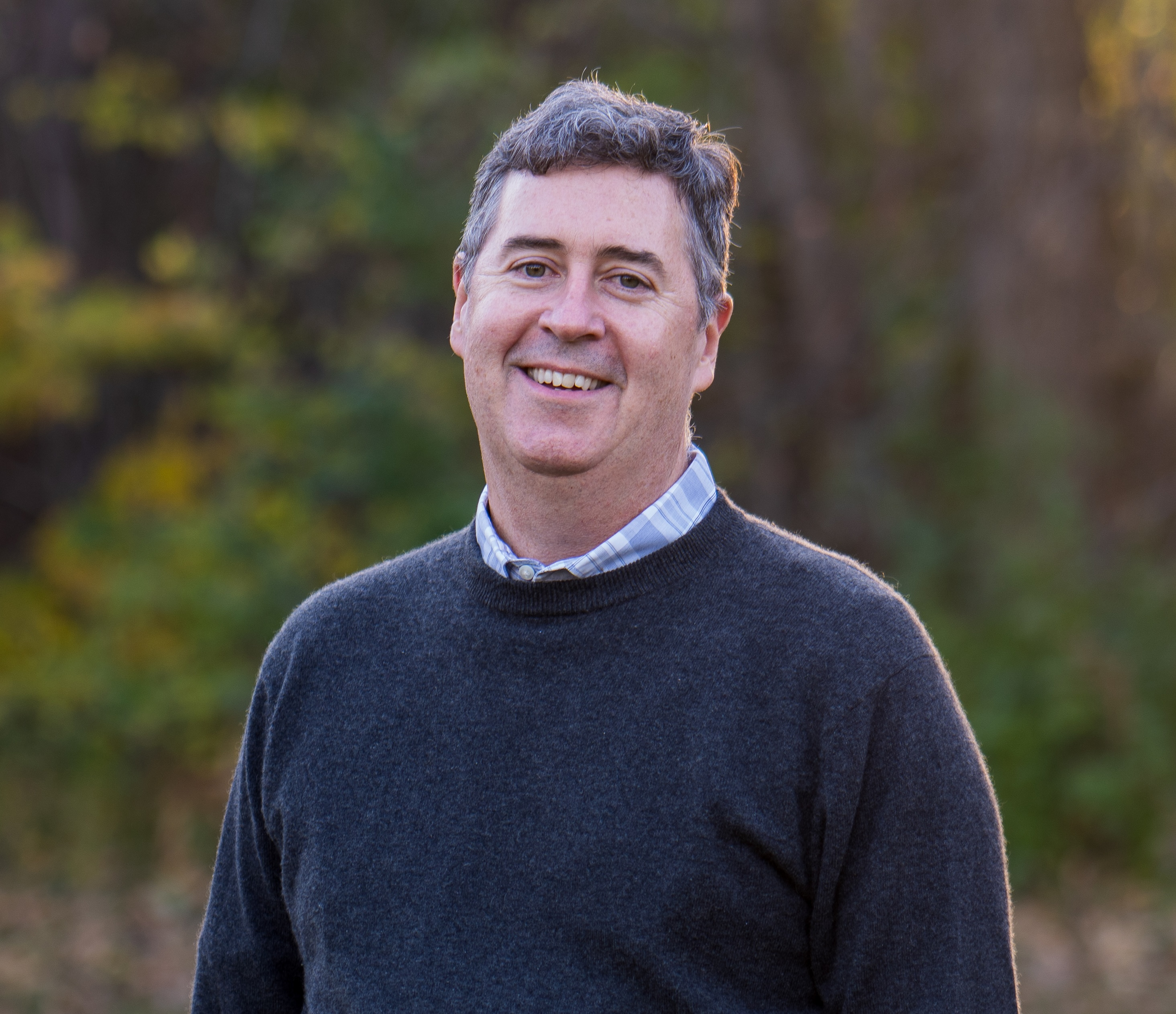

18th Secretary of the Wisconsin Department of Administration
- In office January 7, 2019 – January 17, 2022
- Governor: Tony Evers
- Preceded by: Ellen Nowak
- Succeeded by: Kathy Koltin Blumenfeld

Personal details
- Born: 1970 (age 55–56) Wisconsin, U.S.
- Party: Democratic
- Education: Marquette University (BA); University of Chicago (MPP)

Joel Brennan (born 1970) is an American businessman and politician who was the 18th secretary of the Wisconsin Department of Administration from 2019 to 2022, under Governor Tony Evers. He is the president of the Greater Milwaukee Committee and was a candidate in the Democratic primary for governor of Wisconsin in the 2026 election.

== Early life and education ==
Joel Brennan was born and raised in Wisconsin. He is one of 11 children. He attended Marquette University High School and graduated magna cum laude from Marquette University with a bachelor's degree in English. He later earned a master's degree in Public Policy from the University of Chicago Harris School of Public Policy. Brennan and his wife, Audra, have two children.

== Career ==
Early in his career, Brennan managed campaigns for former Milwaukee mayor Tom Barrett and led the Milwaukee Redevelopment Authority under Barrett. He worked in government relations at Miller Brewing Company and served as a vice president at the Greater Milwaukee Convention & Visitors Bureau. Brennan then spent over a decade as president and CEO of Discovery World, a science and technology museum on Milwaukee's lakefront.

In December 2018, Governor-elect Tony Evers nominated Brennan as secretary of the Wisconsin Department of Administration. He was confirmed unanimously by the Wisconsin State Senate in October 2019. As secretary, Brennan oversaw state budget negotiations with the Republican-controlled Legislature and was the lead state official in renegotiating the state's contract with Taiwanese electronics manufacturer Foxconn, reducing the maximum state tax credit exposure from $2.85 billion to $80 million.

In late 2021, Brennan announced he was leaving the Evers administration to become president of the Greater Milwaukee Committee, a Milwaukee business and civic organization.

=== 2026 Wisconsin gubernatorial campaign ===
In December 2025, Brennan announced his candidacy for the Democratic nomination in the 2026 Wisconsin gubernatorial election. Former Milwaukee mayor and U.S. ambassador Tom Barrett endorsed his campaign. In his first campaign finance report covering July through December 2025, Brennan raised $566,212, ranking third among Democratic candidates in the race behind David Crowley and Sara Rodriguez. Brennan ultimately placed fourth in the primary, behind Crowley, Francesca Hong, and Kelda Roys.

== Electoral history ==
=== Wisconsin governor (2026) ===
Year	Election	Date	Elected				Defeated				Total	Plurality
2026	Primary	Aug. 11	David Crowley	Democratic	315,413	39.81%	Francesca Hong	Dem.	311,740	39.35%	792,290	3,673
2026	Primary	Aug. 11	David Crowley	Democratic	315,413	39.81%	Kelda Roys	Dem.	59,394	7.50%	792,290	3,673
2026	Primary	Aug. 11	David Crowley	Democratic	315,413	39.81%	Joel Brennan	Dem.	37,084	4.68%	792,290	3,673
2026	Primary	Aug. 11	David Crowley	Democratic	315,413	39.81%	Sara Rodriguez (withdrawn)	Dem.	32,674	4.12%	792,290	3,673
2026	Primary	Aug. 11	David Crowley	Democratic	315,413	39.81%	Mandela Barnes (withdrawn)	Dem.	32,435	4.09%	792,290	3,673
2026	Primary	Aug. 11	David Crowley	Democratic	315,413	39.81%	Missy Hughes (withdrawn)	Dem.	3,230	0.41%	792,290	3,673
2026	Primary	Aug. 11	David Crowley	Democratic	315,413	39.81%	Brett Hulsey (write-in; withdrawn)	Dem.	13	0.00%	792,290	3,673
2026	Primary	Aug. 11	David Crowley	Democratic	315,413	39.81%	Tim Reppen (write-in)	Dem.	10	0.00%	792,290	3,673
