= Lisa Subeck =

21st century American politician

Member of the Wisconsin State Assembly
- Incumbent
- Assumed office January 6, 2025
- Preceded by: Alex Joers
- Constituency: 79th district
- In office January 7, 2015 – January 6, 2025
- Preceded by: Brett Hulsey
- Succeeded by: Shelia Stubbs
- Constituency: 78th district

Member of the Madison Common Council from the 1st district
- In office April 13, 2011 – April 21, 2015
- Preceded by: Jed Sanborn
- Succeeded by: Barbara Harrington-McKinney

Personal details
- Born: June 17, 1971 (age 55) Chicago, Illinois, U.S.
- Party: Democratic; Progressive Dane (2005)
- Education: University of Wisconsin–Madison (B.A.)
- Website: Official website

Lisa B. Subeck (born June 17, 1971) is an American political organizer and Democratic politician from Madison, Wisconsin. She is a member of the Wisconsin State Assembly, representing the west side of the city of Madison since January 2015. Prior to her election to the state Assembly, she served four years on the Madison Common Council.

== Early life and career ==
Born in Chicago, Illinois, Subeck graduated from Rich Central High School in Olympia Fields, Illinois. She went on to earn her bachelor's degree in Psychology from the University of Wisconsin–Madison in 1993.

Subeck began her career after college working on programs for children and young mothers. She became a Dane County program director for the Head Start and Early Head Start programs, and helped launch Hope House, a Madison-based housing program for young mothers of infants and toddlers. In 1998, she also began teaching early education courses at Madison Area Technical College, and, in 2003, became a program coordinator for the Madison YWCA.

== Political career ==
Her work on social programs assisting families and children led her into policy advocacy. In 2005, she made her first attempt for elected office, running as a Progressive Dane candidate for Madison Common Council. She was defeated by Jed Sanborn, who was one of a number of Democratic Party candidates backed by a coalition of realty and development interests.

She continued her involvement in local affairs, and was a member of Madison's Community Services Committee, Equal Opportunities Commission, and Madison's Southwest Neighborhood Plan Committee. In 2009, she was hired as executive director for NARAL Pro-Choice Wisconsin, and, in 2011, she made another attempt for election to City Council. This time, she was supported by the Democratic Party of Wisconsin. She topped a field of five candidates in the nonpartisan primary, and went on to win 58% of the vote against her general election opponent, who identified as a fiscally-conservative moderate.

=== City council ===
In 2011, Subeck and fellow Alder Matthew Phair introduced a series of budget amendments to address crime, gang and drug violence in the Southwest section of Madison. The budget amendments included $30,000 for police overtime as part of a community safety initiative, $900,000 for the purchase and rehabilitation of a vacant restaurant building for a community center, funding for a spray park, and $60,000 for an additional building inspector to work in deteriorating neighborhoods. A majority of the items were passed in the 2012 budget. A spray park opened at Elver Park in 2014, and after two years of negotiations, the city of Madison purchased the former Griff's Restaurant and, in 2019, opened the center, now known as the Southwest Madison Employment Center.

In January 2012, Subeck joined five other alders in calling for fellow Alder Solomon to resign over allegations he sexually harassed and assaulted an assistant city clerk in January 2012. After a lengthy investigation the city's civil rights office found no proof that Solomon had sexually harassed the assistant city clerk and determined not to press charges. Solomon did not resign from office, but did not run for another term in 2013.

In 2013, Subeck worked with the Mayor to lead an effort to pass new campaign finance disclosure rules that exceed what is required by state law, requiring corporations and other entities making independent expenditures to disclose not only their campaign spending but also their donors who contributed to expenditures for or against a candidate in a city election.

=== State government ===
Subsequent to her election to the City Council, Subeck became involved in the project to recall Governor Scott Walker, and, in 2012, she was hired as executive director of United Wisconsin, an independent political action committee organized to facilitate that recall. Though the recall was unsuccessful, she continued to run United Wisconsin through the 2014 election.

In 2014, she announced a campaign for Wisconsin State Assembly in the 78th Assembly district. The 78th district was an open seat, as the incumbent, Brett Hulsey, chose to run instead for Governor of Wisconsin. In the Democratic primary, she defeated fellow city councilmember Mark Clear with 56% of the vote. She was unopposed in the 2014 general election, and was sworn in January 2015.

Subeck was subsequently reelected in 2016, 2018, and 2020.

In the Legislature, Subeck has been elected minority caucus vice-chair for the 2021–2022 session. She currently serves on the Assembly committees for Review of Administrative Rules, on Campaigns and Elections, on Energy and Utilities, on Health, and on Rules, and serves on the Joint Committee for Review of Administrative Rules.

In addition to her service in the Legislature, Subeck serves as the Wisconsin director of the National Foundation for Women Legislators, and is an executive board member of the Women's Legislative Network of the National Conference of State Legislatures.

== Elections ==
=== Madison City Council (2005) ===
Madison Common Council, District 1 Election, 2005
Party	Candidate	Votes	%	±%
General Election, April 8, 2005
Nonpartisan	Jed Sanborn	1,033	58.99%	
Nonpartisan	Lisa B. Subeck	714	40.77%	
	Scattering	4	0.22%	
Plurality		319	18.22%	
Total votes		1,751	100.0%	

=== Madison City Council (2011, 2013) ===
Madison Common Council, District 1 Election, 2011
Party	Candidate	Votes	%	±%
Nonpartisan Primary, February 17, 2011
Nonpartisan	Lisa B. Subeck	820	47.54%	
Nonpartisan	Brian Driscoll	355	20.58%	
Nonpartisan	Richard Williams	274	15.88%	
Nonpartisan	Danny Thomas	185	10.72%	
Nonpartisan	Matthew C. Brink	85	4.93%	
	Scattering	6	0.35%	
Plurality		465	26.96%	
Total votes		1,725	100.0%	
General Election, April 5, 2011
Nonpartisan	Lisa B. Subeck	2,573	58.04%	
Nonpartisan	Brian Driscoll	1,837	41.44%	
	Scattering	23	0.52%	
Plurality		736	16.60%	
Total votes		4,433	100.0%	

Madison Common Council, District 1 Election, 2013
Party	Candidate	Votes	%	±%
General Election, April 2, 2013
Democratic	Lisa B. Subeck (incumbent)	823	75.23%	+17.19%
Independent	Philip Alan Sigurslid	260	23.77%	
	Scattering	11	1.01%	
Plurality		563	51.46%	+34.86%
Total votes		1,094	100.0%	-75.32%

=== Wisconsin State Assembly, 78th district (2014–2022) ===
Year	Type	Date	Elected				Defeated				Total	Plurality
2014	Primary	Aug. 12	Lisa Subeck	Democratic	3,827	56.72%	Mark Clear	Dem.	2,913	43.17%	6,747	914
2014	General	Nov. 4	Lisa Subeck	Democratic	23,014	97.99%	--unopposed--				23,486	22,542
2016	Primary	Aug. 9	Lisa Subeck (inc)	Democratic	6,882	85.34%	Jacob Wischmeier	Dem.	1,170	14.51%	8,064	5,712
2016	General	Nov. 8	Lisa Subeck (inc)	Democratic	25,362	78.90%	Chris V. Fisher	Rep.	6,661	20.72%	32,144	18,701
2018	General	Nov. 6	Lisa Subeck (inc)	Democratic	30,044	98.06%	--unopposed--				30,639	29,449
2020	Primary	Aug. 11	Lisa Subeck (inc)	Democratic	14,092	91.33%	Rob Slamka	Dem.	1,321	8.56%	15,429	12,771
2020	General	Nov. 3	Lisa Subeck (inc)	Democratic	34,576	97.96%	--unopposed--				35,296	33,856
2022	General	Nov. 8	Lisa Subeck (inc)	Democratic	26,817	82.02%	Matt Neuhaus	Rep.	5,845	17.88%	32,696	20,972

=== Wisconsin State Assembly, 79th district (2024) ===
Year	Type	Date	Elected				Defeated	Total	Plurality
2024	General	Nov. 5	Lisa Subeck	Democratic	32,151	98.60%	--Unopposed--	32,696	20,972

Wisconsin State Assembly
Preceded by Brett Hulsey	Member of the Wisconsin State Assembly from the 78th district January 7, 2015 – January 6, 2025	Succeeded by Shelia Stubbs
Preceded by Alex Joers	Member of the Wisconsin State Assembly from the 79th district January 6, 2025 – present	Incumbent
