= Dennis McBride =

American politician

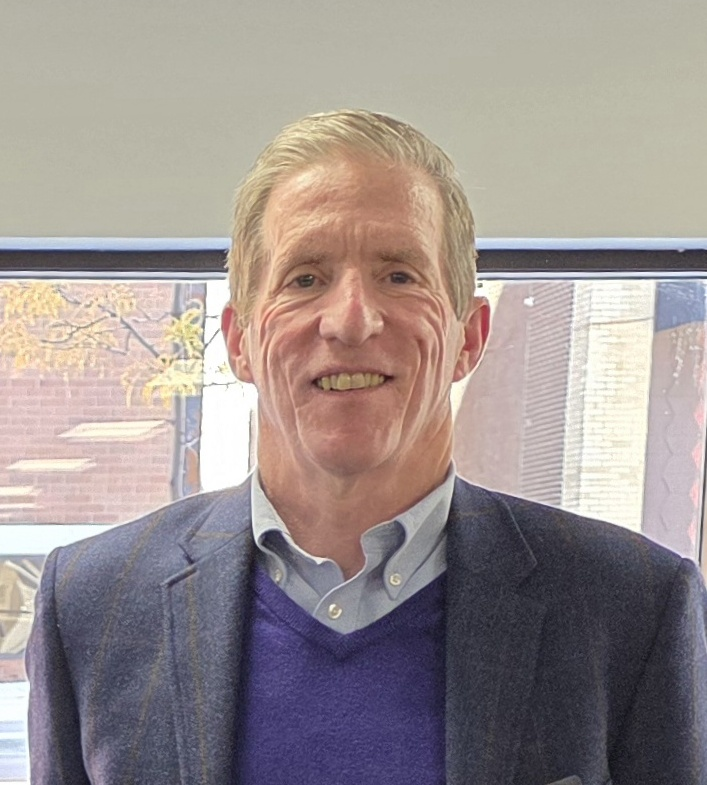
- McBride in October 2025

Mayor of Wauwatosa, Wisconsin
- Incumbent
- Assumed office 2020

Wauwatosa Common Council President
- In office 2012–2016

Personal details
- Profession: Lawyer
- Website: mcbride4tosa.com

Dennis McBride is an American politician who currently serves as the mayor of Wauwatosa, Wisconsin. He is the author of the book, A City on Edge: Pandemic, Protest, and Polarization, published by Indiana University Press, which discuses his first year as mayor.

== Career ==
McBride was an attorney. He served as an alderman on the Wauwatosa Common Council, representing the 4th District, from 2008 to 2018. During his tenure, he served as the Council President from 2012 through 2016.

McBride won the Wauwatosa mayoral race in April 2020 with nearly 60% of the vote. He ran against Andrew Meindl in 2024 and won.
