= Bill Clinton presidential campaign =

Bill Clinton, the 42nd president of the United States (1993–2001) and former Governor of Arkansas (1979-1981, 1982-1992), has sought the presidency twice winning both times. Clinton selected Tennessee Senator Al Gore as his running mate both times.

- Bill Clinton 1992 presidential campaign, a successful election campaign that resulted in him being elected the 42nd President of the United States
- Bill Clinton 1996 presidential campaign, a successful reelection campaign
