= Dan Schooff =

American politician

Dan Schooff (born December 10, 1971) is a former American Democratic politician from Wisconsin.

Born in Beloit, Wisconsin, Schooff graduated from Beloit Catholic High School. In 1994, Schooff graduated from University of Wisconsin–Madison and was a businessman. He served in the Wisconsin State Assembly from 1997 until he resigned in 2004.
