= Wisconsin Department of Administration =

Wisconsin state government agency

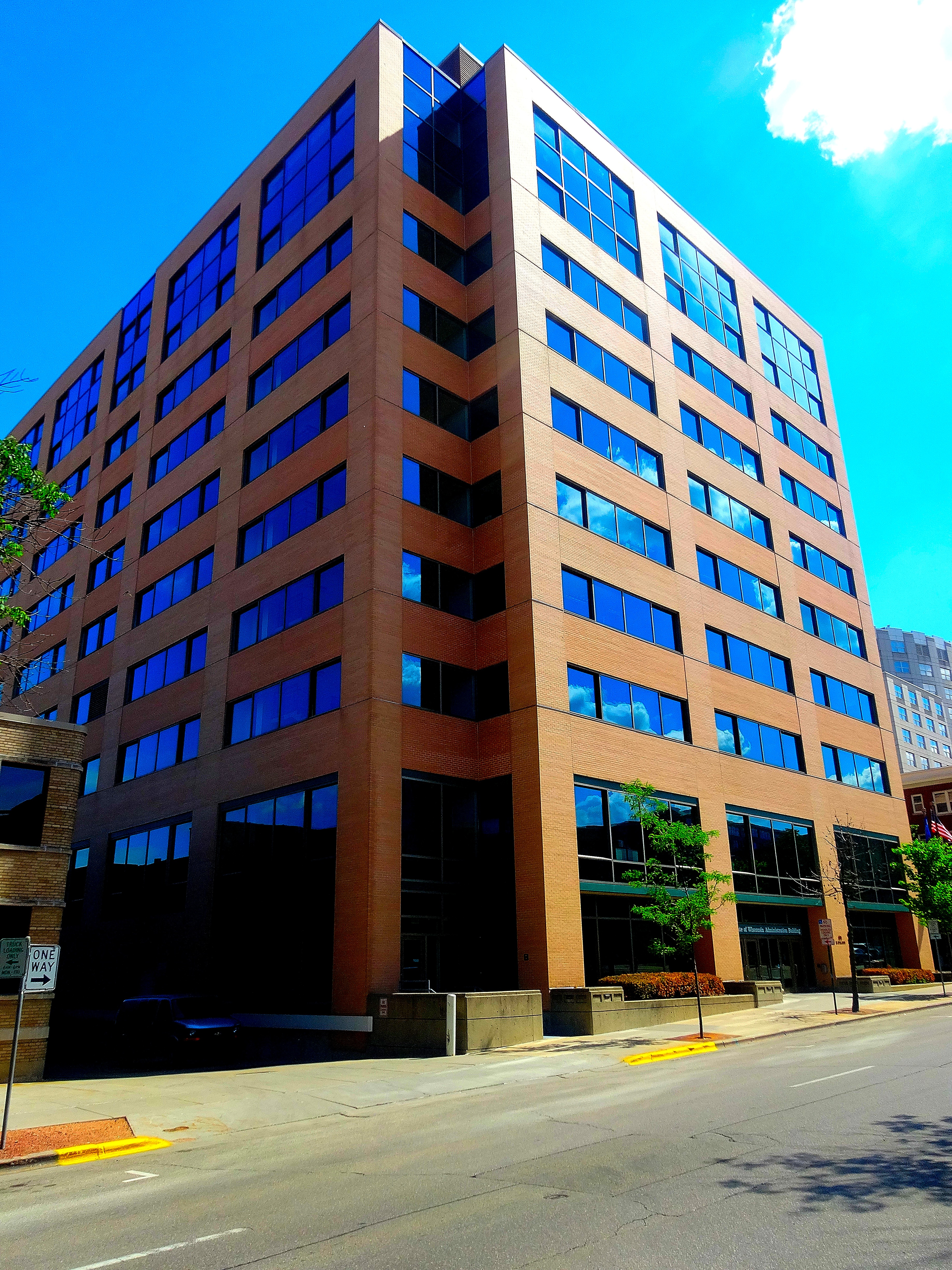
- Wisconsin Administration Building

Agency overview
- Formed: July 31, 1959; 67 years ago
- Headquarters: Wisconsin Administration Building 101 E. Wilson St. Madison, Wisconsin, U.S.; 43°4′23.88″N 89°22′46.452″W
- Employees: 1,436.08 (2021)
- Annual budget: $1,997,923,700 (2021)
- Agency executives: Kathy Koltin Blumenfeld, Secretary; Anne L. Hanson, Deputy Secretary; Diana Maas, Assistant Deputy Secretary
- Website: doa.wisconsin.gov

The Wisconsin Department of Administration (DOA) is an agency of the Wisconsin state government which provides a range of services and programs, including operations, technology, logistical support, assistance programs for low-income homes, to state gaming. The department's services to other state agencies and offices include personnel management, payroll, accounting systems, technology solutions, and legal services. The department is central to the state budget process, advising the Governor and state agencies on their budget submissions and analyzing solutions to fiscal problems. The department also administers state information systems, procurement policies and contracts, fleet transportation, and risk management, and oversees buildings owned and leased by the state, facilities planning projects, and the Wisconsin Capitol Police. The department also administers the state's compensation plan, which includes the pay and benefit administration for most state employees.

The department is headquartered in the Wisconsin Administration Building in Madison, Wisconsin. Kathy Koltin Blumenfeld is the current Secretary of the Department of Administration, appointed by Governor Tony Evers on January 18, 2022.

== Organization ==
=== Leadership ===
The senior leadership of the department consists of the Secretary, Deputy Secretary, and Assistant Deputy Secretary, along with the administrators heading up the divisions of the department.

- Secretary: Kathy Koltin Blumenfeld
- Deputy Secretary: Anne Hanson
- Assistant Deputy Secretary: Diana Maas
- Energy, Housing and Community Resources: David Pawlisch
- Enterprise Operations: Richard Rydecki
- Enterprise Technology: Trina Zanow
- Executive Budget & Finance: Brian D. Pahnke
- Facilities Development: Naomi De Mers
- Facilities and Transportation Services: Sanjay Olson
- Gaming: John Dillett
- Hearings & Appeals: Brian Hayes
- Intergovernmental Relations: Dawn Vick
- Legal Services: Jennifer Vandermeuse
- Personnel Management: Donna Bente
- Chief, Wisconsin State Capitol Police: David M. Erwin

=== Divisions ===
==== Energy, Housing and Community Resources ====
The Division of Energy, Housing and Community Resources (DEHCR) develops state housing policy and offers program assistance and funds to address homelessness and support affordable housing, public infrastructure, and economic development opportunities. The division also administers the state program providing electric and heating payment assistance to eligible households, as well as benefits to assist with energy crisis situations and weatherization services. The division also manages power and heat generation for the state capitol building and downtown Madison through the nearby Capitol Heat & Water Plant.

==== Enterprise Operations ====
The Division of Enterprise Operations (DEO) administers enterprise policies governing procurement, risk management, fleet management, and records management, and provides services to the Department of Administration and other state agencies in financial management, procurement, fleet management, air transportation, records management, mail transportation, risk management. In addition, through the State Prosecutors Office, the division provides support to county district attorneys on budgeting, legislative research, grant support, and employment services. The division also facilitates opportunities for disadvantaged businesses to sell goods and services to state agencies.

Subdivisions include:

- State Bureau of Procurement
- Bureau of Enterprise Fleet
- Bureau of State Risk Management
- Bureau of Financial Management
- Supplier Diversity Program
- State Prosecutors Office (SPO)
- Continuity of Operations / Continuity of Government (COOP/COG)
- Serve Wisconsin
- Volkswagen Mitigation Program

==== Enterprise Technology ====
The Division of Enterprise Technology (DET) provides services, training, and knowledge to assist state agencies in utilizing technology to achieve their business objectives. In addition, every two years the division publishes a strategic IT plan for the state outlining new technology goals for the state government.

Subdivisions include:

- Application Services
- Bureau of Technical Architecture & Project Management
- Bureau of Policy and Budget
- Bureau of Infrastructure Support
- Bureau of Security
- Bureau of Publishing & Distribution
- Bureau of District Attorney IT

==== Executive Budget & Finance ====
The Division of Executive Budget and Finance provides accounting, budget, and financial services for the state government. The division also provides fiscal and policy analysis to the Governor for development of executive budget proposals, and assists agencies in the technical preparation of budget requests. It also reviews new legislation and prepares or coordinates the fiscal estimates that accompany all expenditure bills.

Subdivisions include:

- State Budget Office
- State Capital Finance Office
- State Controller's Office

==== Facilities Development & Management ====
The Division of Facilities Development & Management (DFDM) is responsible for producing and implementing the biennial State Building Program, which facilitates all construction, remodeling, renovation, and maintenance of facilities owned by the state government or the University of Wisconsin System. The division is also responsible for building management, maintenance, and tenant services for the State Capitol, the Executive Residence, and 28 other State office buildings.

==== Gaming ====
The Division of Gaming is charged with protecting the integrity of Indian and charitable gaming in Wisconsin. They handle licensing, background investigations, and regulatory enforcement activities to ensure compliance with state laws and regulations.

==== Hearings & Appeals ====
The Division of Hears & Appeals (DHA) is a quasi-judicial independent entity attached to the Department of Administration for administrative purposes. The division provides administrative hearings where administrative law judges, who do not work for the regulated agency, are able to provide a fair and impartial rulings on the administrative process.

Subdivisions include:

- Corrections Unit
- Office of Worker's Compensation Hearings
- General Government Unit
- Waste Facility Siting Board
- Work & Family Services Unit

==== Intergovernmental Relations ====
The Division of Intergovernmental Relations (DIR) supports Wisconsin's counties, municipalities, residents, and businesses with services in land use planning, land information and records modernization, municipal boundary review, plat review, demography, and coastal management programs.

==== Continuous Improvement ====
The Division of Continuous Improvement works to design and implement systems change within the state government to improve efficiency, solve problems, and encourage innovation.

==== Legal Services ====
The Division of Legal Services provides legal assistance to the Secretary, department managers, and staff. They provide guidance on procurement, contracting, administrative rule drafting and interpretation, construction, budget development, public records law, and other activities. The division also serves as a resource to other state agencies on these topics, with a goal to bring greater consistency to these common activities.

==== Personnel Management ====
The Division of Personnel Management (DPM) provides support to state agencies on human resources management. The division oversees the state civil service system, manages labor relations, develops and maintains the state classification and compensation systems, and leads the state's affirmative action and equal opportunity employment programs.

Subdivisions include:

- Bureau of Equity & Inclusion
- Bureau of Classification & Compensation
- Bureau of Employee Management
- Bureau of Merit Recruitment & Selection

==== Wisconsin State Capitol Police ====
The Capitol Police have statewide jurisdiction to enforce all civil and criminal laws. They are tasked with the safety of all state employees and the security of all facilities owned or leased by the state. They provide the personal security for the Governor, the Governor's family, the Lieutenant Governor, and other high ranking state officials and dignitaries.

Subdivision include:

- Patrol Operations Section
- Support Services Section
- Criminal Investigations Unit
- Dignitary Protection Unit
- K-9 Unit
- Unmanned Aircraft Unit

=== Secretaries and commissioners ===
==== Commissioners (1959–1968) ====
Commissioner	Took office	Left office	Notes
Joe E. Nusbaum	July 30, 1959	January 8, 1963	Appointed by Gaylord Nelson. Resigned.
Howard Koop	January 10, 1963	January 15, 1965	Appointed by John W. Reynolds Jr. Resigned.
George C. Kaiser	January 28, 1965	January 15, 1965	Appointed by Warren Knowles. Resigned.
Wayne McGown	July 11, 1967	March 1, 1968	Appointed by Warren Knowles. Converted to secretary.

==== Secretaries (1968–present) ====
Secretary	Took office	Left office	Notes
Wayne McGown	March 1, 1968	January 3, 1971	Appointed by Warren Knowles.
Joe E. Nusbaum	January 3, 1971	January 6, 1975	Nominated by Patrick Lucey. Resigned.
Tony Earl	January 6, 1975	December 15, 1975	Appointed by Patrick Lucey. Appointed to another job.
Robert H. Dunn	December 15, 1975	June 1, 1977	Appointed by Patrick Lucey. Replaced by governor.
John Torphy	June 1, 1977	January 1, 1979	Appointed by Martin J. Schreiber. Acting secretary until Feb. 1978.
Kenneth E. Lindner	January 1, 1979	January 3, 1983	Appointed by Lee S. Dreyfus.
Doris Hanson	January 3, 1983	January 5, 1987	Appointed by Tony Earl.
James R. Klauser	January 5, 1987	December 7, 1996	Appointed by Tommy Thompson. Resigned.
Mark Bugher	December 7, 1996	September 15, 1999	Appointed by Tommy Thompson. Resigned.
George Lightbourn	September 15, 1999	January 6, 2003	Appointed by Tommy Thompson.
Marc Marotta	January 6, 2003	October 3, 2005	Appointed by Jim Doyle.
Steve Bablitch	October 3, 2005	January 1, 2007	Appointed by Jim Doyle.
Michael Morgan	January 1, 2007	July 6, 2010	Appointed by Jim Doyle.
Dan Schooff	July 6, 2010	January 3, 2011	Appointed by Jim Doyle.
Michael Huebsch	January 3, 2011	March 1, 2015	Appointed by Scott Walker.
Scott Neitzel	March 1, 2015	March 5, 2018	Appointed by Scott Walker.
Ellen Nowak	March 5, 2018	January 7, 2019	Appointed by Scott Walker.
Joel Brennan	January 7, 2019	January 17, 2021	Appointed by Tony Evers.
Kathy Blumenfeld	January 17, 2021	Current	Appointed by Tony Evers.
