= Wisconsin's 12th Assembly district =

American legislative district in Milwaukee County, Wisconsin

Wisconsin's 12th State Assembly district
- 2024 map defined in 2023 Wisc. Act 94; 2022 map defined in Johnson v. Wisconsin Elections Commission; 2011 map was defined in 2011 Wisc. Act 43
Assemblymember
Russell Goodwin; D–Milwaukee
since January 6, 2025 (1 years)
- Demographics: 29.69% White; 57.01% Black; 5.24% Hispanic; 7.67% Asian; 1.46% Native American; 0.14% Hawaiian/Pacific Islander
- Population (2020) • Voting age: 59,351; 42,610
- Website: Official website
- Notes: Northwest Milwaukee County

The 12th Assembly district of Wisconsin is one of 99 districts in the Wisconsin State Assembly. Located in southeast Wisconsin, the district is entirely contained within northwest Milwaukee County. It comprises much of the far north of the city of Milwaukee as well as part of northern Wauwatosa and western Brown Deer. The district also includes most of the former town of Granville, Dretzka Park, and Lawrence J. Timmerman Airport. The district is represented by Democrat Russell Goodwin, since January 2025.

The 12th Assembly district is located within Wisconsin's 4th Senate district, along with the 10th and 11th Assembly districts.

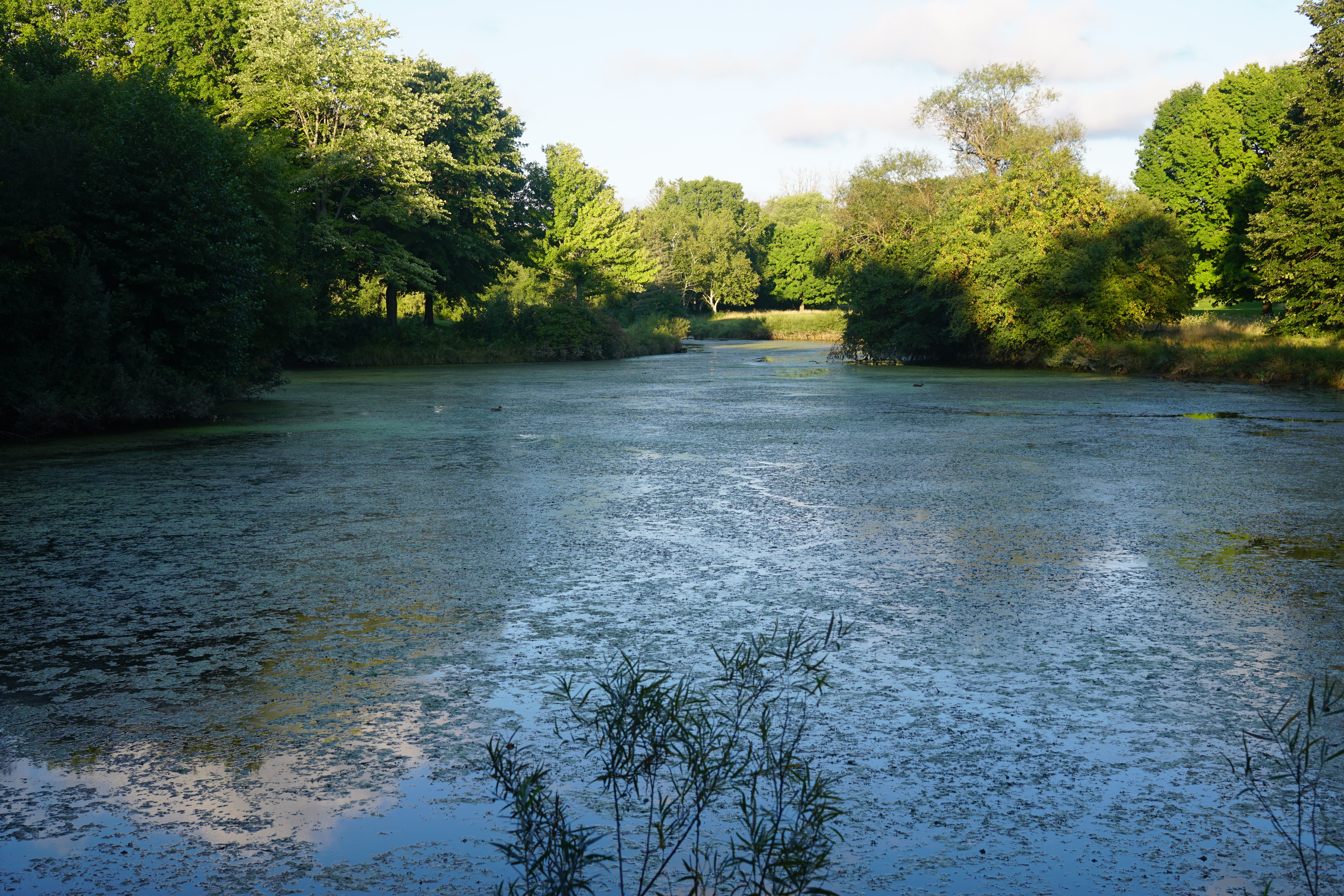
Dretzka Park

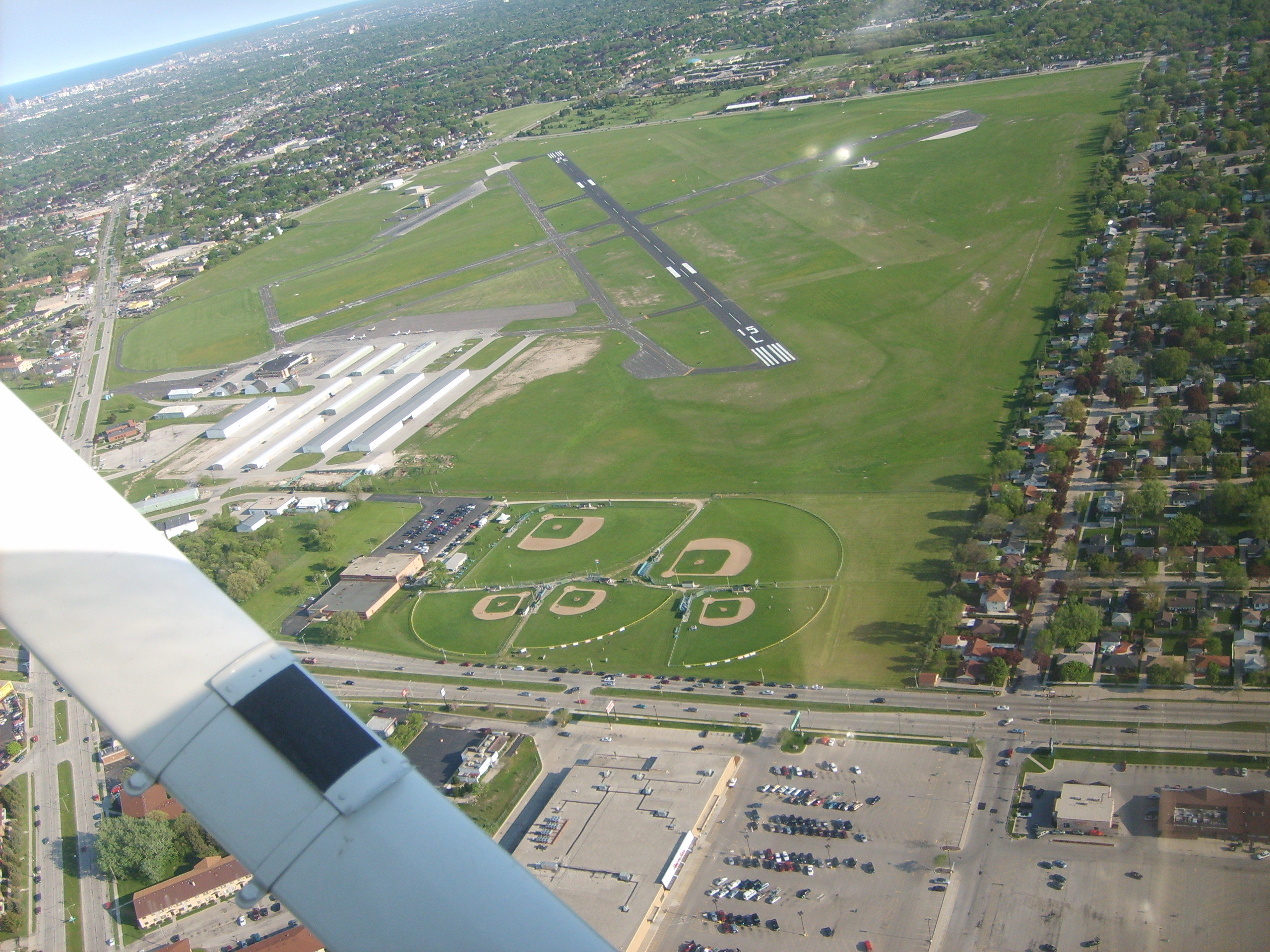
Lawrence J. Timmerman Airport

== History ==
The district was created in the 1972 redistricting act (1971 Wisc. Act 304) which first established the numbered district system, replacing the previous system which allocated districts to specific counties. The 12th district was drawn with novel boundaries in south and east Washington County, along with part of south Ozaukee County. In the prior legislative district scheme, Washington County and Ozaukee County were each single-district counties. The last representative of the Washington County district, Frederick C. Schroeder, went on to win election to become the first representative of the 12th Assembly district.

The 1982 court-ordered redistricting plan moved the 12th district into central Milwaukee County. The district has remained in Milwaukee County since then, though the boundaries shifted east in the 1983 legislative redistricting, and then north and west in 1992, 2002, and 2011, with the district now covering the northwest corner of the county.

== List of past representatives ==
List of representatives to the Wisconsin State Assembly from the 12th district
Member	Party	Residence	Counties represented	Term start	Term end	Ref.
District created
Frederick C. Schroeder	Rep.	Trenton	Ozaukee, Washington	January 1, 1973	January 3, 1977	
John L. Merkt	Rep.	Mequon	Ozaukee, Washington	January 3, 1977	January 3, 1983	
Marcia P. Coggs	Dem.	Milwaukee	Milwaukee	January 3, 1983	January 7, 1985	
Barbara Notestein	Dem.	Milwaukee	Milwaukee	January 7, 1985	January 4, 1993	
Shirley Krug	Dem.	Milwaukee	Milwaukee	January 4, 1993	January 3, 2005	
Fred Kessler	Dem.	Milwaukee	Milwaukee	January 3, 2005	January 6, 2019	
LaKeshia Myers	Dem.	Milwaukee	Milwaukee	January 6, 2019	January 6, 2023	
Russell Goodwin	Dem.	Milwaukee	Milwaukee	January 6, 2023	Current	
