= Frederick C. Schroeder =

American politician (1910-1980)

Member of the Wisconsin State Assembly
- In office January 1965 – January 1977
- Succeeded by: John L. Merkt
- Constituency: Washington County District (1965-1973); 12th District (1973-1977)

Personal details
- Born: Frederick C. Schroeder; January 19, 1910 West Bend, Wisconsin
- Died: November 1, 1980 (aged 70)
- Party: Republican
- Education: University of Wisconsin–Madison

Frederick C. Schroeder (January 19, 1910 – November 1, 1980) was a member of the Wisconsin State Assembly.

Schroeder was born in West Bend, Wisconsin. He attended the University of Wisconsin–Madison. He died on November 1, 1980.

== Career ==
Schroeder was first elected to the Assembly in 1964, after defeating nine other candidates for the Republican nomination. He was re-elected in 1966, 1968, 1970, 1972, and 1974.
