= Fred Kessler =

American lawyer, politician and judge (1940–2024)

The Honorable Fred Kessler

Member of the Wisconsin State Assembly
- In office January 3, 2005 – January 1, 2019
- Preceded by: Shirley Krug
- Succeeded by: LaKeshia Myers
- Constituency: 12th district
- In office January 4, 1965 – July 5, 1972
- Preceded by: Patrick H. Kelly
- Succeeded by: District abolished
- Constituency: Milwaukee 10th district
- In office January 2, 1961 – January 7, 1963
- Preceded by: Patrick H. Kelly
- Succeeded by: Patrick H. Kelly
- Constituency: Milwaukee 10th district

Wisconsin Circuit Court Judge for the Milwaukee Circuit, Branch 11
- In office August 1, 1986 – February 9, 1988
- Preceded by: Christ T. Seraphim
- Succeeded by: Dominic S. Amato

Wisconsin Circuit Court Judge for the Milwaukee Circuit, Branch 23
- In office August 1, 1978 – June 2, 1981
- Preceded by: Transitioned from County Court
- Succeeded by: Janine P. Geske

County Judge of Milwaukee County Branch 4
- In office July 5, 1972 – July 31, 1978
- Appointed by: Patrick Lucey
- Preceded by: Christ T. Seraphim
- Succeeded by: Transitioned to Circuit Court

Personal details
- Born: January 11, 1940 Milwaukee, Wisconsin, U.S.
- Died: November 12, 2024 (aged 84)
- Party: Democratic
- Spouse: Joan F. Kessler (m. 1966–2024)
- Children: 2
- Education: University of Wisconsin–Madison
- Profession: Attorney
- Website: Official Website

Frederick P. Kessler (January 11, 1940 – November 12, 2024) was an American lawyer, arbitrator, judge, and Democratic Party politician. He served as a member of the Wisconsin State Assembly for 24 years between 1961 and 2019, and served 11 years as a state judge in the 1970s and 1980s.

Fred Kessler was married Joan F. Kessler, who was the first woman to serve as a U.S. attorney for Wisconsin, she later also served as a Wisconsin Court of Appeals judge.

== Early life ==
Kessler was born January 11, 1940, in Milwaukee and attended Our Redeemer Lutheran School in Madison until he became a Page of the United States House of Representatives, serving from 1955 and attending the House Page School. He ultimately graduated from Milwaukee Lutheran High School and worked briefly as a machine operator (becoming a member of the United Steel Workers) and salesman, before his 1960 election to the Assembly. He was involved in the movement to draft John F. Kennedy to run for President in 1960, serving as Chairman of the Wisconsin Youth for Kennedy Club in 1959. He was the youngest Chairman of the Wauwatosa City Democratic Committee at age 19.

== First terms in the Assembly ==
In 1960, Kessler ran for Wisconsin State Assembly in Milwaukee County's 10th Assembly district (at the time the district comprised just the 10th ward of the city of Milwaukee). Kessler was one of five Democrats challenging incumbent Patrick H. Kelly in the Democratic primary. Kessler ultimately prevailed with 38% of the vote and went on to defeat Republican Herbert W. Smith in the general election. On the opening day of the 1961 legislative session, January 11, 1961, Kessler's 21st birthday, he became the youngest person, up to that time, ever to serve in the Wisconsin Legislature. He was assigned to the standing committee on education. In 1962, rather than running for re-election, he sought the Democratic nomination for the Wisconsin's 6th State Senate district, but came in 2nd to Martin J. Schreiber in a four-way primary. Patrick Kelly reclaimed his old Assembly seat.

While serving in the Assembly, Kessler earned his bachelor's degree from the University of Wisconsin-Madison in 1962, and after his term expired, he worked with Governor John Reynolds' staff on reapportionment litigation in 1964.

In 1964, he again unseated Patrick Kelly, taking an absolute majority in a five-way Democratic primary (Kelly himself came in third), and won the general election 7,004 to 2,525. He was assigned to the Assembly committees on elections and the judiciary, and a joint committee on revisions, repeals and uniform laws. Kessler received a law degree from the University of Wisconsin Law School in 1966, and was re-elected easily in 1966, 1968 and 1970.

== Redistricting ==
Kessler played a significant role in Wisconsin's redistricting fights of the 1960s and 1970s. In the 1960s, he was part of Governor Reynolds' team arguing before the Wisconsin Supreme Court over the failure of the state Legislature to pass a new redistricting plan after the 1960 census. After the Legislature failed to meet several deadlines, the Court ultimately drew its own map. Governor Reynolds embraced the court-ordered map and called it, "the culmination of my four-year fight for equal voting rights for the people of the state of Wisconsin."

In 1971, Kessler was chairman of the Assembly elections committee and the principal negotiator for Democrats crafting a new reapportionment bill. The 1970s redistricting was further complicated by the new federal Voting Rights Act of 1965 and accompanying U.S. Supreme Court opinions which set a legal mandate for states to seek equal representation in legislative districts. Requirements in the Wisconsin Constitution created unique technical challenges to achieving equal representation, and the state government was under divided partisan control. Kessler set out a plan to achieve the various goals by disregarding strict adherence to county boundaries, eliminating 1 Assembly seat, and establishing a uniform 3-to-1 ratio of Assembly to Senate seats. Republicans and Democrats soon agreed with his recommendations, but disagreed over the final map. Finally, in an April 1972 special session of the Legislature, a compromise was reached.

== Judiciary ==
After the end of the Legislative session in 1972, Lucey appointed Kessler to a vacant county judgeship. He was subsequently elected to a full term in April 1973.

Kessler was appointed to the Wisconsin Legislative Council Committee on Court Reorganization in 1978. He was a leader in the fight for a single level trial court and the appointment by the Supreme Court of the district chief judges (both which were approved by an 8 to 7 vote on the committee, and ultimately signed into law). He also initiated a successful effort in 1979, to outlaw commercial surety bail bonding, resulting in Wisconsin becoming the fourth state to prohibit the practice. Due to the judicial reform law, his position of county judge was abolished and he was transitioned into a circuit judge for Milwaukee County, effective August 1, 1978. He was elected to another term April 3, 1979.

Kessler resigned his judgeship on June 2, 1981, to attempt a run for the vacant seat in Wisconsin's 5th congressional district in 1982. Kessler came in 2nd in the crowded ten-person Democratic primary, which included several past and current legislators, county supervisors, and the wife of Milwaukee mayor Henry Maier.

In April 1986, Kessler ran for and defeated controversial Wisconsin circuit judge Christ T. Seraphim by a final margin (after recounts) of 485 votes (55,690 to Seraphim's 55,205). He resigned the judgeship in early 1988 when he planned to make another run for United States House of Representatives, but ultimately dropped out before the primary.

== After the judiciary ==
After leaving the court, Kessler worked as an attorney, labor arbitrator, and redistricting consultant.

As a civic leader, Kessler, in 1979, along with Milwaukee School Board member Leon Todd successfully led an effort to create three language immersion elementary schools in Milwaukee, one each in German, French and Spanish, see Milwaukee German Immersion School, Milwaukee French Immersion School. On May 15, 2014, Kessler and Todd receive a lifetime achievement award from the German Immersion Foundation for their effort in 1979.

He made another run for Congress in 1992 when the 5th congressional district seat became vacant again, but came in 3rd in a six-person Democratic primary.

== Return to the Assembly ==
On April 6, 2004, his wife Joan F. Kessler, a long-time member of the board of governors of the State Bar of Wisconsin, unseated incumbent Court of Appeals Judge Charles B. Schudson. In November 2004, Fred Kessler returned to the Assembly, from the 12th District (northwestern Milwaukee, a part of Wauwatosa and one precinct in Waukesha County). He was assigned to the committees on campaigns and elections; criminal justice and homeland security; the judiciary; and state-federal relations. He was re-elected without opposition in 2006 and 2008; and in 2010 won re-election over Republican Sam Hagedorn.

In 2012, after a drastic redistricting by the Republican-controlled legislature removed his home from the 12th and changed the racial complexion completely, Kessler faced a challenge in the Democratic primary from African-American newcomer Mario Hall, who was reported to be a school choice supporter with backing from the pro-voucher American Federation for Children and allied organizations. Kessler (who had to move into the redrawn district) won with 71% of the vote, and faced no challenger in the November general election. Kessler was re-elected without significant opposition in 2014 (one Democratic and one Republican challenger failed to make the ballot; the Republican received .3% of the vote in the general election as a write-in candidate). In 2016, he had no challengers in the primary or general election.

Kessler ran for re-election in 2018 but was defeated in the Democratic primary by schoolteacher LaKeshia Myers.

== Personal life and death ==
Kessler was a member of Goethe House (vice president, president); the Milwaukee Chapter of the ACLU (board member, president); World Affairs Council of Milwaukee (board member); Wisconsin Bar Association; Wisconsin State Historical Society (board member); Industrial Relations Research Association, DANK (German-American National Congress) – Milwaukee chapter (vice president); Milwaukee Donauschwaben; Amnesty International Group 107 (chairman); Milwaukee Turners; N.A.A.C.P.; and a member of the City of Milwaukee Harbor Commission.

Kessler was an active member of the Milwaukee Turners, a prominent organization dedicated to social justice and community engagement. Born to immigrant parents from Germany who settled in the city between World War I and World War II, he followed his father, a leader in the German American community, by becoming involved at Turner Hall.

Fred and Joan Kessler had two children. He died from cancer on November 12, 2024, at the age of 84.

== Electoral history ==
=== Wisconsin Assembly, Milwaukee 10th district (1960) ===
Wisconsin Assembly, Milwaukee 10th District Election, 1960
Party	Candidate	Votes	%	±%
Democratic Primary, September 13, 1960
Democratic	Frederick P. Kessler	932	38.01%	
Democratic	Patrick H. Kelly (incumbent)	654	26.67%	
Democratic	Thomas J. Higgins	264	10.77%	
Democratic	George D. Havey	241	9.83%	
Democratic	Joseph H. Herro	213	8.69%	
Democratic	Jess F. Klingenberg	148	6.04%	
Total votes		2,452	100.0%	
General Election, November 3, 1960
Democratic	Frederick P. Kessler	6,148	63.17%	+3.50%
Republican	Herbert Warren Smith	3,585	36.83%	+5.98%
Plurality		2,563	26.33%	-2.48%
Total votes		9,733	100.0%	+45.29%
Democratic hold				

=== Wisconsin Senate (1962) ===
Wisconsin Senate, 6th District Election, 1962
Party	Candidate	Votes	%	±%
Democratic Primary, September 11, 1962
Democratic	Martin J. Schreiber	3,250	41.28%	
Democratic	Frederick P. Kessler	2,890	36.71%	
Democratic	Richard C. Emery	1,344	17.07%	
Democratic	John Schaller	389	4.94%	
Total votes		7,873	100.0%	

=== Wisconsin Assembly, Milwaukee 10th district (1964–1970) ===
Year	Election	Date	Elected				Defeated				Total	Plurality
1964	Primary	Sep. 8	Frederick Kessler	Democratic	1,823	59.77%	William E. Nagel	Dem.	489	16.03%	3,050	1,334
1964	Primary	Sep. 8	Frederick Kessler	Democratic	1,823	59.77%	Patrick H. Kelly (inc.)	Dem.	421	13.80%	3,050	1,334
1964	Primary	Sep. 8	Frederick Kessler	Democratic	1,823	59.77%	James DeWitt	Dem.	261	8.56%	3,050	1,334
1964	Primary	Sep. 8	Frederick Kessler	Democratic	1,823	59.77%	Robert E. Watt	Dem.	56	1.84%	3,050	1,334
1964	General	Nov. 3	Frederick Kessler	Democratic	7,004	73.50%	Kenneth R. Sherwin	Rep.	2,525	26.50%	9,529	4,479
1966	General	Nov. 8	Frederick Kessler (inc.)	Democratic	2,984	66.05%	Albert M. Cortell	Rep.	1,534	33.95%	4,518	1,450
1968	Primary	Sep. 10	Frederick Kessler (inc.)	Democratic	1,166	82.81%	Eugene O'Connell	Dem.	242	17.19%	1,408	924
1968	General	Nov. 8	Frederick Kessler (inc.)	Democratic	5,183	69.16%	Thomas Miller	Rep.	2,311	30.84%	7,494	2,872
1970	General	Nov. 3	Frederick Kessler (inc.)	Democratic	3,795	77.48%	Paul E. Chovanec	Rep.	1,103	22.52%	4,898	2,692

=== U.S. House of Representatives (1982) ===
Wisconsin's 5th Congressional District Election, 1982
Party	Candidate	Votes	%	±%
Democratic Primary, September 14, 1982
Democratic	Jim Moody	17,073	18.52%	
Democratic	Frederick P. Kessler	15,804	17.14%	
Democratic	Orville E. Pitts	15,264	16.55%	
Democratic	Warren D. Braun	13,320	14.45%	
Democratic	Marty Aronson	11,799	12.80%	
Democratic	Kevin D. O'Connor	10,368	11.24%	
Democratic	Karen Lamb	3,814	4.14%	
Democratic	Harout O. Sanasarian	2,812	3.05%	
Democratic	Roman R. Blenski	1,409	1.53%	
Democratic	John Werner	539	0.58%	
Plurality		1,269	1.38%	
Total votes		92,202	100.0%	

=== Wisconsin Circuit Court (1986) ===
Wisconsin Circuit Court, Milwaukee Circuit, Branch 11 Election, 1986
Party	Candidate	Votes	%	±%
General Election, April 1, 1986
Nonpartisan	Frederick P. Kessler	55,690	50.22%	
Nonpartisan	Christ T. Seraphim (incumbent)	55,205	49.78%	
Total votes		110,895	100.0%	

=== U.S. House of Representatives (1988, 1992) ===
Wisconsin's 5th Congressional District Election, 1988
Party	Candidate	Votes	%	±%
Democratic Primary, September 13, 1988
Democratic	Jim Moody (incumbent)	47,789	58.99%	
Democratic	Matthew J. Flynn	19,906	24.57%	
Democratic	Donald Sykes	5,314	6.56%	
Democratic	Terrance L. Pitts	4,966	6.13%	
Democratic	Frederick P. Kessler	2,517	3.11%	
Democratic	Roman R. Blenski	517	0.64%	
Plurality		27,883	34.42%	
Total votes		81,009	100.0%	

Wisconsin's 5th Congressional District Election, 1992
Party	Candidate	Votes	%	±%
Democratic Primary, September 13, 1988
Democratic	Thomas Barrett	34,301	41.07%	
Democratic	Terrance L. Pitts	18,928	22.66%	
Democratic	Frederick P. Kessler	15,729	18.83%	
Democratic	Marc J. Marotta	13,411	16.06%	
Democratic	Roman R. Blenski	662	0.79%	
Democratic	Gerald D. Wilson	483	0.58%	
Plurality		15,373	18.41%	
Total votes		83,514	100.0%	

=== Wisconsin Assembly, 12th district (2004–2018) ===
Year	Election	Date	Elected				Defeated				Total	Plurality
2004	Primary	Sep. 14	Frederick Kessler	Democratic	3,112	55.31%	Rene Settle-Robinson	Dem.	2,496	44.37%	5,626	616
2004	General	Nov. 2	Frederick Kessler	Democratic	18,720	90.98%	Kenneth R. Sherwin	Con.	1,761	8.56%	20,576	16,959
2006	General	Nov. 7	Frederick Kessler (inc.)	Democratic	13,193	98.76%	--unopposed--				13,359	13,027
2008	General	Nov. 4	Frederick Kessler (inc.)	Democratic	20,399	98.92%	--unopposed--				20,622	20,176
2010	General	Nov. 2	Frederick Kessler (inc.)	Democratic	13,758	73.73%	Sam Hagedorn	Rep.	4,868	26.09%	18,661	8,890
2012	Primary	Aug. 14	Frederick Kessler (inc.)	Democratic	1,937	71.48%	Mario R. Hall	Dem.	762	28.12%	2,710	1,175
2012	General	Nov. 6	Frederick Kessler (inc.)	Democratic	16,193	98.59%	--unopposed--				16,425	
2014	General	Nov. 4	Frederick Kessler (inc.)	Democratic	16,494	97.94%	Russell Goodwin (write-in)	Rep.	3	0.02%	16,841	
2016	General	Nov. 8	Frederick Kessler (inc.)	Democratic	18,642	98.42%	--unopposed--				18,941	
2018	Primary	Aug. 14	LaKeshia Myers	Democratic	3,709	59.23%	Frederick Kessler (inc.)	Dem.	2,545	40.64%	6,262	1,164

Wisconsin State Assembly
Preceded by Patrick H. Kelly	Member of the Wisconsin State Assembly from the Milwaukee 10th district January 2, 1961 – January 7, 1963	Succeeded by Patrick H. Kelly
Preceded by Patrick H. Kelly	Member of the Wisconsin State Assembly from the Milwaukee 10th district January 4, 1965 – July 5, 1972	District abolished
Preceded by Shirley Krug	Member of the Wisconsin State Assembly from the 12th district January 3, 2005 – January 1, 2019	Succeeded by LaKeshia Myers
Legal offices
Preceded by Christ T. Seraphim	County Judge of Milwaukee County, Branch 4 July 5, 1972 – July 31, 1978	Office abolished
New circuit	Wisconsin Circuit Court Judge for the Milwaukee Circuit, Branch 23; August 1, 1978 – June 2, 1981	Succeeded by Janine P. Geske
Preceded by Christ T. Seraphim	Wisconsin Circuit Court Judge for the Milwaukee Circuit, Branch 11; August 1, 1986 – February 9, 1988	Succeeded by Dominic S. Amato
