= Louis Fortis =

American politician

Member of the Wisconsin State Assembly from the 11th district
- In office January 5, 1987 – January 4, 1993
- Preceded by: Gus Menos
- Succeeded by: Johnnie E. Morris-Tatum

Personal details
- Born: Louis G. Fortis; April 5, 1947 (age 79) Chicago, Illinois
- Party: Democratic

Louis G. Fortis (born April 5, 1947) is an American economist, educator, and newspaper publisher-editor who served three terms as a Democratic member of the Wisconsin State Assembly from Milwaukee County.

== Background ==
Fortis was born in Chicago, Illinois on April 5, 1947. He earned a B.A. at the University of Wisconsin–Stevens Point in 1969, and went on to earn an M.A. and Ph.D. in economics from the University of Massachusetts. He worked as a high school teacher and VISTA Volunteer, as executive director of the Wisconsin Community Development Finance Authority, and taught economics at Smith College and as an adjunct professor of economic development at the University of Wisconsin–Milwaukee.

== Legislative service ==
In 1986, Fortis, who had been an active member of organizations such as the Wisconsin Partnership for Housing Development, the Wisconsin Cooperative Development Council, Jobs with Peace, and ESHAC, challenged incumbent Democratic State Representative Gus Menos in the 11th Assembly district (Brown Deer, Glendale and portions of northeastern Milwaukee). Menos was dismissed by local newspaper the Milwaukee Journal as "largely ineffective... except when it comes to doing legislative favors for campaign contributors." Fortis won the Democratic primary 3331 votes to 1218 votes for Menos, and the general election, with 9579 votes to 5079 for Republican Katherine Drewes. He was assigned to the standing committees assignments on environmental resources and utilities, serving as vice-chair; on children and human services; on financial institutions and insurance; on housing and securities; and on trade, industry and small business.

He served as a delegate to the 1988 Democratic National Convention pledged to Michael Dukakis; was unopposed for re-election in 1988; and easily won re-election in 1990 against Republican Richard E. Williams.

In 1992, after an extensive redistricting changed the boundaries of his district to include many new areas, he chose to run for the Democratic nomination for the Fourth State Senate District to succeed Barbara Ulichny (who had chosen not to seek re-election in the wake of the investigation into payments to her and other legislators by lobbyist Gary Goyke). He lost the primary to fellow Assembly member Gwen Moore, who drew 11,066 votes to 8,011 for Fortis and 1,254 for Phyllis Williams-Kirk. His seat in the newly revamped 11th Assembly district was taken by Democrat Johnnie Morris-Tatum.

== After the Assembly ==
Since 1997, Fortis has been publisher of the Shepherd Express, an alternative weekly newspaper; since 2000, he has also served as editor.
