= Johnnie E. Morris-Tatum =

American politician

Member of the Wisconsin State Assembly from the 11th district
- In office January 4, 1993 – January 3, 2005
- Preceded by: Louis Fortis
- Succeeded by: Jason Fields

Personal details
- Born: July 9, 1951 (age 75) Milwaukee, Wisconsin
- Party: Democratic

Johnnie Elaine Morris-Tatum (born July 9, 1951), also known as Johnnie Morris, is a Democratic politician from Milwaukee who served as a member of the Wisconsin State Assembly.

== Background ==
Morris-Tatum was born in Milwaukee, and attended West Division High School, Milwaukee Area Technical College, University of Wisconsin–Milwaukee, and Milwaukee Theological Institute. She worked as a mortgage company manager and supervisor, as the director of the Milwaukee Coalition Against Drug and Alcohol Abuse and as the executive director of the Midtown Neighborhood Association, before being elected to the Wisconsin Assembly's 11th district in 1992.

== Career in the Assembly ==
Morris-Tatum was re-elected for four terms, but in 2004 chose to run for the 4th Wisconsin State Senate District seat (being vacated by Gwen Moore), running unsuccessfully against State Representative Lena Taylor (the winner) and Milwaukee County Supervisor James G. White in the Democratic primary. Her successor was Jason Fields.

=== Ethics charges ===
In 2001, local journalist Bruce Murphy accused Morris-Tatum of overcharging for mileage to and from Madison, the State Capital; but no charges were filed. In 2002, Morris-Tatum agreed to pay a $1000 fine for over $12,000 in questionable long distance telephone calls between October 1999 and July 2001, for which she had been reimbursed by the Assembly, including about $6,000 in calls to Senegal. She was still re-elected without opposition in 2002.

== Personal life ==
Morris-Tatum is married and has 2 children. She received a Doctorate of Humanities from Trinity Hall College and Seminary (in Chicago) in 1996 during her time as a legislator. Since leaving the legislature, she has become Milwaukee Director of the Safe Families for Children program.
