= The Shepherd Express =

US newspaper

Shepherd Express
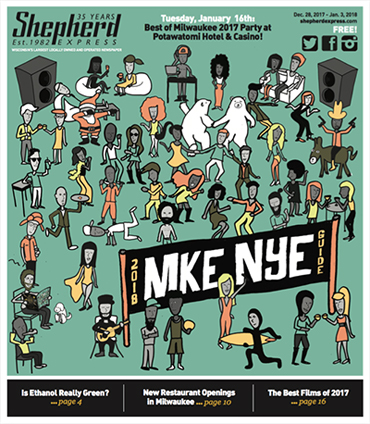
- December 28, 2017 cover of the Shepherd Express
- Type: Alternative weekly
- Format: Magazine
- Owner: Louis Fortis
- Publisher: Louis Fortis
- Editor: Dave Luhrssen
- Founded: 1982
- Headquarters: 207 E. Buffalo Street; Milwaukee, Wisconsin 53202; United States
- Circulation: 64,665
- Website: shepherdexpress.com

The Shepherd Express is an alternative monthly magazine published in Milwaukee, Wisconsin.

== History ==
The paper originated in May 1982 as the Crazy Shepherd, its name derived from a line in Allen Ginsberg's poem "Footnotes to Howl" ("Holy the crazy shepherds of rebellion"). Its founders were a group of University of Wisconsin–Milwaukee students, among them Jeff Hansen, Doug Hissom and Joe Porubcan, who operated it from a series of rented flats near the campus. After appearing sporadically, the Crazy Shepherd eventually settled into a monthly schedule. Several of its founders went on to careers in the news media, including Jim McCarter, publisher of the Metro Times in Detroit; Bill Conroy, editor of the San Antonio Business Journal; and Bill Lueders, news editor at Isthmus in Madison.

Other key co-founders include Jack Gladden, who helped find the money to publish the first edition of the paper; Karen Gerrity and Kurt Buss, who helped to write and edited the early editions; and Jeff Worman, the paper's art director, who penned the science-fictionHourly Why column as well produced the Zeal at Zero cartoons along with illustrations and spoofs.

In 1987 the Shepherd Express was formed in a merger with the Express, a monthly music paper founded in 1979 by Kevn Kinney and David Luhrssen. Kinney went on to form the rock band Drivin’ N’ Cryin’ in Atlanta. Luhrssen returned to the Shepherd Express in late 1994 as arts and entertainment editor, a position he still holds. The Shepherd Express also received national media attention after Timothy W. Maier wrote a series of articles about former Milwaukee Police Officer Lawrencia (Bambi) Bembenek. The series of articles produced new evidence questioning the conviction of one of Wisconsin's most famous inmates.

During the late 1980s to mid-1990s, its publisher was Martin "Marty" Genz and the Genz family were the newspaper's majority stockholders. In 1994, employees arranged for an employee stock ownership plan (ESOP), which resulted in Genz and associate publisher and advertising director Dane Claussen leaving the newspaper and the Genz family selling its ownership stake. The paper was known from 1999 to 2000 as Shepherd Express Metro, after absorbing a short-lived weekly called the Metro. The Shepherd Express has been published since 1997 by Louis Fortis, an economist and former member of the Wisconsin State Assembly. Fortis assumed the role of editor in 2000.
