= Wisconsin's 11th Assembly district =

American legislative district in Milwaukee, Wisconsin

Wisconsin's 11th State Assembly district
- 2024 map defined in 2023 Wisc. Act 94; 2022 map defined in Johnson v. Wisconsin Elections Commission; 2011 map was defined in 2011 Wisc. Act 43
Assemblymember
Sequanna Taylor; D–Milwaukee
since January 6, 2025 (1 years)
- Demographics: 14.48% White; 73.28% Black; 4.46% Hispanic; 7.77% Asian; 1.39% Native American; 0.14% Hawaiian/Pacific Islander
- Population (2020) • Voting age: 59,565; 41,166
- Website: Official website
- Notes: North-central Milwaukee County

The 11th Assembly district of Wisconsin is one of 99 districts in the Wisconsin State Assembly. Located in southeast Wisconsin, the district is entirely contained within north-central Milwaukee County. It comprises parts of the north side of the city of Milwaukee, including the Thurston Woods, Brynwood, Graceland, and Old North Milwaukee. It also contains the Havenwoods State Forest. The district is represented by Democrat Sequanna Taylor, since 2025.

The 11th Assembly district is located within Wisconsin's 4th Senate district, along with the 10th and 12th Assembly districts.

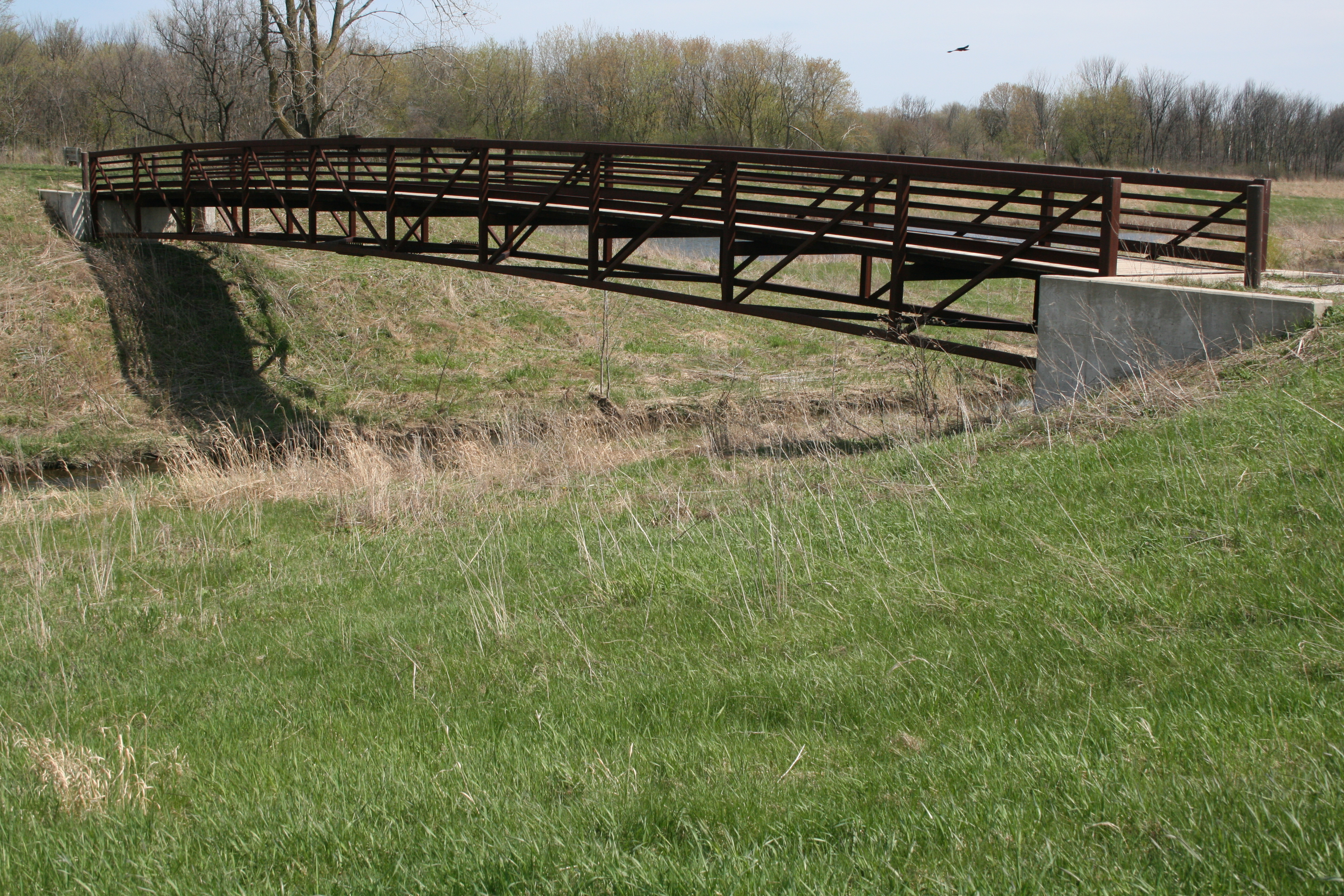
Havenwoods State Forest

== List of past representatives ==
List of representatives to the Wisconsin State Assembly from the 11th district
Member	Party	Residence	Counties represented	Term start	Term end	Ref.
District created
Gus Menos	Dem.	Glendale	Milwaukee County	January 1, 1973	January 3, 1983	
Annette Polly Williams	Dem.	Milwaukee	Milwaukee County	January 3, 1983	January 7, 1985	
Gus Menos	Dem.	Brown Deer	Milwaukee County	January 7, 1985	January 5, 1987	
Louis Fortis	Dem.	Glendale	Milwaukee County	January 5, 1987	January 4, 1993	
Johnnie E. Morris-Tatum	Dem.	Milwaukee	Milwaukee County	January 4, 1993	January 3, 2005	
Jason Fields	Dem.	Milwaukee	Milwaukee County	January 3, 2005	January 7, 2013	
Mandela Barnes	Dem.	Milwaukee	Milwaukee County	January 7, 2013	January 3, 2017	
Jason Fields	Dem.	Milwaukee	Milwaukee County	January 3, 2017	January 4, 2021	
Dora Drake	Dem.	Milwaukee	Milwaukee County	January 4, 2021	December 19, 2024	
--Vacant--			Milwaukee County	December 19, 2024	January 6, 2025	
Sequanna Taylor	Dem.	Milwaukee	Milwaukee County	January 6, 2025	Current	
