= Dora Drake =

21st century American politician

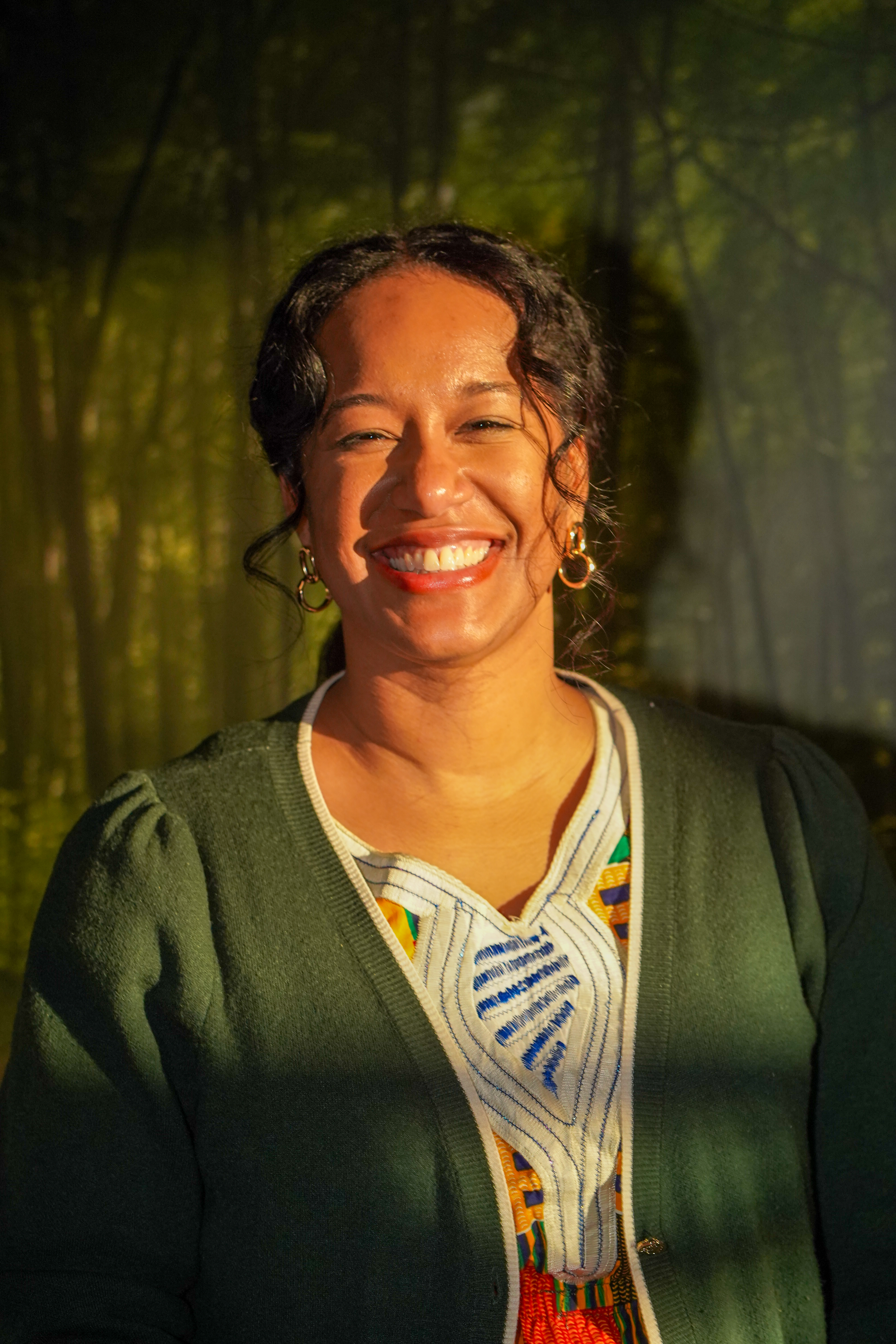
- Drake in 2026

Member of the Wisconsin Senate from the 4th district
- Incumbent
- Assumed office December 19, 2024
- Preceded by: Lena Taylor

Member of the Wisconsin State Assembly from the 11th district
- In office January 4, 2021 – December 19, 2024
- Preceded by: Jason Fields
- Succeeded by: Sequanna Taylor

Personal details
- Born: March 1993 (age 33) Milwaukee, Wisconsin, U.S.
- Party: Democratic
- Education: Marquette University (BA)
- Occupation: politician
- Website: Official website; Campaign website

Dora Elizabeth Drake (born March 1993) is an American community advocate and Democratic politician from Milwaukee, Wisconsin. She is a member of the Wisconsin Senate, representing Wisconsin's 4th Senate district since 2025. She previously served two terms in the Wisconsin State Assembly (2021–2025).

== Early life and education ==
Dora Drake was born and raised in the Graceland neighborhood of Milwaukee, Wisconsin. She attended Eastbrook Academy in neighboring Glendale, Wisconsin, where she graduated in 2011. She was accepted into Marquette University's Educational Opportunities Program and graduated with her bachelor's degree in Social Welfare and Justice in 2015. Shortly after graduating, she was employed by JusticePoint, a nonprofit organization promoting reforms to the criminal justice system and supporting people through their interactions with the justice system.

== Political career ==
Through her involvement in her community, she became involved in local politics and was employed as campaign manager for the 2019 school board campaign of Shyla Deacon. Deacon ultimately fell 27 votes short of her opponent in the spring election.

Following the campaign, Drake was employed at the Center for Self Sufficiency, which assists formerly incarcerated people with family support and reentry services. But a year after the end of the Deacon campaign, Drake announced her own candidacy for Wisconsin State Assembly in the 11th district with the support of Emerge Wisconsin, an organization which recruits, trains, and supports Democratic women running for office in Wisconsin. The 11th district had been represented by Democrat Jason Fields, who had run for Milwaukee city comptroller in the spring election. He announced after losing that election that he would not run for re-election in the Assembly. Three other candidates ultimately also ran in the Democratic primary for this seat, with Drake prevailing with 47% of the vote. Drake prevailed by a wide margin in the general election over Republican candidate Orlando Owens. She was one of 16 new assemblymembers elected in the 2020 election.

In February 2024, Drake announced she would run for Wisconsin Senate in the 4th Senate district, following the resignation of five-term incumbent Lena Taylor. A special election was not called until May, scheduled for July. Drake faced only one opponent for the Senate seat, fellow Democratic state representative LaKeshia Myers. Drake prevailed in the special primary, held July 2, 2024, and was unopposed in the July 30 special election. Drake subsequently won the August 13 Democratic primary for a new four-year term that began in January 2025.

Although entitled to begin her term as senator any time after winning the July 2024 special election, Drake delayed taking office until December 19, 2024, so that she would not have to resign her seat in the Assembly. The tactical timing of Drake's Assembly departure allowed Democrats to prevent Republicans from achieving a brief veto-proof super-majority in the Legislature.

== Personal life and family ==
Dora Drake is the eldest of eight children. She is a worship singer at Milwaukee's New Horizons Integrated Ministries.

== Electoral history ==
=== Wisconsin Assembly (2020, 2022) ===
Year	Election	Date	Elected				Defeated				Total	Plurality
2020	Primary	Aug. 11	Dora Drake	Democratic	2,471	47.32%	Tomika S. Vukovic	Dem.	1,632	31.25%	5,222	839
2020	Primary	Aug. 11	Dora Drake	Democratic	2,471	47.32%	Curtis Cook II	Dem.	824	15.78%	5,222	839
2020	Primary	Aug. 11	Dora Drake	Democratic	2,471	47.32%	Carl Gates	Dem.	287	5.50%	5,222	839
2020	General	Nov. 3	Dora Drake	Democratic	18,329	84.64%	Orlando Owens	Rep.	3,299	15.24%	21,654	15,030
2022	General	Nov. 8	Dora Drake (inc)	Democratic	14,311	99.00%	--unopposed--				14,456	14,166

=== Wisconsin Senate (2024) ===
Year	Election	Date	Elected				Defeated				Total	Plurality
2024 (special)	Primary	Jul. 2	Dora Drake	Democratic	4,439	65.75%	LaKeshia Myers	Dem.	2,298	34.04%	6,751	2,141
2024 (special)	Special	Jul. 30	Dora Drake	Democratic	4,843	96.57%	--Unopposed--				5,015	4,671
2024	Primary	Aug. 13	Dora Drake (inc)	Democratic	12,630	62.35%	LaKeshia Myers	Dem.	7,605	37.54%	20,258	5,025
2024	General	Nov. 5	Dora Drake (inc)	Democratic	67,215	98.45%	--Unopposed--				68,276	

Wisconsin State Assembly
Preceded by Jason Fields	Member of the Wisconsin State Assembly from the 11th district January 4, 2021 – December 19, 2024	Succeeded by Sequanna Taylor
Wisconsin Senate
Preceded by Lena Taylor	Member of the Wisconsin Senate from the 4th district December 19, 2024 – present	Incumbent
