= Gus Menos =

American politician

Member of the Wisconsin State Assembly
- In office January 7, 1985 – January 5, 1987
- Preceded by: Annette Polly Williams
- Succeeded by: Louis Fortis
- Constituency: 11th district
- In office January 3, 1983 – January 7, 1985
- Preceded by: Gervase Hephner
- Succeeded by: Robert Cowles
- Constituency: 6th district
- In office January 1, 1973 – January 3, 1983
- Preceded by: District established
- Succeeded by: Annette Polly Williams
- Constituency: 11th district
- In office September 20, 1971 – January 1, 1973
- Preceded by: Mark Lipscomb Jr.
- Succeeded by: District abolished
- Constituency: Milwaukee 1st district

Personal details
- Born: December 5, 1920 Milwaukee, Wisconsin
- Died: February 14, 1990 (aged 69)
- Party: Democratic

Gus Menos (December 5, 1920 – February 14, 1990) was an American politician and jeweler from Wisconsin.

Born in Milwaukee, Wisconsin, Menos graduated from Lincoln High School and served in the United States Army Air Forces. He worked as a metal finisher and in turbine assembly in a factory, and in air-conditioning service; and was a "lifetime member" of the United Auto Workers union. Menos was a Gemological Institute of America-certified gem appraiser, and owned a jewelry and carpet business.

== Legislative service ==
Menos was elected to the Wisconsin State Assembly in a special election in September 1971 to represent the 1st Milwaukee County District (Ward 6 of the City of Glendale and Ward 1 of the City of Milwaukee) to succeed Democrat Mark Lipscomb, Jr., who had just been elected to the Wisconsin Senate After winning an absolute majority of the votes in a six-way Democratic primary, he defeated Republican Matthew Fausek by 1,651 to 100 in the general election. He was assigned to the standing committees on transportation and on veterans and military affairs.

His district was redistricted in 1971 to include all of Brown Deer, River Hills, and Glendale, and parts of Milwaukee and Whitefish Bay. He was re-elected anyway in what was now the 11th Assembly District, with 10,805 votes to 7,819 for Republican Erwin Schneeberg, and served until 1986. In 1986, condemned by the Milwaukee Journal as "largely ineffective... except when it comes to doing legislative favors for campaign contributors", he lost the Democratic nomination to challenger Louis Fortis by 1218 votes to 3331 for Fortis.
