= Patrick H. Kelly =

American politician (1890–1965)

Patrick Henry Kelly (June 13, 1890 – July 30, 1965) was an American educator and politician, who served two 2-year terms as a Democratic member of the Wisconsin State Assembly from Milwaukee, Wisconsin.

== Background ==
Kelly was born June 13, 1890, in Chicago, and grew up in Cassville, Wisconsin, attending Cassville High School and Middle School. He worked variously as a carpenter, cabinetmaker, private detective, foreman in an automobile factory, superintendent and principal of a mechanical school in Minneapolis, before going into business as a general contractor in 1953. Kelly died on July 30, 1965.

== Elective office ==
Except for serving on his local draft board in 1938, Kelly held no public office before being elected to the Wisconsin State Assembly's Milwaukee County 10th district (the 10th Ward of the City of Milwaukee) in 1958. He challenged eight-term incumbent Democrat Michael F. O'Connell, and defeated him in the Democratic primary by eight votes (737 to 729) in a three-way race. In the general election, facing Republican Herbert Warren Smith as well as O'Connell (now running as an independent), he won with 3997 votes, to 2067 for Smith and 635 for O'Connell. He was assigned to the standing committees on insurance and banking; on taxation; and on third reading.

In 1960, Kelly was himself defeated in a six-way Democratic primary, coming in second to 20-year-old college student Fred Kessler, who took a plurality with 38% of the vote, and went on to defeat Republican Herbert Smith in the general election.

In 1962, Kelly regained his old seat (Kessler was pursuing an unsuccessful run for the Wisconsin State Senate), winning a plurality in a four-way Democratic primary, and defeating Republican Daniel Dawson 3813 to 2185. He was assigned to the same standing committees as in his prior term.

In 1964, Kessler (who had earned a B.A. from the University of Wisconsin-Madison and worked with Governor John W. Reynolds, Jr.'s staff on reapportionment litigation) again unseated Kelly, taking an absolute majority in a five-way Democratic primary: Kelly came in third.
