= Russell Goodwin =

21st century American politician

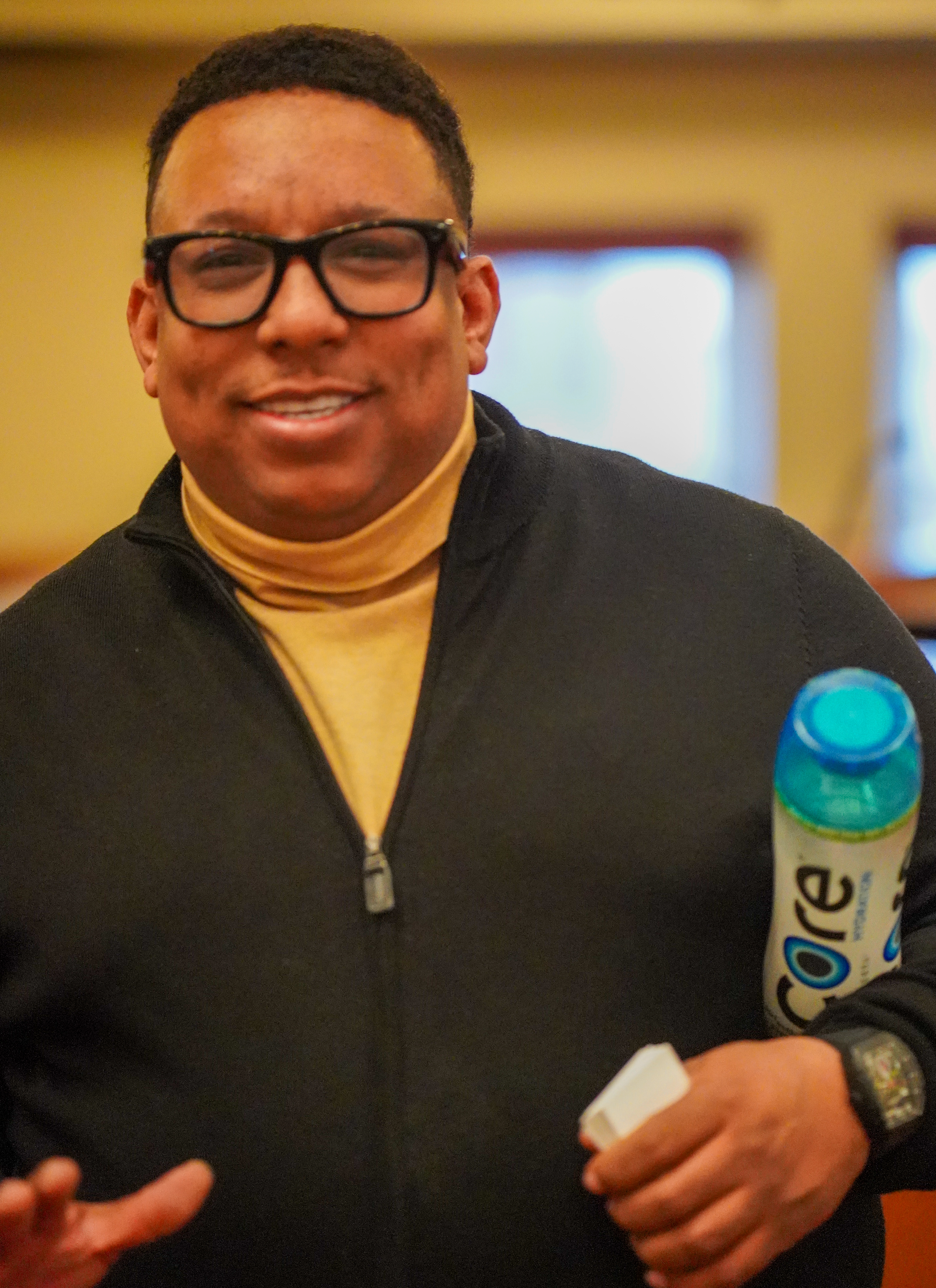
- Goodwin in 2026

Member of the Wisconsin State Assembly from the 12th district
- Incumbent
- Assumed office January 6, 2025
- Preceded by: LaKeshia Myers

Member of the Milwaukee County Board of Supervisors from the 18th district
- In office April 2020 – April 18, 2022
- Preceded by: Deanna Alexander
- Succeeded by: Deanna Alexander

Personal details
- Born: January 3, 1982 (age 44) Milwaukee, Wisconsin, U.S.
- Party: Democratic
- Spouses: Niquelle A. Brimmer (div. 2009); Decorah M. Gordon (div. 2014); Misty Dawn Parker
- Children: 5 with Niquelle Brimmer; 3 stepchildren
- Website: Campaign website

Russell Antonio Goodwin Sr. (born January 3, 1982) is an American pastor and Democratic politician from Milwaukee, Wisconsin. He is a member of the Wisconsin State Assembly, representing Wisconsin's 12th Assembly district since 2025. He previously served on the Milwaukee County Board of Supervisors from 2020 to 2022.

== Early life and career ==
Russell Goodwin was raised in Milwaukee, Wisconsin, graduating from Shorewood High School. Goodwin has authored several religious-themed books, and worked as a music producer. He was a founder of Christians United on the Move Church in Milwaukee, now the Movement Center Church, where he still serves as senior pastor. He received an honorary doctorate in divinity in 2015.

== Political career ==
Goodwin made his first bid for public office in 2014, running for Wisconsin State Assembly in a challenge against incumbent Democrat Fred Kessler, but failed to make the ballot. He then ran a write-in campaign for the Republican primary, but fell short of the 1,000 write-in votes needed to make the general election ballot. He received three write-in votes in the general election.

In 2019, Goodwin announced that he would run for the Milwaukee County Board of Supervisors, to succeed supervisor Deanna Alexander, who was not running for re-election. In announcing his campaign, Goodwin said he would dedicate his campaign to the memory of Pastor Silvia Hughes-Twari, who had been killed by a vehicle that was fleeing from Milwaukee police. He was elected without opposition.

In seeking re-election in 2022, Goodwin failed to collect enough valid signatures to appear on the ballot for county board. A number of signatures were disqualified because the signers did not reside in his county board district; Goodwin also suggested that door-to-door signature collection was hampered by the ongoing COVID-19 pandemic. Fortunately for Goodwin, however, no other candidate had planned to run against him, leaving the seat open to a write-in contest. Goodwin sought re-election via write-in, but was defeated by the write-in campaign of his predecessor, Deanna Alexander. In the days after the election, Goodwin initially called for protests at Alexander's home over previous statements that he characterized as racist and anti-LGBT, but later canceled the planned protest.

In December 2022, Goodwin announced a run for Milwaukee Common Council, to succeed Chantia Lewis who had been removed from office as part of a plea agreement. Ultimately seven other candidates also entered the race. Goodwin finished fourth in the nonpartisan primary, behind Odell Ball, the husband of Milwaukee County sheriff Denita Ball, and Milwaukee Public Schools teachers Larresa Taylor and Amber Danyus.

In early 2024, state representative LaKeshia Myers, who had succeeded Fred Kessler in the 12th Assembly district, announced she would forgo re-election in order to run for Wisconsin Senate. Goodwin announced he would seek the Democratic Party's nomination to succeed Myers in the State Assembly. In the overwhelmingly Democratic district, Goodwin won the primary with just 32.6% of the vote. In the general election, Goodwin faced a rematch with his 2022 county board opponent, Deanna Alexander, who was running as an independent. Goodwin easily prevailed in this election, however, receiving over 80% of the vote.

Goodwin was sworn in on January 6, 2025.

In March 2025, Goodwin voted with Republicans on a bill that would allow police to impound and tow vehicles used for reckless driving. The law would also expand the law to include reckless drivers who do not own the vehicle being impounded or towed, while owners of stolen vehicles will not have to pay any fees for impoundment or towing. Later that month, Goodwin voted alongside Republicans to restrict transgender female students from participating in sports based on their gender identity. In October, Goodwin supported legislation which would require drivers with reckless driving offenses to install speed limiting devices in their vehicles.

== Personal life and family ==
Russell Goodwin was first married to Niquelle Brimmer. The two of them had three children. Their marriage ended in 2009. He later had a brief marriage to Decorah M. Gordon, which ended in 2013. Russell is currently married to Misty Dawn Parker and is the stepfather to her three children.

== Electoral history ==
=== Wisconsin Assembly (2014) ===
Year	Election	Date	Elected				Defeated				Total	Plurality
2014	General	Nov. 4	Fred Kessler (inc.)	Democratic	16,494	97.94%	Russell Goodwin (write-in)	Rep.	3	0.02%	16,841	16,491

=== Wisconsin Assembly (2024, 2026) ===
Year	Election	Date	Elected				Defeated				Total	Plurality
2024	Primary	Aug. 13	Russell A. Goodwin	Democratic	1,705	32.66%	Brandon Williford	Dem.	1,529	29.29%	5,221	310
2024	Primary	Aug. 13	Russell A. Goodwin	Democratic	1,705	32.66%	Katrina Blossom Morrison	Dem.	1,395	26.72%	5,221	310
2024	Primary	Aug. 13	Russell A. Goodwin	Democratic	1,705	32.66%	Decorah Gordon (withdrawn)	Dem.	573	10.97%	5,221	310
2024	General	Nov. 5	Russell A. Goodwin	Democratic	18,391	80.46%	Deanna Alexander	Ind.	4,331	18.95%	22,856	14,060
2026	Primary	Aug. 11	Russell A. Goodwin (inc)	Democratic	3,746	53.89%	Jordan Roman	Dem.	3,184	45.81%	6,951	562

Wisconsin State Assembly
Preceded by LaKeshia Myers	Member of the Wisconsin State Assembly from the 12th district January 6, 2025 – present	Incumbent
