= Sequanna Taylor =

21st century American politician

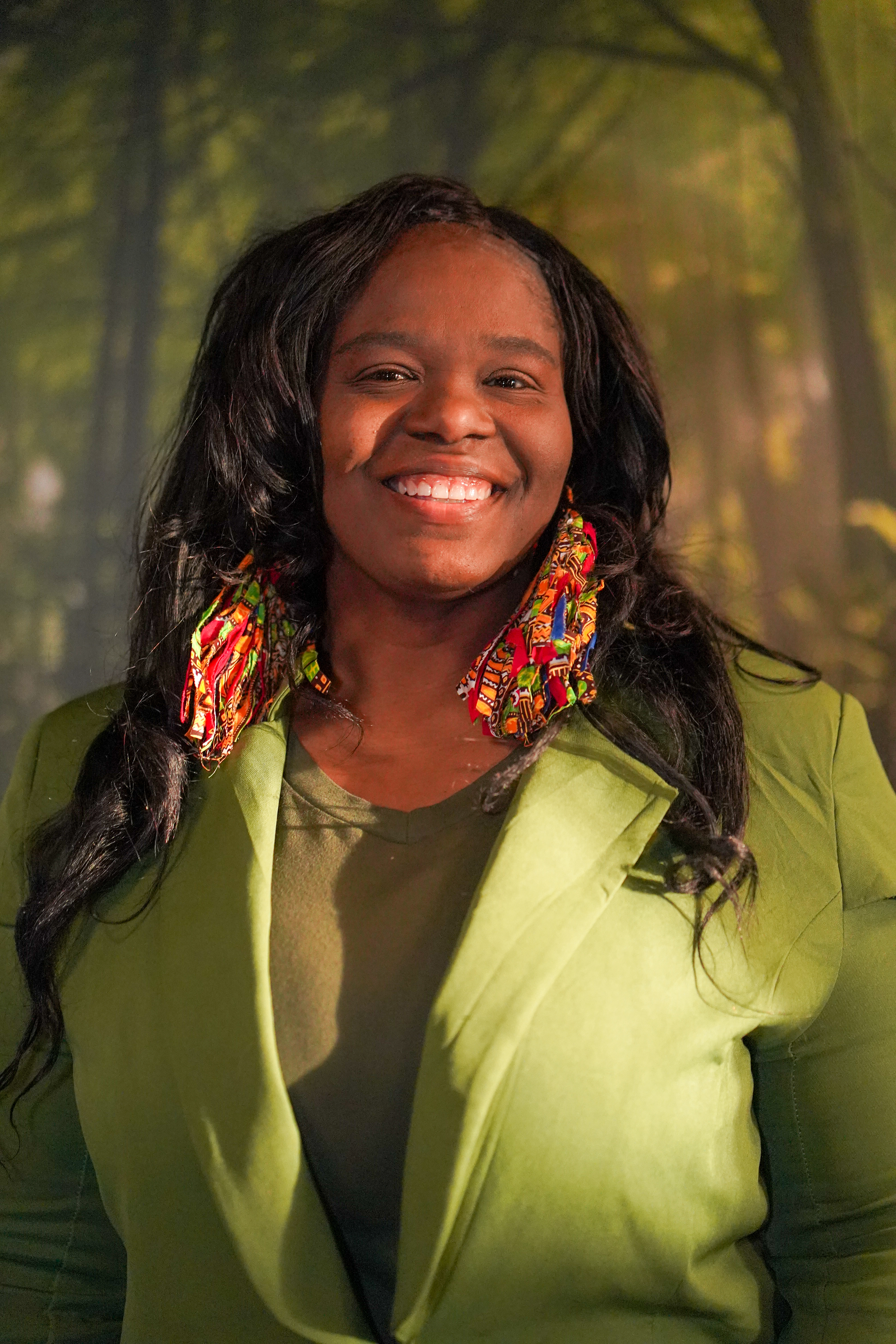
- Taylor in 2026

Member of the Wisconsin State Assembly from the 11th district
- Incumbent
- Assumed office January 6, 2025
- Preceded by: Dora Drake

Member of the Milwaukee County Board of Supervisors
- In office April 2022 – April 20, 2026
- Preceded by: Marcelia Nicholson
- Succeeded by: Leevan D. Roundtree Jr.
- Constituency: 5th district
- In office April 2016 – April 2022
- Preceded by: Khalif Rainey
- Succeeded by: Willie Johnson Jr.
- Constituency: 2nd district

Personal details
- Born: July 29, 1979 (age 46) Milwaukee, Wisconsin, U.S.
- Party: Democratic
- Spouse: divorced
- Children: 4
- Education: Concordia University Wisconsin; Cardinal Stritch University
- Website: Official website (Assembly); Official website (County)

Sequanna Taylor (born July 1979) is an American educator, community organizer, and Democratic politician from Milwaukee, Wisconsin. She is a member of the Wisconsin State Assembly, representing Wisconsin's 11th Assembly district since 2025. She is also currently a member of the Milwaukee County Board of Supervisors, since 2016, and a former member of the board of the Milwaukee Public Schools.

== Biography ==
Sequanna Taylor was born, raised, and has lived most of her life in Milwaukee, Wisconsin. She grew up in the Amani neighborhood, on Milwaukee's northwest side. She was the first member of her family to graduate from high school and college.

She worked for 15 years in the Milwaukee Public Schools as a coordinator for the parents of special needs students. She attended college at night while working and raising her children, earning her associate's degree from Concordia University Wisconsin, and then her bachelor's degree from Cardinal Stritch University. Through her work in Milwaukee schools, she became active in the teachers' union, the Milwaukee Teachers' Education Association, and eventually became a member of the union leadership and a member of the board of directors of the National Education Association.

== Political career ==
In 2016, Taylor made her first bid for public office, running for Milwaukee County Board of Supervisors in the 2nd district seat being vacated by Khalif Rainey. She has been re-elected every two years since then, though she was redistricted to the 5th county board district in 2022. In 2019, she also won a seat on the board of education of the Milwaukee Public Schools, and served a four year term in that role.

In 2023, state representative Dora Drake announced she would forgo re-election to run instead for Wisconsin Senate. Just after winning her fifth term on the county board, in April 2024, Taylor announced that she would run to succeed Drake in the 11th district of the Wisconsin State Assembly. No Republican ran in the 11th district, which was overwhelmingly Democratic, but Taylor faced a contested Democratic primary against Milwaukee graduate student Amillia Heredia. Taylor won the primary with over 83% of the vote, and won the general election without opposition.

Taylor was sworn in on January 6, 2025.

In October 2025, Taylor, alongside fellow freshman representative Amaad Rivera-Wagner proposed the creation of a "purple alert" to alert authorities about potential victims of domestic abuse to prevent further abuse. In December 2025, Taylor proposed legislation to ensure that all facilities operated by the Wisconsin Department of Transportation be fully compliant with the Americans with Disabilities Act of 1990 by 2030.

== Personal life and family ==
While in high school, Taylor became romantically involved with an older man, and eventually married him. They had two children together before divorcing. Taylor alleged that he had been emotionally abusive.

In 2022, Taylor received an honorary doctorate degree from Trinity International University, in the field of entrepreneurship and business administration.

== Electoral history ==
=== Wisconsin Assembly (2024) ===
Year	Election	Date	Elected				Defeated				Total	Plurality
2024	Primary	Aug. 13	Sequanna Taylor	Democratic	3,927	83.25%	Amillia Heredia	Dem.	774	16.41%	4,717	3,153
2024	General	Nov. 5	Sequanna Taylor	Democratic	20,392	98.77%	--unopposed--				20,646	20,138

Wisconsin State Assembly
Preceded by Dora Drake	Member of the Wisconsin State Assembly from the 11th district January 6, 2025 – present	Incumbent
