= LaKeshia Myers =

21st century American politician

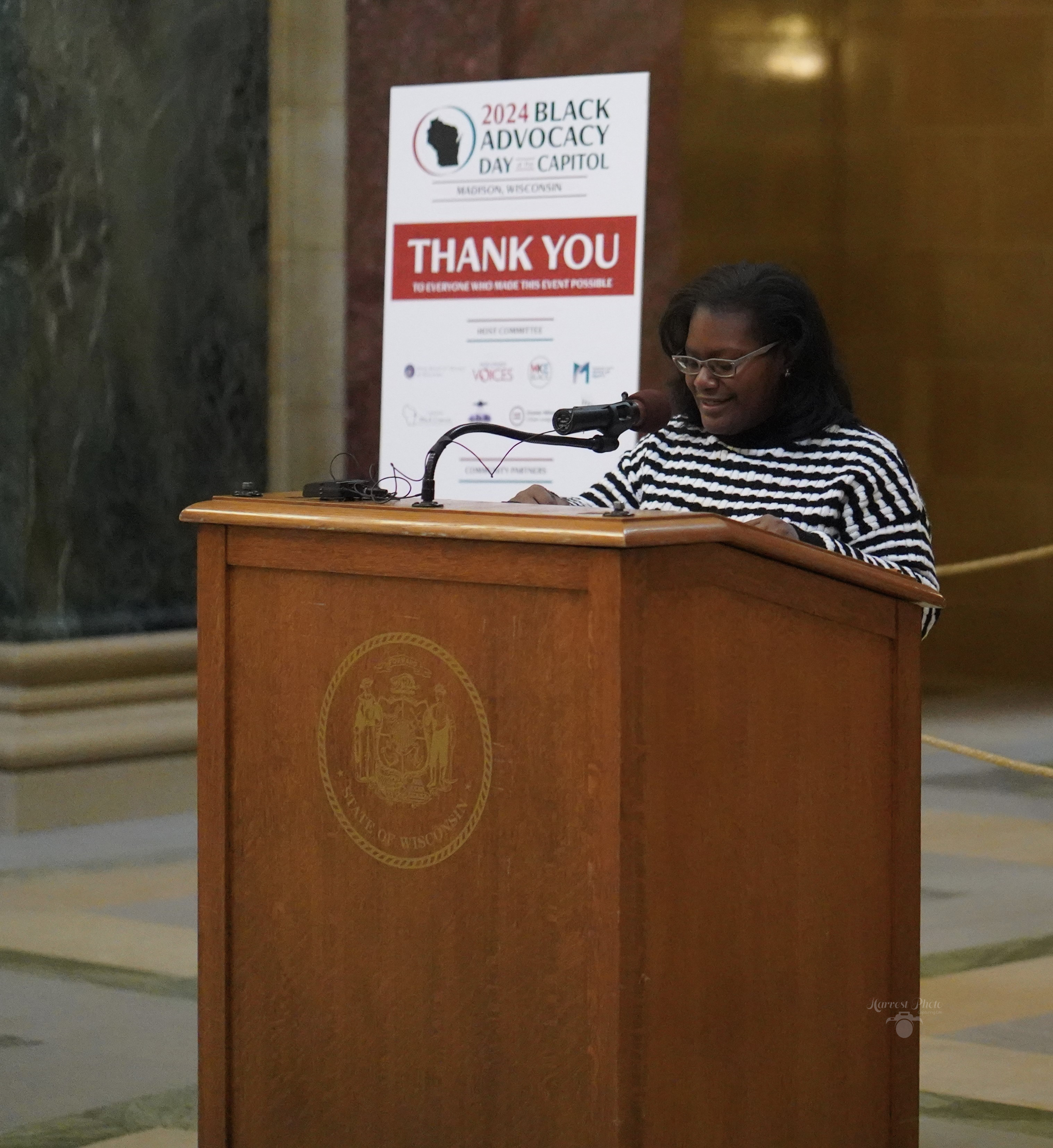
- Myers speaking during 2024 Black Advocacy Day at the Capitol, February 29, 2024

Member of the Wisconsin State Assembly from the 12th district
- In office January 6, 2019 – January 6, 2025
- Preceded by: Fred Kessler
- Succeeded by: Russell Goodwin

Personal details
- Born: May 21, 1984 (age 42) Milwaukee, Wisconsin
- Party: Democratic
- Education: Alcorn State University (BA); Strayer University (EdM); Argosy University (EdD)
- Website: Official website

LaKeshia N. Myers (born May 21, 1984) is an American educator and Democratic politician from Milwaukee, Wisconsin. She served three terms as a member of the Wisconsin State Assembly, representing Wisconsin's 12th Assembly district from 2019 to 2025.

== Early life and education ==
Myers was born in Milwaukee, Wisconsin, and graduated from Rufus King High School in 2002. She received a Bachelor of Arts degree from Alcorn State University in 2006 (from 2005 to 2006 she was National Membership Director of College Democrats of America), a Master of Education from Strayer University in 2009, and a doctor of education from Argosy University in 2016. In addition to working as Director of Education for the Wisconsin Department of Corrections and a trainer of teachers at Milwaukee Public Schools, she has been a small business owner, a clerk for the United States House of Representatives, and a legislative aide for Wisconsin State Senator Lena Taylor. She is a member of Alpha Kappa Alpha sorority.

== Wisconsin State Assembly ==
In 2012, after a drastic redistricting by the Republican-controlled legislature removed his home from the 12th and changed the racial complexion completely, Kessler (who had served in the Assembly on and off since 1961) faced a challenge in the Democratic primary from African-American newcomer Mario Hall, who was reported to be a school choice supporter with backing from pro-voucher organizations. Kessler (who had to move into the redrawn district) won with 71% of the vote, and faced no challenger in the November general election. Kessler was re-elected without opposition in 2014 and 2016.

In 2018, Myers, who has been active in various African-American and other civic organizations, announced her candidacy, saying that she ran because "neglect and starvation" had hurt Wisconsin's educational system, advocating that fewer people be re-imprisoned for minor probation and parole violations, and denouncing what she called the district's economic decline. Kessler has been a frequent critic of Milwaukee County Executive Chris Abele on issues from privatization of Milwaukee public schools to the public subsidies which financed the Fiserv Forum; and the Leadership MKE political action fund (financed almost completely by Abele) reported spending over $57,000 in support of Myers' candidacy. In the primary she defeated the 78-year-old Kessler with 3,709 votes to his 2,545. Afterwards, she told the Associated Press, "I think the district made their voices clear with, it's time for us to cash in on that seat by having someone, a person of color, represent us in this district." She drew 17,428 votes in the general election, with only 274 write-in votes against her.

Myers left her State Assembly seat to run for the Wisconsin Senate, following incumbent Lena Taylor's appointment as a Milwaukee County judge. She lost to Dora Drake in the Democratic primaries for both the special election to fill the seat in 2024 and the general election for the following term.

== Electoral history ==
=== Wisconsin Assembly (2018–2022) ===
Year	Election	Date	Elected				Defeated				Total	Plurality
2018	Primary	Aug. 14	LaKeshia Myers	Democratic	3,709	59.23%	Fred Kessler (inc.)	Dem.	2,545	40.64%	6,262	1,164
2018	General	Nov. 6	LaKeshia Myers	Democratic	17,428	97.01%	--unopposed--				17,702	17,154
2020	General	Nov. 3	LaKeshia Myers (inc)	Democratic	18,539	70.17%	Ozell Cox	Rep.	4,117	18.14%	22,699	14,422
2022	General	Nov. 8	LaKeshia Myers (inc)	Democratic	13,770	78.79%	Greg Canady	Rep.	3,688	21.10%	17,476	10,082

=== Wisconsin Senate (2024) ===
Year	Election	Date	Elected				Defeated				Total	Plurality
2024 (special)	Primary	Jul. 2	Dora Drake	Democratic	4,439	65.75%	LaKeshia Myers	Dem.	2,298	34.04%	6,751	2,141
2024	Primary	Aug. 13	Dora Drake (inc)	Democratic	12,630	62.35%	LaKeshia Myers	Dem.	7,605	37.54%	20,258	5,025
