= Jason Fields =

21st century American politician, Wisconsin State Assembly

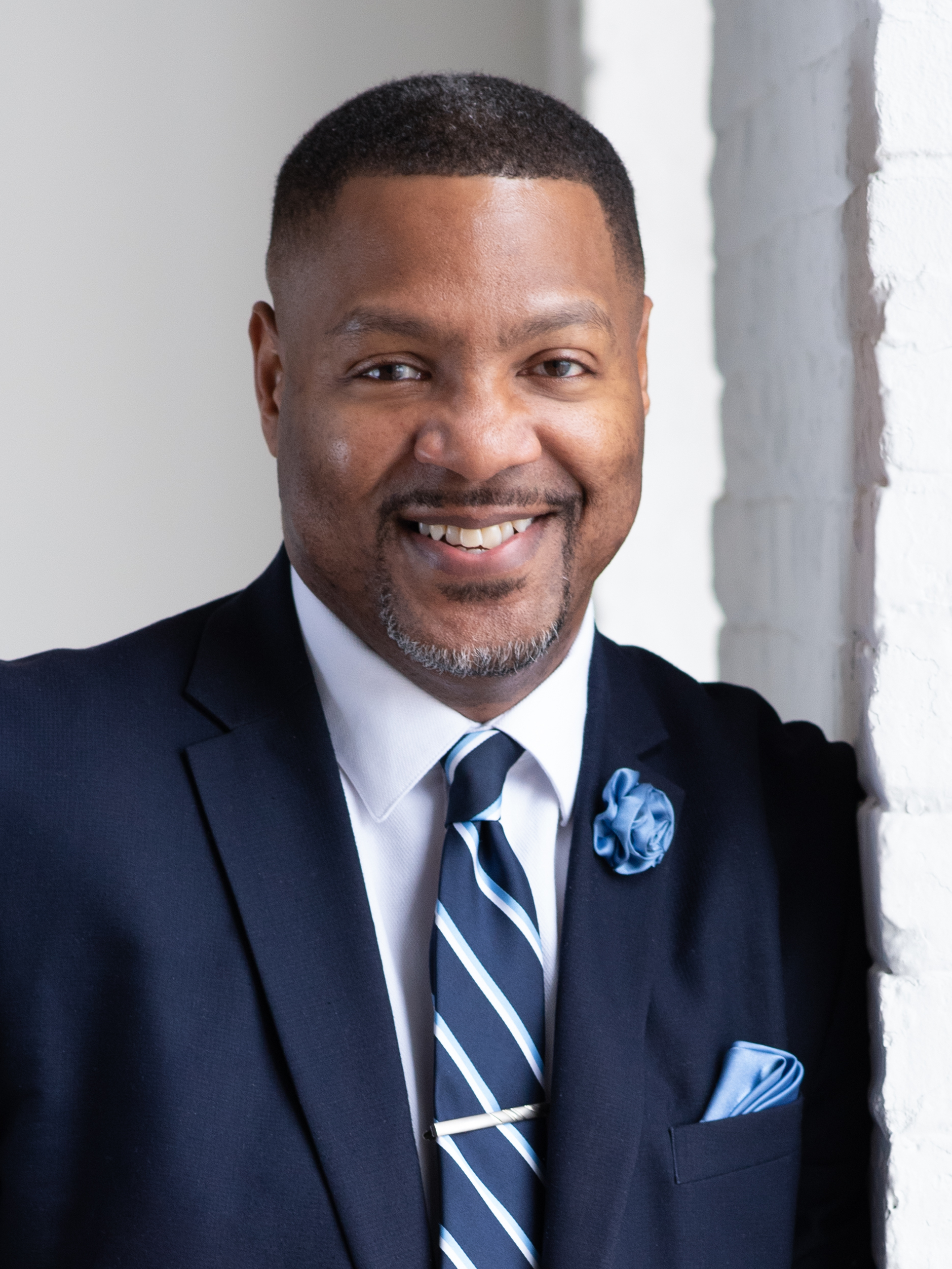
- Fields in 2022

Member of the Wisconsin State Assembly from the 11th district
- In office January 3, 2017 – January 4, 2021
- Preceded by: Mandela Barnes
- Succeeded by: Dora Drake
- In office January 3, 2005 – January 7, 2013
- Preceded by: Johnnie E. Morris-Tatum
- Succeeded by: Mandela Barnes

Personal details
- Born: January 29, 1974 (age 52) Milwaukee, Wisconsin, U.S.
- Party: Democratic
- Spouse: La Tasha
- Education: Cardinal Stritch University (B.S., 2014)
- Profession: Finance
- Salary: $52,999
- Website: State Assembly website Personal twitter

Jason M. Fields (born January 29, 1974) is an American politician, and a former stockbroker, financial advisor, and banker from Milwaukee, Wisconsin. He was a Democratic member of the Wisconsin State Assembly for six terms (2005–2013 & 2017–2021). Fields ran for Milwaukee City Comptroller, the city's top financial job, in the 2020 spring election, but lost narrowly.

== Background ==
Jason Fields was born in Milwaukee on January 29, 1974, to Johnie Fields Jr and Debra Fields. He graduated from Milwaukee Lutheran High School in 1992. He worked as a stockbroker, financial advisor, and banker, and is a certified financial education instructor. He returned to school as an adult, earning his Bachelor's degree in Business Management from Milwaukee's Cardinal Stritch University in 2014. He is a member of the Prince Hall Masons, the Alpha Phi Alpha fraternity, the Independent Order of Odd Fellows, the Elks Lodge of Milwaukee #46, and the International Society of Business Leaders.

== Public office ==
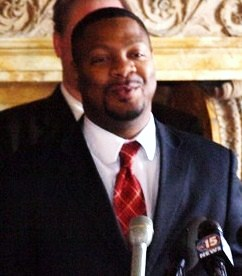
Fields in 2010

Fields, who had served as Fourth Congressional District Chairman of the Wisconsin Democratic Party and held other party office, was first elected to the Assembly in 2004, and was thrice reelected from 2006-2010). His committee assignments included those on financial institutions (which he chaired during the 2009-2011 session); insurance; jobs, economy and small business, education reform; transportation; ways and means, workforce development, economic development; and urban and local affairs.

=== 2012 Primary Defeat ===
In 2012, he lost his bid for reelection in the Democratic primary, losing to Mandela Barnes, son of a public school teacher, who had made major issues of Fields's support for the school voucher program, and Fields’s opposition to limiting interest rates charged by payday loan companies whose charges can exceed a 500% annual percentage rate. (Fields's brother Jarett, who was a candidate for the Democratic nomination in the nearby 19th District, was also defeated.) Fields was one of two veteran Milwaukee-area Democratic incumbents (the other being Peggy Krusick) to be unseated in that August primary by challengers who argued that the incumbent was too moderate to represent the district properly.

=== 2016 Return ===
In 2016, Barnes announced he would challenge incumbent Lena Taylor in a Democratic primary for her seat in the Wisconsin State Senate. This left an opening in the 11th Assembly District, and Fields decided to run again for his old seat. He defeated Milwaukee community organizer Darrol D. Gibson in the Democratic primary and was unopposed in the general election.

=== 2020 Comptroller election ===
In 2020, Fields announced he would run for election as Milwaukee City Comptroller. He topped the field in the February primary election, taking 43% of the vote, but was narrowly defeated in the general election by deputy comptroller Aycha Sawa. Fields made an issue of Sawa's handling of an audit of lead piping which was rated as exaggerated and misleading. The comptroller election was one of several Wisconsin elections significantly impacted by the 2020 COVID-19 pandemic in Wisconsin.

=== Leaving office ===
On May 12, 2020, Fields filed paperwork with the Wisconsin Elections Commission declaring he would not be a candidate for re-election in 2020. He also released a press release confirming the decision, stating, "After much consideration about the future, and conversations with my dear wife, La Tasha Fields, I have decided to not seek re-election to the Wisconsin State Assembly, District 11."

== Electoral history ==
=== Wisconsin Assembly (2004, 2006, 2008, 2010) ===
Wisconsin Assembly, 11th District Election, 2004
Party	Candidate	Votes	%	±%
Democratic Primary Election, September 14, 2004
Democratic	Jason Fields	2,793	45.16%	
Democratic	Leonard Goudy	2,172	35.12%	
Democratic	Jim Malloy	1,173	18.97%	
	Scattering	46	0.74%	
Total votes		6,184	100.0%	
General Election, November 2, 2004
Democratic	Jason Fields	19,625	99.37%	+0.62%
	Scattering	124	0.63%	
Plurality		19,501	98.74%	+1.23%
Total votes		19,749	100.0%	+106.34%
Democratic hold				

Wisconsin Assembly, 11th District Election, 2006
Party	Candidate	Votes	%	±%
General Election, November 7, 2006
Democratic	Jason Fields (incumbent)	11,626	99.42%	+0.05%
	Scattering	68	0.58%	
Plurality		11,558	98.84%	+0.09%
Total votes		11,694	100.0%	-40.79%
Democratic hold				

Wisconsin Assembly, 11th District Election, 2008
Party	Candidate	Votes	%	±%
General Election, November 4, 2008
Democratic	Jason Fields (incumbent)	21,083	99.24%	−0.18%
	Scattering	162	0.76%	
Plurality		20,921	98.47%	-0.36%
Total votes		21,245	100.0%	+81.67%
Democratic hold				

Wisconsin Assembly, 11th District Election, 2010
Party	Candidate	Votes	%	±%
General Election, November 2, 2010
Democratic	Jason Fields (incumbent)	14,860	99.10%	−0.14%
	Scattering	135	0.90%	
Plurality		14,725	98.20%	-0.28%
Total votes		14,995	100.0%	-29.42%
Democratic hold				

=== Wisconsin Assembly (2012) ===
Wisconsin Assembly, 11th District Election, 2012
Party	Candidate	Votes	%	±%
Democratic Primary Election, August 14, 2012
Democratic	Mandela Barnes	2,596	68.14%	
Democratic	Jason Fields (incumbent)	1,206	31.65%	
	Scattering	8	0.21%	
Total votes		3,810	100.0%	
General Election, November 6, 2012
Democratic	Mandela Barnes	16,403	98.79%	−0.31%
	Scattering	201	1.21%	
Plurality		16,202	97.58%	-0.62%
Total votes		16,604	100.0%	+10.73%
Democratic hold				

=== Wisconsin Assembly (2016, 2018) ===
Wisconsin Assembly, 11th District Election, 2016
Party	Candidate	Votes	%	±%
Democratic Primary Election, August 9, 2016
Democratic	Jason Fields	2,933	58.47%	
Democratic	Darrol D. Gibson	2,063	41.13%	
	Scattering	20	0.40%	
Total votes		5,016	100.0%	
General Election, November 8, 2016
Democratic	Jason Fields	18,418	98.76%	−0.07%
	Scattering	232	1.24%	
Plurality		18,186	97.51%	-0.14%
Total votes		18,650	100.0%	+6.36%
Democratic hold				

Wisconsin Assembly, 11th District Election, 2018
Party	Candidate	Votes	%	±%
General Election, November 6, 2018
Democratic	Jason Fields (incumbent)	17,162	98.75%	
	Scattering	218	1.25%	
Plurality		16,944	97.49%	-0.02%
Total votes		17,380	100.0%	-6.81%
Democratic hold				

=== Milwaukee Comptroller (2020) ===
Milwaukee City Comptroller Election, 2020
Party	Candidate	Votes	%	±%
Primary Election, February 18, 2020
Nonpartisan	Jason Fields	25,305	42.98%	
Nonpartisan	Aycha Sawa	17,913	30.42%	
Nonpartisan	Alex Brower	15,248	25.90%	
	Scattering	412	0.70%	
Total votes		58,878	100.0%	
General Election, April 7, 2020
Nonpartisan	Aycha Sawa	41,297	50.40%	
Nonpartisan	Jason Fields	40,299	49.18%	
	Scattering	347	0.42%	
Plurality		998	1.22%	
Total votes		81,943	100.0%	

Wisconsin State Assembly
Preceded by Johnnie E. Morris-Tatum	Member of the Wisconsin State Assembly from the 11th district 2005 – 2013	Succeeded by Mandela Barnes
Preceded by Mandela Barnes	Member of the Wisconsin State Assembly from the 11th district 2017 – 2021	Succeeded by Dora Drake
