= Mandela Barnes =

American politician (born 1986)

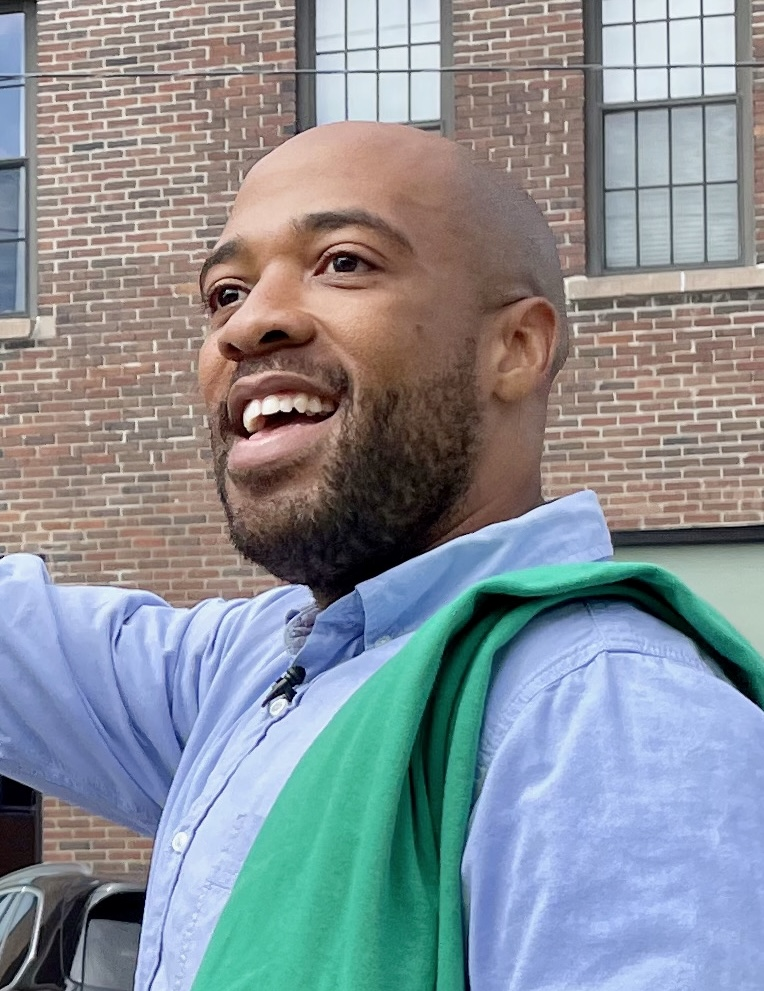
- Barnes in 2022

45th Lieutenant Governor of Wisconsin
- In office January 7, 2019 – January 3, 2023
- Governor: Tony Evers
- Preceded by: Rebecca Kleefisch
- Succeeded by: Sara Rodriguez

Member of the Wisconsin State Assembly from the 11th district
- In office January 7, 2013 – January 3, 2017
- Preceded by: Jason Fields
- Succeeded by: Jason Fields

Personal details
- Born: Jesse Mandela Barnes; December 1, 1986 (age 39) Milwaukee, Wisconsin, U.S.
- Party: Democratic
- Education: Alabama A&M University (BA)
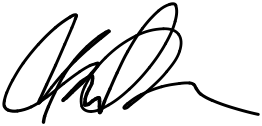
- Signature
- Website: Campaign website

J. Mandela Barnes (born Jesse Mandela Barnes; December 1, 1986) is an American politician who served as the 45th lieutenant governor of Wisconsin from 2019 to 2023. A member of the Democratic Party, he was the state representative for Wisconsin's 11th Assembly district from 2013 to 2017. Barnes was the first African American to serve as Wisconsin's lieutenant governor.

Barnes was the Democratic nominee in the 2022 United States Senate election in Wisconsin, losing to incumbent Republican Senator Ron Johnson. He also ran in the Democratic primary for governor of Wisconsin in 2026, dropping out two weeks before the primary election.

== Early life and education ==
J. Mandela Barnes was born in Milwaukee on December 1, 1986, the son of a public school teacher and a United Auto Workers member. Jesse is his father's name, while his middle name, Mandela, is a tribute to the anti-apartheid activist and first South African black president Nelson Mandela. Barnes says he has used his middle name since birth. His legal name is J. Mandela Barnes.

Barnes attended Holy Redeemer Christian Academy in Milwaukee and graduated from John Marshall High School. He attended Alabama A&M University from 2003 to 2008, where he was a member of the Kappa Alpha Psi fraternity and was involved with the National Association for the Advancement of Colored People (NAACP). He has said that the 2004 Democratic National Convention keynote address by Barack Obama inspired him to rethink his post-college career.

In August 2019, Barnes admitted that he had never officially completed his bachelor's degree in 2008 due to incomplete coursework in one class that he called a "minor technical issue", contrary to previous statements that he had graduated from Alabama A&M. He received his Bachelor of Arts degree in communications media specializing in performance on May 1, 2020, after resolving the outstanding coursework issue with the university.

== Political career ==
Barnes worked for various political campaigns and in the office of Milwaukee mayor Tom Barrett, eventually becoming an organizer for M.I.C.A.H., a Milwaukee-based interfaith coalition that advocates social justice. He served as deputy director of strategic engagement for State Innovation Exchange, a national progressive public policy organization based in Madison, from December 2016 to December 2017.

Barnes is a progressive Democrat and voted for Bernie Sanders in the 2016 and 2020 Wisconsin presidential primaries.

=== Wisconsin State Assembly (2013–2017) ===
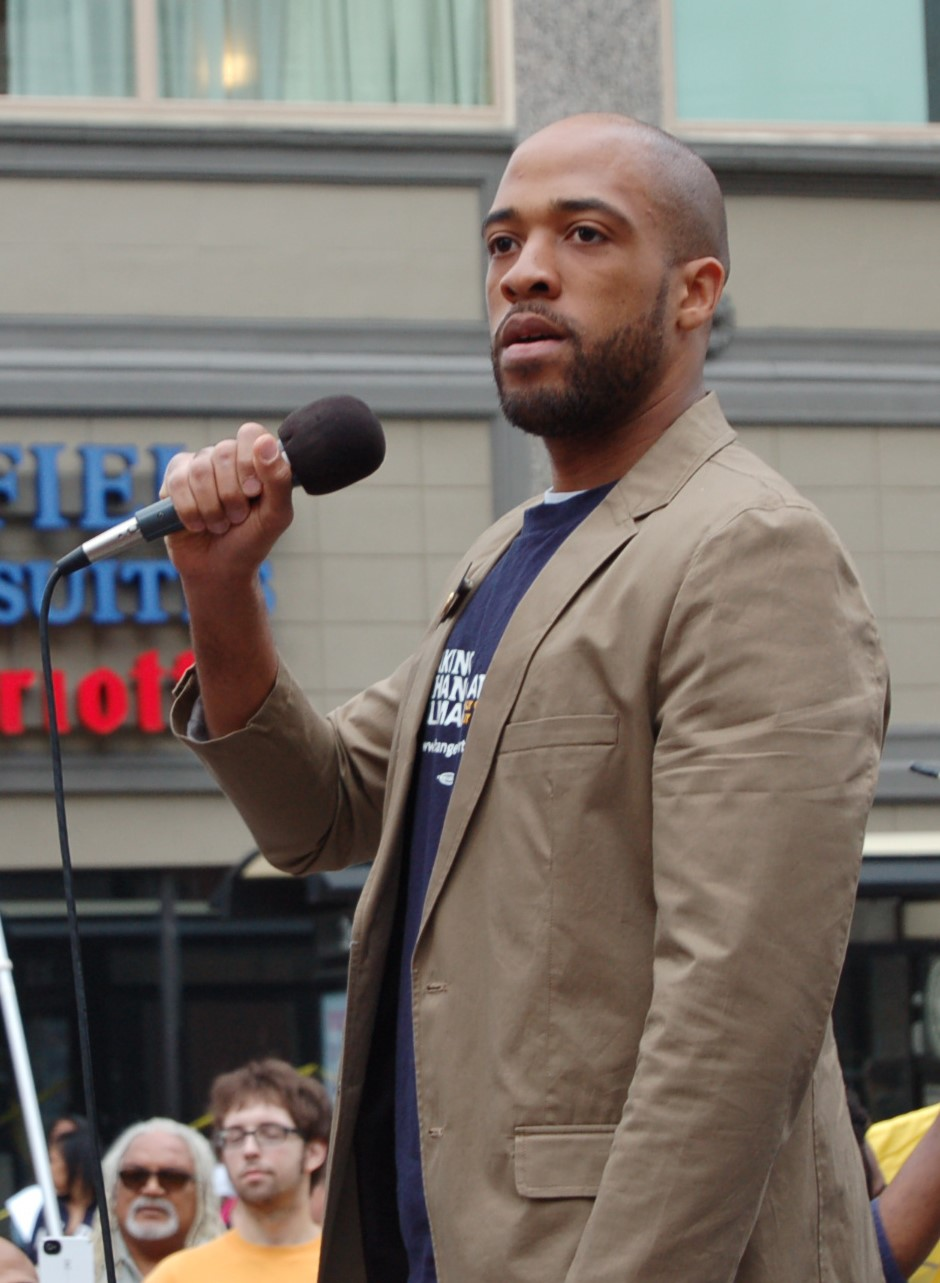
Barnes in 2013

In April 2012, Barnes announced his candidacy for Wisconsin's 11th Assembly district, representing the north side of Milwaukee and a small part of Wauwatosa, challenging incumbent Jason Fields in the Democratic primary election. His campaign made major issues of Fields's support for the school voucher program and opposition to limiting interest rates charged by payday loan companies, which can exceed a 500% annual percentage rate.

Barnes defeated Fields in the August 2012 primary with 2,596 votes to Fields's 1,206. In the November general election Barnes was unopposed. He received 16,403 votes to 201 votes for others.

As a state legislator in 2013, Barnes sponsored a bill that would have banned assault weapons and high-capacity magazines. Barnes was reelected in 2014 without a primary or general election challenge.

Barnes sponsored a 2016 bill to eliminate cash bail. It would have barred judges from considering the "nature, number and gravity" of the charges and required the release of a defendant unless there was "clear and convincing evidence" of flight risk or of danger to an individual or witness. In February 2022, his campaign told the Milwaukee Journal Sentinel that Barnes still supported the proposal, and if elected to the Senate, he would support a bill to end cash bail nationwide.

Barnes served on the Assembly Committees on Corrections, Education, Jobs & the Economy, and Small Business Development. He also chaired the legislature's Black and Latino Caucus, and helped lead a number of international delegations to the Middle East and southeast Asia.

=== 2016 Wisconsin Senate campaign ===
On April 11, 2016, Barnes announced that he would resign from the Assembly to launch a primary challenge against Lena Taylor, the Democratic incumbent in Wisconsin's 4th State Senate district. Political science professor and former State Senator Mordecai Lee expressed surprise, noting both the rarity of Democratic Senate primaries and Wisconsin's 90% reelection rate for incumbents. Lee framed the race as reflecting the broader struggle in the Democratic Party, pitting a young progressive challenger against an older, more centrist incumbent. Barnes lost to Taylor in the August 9 election, with 7,433 votes to Taylor's 11,454.

=== Lieutenant governor of Wisconsin (2019–2023) ===
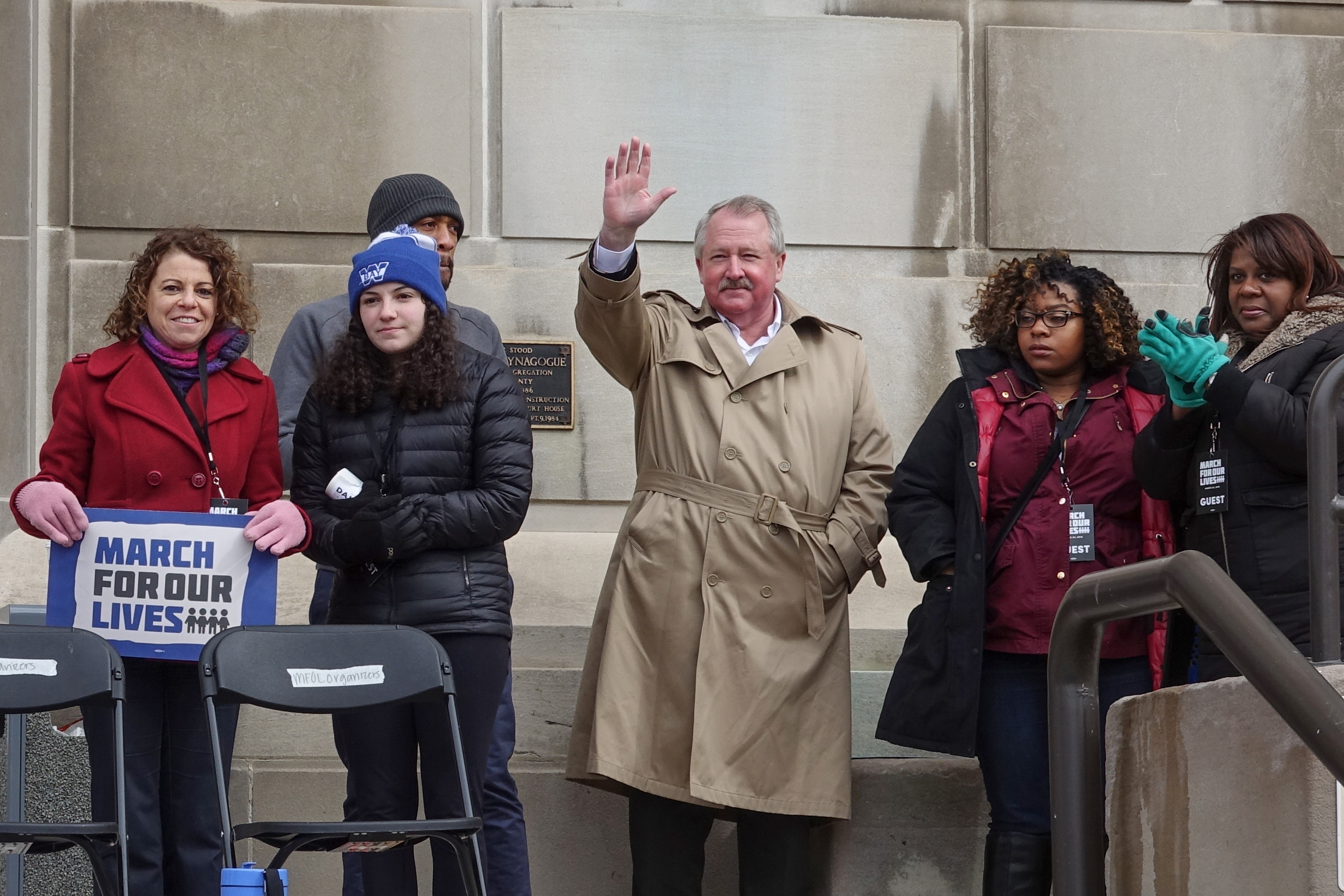
Barnes (at rear) with other elected officials at a 2018 March For Our Lives event

In January 2018, Barnes announced his candidacy for lieutenant governor of Wisconsin in the 2018 election. He won the Democratic Party of Wisconsin straw poll in June 2018 with 80.9% of the vote, earning 617 out of 763 votes. During the primary, his name was omitted from election notices in three newspapers in two different counties. The day before the election, his picture was used in a local news report about a fatal motorcycle crash.

On August 14, 2018, Barnes won the Democratic primary in a landslide over Sheboygan businessman Kurt Kober, and became the running mate of Democratic gubernatorial nominee Tony Evers. Evers and Barnes won the November general election, narrowly defeating incumbent Republicans Scott Walker and Rebecca Kleefisch, 49.5% to 48.4%. Barnes became Wisconsin's first African American lieutenant governor and the nation's youngest lieutenant governor.

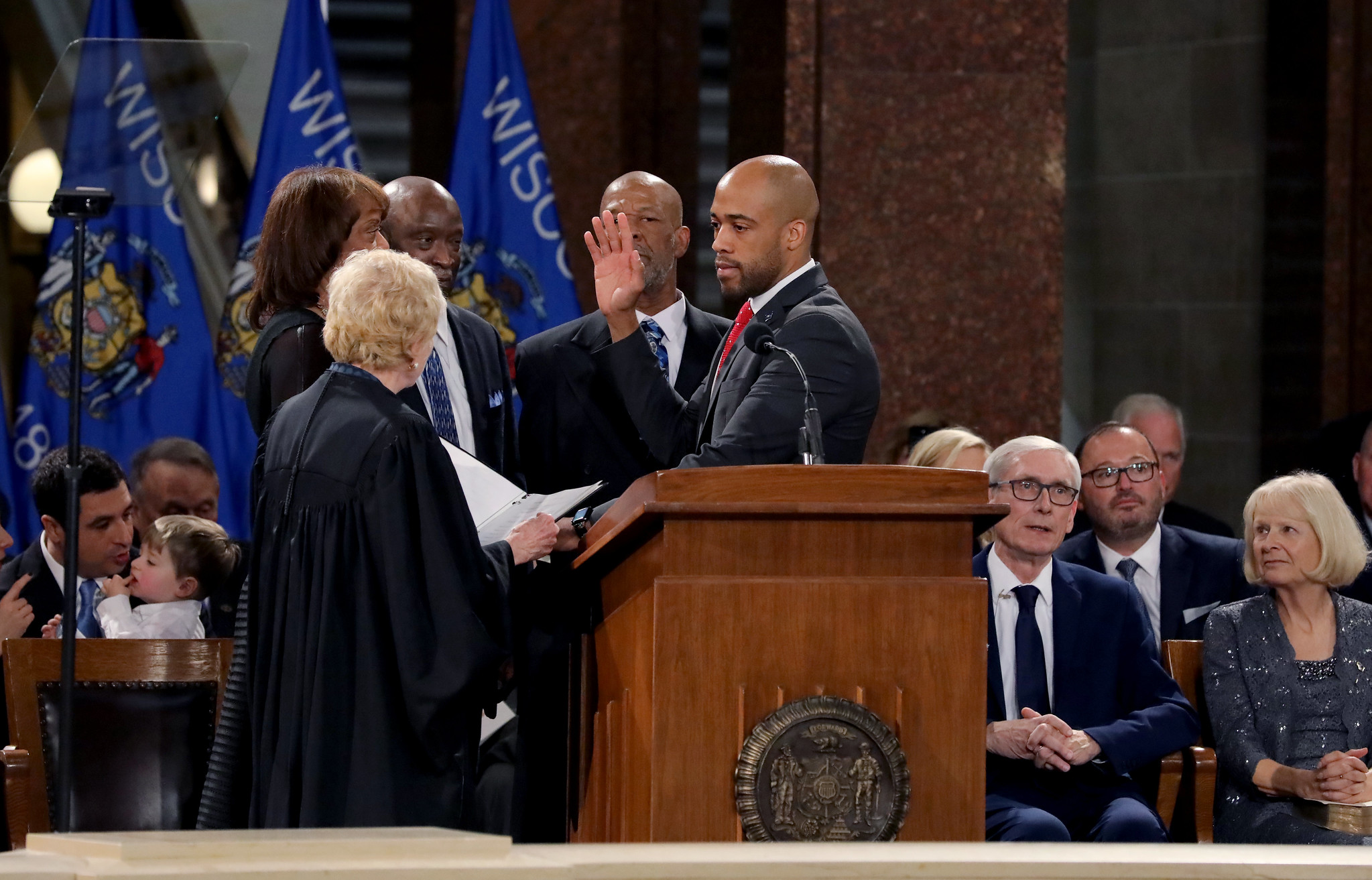
Barnes being sworn in as lieutenant governor in 2019

Barnes was appointed chair of the governor's task force on climate change in October 2019. In December 2020, the task force released its report containing 55 policy recommendations to address climate change in the state. For the 2020 Democratic National Convention in Milwaukee, he served as a vice chair of both the convention and the host committee.

In the first two months of his term, Barnes faced criticism for having logged more hours of security protection than the last lieutenant governor had in all of 2018, although Governor Evers's office approved the additional security. In August 2022, the issue resurfaced when Barnes (now three years into his tenure) had reportedly used ten times as many security hours as his predecessor, who had declined security while doing personal tasks and did not run for the Senate while in office.

In 2019, Barnes gave the Working Families Party response to the State of the Union address. On August 24, 2020, the day after the shooting of Jacob Blake in Kenosha, Wisconsin, Barnes said it was "not an accident", and "This wasn't bad police work. This felt like some sort of vendetta taken out on a member of our community." On January 5, 2021, he condemned the district attorney's decision not to prosecute the officers who shot Blake, tweeting, "The non-prosecuting DAs are as negligent as the officers in these situations".

=== 2022 U.S. Senate campaign ===
On July 20, 2021, Barnes announced his candidacy for the United States Senate in the 2022 election, contesting the seat held by Ron Johnson. Barnes was the eighth person to enter the race for the Democratic nomination. By July 29, 2022, all of Barnes's major competitors had withdrawn from the race and endorsed him, leaving his way clear to be the presumptive Democratic nominee.

During his campaign for Senate, Barnes supported legislation that would codify federal protections of abortion rights nationwide, "to make Roe v Wade the law of the land", and would eliminate the U.S. Senate filibuster to pass such a bill.

Barnes supports Medicare for All as well as incremental steps like lowering the age of enrollment from 65. In September 2021, as a candidate for the Senate, Barnes said in a series of tweets, "In Washington, I'll be one of the few elected officials that have actually been on one of the programs we fund and debate" and, referring to when he was enrolled in the Medicaid-based program in 2018, "I've been on BadgerCare, and I've seen how critical it is for working people." Additionally, Barnes supported a Green New Deal, a $15 per hour minimum wage, eliminating cash bail nationwide, and legalizing marijuana.

Barnes said he would "prioritize preventing gun violence by keeping guns out of the hands of dangerous people" if elected to the Senate, saying in May 2022, "We can save lives or we can kowtow to the gun lobby." He supported red-flag laws, universal background checks for gun sales, and bans on privately made firearms, assault weapons, and high-capacity magazines. He would vote to repeal the Protection of Lawful Commerce in Arms Act, which gives manufacturers and dealers liability protection when a purchaser uses a firearm to commit a crime.

Barnes and Johnson had the first of their two scheduled debates on October 7, 2022, in Milwaukee. In the general election, Johnson narrowly defeated Barnes. If elected, Barnes would have become the first black person to represent Wisconsin in the U.S. Senate. For his loss, his campaign and other Democratic strategists blamed Barnes' relative political inexperience, his vulnerability on policing and crime, the advantage of his opponent's incumbency, and that his campaign was outspent $64 million to $56 million after he was nominated.

=== 2026 Wisconsin gubernatorial campaign ===
Barnes continued to be active in Wisconsin political organizations and nonprofit groups after the 2022 election. In February 2023, he launched The Long Run PAC to help the U.S. political campaigns of "pro-democracy" Democratic candidates who are young, persons of color, members of the LGBTQ community, and/or have working class backgrounds. He has also touted his experience with the nonprofits Forward Together Wisconsin, which aims to implement clean energy investments, and Power to the Polls Wisconsin, which recruits poll workers. Barnes's campaign credits this organization with helping to elect Wisconsin Supreme Court justices Janet Protasiewicz and Susan Crawford.

In July 2025, Governor Evers announced that he would not run for a third term in 2026. Several candidates quickly jumped into the race, including Barnes' successor as lieutenant governor, Sara Rodriguez. Barnes formally launched his campaign for governor on December 3, 2025, with a focus on affordability, expanding BadgerCare, and creating a universal childcare program in the state.

In January 2026, he told PBS Wisconsin that his first priority as governor with a Democratic legislature would be to expand BadgerCare. Ahead of the first major Democratic candidate forum, Barnes proposed to fund startup grants and emergency funds for grocery stores in food deserts. His proposal also included support for initiatives to aid local businesses and state farmers. In March, Barnes announced that he would freeze utility rates by appointing new members to the Public Service Commission, as well as support legislation to limit the salaries of utility executives.

Upon announcing his candidacy, Barnes was considered the frontrunner for the nomination. But he entered a crowded primary field that also included Milwaukee County executive David Crowley, state senator Kelda Roys, state representative Francesca Hong, and two former members of Evers' cabinet. Polling continued to find Barnes as the frontrunner through the first half of 2026.

The primary reached a climax in July, when Crowley suspended his campaign and endorsed Rodriguez. But just days later, Rodriguez reported campaign finance irregularities and ultimately had to end her campaign. As Rodriguez faltered, Crowley re-entered the race with the endorsement of Governor Evers. Polling, however, showed that the biggest beneficiary of the shake-up appeared to be progressive state representative Francesca Hong, who surged into the lead. In the latter half of July, journalists from the Milwaukee Journal Sentinel sought comment from Barnes on past allegations that he had used his political notoriety to have sexual encounters with young women associated with the party. Barnes ended his campaign on July 30, 2026, and the article was published later that day.

Crowley went on to win the general election, becoming the first African American elected governor of Wisconsin. A week after the election, Barnes launched a defamation lawsuit against the Journal Sentinel, claiming that their report about his sex life was false, and alleging that it was improperly influenced by a Journal Sentinel reporter with whom Barnes previously had an intimate relationship. Barnes said of the lawsuit, "I dispute the reporting identified in this complaint and believe it created a materially false picture of me and my conduct. I asked the Journal Sentinel to correct it, and the newspaper declined. I am bringing this case so the disputed facts can be examined through the legal process."

== Electoral history ==
=== Wisconsin Assembly (2012, 2014) ===
Year	Election	Date	Elected				Defeated				Total	Plurality
2012	Primary	Aug. 14	Mandela Barnes	Democratic	2,596	68.14%	Jason Fields (inc)	Dem.	1,206	31.65%	3,810	1,390
2012	General	Nov. 6	Mandela Barnes	Democratic	16,403	98.79%	--unopposed--				16,604	16,202
2014	General	Nov. 4	Mandela Barnes (inc)	Democratic	17,328	98.83%	--unopposed--				17,534	17,122

=== Wisconsin Senate (2016) ===
Year	Election	Date	Elected				Defeated				Total	Plurality
2016	Primary	Aug. 9	Lena Taylor (inc)	Democratic	11,454	60.56%	Mandela Barnes	Dem.	7,433	39.30%	18,913	4,021

=== Lieutenant governor (2018) ===
Year	Election	Date	Elected				Defeated				Total	Plurality
2018	Primary	Aug. 14	Mandela Barnes	Democratic	326,855	67.86%	Kurt J. Kober	Dem.	153,994	31.97%	481,644	172,861
2018	Primary	Aug. 14	Mandela Barnes	Democratic	326,855	67.86%	Corban Gehler (write-in)	Dem.	12	0.00%	481,644	172,861
2018	Primary	Aug. 14	Mandela Barnes	Democratic	326,855	67.86%	William Henry Davis III (write-in)	Dem.	8	0.00%	481,644	172,861
2018	General	Nov. 6	Tony Evers; Mandela Barnes	Democratic	1,324,307	49.54%	Scott Walker (inc); Rebecca Kleefisch (inc)	Rep.	1,295,080	48.44%	2,673,308	29,227
2018	General	Nov. 6	Tony Evers; Mandela Barnes	Democratic	1,324,307	49.54%	Phil Anderson; Patrick Baird	Lib.	20,225	0.76%	2,673,308	29,227
2018	General	Nov. 6	Tony Evers; Mandela Barnes	Democratic	1,324,307	49.54%	Margaret Turnbull; Wil Losch	Ind.	18,884	0.71%	2,673,308	29,227
2018	General	Nov. 6	Tony Evers; Mandela Barnes	Democratic	1,324,307	49.54%	Michael J. White; Tiffany Anderson	Grn.	11,087	0.41%	2,673,308	29,227
2018	General	Nov. 6	Tony Evers; Mandela Barnes	Democratic	1,324,307	49.54%	Arnie Enz; N/A	Ind.	2,745	0.10%	2,673,308	29,227
2018	General	Nov. 6	Tony Evers; Mandela Barnes	Democratic	1,324,307	49.54%	Other write-ins		14	0.00%	2,673,308	29,227

=== U.S. Senate (2022) ===
Year	Election	Date	Elected				Defeated				Total	Plurality
2022	Primary	Aug. 9	Mandela Barnes	Democratic	390,279	77.78%	Alex Lasry (withdrawn)	Dem.	44,609	8.89%	501,760	345,670
2022	Primary	Aug. 9	Mandela Barnes	Democratic	390,279	77.78%	Sarah Godlewski (withdrawn)	Dem.	40,555	8.08%	501,760	345,670
2022	Primary	Aug. 9	Mandela Barnes	Democratic	390,279	77.78%	Tom Nelson (withdrawn)	Dem.	10,995	2.19%	501,760	345,670
2022	Primary	Aug. 9	Mandela Barnes	Democratic	390,279	77.78%	Steven Olikara	Dem.	5,619	1.12%	501,760	345,670
2022	Primary	Aug. 9	Mandela Barnes	Democratic	390,279	77.78%	Darrell Williams	Dem.	3,646	0.73%	501,760	345,670
2022	Primary	Aug. 9	Mandela Barnes	Democratic	390,279	77.78%	Kou C. Lee	Dem.	3,434	0.68%	501,760	345,670
2022	Primary	Aug. 9	Mandela Barnes	Democratic	390,279	77.78%	Peter Peckarsky	Dem.	2,446	0.49%	501,760	345,670
2022	General	Nov. 8	Ron Johnson (inc)	Republican	1,337,185	50.41%	Mandela Barnes	Dem.	1,310,467	49.41%	2,652,477	26,718
2022	General	Nov. 8	Ron Johnson (inc)	Republican	1,337,185	50.41%	Adam Paul (write-in)	Ind.	67	0.00%	2,652,477	26,718

=== Wisconsin governor (2026) ===
Year	Election	Date	Elected				Defeated				Total	Plurality
2026	Primary	Aug. 11	David Crowley	Democratic	315,413	39.81%	Francesca Hong	Dem.	311,740	39.35%	792,290	3,673
2026	Primary	Aug. 11	David Crowley	Democratic	315,413	39.81%	Kelda Roys	Dem.	59,394	7.50%	792,290	3,673
2026	Primary	Aug. 11	David Crowley	Democratic	315,413	39.81%	Joel Brennan	Dem.	37,084	4.68%	792,290	3,673
2026	Primary	Aug. 11	David Crowley	Democratic	315,413	39.81%	Sara Rodriguez (withdrawn)	Dem.	32,674	4.12%	792,290	3,673
2026	Primary	Aug. 11	David Crowley	Democratic	315,413	39.81%	Mandela Barnes (withdrawn)	Dem.	32,435	4.09%	792,290	3,673
2026	Primary	Aug. 11	David Crowley	Democratic	315,413	39.81%	Missy Hughes (withdrawn)	Dem.	3,230	0.41%	792,290	3,673
2026	Primary	Aug. 11	David Crowley	Democratic	315,413	39.81%	Brett Hulsey (write-in; withdrawn)	Dem.	13	0.00%	792,290	3,673
2026	Primary	Aug. 11	David Crowley	Democratic	315,413	39.81%	Tim Reppen (write-in)	Dem.	10	0.00%	792,290	3,673

== See also ==
- List of lieutenant governors of Wisconsin
- List of minority governors and lieutenant governors in the United States
- List of African-American United States Senate candidates

Party political offices
Preceded by John Lehman	Democratic nominee for Lieutenant Governor of Wisconsin; 2018	Succeeded by Sara Rodriguez
Preceded by Russ Feingold	Democratic nominee for U.S. Senator from Wisconsin (Class 3); 2022	Most recent
Political offices
Preceded by Rebecca Kleefisch	Lieutenant Governor of Wisconsin; 2019–2023	Succeeded by Sara Rodriguez
