= Dretzka Park =

Park in Milwaukee, Wisconsin, US

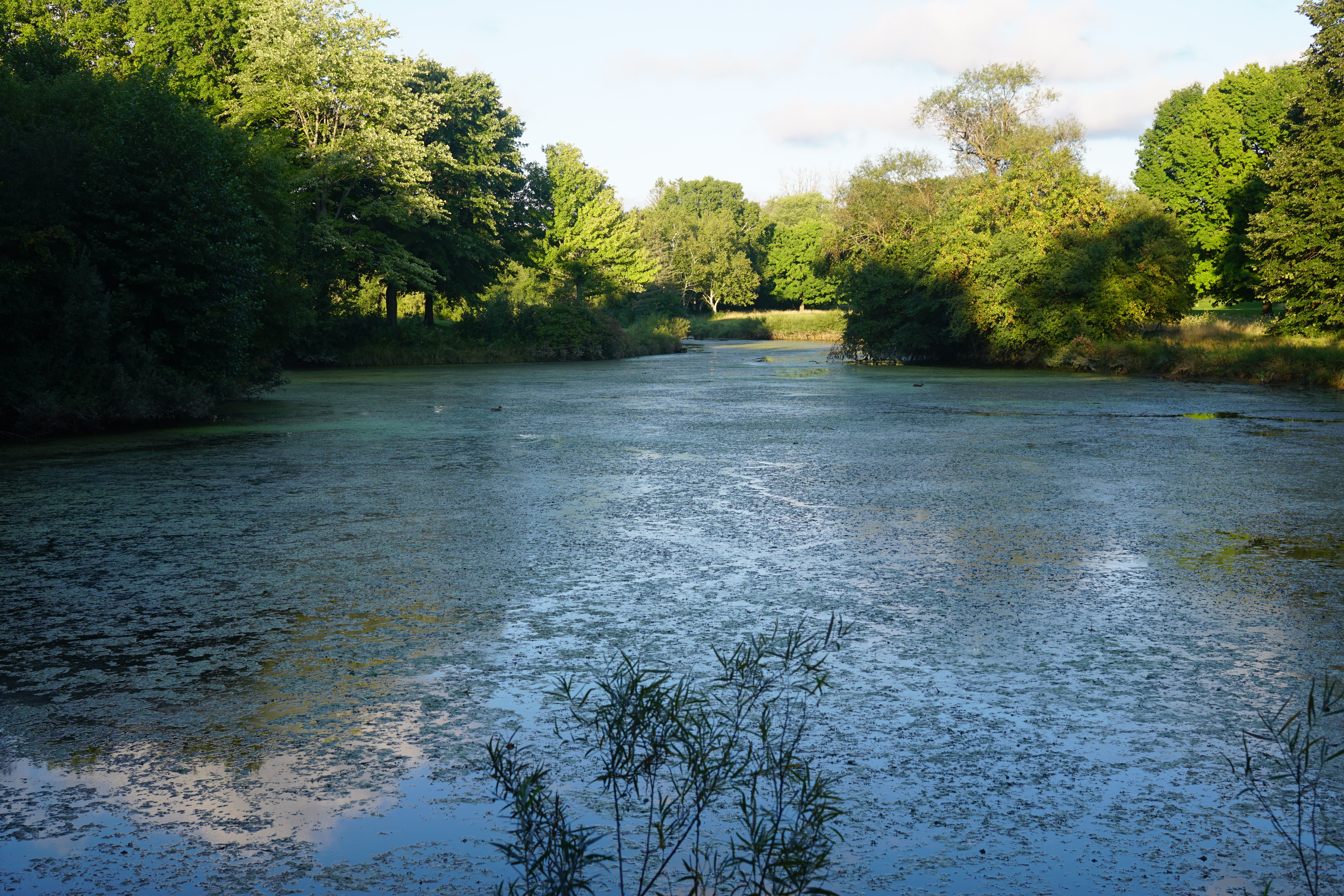
- Pond on the Dretzka Park golf course between the 10th and 11th hole
- Interactive map of Dretzka Park
- Location: Milwaukee, Wisconsin 53214
- Nearest city: Menomonee Falls
- Coordinates: 43.168611°N 88.056389°W
- Area: 327 acres (132 ha)
- Etymology: Jerome C. Dretzka
- Owner: Public

Dretzka Park is a 327 acres (132 ha) acre park on the north side of Milwaukee, Wisconsin in the United States. The park was named for Polish immigrant Jerome C. Dretzka who served on the Milwaukee County Park System Commission for 43 years.

== History ==
The park was named for Polish immigrant Jerome C. Dretzka who was the executive Secretary of the Milwaukee County Park commission. Dretzka served as from 1920 to 1963 on the Milwaukee County Park Commission. He was also the procurement officer of the Civilian Conservation Corps for the state of Wisconsin and the Upper Peninsula of Michigan. He authorized the purchase of all materials, supplies and purchases that were needed to complete the projects.

In 2019 the Dretzka Park Golf Course had revenue of US$844,000. In 2020 during the 2020 COVID-19 pandemic the golf course had revenue of US$1.021 million. In 2022 the park had improvement projects including improved green areas, LED lighting, replacement of the Dretzka Golf Clubhouse parking lot, and storm water planning.

== Design ==
The park has 327 acres (132 ha) acres including a 210-acre public 18 hole golf course and riding trails. The park also has a disc golf course. There are softball and baseball areas, with playground areas, and areas for ice skating, skiing and sledding.

== See also ==
- Parks of Milwaukee
