= Mayoral elections in Green Bay, Wisconsin =

Nonpartisan elections are currently held every four years to elect the mayor of Green Bay, Wisconsin. Wisconsin law provides that no party designation appears on the official ballot for city offices.

== 1995 ==
The 1995 Green Bay mayoral election was held to elect the mayor of Green Bay, Wisconsin. It saw the election of Paul Jadin.

Entering the race as a political unknown, Jadin advanced to the general election from an eight-candidate nonpartisan primary. In the general election, Jadin won 55% of the vote.

== 1999 ==
The 1999 Green Bay mayoral election was held to elect the mayor of Green Bay, Wisconsin. It saw the reelection of Paul Jadin.

Jadin became the first mayor in over a half-century to win an election unopposed.

== 2003 ==
Green Bay mayoral election, 2003
- February 18, 2003 (primary); April 1, 2003 (general)
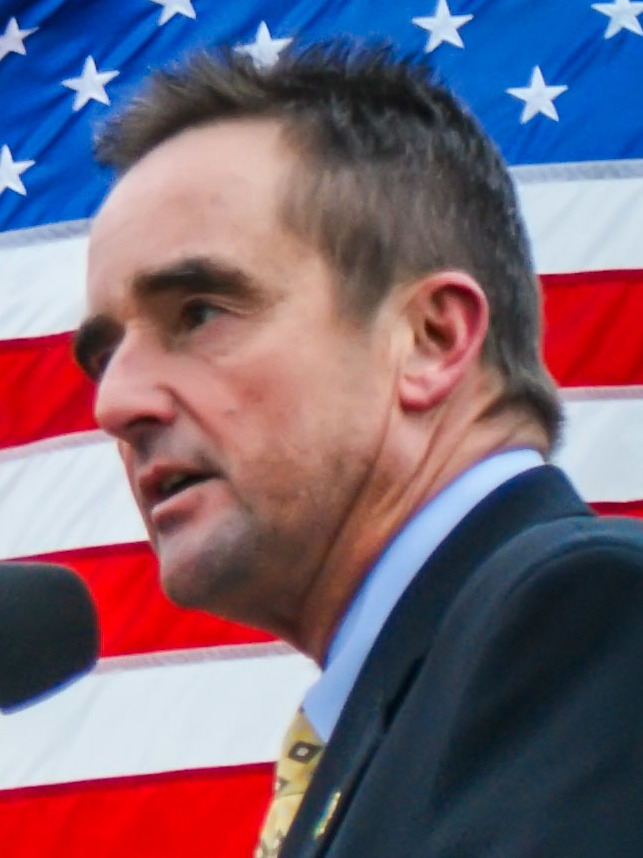

Candidate	Jim Schmitt	David Nennig
Party	Nonpartisan	Nonpartisan
Popular vote	10,073	8,686
Percentage	53.60%	46.22%
Mayor before election
Paul Jadin
Elected mayor
Jim Schmitt

The 2003 Green Bay mayoral election was held on February 18 and April 1, 2003, to elect the mayor of Green Bay, Wisconsin. It saw the election of Jim Schmitt.

=== Results ===
2003 Green Bay mayoral primary results
Candidate	Votes	%
Jim Schmitt	3,687	43.89
David Nennig	3,096	36.85
Mark Anderson	964	11.47
Steve Terrien	626	7.45
Write-ins	28	0.33
Total votes	8,401	100

2003 Green Bay mayoral general election results
Candidate	Votes	%
Jim Schmitt	10,073	53.60
David Nennig	8,686	46.22
Write-ins	35	0.19
Total votes	18,794	100

== 2007 ==
Green Bay mayoral election, 2007
- April 3, 2007
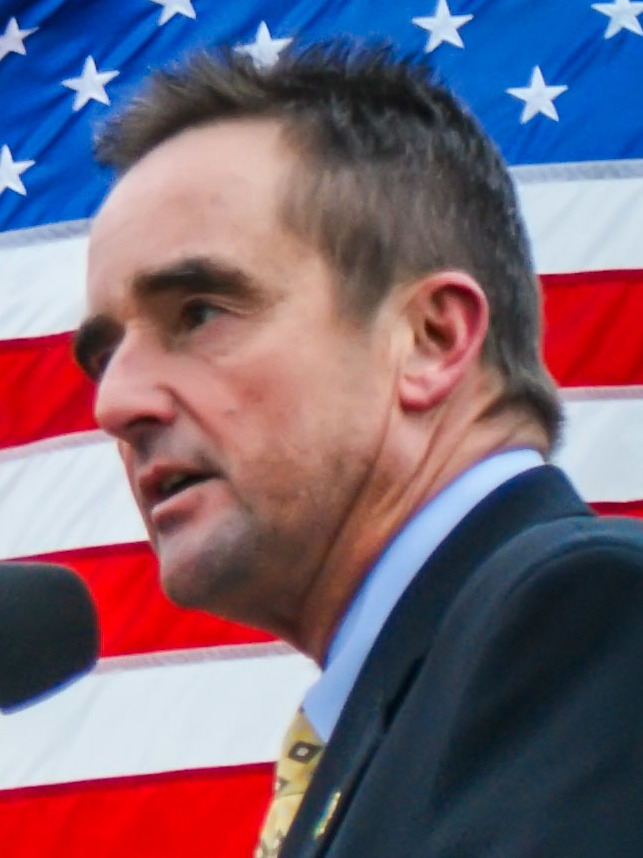

Candidate	Jim Schmitt	Gary L. Kreischer
Party	Nonpartisan	Nonpartisan
Popular vote	10,373	4,640
Percentage	68.66%	30.71%
Mayor before election
Jim Schmitt
Elected mayor
Jim Schmitt

The 2007 Green Bay mayoral election was held on April 3, 2007 to elect the mayor of Green Bay, Wisconsin. It saw the reelection of incumbent mayor Jim Schmitt.

=== Results ===
2007 Green Bay mayoral general election results
Candidate	Votes	%
Jim Schmitt (incumbent)	10,373	68.66
Gary L. Kreischer	4,640	30.71
Write-ins	94	0.62
Total votes	15,107	100

== 2011 ==
Green Bay mayoral election, 2011
- February 15, 2011 (primary); April 5, 2011 (general)
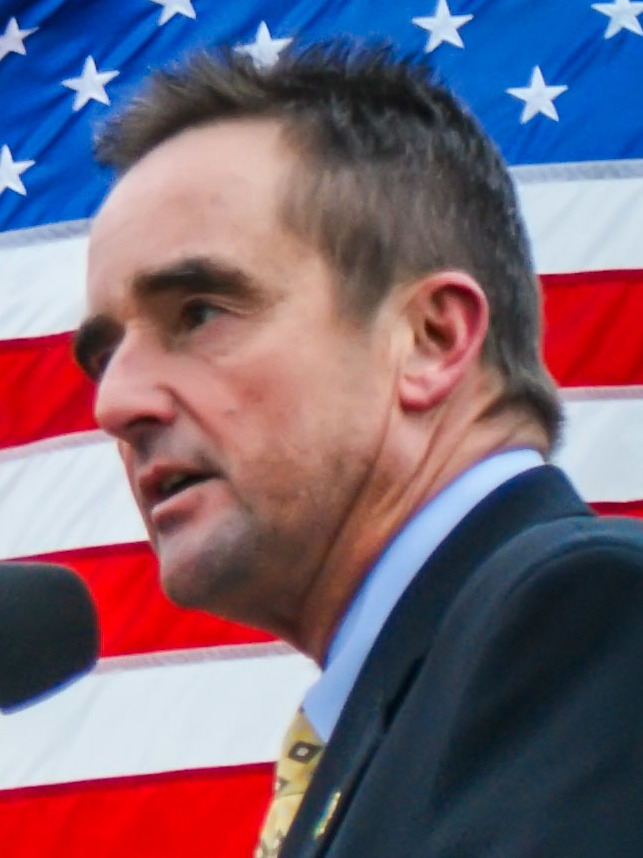

Candidate	Jim Schmitt	Patrick Evans
Party	Nonpartisan	Nonpartisan
Popular vote	13,916	9,038
Percentage	60.25%	39.13%
Mayor before election
Jim Schmitt
Elected mayor
Jim Schmitt

The 2011 Green Bay mayoral election was held on February 15 and April 5, 2011, to elect the mayor of Green Bay, Wisconsin. It saw the reelection of incumbent mayor Jim Schmitt.

=== Results ===
2011 Green Bay mayoral primary results
Candidate	Votes	%
Patrick Evans	3,431	28.69
Jim Schmitt (incumbent)	3,284	27.46
Amy Kocha	2,207	18.46
Christopher Wery	1,252	10.47
Thomas J. De Wane	961	8.04
Bill Ressch	677	5.66
Dave Nichols	143	1.20
Write-ins	3	0.03
Total votes	11,958	100

2011 Green Bay mayoral general election results
Candidate	Votes	%
Jim Schmitt (incumbent)	13,916	60.25
Patrick Evans	9,038	39.13
Write-ins	142	0.61
Total votes	23,096	100

== 2015 ==
Green Bay mayoral election, 2015
- February 17, 2015 (primary); April 7, 2015 (general)
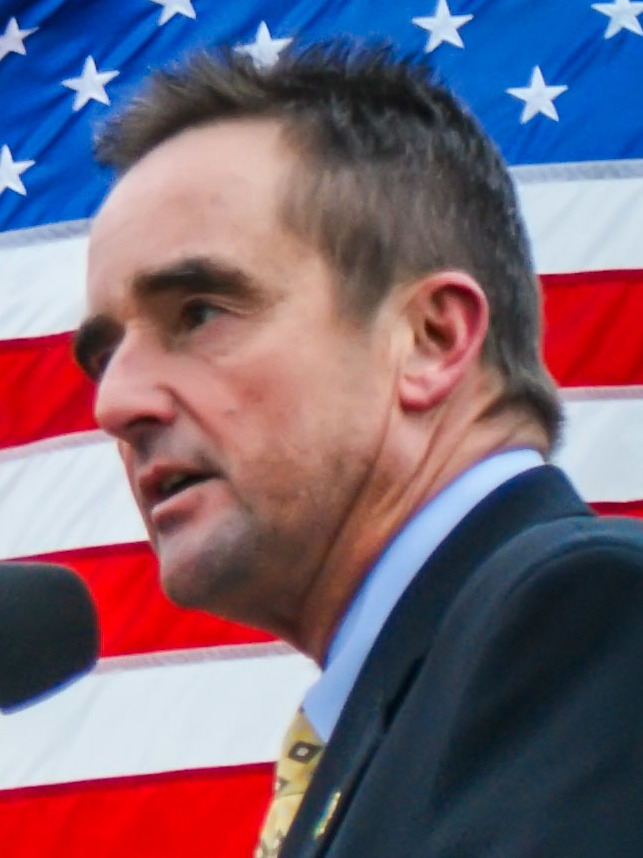

Candidate	Jim Schmitt	Thomas J. De Wane
Party	Nonpartisan	Nonpartisan
Popular vote	8,543	7,636
Percentage	52.64%	47.05%
Mayor before election
Jim Schmitt
Elected mayor
Jim Schmitt

The 2015 Green Bay mayoral election was held on February 17 and April 7, 2015, to elect the mayor of Green Bay, Wisconsin. It saw the reelection of incumbent mayor Jim Schmitt.

=== Results ===
2015 Green Bay mayoral primary results
Candidate	Votes	%
Jim Schmitt (incumbent)	3,604	51.23
Thomas J. De Wane	2,599	36.94
David VanderLeest	810	11.51
Write-ins	22	0.31
Total votes	7,035	100

Green Bay mayoral general election results
Candidate	Votes	%
Jim Schmitt (incumbent)	8,543	52.64
Thomas J. De Wane	7,636	47.05
Write-ins	50	0.31
Total votes	16,229	100

== 2019 ==
2019 Green Bay mayoral election
- April 2, 2019
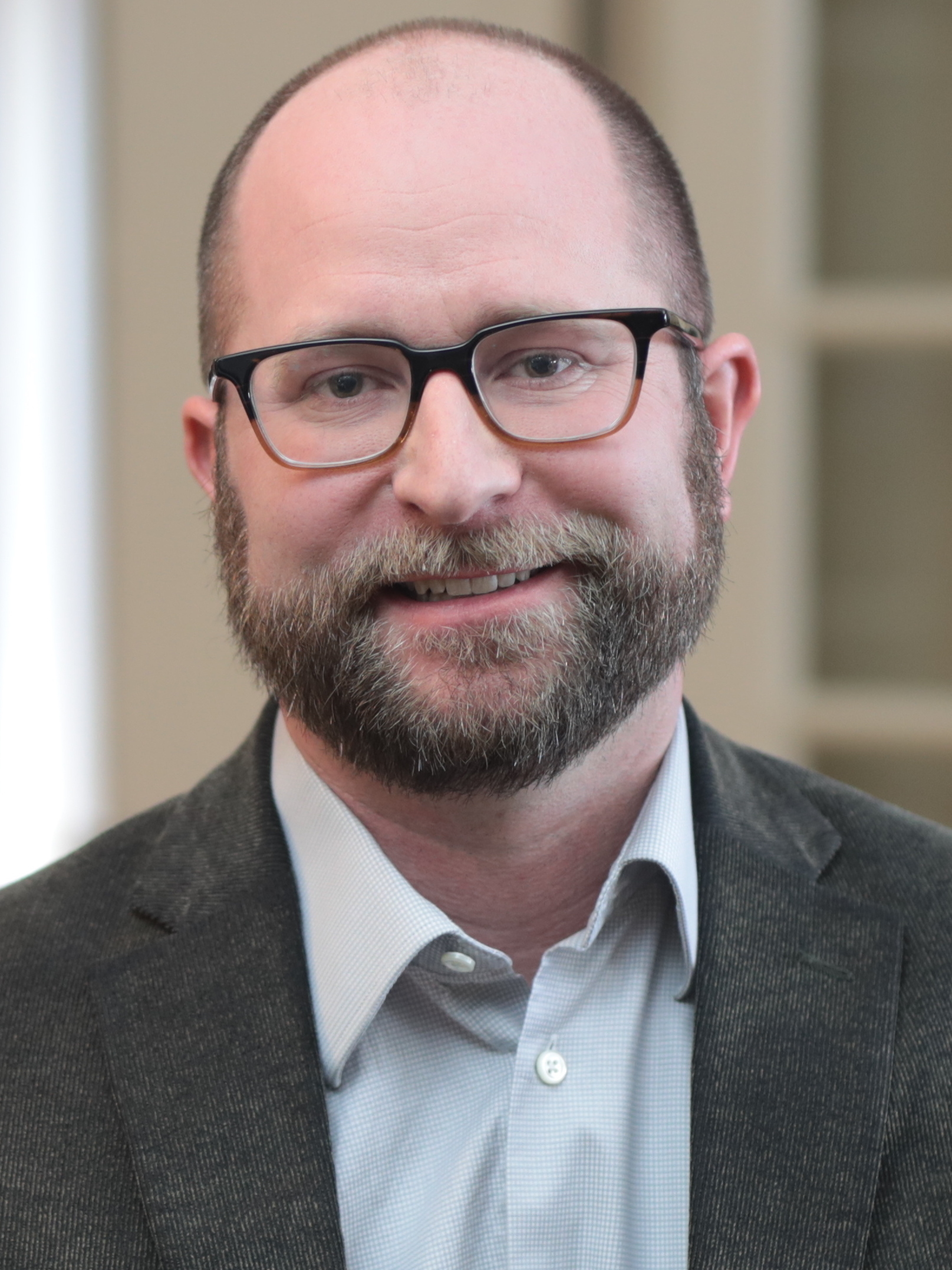

Candidate	Eric Genrich	Patrick Buckley
Party	Nonpartisan	Nonpartisan
Popular vote	11,421	8,296
Percentage	57.61%	41.85%
Mayor before election
Jim Schmitt
Elected mayor
Eric Genrich

The 2019 Green Bay mayoral election was held on February 19

, 2019, to elect the mayor of Green Bay, Wisconsin. It saw the election of Eric Genrich. The primary election was held on April 17.

Incumbent mayor Jim Schmitt did not seek reelection.

While the election was officially nonpartisan, the two candidates who advanced to the general election were both backed by a major political party, Genrich by the Democratic Party and Buckley by the Republican Party.

=== Polls ===
General election

Poll source	Date(s) administered	Sample size	Margin of error	Patrick Buckley	Eric Genrich	Undecided
Public Policy Polling	February 22–24, 2019	607	± 4%	25%	47%	

=== Results ===
2019 Green Bay mayoral primary results
Candidate	Votes	%
Eric Genrich	4,505	43.73
Patrick Buckley	1,871	18.16
Patrick M. Evans	1,799	17.46
Guy Zima	853	8.28
Joe Moore	525	5.10
Mark Steuer	507	4.92
Nick Mortensen	166	1.61
Paul Boucher	68	0.66
Write-ins	8	0.18
Total votes	10,201	100

2019 Green Bay mayoral general election results
Candidate	Votes	%
Eric Genrich	11,421	57.61
Patrick Buckley	8,296	41.85
Write-ins	108	0.54
Total votes	19,825	100

== 2023 ==
2023 Green Bay mayoral election
- April 4, 2023
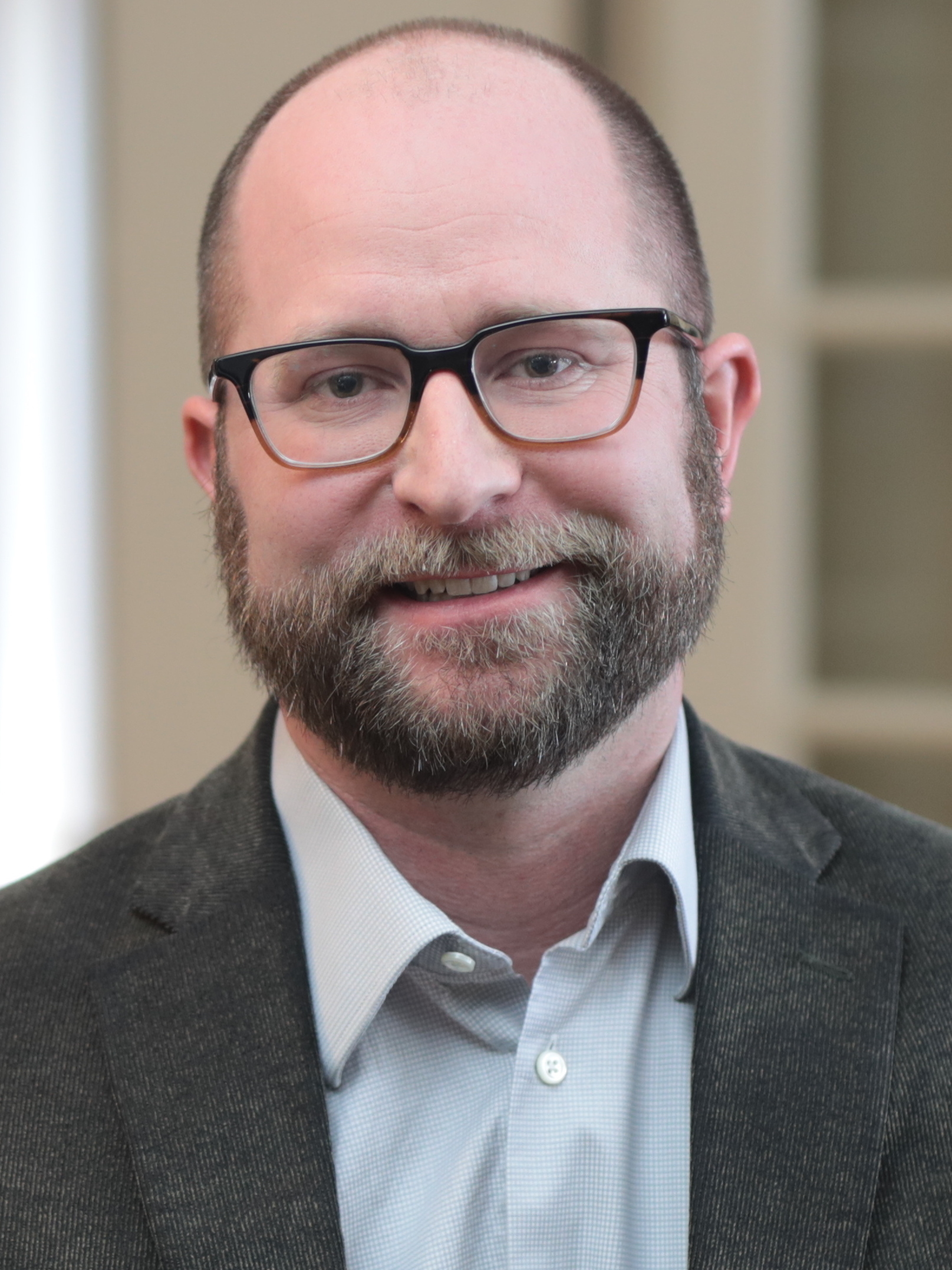

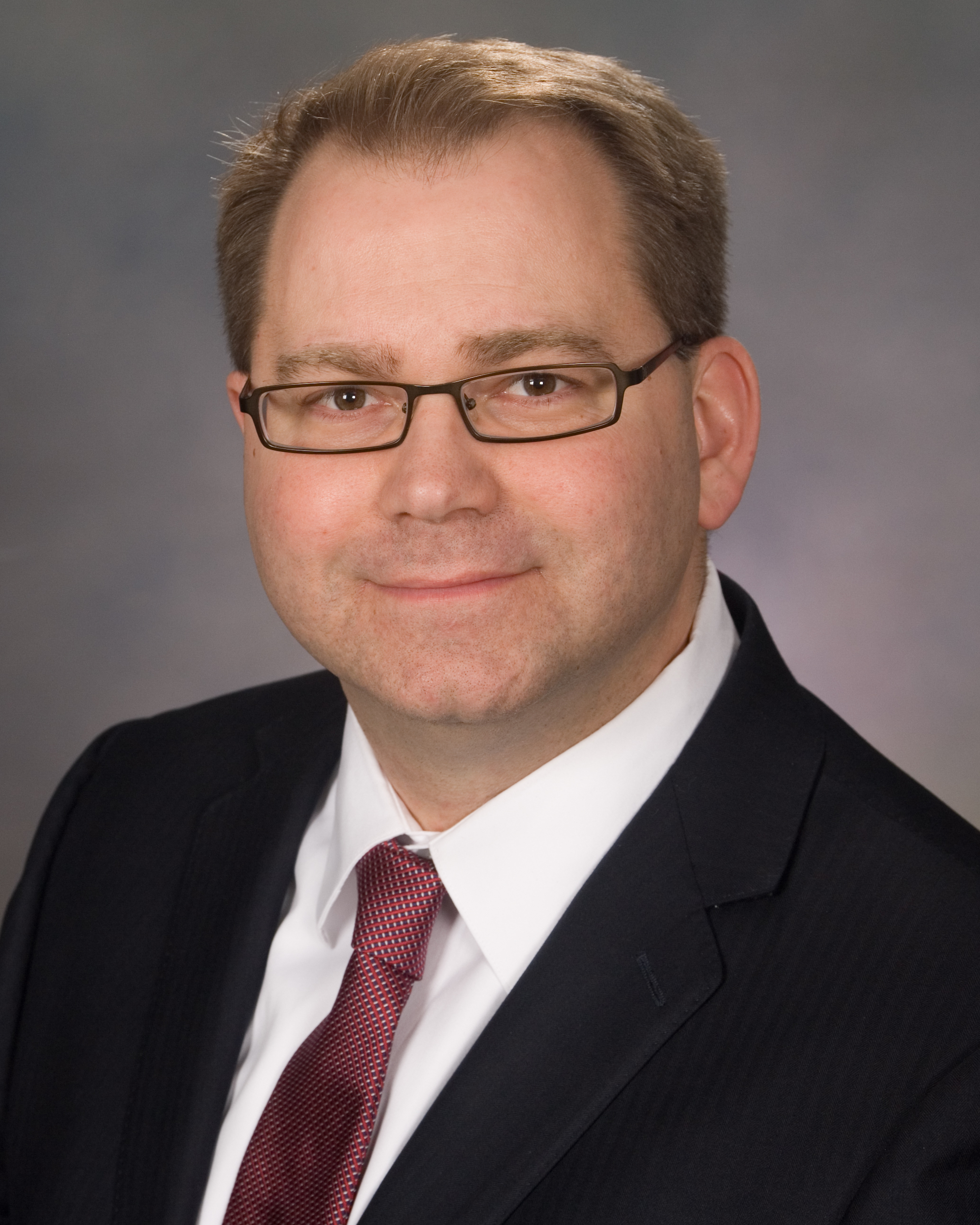
Candidate	Eric Genrich	Chad Weininger
Party	Nonpartisan	Nonpartisan
Popular vote	13,507	11,999
Percentage	52.96%	47.04%
- Precinct results Genrich: 50–60% 60–70% 70–80% 80–90% >90% Weininger: 50–60% 60–70% 70–80% Tie: 50% No votes
Mayor before election
Eric Genrich
Nonpartisan
Elected mayor
Eric Genrich
Nonpartisan

The 2023 Green Bay mayoral election was held on April 4, 2023, to elect the mayor of Green Bay, Wisconsin. It was preceded by a primary election held on February 21. Incumbent mayor Eric Genrich ran for re-election to a second term in office. Genrich and challenger Chad Weininger advanced to the general election, where Genrich defeated Weininger.

=== Candidates ===
==== Declared ====
- Paul Boucher, perennial candidate
- Eric Genrich, incumbent mayor (party affiliation: Democratic)
- Jane Juza, laundromat owner and real estate agent
- Chad Weininger, Brown County director of administration, former Green Bay city clerk, and former state assemblyman (party affiliation: Republican)

==== Declined ====
- Jesse Brunette, city council president
- Brian Johnson, city council vice president
- Jim Schmitt, former mayor

=== Primary election ===
2023 Green Bay mayoral primary election
Candidate	Votes	%
Chad Weininger	6,189	47.3%
Eric Genrich (incumbent)	6,102	46.7%
Jane Juza	505	3.9%
Paul Boucher	279	2.1%
Write-ins	16	0.5%
Total votes	3,070	100.0%

=== General election ===
2023 Green Bay mayoral general election
Candidate	Votes	%
Eric Genrich (incumbent)	13,507	52.96
Chad Weininger	11,999	47.04
Write-ins		
Total votes		100.0%
