= Jim Schmitt =

American politician (born 1958)

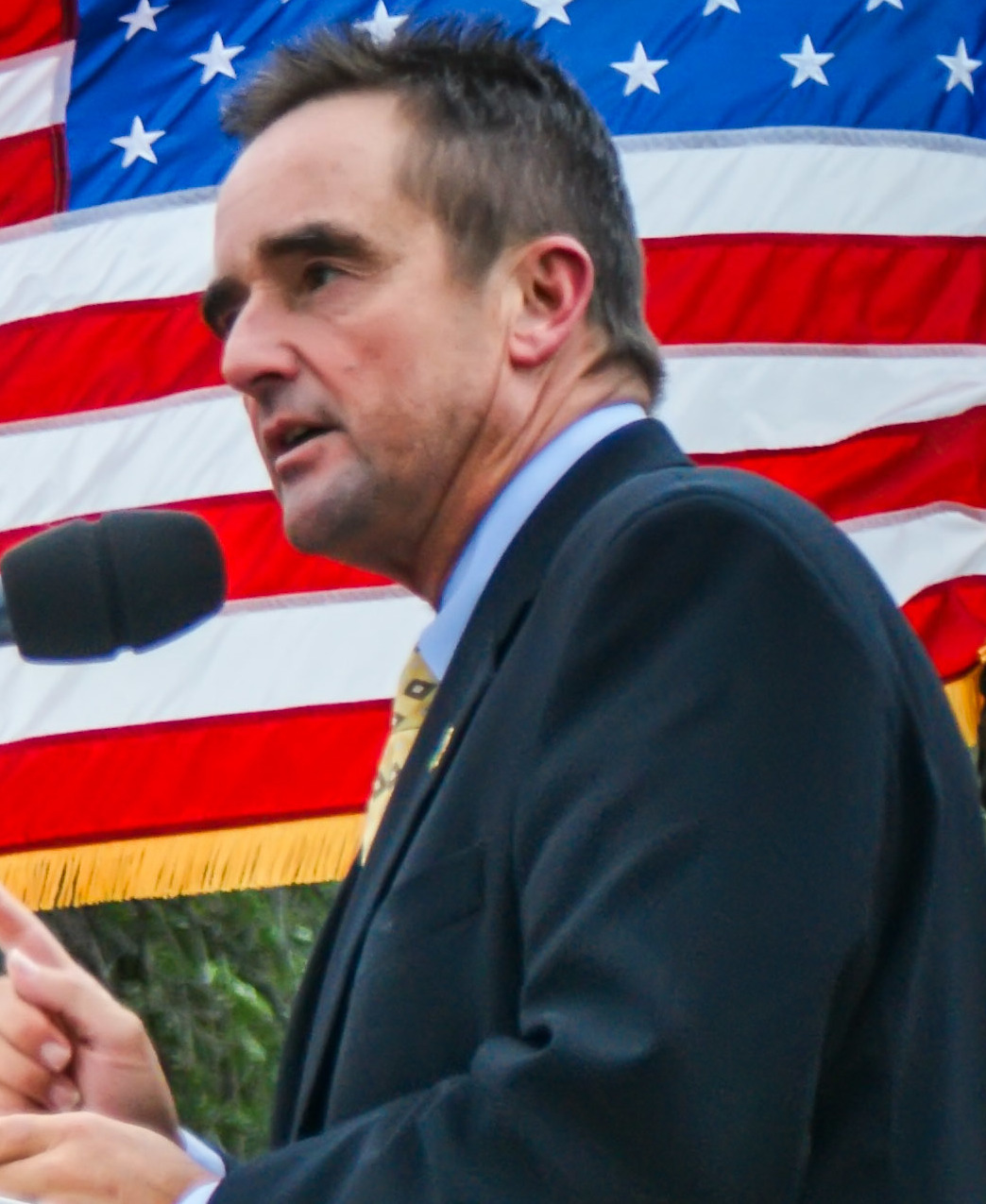

47th Mayor of Green Bay, Wisconsin
- In office April 1, 2003 – April 15, 2019
- Preceded by: Paul Jadin
- Succeeded by: Eric Genrich

Personal details
- Born: June 7, 1958 (age 68) Two Rivers, Wisconsin, U.S.
- Spouse: Dona Degenhardt (m. 1990)
- Children: 3 (+1 deceased)
- Education: St. Norbert College (B.A.)

James J. Schmitt (born June 7, 1958) is an American politician and businessman from Wisconsin. He served as the 47th mayor of Green Bay, Wisconsin, from 2003 to 2019, becoming the city's longest-serving mayor. Since leaving office, he has hosted the radio programs Maino and the Mayor and Lean Local on the Civic Media network.

== Early life and education ==
The fourth of 11 children born to James and Mary (née Gleichner) Schmitt in Two Rivers, Wisconsin, he attended Roncalli High School. He earned a bachelor's degree in business administration from St. Norbert College in De Pere, Wisconsin, and later completed the Senior Executives in State and Local Government program at Harvard University's John F. Kennedy School of Government. He is Roman Catholic; one of his brothers is a member of a religious order.

In 2011 he was recognized by the Green Bay Press-Gazette editorial board as Person of the Year.

== Business career ==
Before entering public office, Schmitt was president of Famis Manufacturing, Inc., a Green Bay-area firm, from 1992 to 2003. In 1997, he received the Greater Green Bay Chamber of Commerce's Small Business Entrepreneur of the Year award.

== Brown County Board of Supervisors ==
From 1999 to 2003, Schmitt served two consecutive terms on the Brown County Board of Supervisors.

== Mayor of Green Bay (2003–2019) ==
=== Elections ===
In the nonpartisan mayoral election of April 2003, Schmitt succeeded Paul Jadin, who did not seek re-election, becoming the mayor of Green Bay. He was re-elected in 2007 with approximately 70% of the vote, and again in 2011. On February 17, 2015, Schmitt received 51 percent of the vote in a three-way primary, and defeated Tom DeWane in the general election, 53% to 47%. With this victory, Schmitt extended his tenure to 16 years and overtook Sam Halloin as the longest-serving mayor in Green Bay history. Under Wisconsin law, mayoral elections are conducted on a nonpartisan basis.

=== Governance and accomplishments ===
During Schmitt's 16-year tenure, downtown Green Bay underwent major redevelopment, with investments estimated at more than $250 million. Projects completed during his administration included the CityDeck riverwalk, the expansion of the KI Convention Center, the Schreiber Foods corporate office, Associated Bank's corporate headquarters, the Green Bay Children's Museum, the Nicolet Bank headquarters, and the restoration of Hotel Northland. Bay Beach Amusement Park added the Zippin Pippin wooden roller coaster, relocated from Memphis, Tennessee, in 2011. During his tenure, the city's assessed property value grew from approximately $4 billion to more than $6 billion.

Schmitt opposed a proposed Walmart supercenter on the former Larsen Green site in the Broadway District; the rezoning was rejected by the Common Council. The city also helped establish more than 35 neighborhood associations.

In 2011, the Green Bay Press-Gazette editorial board named Schmitt its Person of the Year, citing the city's positioning for growth.

=== Public health initiatives ===
In 2015, the City of Green Bay partnered with the National Forum for Heart Disease and Stroke Prevention under its "Move with the Mayor" national initiative, launching a program of midday walks led by the mayor to encourage physical activity and cardiovascular disease prevention awareness. The program continued under Schmitt's successor.

=== National engagement and intergovernmental collaboration ===
Schmitt served on the advisory boards of the United States Conference of Mayors and the League of Wisconsin Municipalities.

On January 26, 2011, Schmitt greeted President Barack Obama on the tarmac at Austin Straubel International Airport, presenting the president with a Green Bay Packers jersey signed by cornerback Charles Woodson. Obama later referred to "Governor Walker and Mayor Schmitt" in remarks delivered at the White House during the Super Bowl XLV champions' visit in August 2011. In January 2012, Obama greeted Schmitt at a reception for U.S. mayors in the East Room of the White House, as documented in the Obama White House archives.

In August 2013, Schmitt spoke at the opening of the Milo C. Huempfner Department of Veterans Affairs Outpatient Clinic in Green Bay alongside U.S. Senator Tammy Baldwin and VA regional administrator Jeffrey Murawsky. Schmitt told attendees he was "proud to have the facility within the city limits."

/>

=== Campaign finance investigation ===
In January 2015, Green Bay city council Aldermen Chris Wery, Guy Zima, and Andy Nicholson alleged that Schmitt had accepted as much as $10,000 in illegal donations for his mayoral campaign. Schmitt contended that the errors were unintentional and handed his records over to the Brown County District Attorney and the Wisconsin Government Accountability Board to be audited. Due to a potential conflict of interest, the Brown County District Attorney turned the records over to the Milwaukee County District Attorney.

In September 2016, Schmitt agreed to plead guilty as part of a plea agreement to three misdemeanor charges, including false statements to an election official, accepting campaign contributions not belonging to the reported contributor, and accepting campaign contributions in excess of state limits. He was subsequently convicted on these criminal charges and sentenced to a monetary forfeiture and community service.

It was found that 17 individuals had donated more than the $1,040 contribution limit, and there were two corporate donations, which are illegal under state election laws.

On February 20, 2017, the Common Council held a vote on the removal of Schmitt over campaign finance violations. While a majority of the 12 member board voted for removal, 9 votes were necessary to remove the mayor from office. As only 8 voted for removal, he retained his seat by one vote.

In 2017, seven City Council members signed a letter stating their disapproval of the conduct of one of Schmitt's accusers, Alderman Chris Wery, who used his bank job to pry into an opponent's financial records.

== Post-mayoral career ==
In 2022, Schmitt publicly considered running to reclaim the mayor's office in the 2023 election but ultimately announced he would not seek the position.

In June 2023, he and radio host John Maino launched Maino and the Mayor, a weekday morning show on WGBW in Green Bay and WISS in the Appleton–Oshkosh market, distributed by the Civic Media network. The program concluded its run on WGBW in 2025. He also hosts Lean Local, a weekly Civic Media program focused on local governance and community issues, which Civic Media describes as bypassing conventional left-versus-right political framing. Guests have included current Green Bay mayor Eric Genrich.

== Personal life ==
Schmitt married Dona Degenhardt on May 26, 1990. They have three living children (all daughters) and another child who died in infancy.

== See also ==
- 2003 Green Bay mayoral election
- 2007 Green Bay mayoral election
- 2011 Green Bay mayoral election
- 2015 Green Bay mayoral election

Political offices
Preceded by Paul Jadin	Mayor of Green Bay, Wisconsin; 2003 - 2019	Succeeded by Eric Genrich
