= 2010 United States Senate election in Wisconsin =

- November 2, 2010
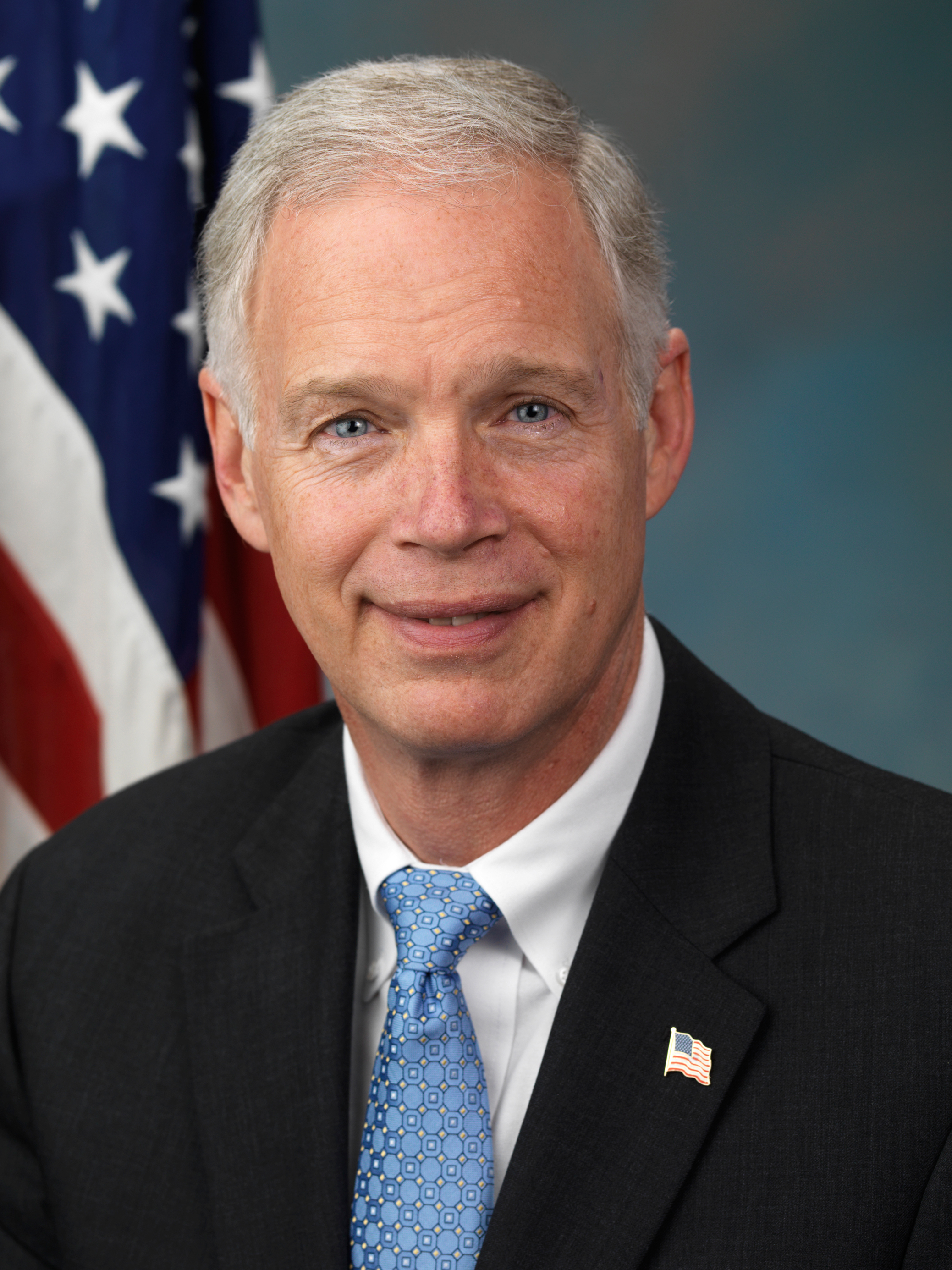

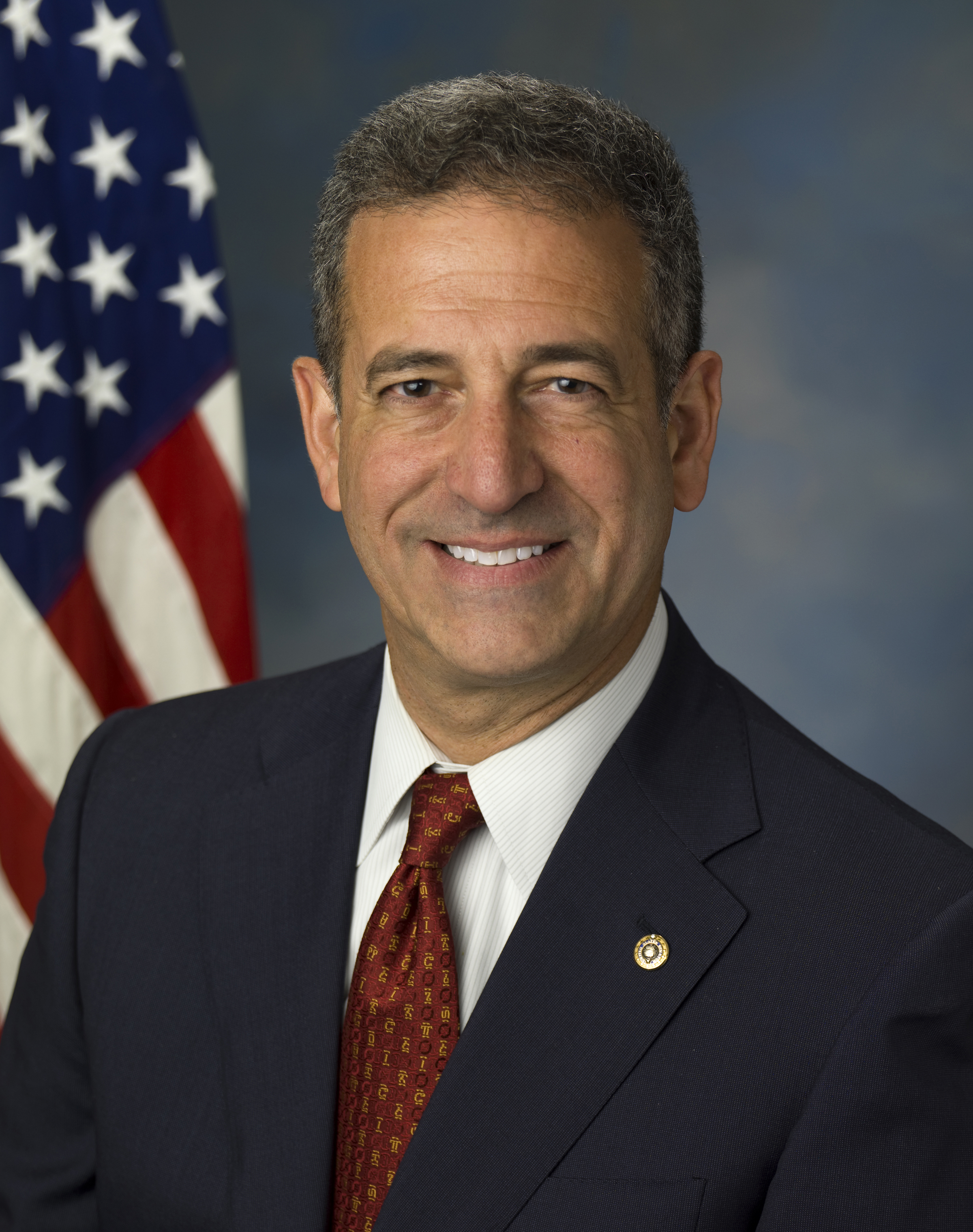
Nominee	Ron Johnson	Russ Feingold
Party	Republican	Democratic
Popular vote	1,125,932	1,020,841
Percentage	51.86%	47.02%
- Johnson: 40–50% 50–60% 60–70% 70–80% 80–90% >90% Feingold: 40–50% 50–60% 60–70% 70–80% 80–90% >90% Tie
U.S. senator before election
Russ Feingold
Democratic
Elected U.S. Senator
Ron Johnson
Republican

The 2010 United States Senate election in Wisconsin was held on November 2, 2010. Incumbent Democratic Senator Russ Feingold lost re-election to a fourth term to Republican challenger Ron Johnson, a businessman and first-time candidate. Johnson was the first Republican to win a Senate election in Wisconsin since 1986. Feingold also became the fifth senator in a row from Wisconsin's Class 3 Senate seat to be defeated for re-election in the general election, and the seventh in a row overall to lose by a defeat in either the primary or general elections. Johnson was re-elected in 2016 in a rematch with Feingold. This is also the last time an incumbent U.S. Senator was defeated for reelection in Wisconsin.

== Republican primary ==
=== Candidates ===
On the ballot

- Stephen Finn, plumber
- Ron Johnson, businessman
- Dave Westlake, businessman

Declined

- Ted Kanavas, state senator
- Dick Leinenkugel (dropped out), former state commerce secretary
- Tommy Thompson, former governor of Wisconsin
- Terrence Wall (dropped out), real estate developer

=== Campaign ===
Former Republican Governor of Wisconsin Tommy Thompson had expressed an interest in challenging Feingold, but ruled himself out of the race in April 2010.

Johnson, a millionaire manufacturer and Tea Party movement favorite running for political office for the first time, was the frontrunner. In response to controversy over his ownership of stock in BP, Johnson said he would sell it when market conditions were favorable and possibly use the proceeds to help finance his Senate campaign. Johnson was endorsed by: the Club for Growth, a fiscally conservative advocacy organization; former Wisconsin Republican Lt. Governor Margaret Farrow; Republican U.S. Senator Jim DeMint of South Carolina; and Wisconsin Republican U.S. Representatives Jim Sensenbrenner, Tom Petri and Paul Ryan. Businessman David Westlake was endorsed by the Republican Liberty Caucus. According to OpenSecrets, as of August 25, 2010, Johnson had invested $4.3 million of his own money into his campaign; this amount represented 71 percent of his campaign funds, while 27 percent of his campaign funds ($1.6 million) came from individual contributions.

=== Polling ===
Poll Source	Date(s) administered	Sample size	Margin of error	Ron Johnson	Dave Westlake	Other	Undecided
Public Policy Polling (report)	June 26–27, 2010	400	± 4.9%	49%	11%	––	40%

=== Results ===
Republican primary results
Party	Candidate	Votes	%
Republican	Ron Johnson	500,821	84.7%
Republican	David Westlake	61,287	10.4%
Republican	Stephen M. Finn	29,002	4.9%
Total votes		591,107	100.0%

== General election ==
=== Candidates ===
- Russ Feingold (D), incumbent U.S. senator
- Ron Johnson (R), businessman
- Dave Rutowski (I)
- Rob Taylor (I) self-described Constitution Party candidate

=== Campaign ===
Feingold's first television ad was a positive ad released in March. In July 2010, his second 2010 television election ad attacked Johnson for alleged support for offshore drilling in the Great Lakes. Johnson quickly countered Feingold with a television ad of his own. Feingold's logo was Moving Forward. In one ad, he emphasized independence and called himself a "penny pincher." Johnson argued that manufacturers and accountants were underrepresented in the U.S. Senate, and there were too many lawyers (57 out of 100 members, including Feingold). Feingold received the endorsements of the Milwaukee Journal Sentinel and Green Bay Press-Gazette. The Beloit Daily News endorsed Johnson.

=== Debates ===
- October 8 in Milwaukee
- October 11 in Wausau
- October 22 in Eau Claire on WQOW

=== Predictions ===
Source	Ranking	As of
Cook Political Report	Lean R (flip)	October 26, 2010
Rothenberg	Lean R (flip)	October 22, 2010
RealClearPolitics	Lean R (flip)	October 26, 2010
Sabato's Crystal Ball	Lean R (flip)	October 21, 2010
CQ Politics	Lean R (flip)	October 26, 2010

=== Polling ===
Poll source	Date(s) administered	Sample size	Margin of error	Russ Feingold (D)	Ron Johnson (R)	Other	Undecided
Rasmussen Reports	May 25, 2010	500	± 4.5%	46%	44%	3%	6%
Rasmussen Reports	June 21, 2010	500	± 4.5%	46%	45%	3%	6%
Public Policy Polling	June 26–27, 2010	638	± 3.9%	45%	43%	––	12%
Rasmussen Reports	July 13, 2010	750	± 4.0%	46%	47%	2%	6%
University of Wisconsin, Madison	July 15, 2010	500	± 3.9%	33%	28%	––	44%
Magellan Strategies	July 20, 2010	1,145	± 2.9%	45%	43%	3.7%	8%
Rasmussen Reports	July 27, 2010	500	± 4.0%	46%	48%	2%	5%
Rasmussen Reports	August 11, 2010	750	± 4.0%	46%	47%	2%	5%
Rasmussen Reports	August 24, 2010	750	± 4.0%	46%	47%	1%	5%
Rasmussen Reports	September 15, 2010	750	± 4.0%	44%	51%	1%	4%
Public Policy Polling	September 18–19, 2010	––	± 3.8%	41%	52%	––	7%
CNN/Time/Opinion Research	September 17–21, 2010	963	± 3.0%	45%	51%	2%	2%
McClatchy/Marist	September 26–28, 2010	806	± 3.5%	45%	52%	1%	3%
Rasmussen Reports	September 29, 2010	750	± 4.0%	42%	54%	2%	2%
We the People	September 29 – October 4, 2010	400	± 5.0%	41%	49%	––	––
We the People/Ispos	October 8, 2010	400	± 5.0%	44%	51%	––	––
Rasmussen Reports	October 11, 2010	750	± 4.0%	45%	52%	––	2%
CNN/Time/Opinion Research	October 8–12, 2010	1,506	± 2.5%	44%	52%	1%	––
St. Norbert College/WPR	October 12–15, 2010	402	± 5.0%	47%	49%	––	4%
Rasmussen Reports	October 25, 2010	750	± 4.0%	46%	53%	0%	1%
We the People	October 24–27, 2010	400	± 5.0%	44%	48%	––	6%
Public Policy Polling	October 26–28, 2010	1,372	± 2.6%	44%	53%	––	3%
Marist College	October 26–28, 2010	811	± 4.5%	45%	52%	1%	2%

Hypothetical polling

Poll source	Date(s) administered	Sample size	Margin of Error	Russ Feingold (D)	David Westlake (R)	Other	Undecided
Public Policy Polling (report)	June 26–27, 2010	638	± 3.9%	45%	38%	--	17%
Rasmussen Reports (report)	June 21, 2010	500	± 4.5%	47%	41%	4%	7%
Rasmussen Reports (report)	May 25, 2010	500	± 4.5%	47%	38%	7%	8%
Public Policy Polling (report)	March 23, 2010	700	± 3.7%	48%	31%	—	21%
Rasmussen Reports (report)	March 16, 2010	500	± 4.5%	51%	35%	5%	10%
Rasmussen Reports (report)	February 17, 2010	500	± 4.5%	47%	37%	6%	10%
Public Policy Polling (report)	November 20–22, 2009	767	± 3.5%	47%	32%	—	21%

Poll source	Date(s) administered	Sample size	Margin of Error	Russ Feingold (D)	Tommy Thompson (R)	Other	Undecided
WPRI (report)	September 27–29, 2009	700	± 3.8%	39%	43%	—	18%
Public Policy Polling (report)	November 20–22, 2009	767	± 3.5%	50%	41%	—	10%
Rasmussen Reports (report)	January 26, 2010	500	± 4.5%	43%	47%	6%	4%
Rasmussen Reports (report)	February 17, 2010	500	± 4.5%	43%	48%	3%	5%
WPRI (report)	March 9, 2010	600	± 4.0%	39%	51%	—	9%
Rasmussen Reports (report)	March 16, 2010	500	± 4.5%	45%	47%	3%	4%
Public Policy Polling (report)	March 23, 2010	700	± 3.7%	47%	44%	—	9%

Poll source	Date(s) administered	Sample size	Margin of Error	Russ Feingold (D)	Terrence Wall (R)	Other	Undecided
Public Policy Polling (report)	November 20–22, 2009	767	± 3.5%	48%	34%	—	19%
Rasmussen Reports (report)	February 17, 2010	500	± 4.5%	47%	39%	6%	7%
WPRI (report)	March 9, 2010	600	± 4.0%	47%	32%	6%	7%
Rasmussen Reports (report)	March 16, 2010	500	± 4.5%	49%	40%	3%	9%
Public Policy Polling (report)	March 23, 2010	700	± 3.7%	48%	34%	—	18%

=== Fundraising ===
Through December 31, 2010:

Candidate (party)	Net receipts	Disbursements	Beginning cash	Latest cash on hand	Debt
Russ Feingold (D)	$13,947,563	$15,544,093	$2,516,119	$919,585	$0
Ron Johnson (R)	$15,509,297	$15,316,651	$0	$192,646	$8,708,465
Source: Federal Election Commission

=== Results ===
General election results
Party	Candidate	Votes	%	±%
Republican	Ron Johnson	1,125,999	51.86%	+7.75%
Democratic	Russ Feingold (incumbent)	1,020,958	47.02%	−8.33%
Constitution	Rob Taylor	23,473	1.08%	N/A
Write-in		901	0.04%	N/A
Total votes		2,170,430	100.00%	-26.4%
Republican gain from Democratic				

==== Counties that flipped Democratic to Republican ====
- Barron (largest city: Rice Lake)
- Brown (largest city: Green Bay)
- Burnett (largest village: Grantsburg)
- Clark (largest city: Neillsville)
- Chippewa (largest city: Chippewa Falls)
- Iron (largest city: Hurley)
- Jefferson (largest city: Watertown)
- Kewaunee (largest city: Algoma)
- Langlade (largest city: Antigo)
- Manitowoc (largest city: Manitowoc)
- Marathon (largest city: Wausau)
- Monroe (largest city: Sparta)
- Oneida (largest city: Rhinelander)
- Outagamie (largest city: Appleton)
- Rusk (largest city: Ladysmith)
- Washburn (largest city: Spooner)
- Buffalo (largest city: Mondovi)
- Columbia (largest city: Portage)
- Door (largest city: Sturgeon Bay)
- Dunn (largest city: Menomonie)
- Forest (largest city: Crandon)
- Grant (largest city: Platteville)
- Jackson (largest city: Black River Falls)
- Juneau (largest city: Mauston)
- Kenosha (largest city: Kenosha)
- Lafayette (largest city: Darlington)
- Lincoln (largest city: Merrill)
- Pepin (largest city: Durand)
- Price (largest city: Park Falls)
- Racine (largest city: Racine)
- Richland (largest city: Richland Center)
- Sawyer (largest city: Hayward)
- Trempealeau (largest city: Arcadia)
- Winnebago (largest city: Oshkosh)
- Adams (largest city: Adams)
- Polk (largest city: Amery)
- St. Croix (largest city: Hudson)
- Taylor (largest city: Medford)
