= Phil Montgomery =

American politician

Chair of the Public Service Commission of Wisconsin
- In office April 4, 2011 – March 1, 2015
- Appointed by: Scott Walker
- Preceded by: Eric Callisto
- Succeeded by: Ellen Nowak

Member of the Public Service Commission of Wisconsin
- In office April 4, 2011 – March 6, 2017
- Appointed by: Scott Walker
- Preceded by: Mark Meyer
- Succeeded by: Lon Roberts

Member of the Wisconsin State Assembly from the 4th district
- In office January 4, 1999 – January 3, 2011
- Preceded by: Mark Green
- Succeeded by: Chad Weininger

Personal details
- Born: July 7, 1957 (age 69) Hammond, Indiana, U.S.
- Party: Republican
- Children: 2
- Education: University of Houston–Downtown (BS)

Phil Montgomery (born July 7, 1957) is an American engineer and former Republican politician who served on the Public Service Commission of Wisconsin from 2011 until the end of his six-year term in 2017. During his term on the PSC he served as chair from 2011 until 2015. He previously served as a member of the Wisconsin State Assembly, representing the 4th district from 1999 until 2011.

== Early life and education ==
He was born in Hammond, Indiana on July 7, 1957. He attended Thornton Fractional North High School in Calumet City, Illinois, and earned a Bachelor of Science in Business and Commerce from the University of Houston–Downtown in 1988.

== Career ==
After graduating from college, Montgomery worked as a systems engineer.

As member of the Wisconsin State Assembly from 1998 to 2010, Montgomery served on the Special Committee on Clean Energy Jobs, Joint Committee on Finance, Assembly Committee on Energy and Utilities, Joint Committee on Information Policy and Technology, and served on other related committees in the Assembly and on the Board of Directors of the Wisconsin Public Utility Institute.

During the 2007–2008 legislative session, Montgomery authored legislation providing statewide video franchising. The governor and others supported the bill. The bill provided a much simpler process for a franchise, while eliminating some traditional franchise requirements such as service to almost everyone in the territory. The bill had bipartisan support, with the La Crosse Tribune noting Democratic Party chairman Joe Weinke registered to lobby for AT&T while the bill was before the Democratic controlled Senate. In 2006, when the proposal was being developed, AT&T contributed $2,250 to Montgomery's campaign. He also supported passage of the Great Lakes Compact and the use of renewable energy.

Montgomery voted against AB61, a bill that "prohibits any incumbent partisan elective state official from accepting any political contribution from the first Monday in January of each odd-numbered year through the date of enactment of the biennial budget act." Montgomery had introduced and strongly supported AB 285, a bill that would allow increases in the cost of basic telephone service.

== Personal life ==
Montgomery lives in Middleton, Wisconsin He is married and has two children.
