= Paul Jadin =

American politician (born 1955)

1st Chief Executive Officer of the Wisconsin Economic Development Corporation
- In office July 1, 2011 – October 2012
- Governor: Scott Walker
- Preceded by: Position established
- Succeeded by: Reed Hall

Secretary of the Wisconsin Department of Commerce
- In office January 3, 2011 – July 1, 2011
- Governor: Scott Walker
- Preceded by: Dick Leinenkugel
- Succeeded by: Position abolishshed

46th Mayor of Green Bay, Wisconsin
- In office April 1995 – April 1, 2003
- Preceded by: Sam Halloin
- Succeeded by: Jim Schmitt

Personal details
- Born: May 2, 1955 (age 71) Kewaunee, Wisconsin, U.S.
- Spouse: Jane Stangel
- Children: 4
- Education: Northwestern University (B.A.); Florida State University (Master's degree)

Paul F. Jadin (born May 2, 1955) is a retired American politician from Green Bay, Wisconsin. He was the last secretary of the Wisconsin Department of Commerce and the first C.E.O. of its successor, the Wisconsin Economic Development Corporation, during the administration of Governor Scott Walker. He previously served as the 46th mayor of Green Bay, Wisconsin, from 1995 to 2003, and the C.E.O. of the Green Bay Area Chamber of Commerce.

== Electoral history ==
Jadin won his first general election with 55% of the vote and was the first mayor of Green Bay in over fifty years to run for re-election unopposed.

Prior to his election, Jadin had been the city's personnel director. After leaving office, he became president of the Green Bay Area Chamber of Commerce. He resigned the position on December 28, 2010. Shortly thereafter, he was appointed as the Secretary of the Wisconsin Department of Commerce in Governor Scott Walker's cabinet.

In September 2012, CEO/Secretary Paul Jadin resigned from his position in the former Wisconsin Department of Commerce, which had become the Wisconsin Economic Development Corporation, to take a position with Thrive, which serves an eight-county region around Madison, Wisconsin.

== Family ==
Jadin married Jane M. Stangel on August 27, 1982. They have four children.

Government offices
Preceded by Dick Leinenkugel	Secretary of the Wisconsin Department of Commerce; January 3, 2011 – July 1, 2011	Department abolished
Department established	Chief Executive Officer of the Wisconsin Economic Development Corporation; July 1, 2011 – October 2012	Succeeded by Reed Hall
Political offices
Preceded by Sam Halloin	Mayor of Green Bay, Wisconsin; 1995 - 2003	Succeeded by Jim Schmitt
