= Eric Genrich =

Mayor of Green Bay since 2019

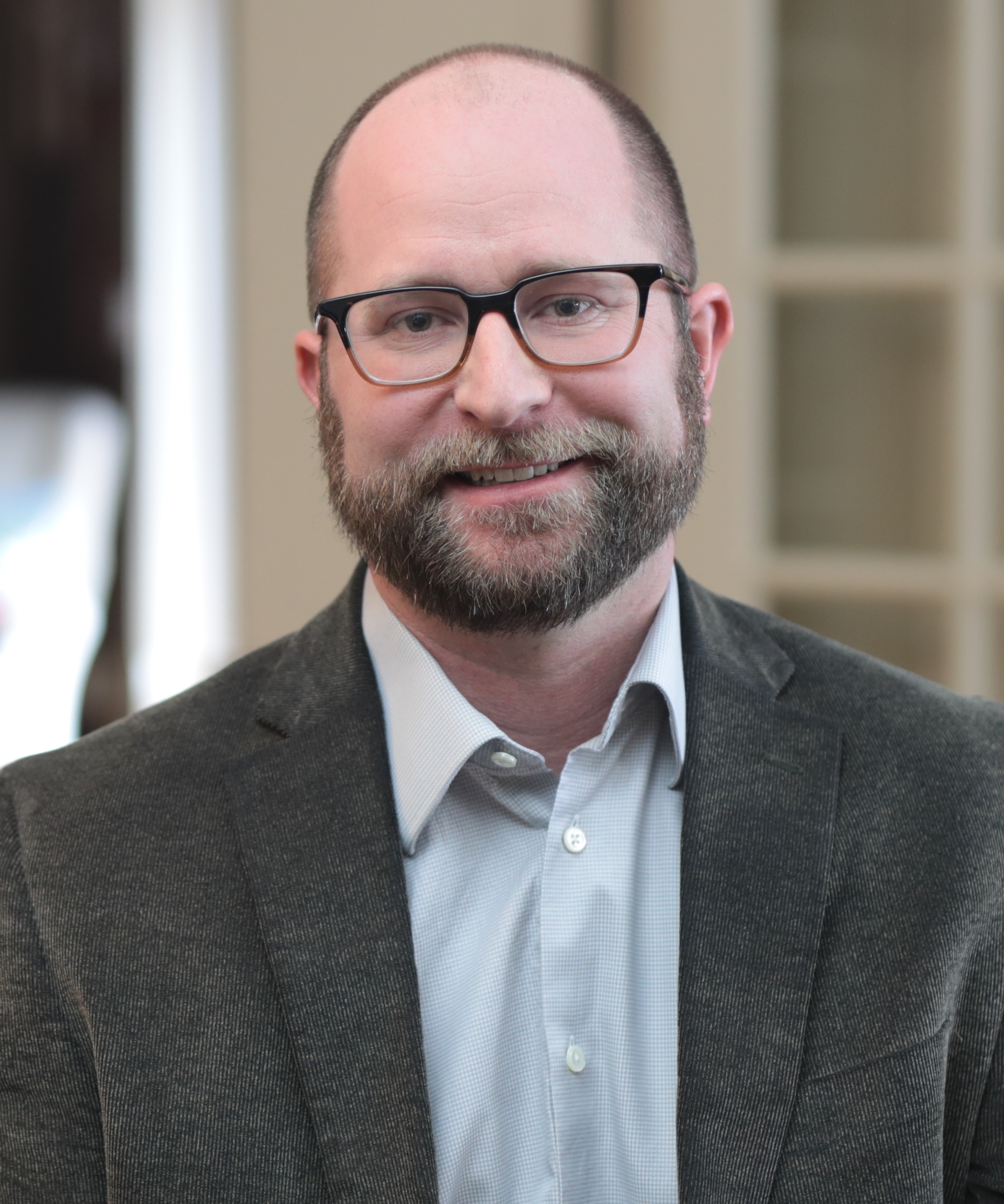

48th Mayor of Green Bay
- Incumbent
- Assumed office April 15, 2019
- Preceded by: Jim Schmitt

Member of the Wisconsin State Assembly from the 90th district
- In office January 7, 2013 – January 7, 2019
- Preceded by: Karl Van Roy
- Succeeded by: Staush Gruszynski

Personal details
- Born: October 8, 1979 (age 46) Green Bay, Wisconsin, U.S.
- Party: Democratic
- Spouse: Emily A. Kelley
- Children: 2
- Education: University of Wisconsin–Madison (BA); University of Wisconsin–Milwaukee (MLIS)
- Website: Official website

Eric Genrich (/ˈɡɛnrɪk/ GHEN-rik; born October 8, 1979) is an American politician who has served as the mayor of Green Bay, Wisconsin, since 2019. Genrich previously represented Green Bay in the Wisconsin State Assembly from 2013 until 2019.

== Early life and education ==
Born in Green Bay, Wisconsin, Genrich graduated from Notre Dame Academy in 1998. He went on to attend the University of Wisconsin–Madison, where he majored in history and sociology, earning his bachelor's degree in 2002. He earned a Master of Library and Information Science from the University of Wisconsin–Milwaukee in 2010.

== Career ==
After graduating from the University of Wisconsin, Genrich was employed for six years as a legislative aide to State Senator Dave Hansen. He was subsequently employed as a district representative for Congressman Steve Kagen. After Kagen left office in 2011, Genrich was employed as an IT librarian at the Brown County Library, where he worked until his election to the Assembly in 2012.

=== Wisconsin Legislature ===
The 2011 Wisconsin gerrymander (2011 Wisc. Act 43) significantly altered the political makeup of the Wisconsin's 90th Assembly district, removing suburban Howard and Suamico, and packing in more of Green Bay's population. In March 2012, 90th district incumbent State Representative Karl Van Roy announced he would not seek re-election in the new district, Genrich announced his candidacy for the seat a month later.

Genrich defeated Republican activist and businessman David VanderLeest in the 2012 general election, taking 60.2% of the vote. He was subsequently re-elected in 2014, defeating attorney Eric Wimberger, and was unopposed in 2016.

Genrich, as a Democrat, served in the minority during his six years in the Wisconsin State Assembly. He was a member of the committees on education, on energy and utilities, on insurance, on regulatory licensing reform, and on science and technology.

=== Mayor of Green Bay ===
In March 2018, he announced his candidacy for mayor of Green Bay in the 2019 election, in a bid to replace Jim Schmitt, who was not seeking another term as mayor. Genrich and Brown County Supervisor Patrick Buckley advanced from a primary election, and Genrich defeated Buckley with 57.1% of the vote.

During the COVID-19 pandemic, Mayor Genrich was one of several Wisconsin mayors and politicians who sought alternative voting accommodations to comply with COVID-19 lockdown procedures. Genrich and the city of Green Bay filed a lawsuit in the United States District Court for the Eastern District of Wisconsin about two weeks before the April 7 elections, stating that they did not have the capacity to carry out the election as directed, and asking for an injunction to delay the election until June. The suit was quickly dismissed by the court, which said it lacked jurisdiction to rule on the matter. A subsequent order from Wisconsin Governor Tony Evers to postpone the election also fell in the Wisconsin Supreme Court. The election went forward as scheduled on April 7, though with less than 10% of their normal election workers. Brown County Clerk Sandy Juno offered to allocate Wisconsin National Guard personnel to manage polling stations, but Green Bay (along with other neighboring municipalities) refused, citing a lack of training. As a result of the personnel shortages, Green Bay could operate only two of their 31 in-person polling locations, and had long lines of voters waiting to cast their ballots.

== Personal life ==
Genrich and his wife, Emily (née Kelley), live on Green Bay's east side with their two children, Amelia and Henry.

== Electoral history ==
=== Wisconsin Assembly (2012, 2014, 2016) ===
Wisconsin Assembly, 90th district election, 2012
Party	Candidate	Votes	%	±%
General election, November 6, 2012
Democratic	Eric Genrich	11,353	60.21%	+18.69%
Republican	David VanderLeest	7,432	39.41%	−19.00%
	Scattering	71	0.38%	
Plurality		3,921	20.79%	+3.89%
Total votes		18,856	100.0%	+1.59%
Democratic gain from Republican		Swing	37.70%	

Wisconsin Assembly, 90th District election, 2014
Party	Candidate	Votes	%	±%
General election, November 4, 2014
Democratic	Eric Genrich (incumbent)	7,953	54.94%	−5.27%
Republican	Eric Wimberger	5,342	36.90%	−2.51%
Independent	Shae Sortwell	1,164	8.04%	
	Scattering	18	0.12%	
Plurality		2,611	18.04%	-2.76%
Total votes		14,477	100.0%	-23.22%
Democratic hold				

=== Green Bay mayor (2019, 2023) ===
Green Bay, Wisconsin mayoral election, 2019
Party	Candidate	Votes	%	±%
Nonpartisan primary, February 19, 2019 (top-two)
Nonpartisan	Eric Genrich	4,505	43.61%	
Nonpartisan	Patrick Buckley	1,871	18.11%	
Nonpartisan	Patrick M. Evans	1,799	17.41%	
Nonpartisan	Guy Zima	853	8.26%	
Nonpartisan	Joe Moore	525	5.08%	
Nonpartisan	Mark Steuer	507	4.91%	
Nonpartisan	Nick Mortensen	166	1.61%	
Nonpartisan	Paul Boucher	68	0.66%	
	Scattering	37	0.36%	
Total votes		10,331	100.0%	
General election, April 2, 2019
Nonpartisan	Eric Genrich	11,421	57.61%	
Nonpartisan	Patrick Buckley	8,296	41.85%	
	Scattering	108	0.54%	
Plurality		3,125	15.76%	+10.17%
Total votes		19,825	100.0%	+22.16%

Wisconsin State Assembly
Preceded by Karl Van Roy	Member of the Wisconsin State Assembly from the 90th district 2013 – 2019	Succeeded by Staush Gruszynski
Political offices
Preceded by Jim Schmitt	Mayor of Green Bay, Wisconsin; 2019 – present	Incumbent
