= David Steffen =

American politician (born 1971)

Member of the Wisconsin State Assembly from the 4th district
- Incumbent
- Assumed office January 6, 2015
- Preceded by: Chad Weininger

Personal details
- Born: October 12, 1971 (age 54) Ashwaubenon, Wisconsin, U.S.
- Party: Republican
- Children: 1
- Education: University of Wisconsin–Madison (BA)
- Profession: Politician, small business owner
- Website: Official website Campaign website

David Steffen (born October 12, 1971) is an American businessman and Republican politician from Green Bay, Wisconsin. He is a member of the Wisconsin State Assembly, representing Wisconsin's 4th Assembly district since 2015. He also played an important role in the 2001–2003 renovation of Lambeau Field.

== Early life and career ==
David Steffen was born on October 12, 1971, in Ashwaubenon, Wisconsin. During his teenage years he attended Ashwaubenon High School, graduating in 1990. Following his graduation from high school he attended the University of Wisconsin–Madison, where he obtained a bachelor of arts degree in political science, graduating in 1995. Following his graduation, Steffen did work in the private sector and acted as a lobbyist for several years.

In 2000, Steffen, then executive director of Team Lambeau–an organization founded to keep Lambeau Field open–was hired by the Green Bay Packers to help them attain a $295 million expansion of the field. The proposal, passed by the state legislature, involved implementing a 0.5% sales tax in Brown County, as well as additional fees on personal seat licenses on season ticket holders. The proposal was then ratified by voters in Brown County with a 53%-47% margin.

During his time in education and non-profit sectors, he served as Director of Operations for the Legislative Leadership Institute Academy of Foreign Affairs in partnership with the Irish American University located in Dublin, Ireland.

== Political career ==
Steffen began his political career in 2007, when he was elected to the Howard, Wisconsin board of trustees. He would then be elected to the Brown County board of Supervisors in 2012. He served in both of these roles until 2015, when he was sworn in as a state representative.

In 2014, Steffen ran for the open 4th state assembly district, which was being vacated by Chad Weininger. In the primary he faced business owners Jeff Goelz and Corrie Campbell.

In 2016, following the killing of five police officers in Dallas, Steffen introduced legislation that would make it a hate crime to target police officers in the state.

In 2020, Steffen proposed legislation that would dissolve the Lambeau Field Stadium District, which maintains the stadium at Lambeau Field. His proposal would additionally transfer ownership of the field to Green Bay, Wisconsin and see funds and assets redistributed to residents of the city and surrounding county. Steffen argued that the legislation would simplify the financial situation between the city and the Green Bay Packers and eliminate administrative costs. He also argued that the district had served its purpose and completed all of the objectives which had been assigned to it by the legislature upon its creation. In response to this legislation, the Green Bay Packers threatened a lawsuit, arguing that the legislation would violate their lease. To avoid a lawsuit, Steffen withdrew his proposal in exchange for further agreements regarding transparency and oversight of the board.

Following the defeat of Donald Trump in the 2020 presidential election, Steffen joined other Republicans in efforts to attempts to overturn the 2020 presidential election.

In 2024, Steffen faced vice chair of the Oconto County Republican Party Darwin Behnke, the father of fellow representative Elijah Behnke. During the campaign, Steffen criticized Behnke's campaign for financial issues. The campaign also proved to be divisive at the county level, as Steffen had the support of the Brown County Republicans whereas Behnke drew support from the Oconto County Republicans. Steffen drew criticism from politicians in the more rural Oconto County as he was seen as inexperienced on rural issues. Steffen defeated Behnke by 33 points and faced Democrat Jane Benson in the general election, who he defeated by 32 points.

== Personal life ==
Steffen resides in Howard, Wisconsin with his wife, son, and their dog, named Ellie.

== Electoral history ==
=== Wisconsin Assembly (2014–present) ===
Year	Election	Date	Elected				Defeated				Total	Plurality
2014	Primary	Aug. 12	David Steffen	Republican	2,359	59.05%	Jeff Goelz	Rep.	1,038	25.98%	3,995	1,321
2014	Primary	Aug. 12	David Steffen	Republican	2,359	59.05%	Corrie Campbell	Rep.	593	14.84%	3,995	1,321
2014	General	Nov. 4	David Steffen	Republican	14,467	58.99%	Chris Plaunt	Dem.	10,026	40.88%	24,524	4,441
2016	General	Nov. 8	David Steffen (inc)	Republican	17,817	59.65%	Tony Lee	Dem.	12,016	40.23%	29,867	5,801
2018	General	Nov. 6	David Steffen (inc)	Republican	15,291	54.81%	Terry Lee	Dem.	12,585	45.11%	27,899	2,706
2020	General	Nov. 3	David Steffen (inc)	Republican	17,811	52.96%	Kathy A. Hinkfuss	Dem.	15,804	46.99%	33,630	2,007
2022	General	Nov. 8	David Steffen (inc)	Republican	15,348	55.49%	Derek Teague	Dem.	12,287	44.42%	27,661	3,061
2024	Primary	Aug. 13	David Steffen (inc)	Republican	6,099	66.59%	Darwin Behnke	Rep.	3,040	33.20%	9,158	3,059
2024	General	Nov. 5	David Steffen (inc)	Republican	24,629	66.15%	Jane Benson	Dem.	12,579	33.78%	37,234	12,050

Wisconsin State Assembly
Preceded by Chad Weininger	Member of the Wisconsin State Assembly from the 4th district January 6, 2015 – present	Incumbent
