= Terrence Wall =

American real estate developer

Terrence R. Wall
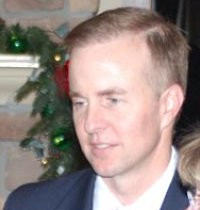

Personal details
- Born: 1964 (age 61–62) Elgin, Illinois
- Party: Republican
- Spouse: Helen
- Children: Katie, Maddie
- Education: University of Wisconsin-Madison
- Occupation: Real estate developer, business owner, politician

Terrence Wall (born 1964) is a real estate developer and politician in Madison, Wisconsin. Wall founded two real estate companies: T. Wall Properties, LLC, and T. Wall Enterprises. In 2010, Wall ran an unsuccessful campaign for Wisconsin Senate, withdrawing from the race before the primary elections.

== Biography ==
=== Early life ===
Wall was born in 1964 in Elgin, Illinois. He was born with contracted aorta. He had to undergo three months of treatment. He was raised in Madison, Wisconsin. He earned the Eagle Scout award from the Boy Scouts of America. He graduated from Edgewood High School and attended University of Wisconsin-Madison, graduating in 1987 with a degree in economics. He continued at the University of Wisconsin-Madison Business School where he studied under James Graaskamp and obtained a master's degree in real estate appraisal and investment in 1989.

=== Business ===
In 1989, with his father's help in obtaining and securing loans, Wall founded T. Wall Properties LLC. The company maintained one of the largest office space portfolios in Wisconsin for a time. Following the real estate crash of 2010, T. Wall Properties' board voted to remove Wall as the CEO of the firm in 2012. In 2014, the name of T. Wall Properties LLC was changed to Vanta Commercial Properties and the majority of its portfolio was liquidated. After being removed from T. Wall Properties, Wall launched T. Wall Enterprises with a focus on the development of high-end apartment buildings in the Madison area.

=== Politics ===
Wall ran a campaign for U.S. Senate in 2010 to challenge the Democrat Russ Feingold. He ended his campaign in late May shortly after his Republican challenger and the eventual winner, Ron Johnson, secured the endorsement of the Wisconsin Republican Party. In 2021, Terrance accused local assessors of bribery for bringing bite sized Snickers bars to local meetings. He filed a complaint with the Board of Review claiming the gesture was an ethics violation.

== Charitable activities and community involvement ==
Wall has served as the county executive's representative to the Dane County Community Development Block Grant Commission as well as the Mayor's Advisory Board. For several years he contributed a monthly column, "Up Against the Wall", to In Business Madison, a local business magazine. In the column, Wall discussed the overlapping of local, political, and business issues.

Wall has been actively involved in local charitable causes including the Children's Carousel at the Henry Vilas Zoo, the Glacier's Edge Boy Scouts of America council office building, and the Tenney Park Pavilion. He was also a lead donor in the construction of the American Family Children's Hospital, the East Side Community Center, and the renovation of Edgewood High School of the Sacred Heart. He has also been active in Boy Scouts of America, having been both a Scoutmaster and a Council President.
