= Chad Weininger =

21st century American politician

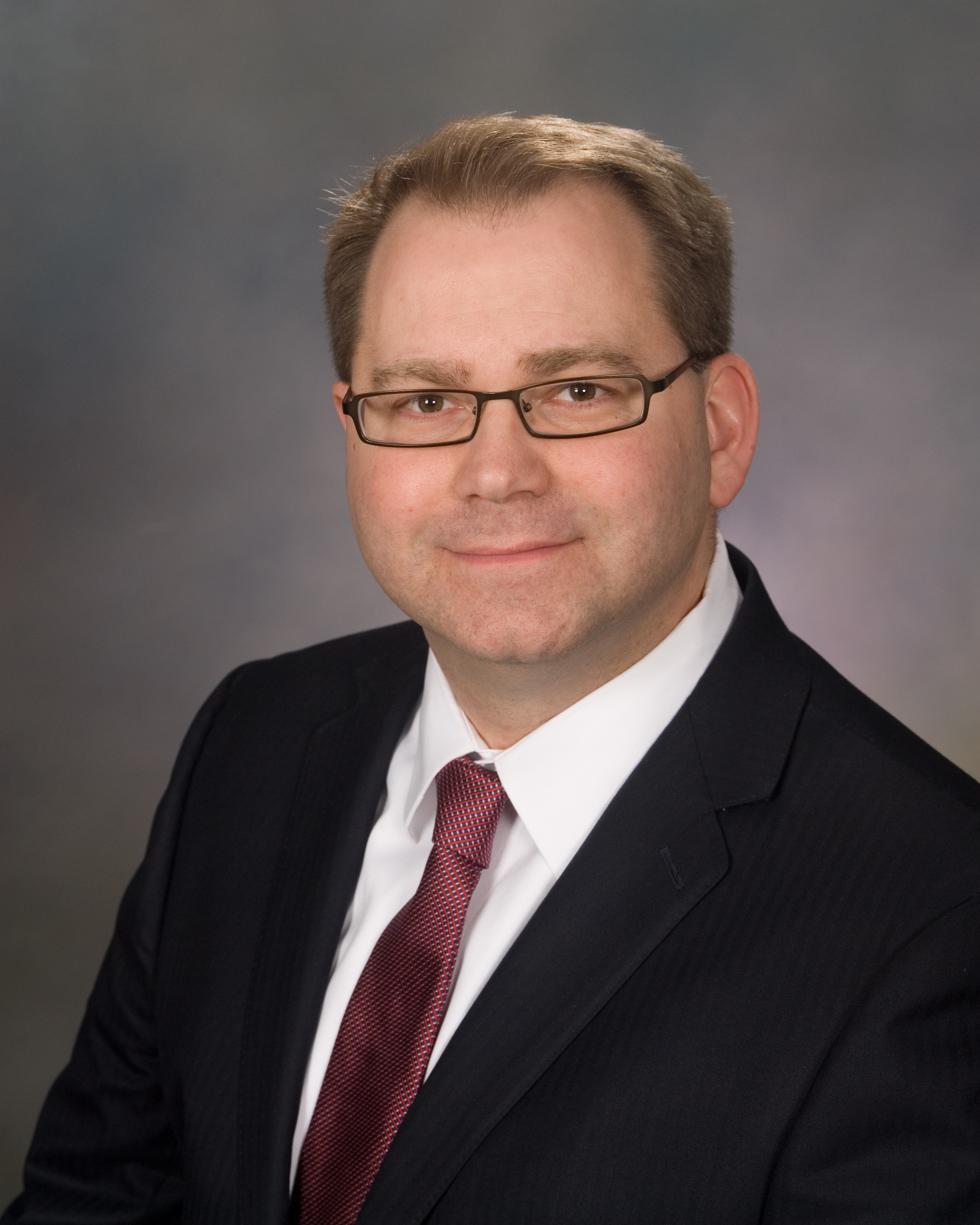
- Weininger in 2011

Member of the Wisconsin State Assembly from the 4th district
- In office January 3, 2011 – January 7, 2015
- Preceded by: Phil Montgomery
- Succeeded by: David Steffen

Personal details
- Born: February 7, 1972 (age 54) Green Bay, Wisconsin, U.S
- Party: Republican
- Education: Cardinal Stritch University (BBA); St. Norbert College (MBA)
- Profession: Politician & Business Owner

Chad Weininger (born February 7, 1972) is an American business owner and politician who served as a member of the Wisconsin State Assembly from the 4th district.

== Early life and education ==
Born in Green Bay, Wisconsin, Weininger was a Green Bay Area Soap Box Derby Champion in 1983 (Junior Division) and 1984 (Senior Division). Cablevision produced a documentary, Follow Me to Akron, about young Weininger's national Soap Box Derby competition and winning the R.G. Canning outstanding Youth Award in 1984. He would finish racing in National Derby Rallies and serve as a co-pilot for disabled racers.

Weininger attended Green Bay Public Elementary Schools and then graduate from Ashwaubenon High School. He earned a BBA from St. Norbert College in business administration with a double major in political science and a M.B.A. from Cardinal Stritch University.

In high school Weininger would become president of ‘Leaders in Business’ a Junior Achievement Company sponsors by Associate Kellogg Bank and would then start his first company as a senior.

== Career ==
=== Public service ===
In 2011, he was one of the Future 15 & Young Professionals award recipients through the Greater Green Bay Area Chamber of Commerce. He served on the Board of Directors of On Broadway Inc., and was elected as Secretary in 2010. He also served on the Oral Health Partnership Board of Directors in 2017, 2018 and 2019, which focuses on dental serves to uninsured and under insured children in the community. He serves on the Joint Board of Review for Tax Increment Finance Districts for the Cities of DePere, Green Bay, Villages of Ashwaubenon, Hobart, Howard, Bellevue, and Towns of Lawrence and Ledgeview. In addition he service on the Brown County Revolving Loan Program that administers the Wisconsin Revolving Loan Funds and Federal Community Development Block Grant Funds to grow area businesses. He was appointed by Green Bay Mayor Paul Jadin and confirmed by the Green Bay City Council to serve on Zoning and Planning Board of Appeals and Green Bay's Planning Commission on May 1, 2001.

Weininger served as a Legislative aide to State Senator Robert Cowles, Wisconsin's 2nd District until December 1998 when he transitioned to District Director of newly elected Congressman Mark Green of Wisconsin's 8th Confessional District. Weininger would champion two yearly business development initiatives that included the Northeastern Wisconsin Global Trade Conference and Federal Contracting Opportunities in conjunction with the Wisconsin Procurement Institute. He would be recognized for his efforts in assisting Appleton Police Officers supply aid to East Timor which suffered extreme violence after they claimed independence from Indonesia. In addition, he was known for leading the Congressman’s efforts to find the Linda E fishing vessel that sank on the Great Lakes after the Congressman was elected when the Coast Guard refused to continue their search. As the Deputy Chief of staff he to part in a Congressional Delegation (CODEL) to Taiwan during heighten tensions between the Republic of China (Taiwan) and the People’s Republic of China (Mainland China). He would oversee constituent services and district operations until he became Deputy Chief of Staff to the Congressman prior to becoming Chief of Staff to the Mayor of Green Bay in 2005. Weininger left the City in 2008 to serve in the United States Foreign Service in Africa for one year. During that time he served as an international election observe in Tarmine along the southern Kenya boarder as a member of parliaments death.

He would return to the City of Green Bay and become confirm unanimously by the city council as Green Bay's City Clerk to manage elections and business licensing and special assessments. As City Clerk, he served on the Board of Review for property tax appeals and championed ethics reform in the city of Green Bay. On February 1, 2011 the City of Green Bay passed a commendation honoring him for his service to the city.

=== Politics ===
In 2010, Weininger was elected to the Wisconsin State Legislature serving the 4th Assembly district of Wisconsin, with 67% of the vote. He defeated Democrat Sam Dunlop who unsuccessfully challenged Republican Phil Montgomery in 2008. Re-elected in 2012, Weininger chose not to run for re-election in 2014, instead accepting a post as director of administration for Brown County, Wisconsin. In 2014, he donated his salary as a State Representative during the time he served as the Director of Administration. He was succeeded in office by David Steffen, a former Ashwaubenon high school classmate.

During his first term Representative Weininger served as Vice Chair of Insurance, Utilities & Energy, and Campaign Finance & Election Reform Committees. The following sessions, he would be on Energy & Utilities, Urban Education, Financial Institutions, Campaign & Election, and Information Policy & Technology committees as well as serve as Vice Chair of Insurance, and Chairman of State Affairs and Chairman of International Trade & Commerce. During his first year in office, Weininger received the 1st, the 'Henry S. Baird Legislature of the Year Award' by the Municipal Issues Committee of Advance, the Economic Development organization of the Greater Green Bay Chamber for a law that enables communities to create TIF districts to cross municipal boards for shared economic development projects. Prior to leaving he would champion two other major economic development initiatives to revitalize Wisconsin's aging downtown, waterfronts and main streets through the Historic Tax Credit which helped municipalities compete for out of state funding and developers, and PACE Energy Financing law which allowed older buildings to be redeveloped by financing energy conservation savings.

He also received the Freshman Legislative Leadership Award by the Wisconsin State Telecommunication Association for his rural broadband work on the Utilities & Energy Committee. During his term received awards from Wisconsin Manufacturing and Commerce, Working for Wisconsin Award; The American Conservation Union, Defender of Liberty; Metropolitan Milwaukee Association of Commerce, Champion of Commerce, Dairy Business Association Legislative Excellence Award, Wisconsin Grocers Association, Friend of Grocers Award, Wisconsin Builders Association, Friend of Housing.

==== Mayoral race ====
In 2023, Weininger lost a run against incumbent Green Bay mayor Eric Genrich, who drew 13,507 votes (52.85%) to Weininger's 11,999 (46.95%). Weininger had been working as Brown County's administration director, under Brown County Executive Troy Streckenbach, since 2014.

=== Business ===
Weininger owned businesses in real estate, construction, retail and currently owns a consulting business. He is a licensed real estate broker in the state of Wisconsin, and was first licensed in 2005.
