= Public Service Commission of Wisconsin =

Public utilities commission of the United States

Agency overview
- Jurisdiction: Wisconsin
- Headquarters: 4822 Madison Yards Way Madison, Wisconsin 53705-9100
- Agency executive: Summer Strand, Chairperson
- Website: http://psc.wi.gov

The Public Service Commission of Wisconsin is an independent regulatory agency responsible for regulating public utilities in the energy, telecommunications, gas, and water companies located in the U.S. state of Wisconsin. As of 2021, the agency regulated more than 1,100 electric, natural gas, telephone, water, and water/sewer utilities.

The commission consists of three full-time commissioners who are appointed by the governor and confirmed by the Wisconsin State Senate in staggered six-year terms. The current commissioners are Summer Strand, Kristy Nieto, and Marcus Hawkins.

The commissioners are assisted by a staff of auditors, accountants, engineers, rate analysts, attorneys, planners, research analysts, economists, consumer specialists, and other support personnel. The staff is divided into several divisions: the Division of Business Operations and Office Management, the Division of Digital Access, Consumer and Environmental Affairs, the Division of Energy Regulation and Analysis, the Division of Water Utility Regulation and Analysis, and the Office of General Counsel.

In Wisconsin, most activities of the 28 electric cooperatives are not under the jurisdiction of the PSC.

== Commissioners ==
| Position | Name | Took office | Term ends | Appointer | |
|---|---|---|---|---|---|
| Chair | Summer Strand | January 2024 | 2026 | Tony Evers | Dem. |
| Commissioner | Summer Strand | March 6, 2023 | 2029 | Tony Evers | Dem. |
| Commissioner | Kristy Nieto | February 2, 2024 | 2030 | Tony Evers | Dem. |
| Commissioner | Marcus Hawkins | April 8, 2024 | 2030 | Tony Evers | Dem. |

== Notable rate cases ==
In 2014, the Public Service Commission was subject to atypical scrutiny in three utility rate cases. The primary issue in the three cases was distributed generation. Ratepayers drew widespread opposition to increases in fixed fees for all customers.

The largest utility of the three, We Energies, also proposed increasing fees on customers who generate their own power, like those with rooftop solar. The case generated thousands of public comments opposing the changes. Around 500 ratepayers came out to protest the rate case at the public hearing in October.

The Public Service Commission's staff analyst on these cases, Corey Singletary, testified that We Energies had not provided enough evidence to justify the changes they requested. Through discovery, We Energies was forced to reveal that it had commissioned and paid for a study stating that net metering customers provided a net benefit to all ratepayers, contradicting their claims in the rate case.

Despite the lack of evidence to support the changes, the Commission voted to approve the requested increase to the fixed charges both for all customers and the additional charge for self-generators. Chairman Phil Montgomery and Commissioner Ellen Nowak supported the change, while Commissioner Eric Callisto dissented.

== Controversy ==
Public Service Commissioners are prohibited by Wisconsin statute from communicating with parties with a substantial interest in the outcome of a pending case. There have been two major scandals involving violations of this law, both involving We Energies.

=== 1997 ===
During a pending utility merger between Wisconsin Energy Corp. and Northern States Power, the Commission defended itself against allegations of improper communication between one of the Commissioners and utility executives regarding the merger.

=== 2014 ===
During the pending We Energies rate case, Commissioner Ellen Nowak appeared to violate both the ex parte rules and the law requiring Commissioners to remain impartial. In both March and June, Commissioner Nowak appeared on panels for conferences hosted by the Edison Electric Institute. In both panels, she advised her utilities on rate making practices. In the June panel, titled "Utility Regulation and Success in a Low Growth Economy," she appeared alongside We Energies CEO Gale Klappa. There was also a question as to whether any other communication occurred between Commissioner Nowak and Klappa or other utility staff.

Groups and individual ratepayers called for Commissioner Nowak to recuse herself from the case due to her lack of impartiality.

== See also ==
- Public Utilities Commission
