= Dick Leinenkugel =

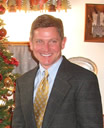
- Leinenkugel in 2009

Wisconsin Secretary of Commerce
- In office September 29, 2008 – April 6, 2010
- Governor: Jim Doyle
- Preceded by: Jack Fischer
- Succeeded by: Aaron Olver

Personal details
- Born: 1958 (age 67–68) Chippewa Falls, Wisconsin
- Party: Republican
- Spouse: Jean Kunz (m. 1984)
- Education: Marquette University (B.A.)

Richard Leinenkugel (born 1957 in Chippewa Falls, Wisconsin) is an American politician and businessman in the State of Wisconsin. He was the Wisconsin Secretary of Commerce, and was vice president of sales and marketing for the Chippewa Falls Beer Company, which is a subsidiary of MillerCoors LLC. He was also group manager for specialty and craft brands of Miller Brewing Company. In 2010, he briefly ran for the United States Senate.

== Family and early career ==
Leinkenkugel was born in 1958 in Chippewa Falls, Wisconsin, the fourth of five children. As a teenager, Leinenkugel started in his family’s beer business, giving tours at the Leinenkugels brewery.

Leinenkugel graduated from Chippewa Falls High School in 1976, and attended and graduated magna cum laude from Marquette University with a bachelor's degree in business administration. He also served as a U.S. Marine Corps officer.

Leinenkugel was deployed twice on Naval amphibious ships as part of a Marine Amphibious Unit (MAU), leading 39 Marines as a supply officer and holding a 30-day inventory supply for a Marines battalion. Serving in the Philippines, Australia, Malaysia, Singapore, Hong Kong and Korea, he also trained and conducted amphibious operations in the Western Pacific Ocean and Indian Ocean including Somalia and Oman. After serving in the Marines, Leinenkugel was elected to the Waukesha County Board of Supervisors for a three-year term.

Leinenkugel married Jean Kunz in 1984, with whom he has three children.

== Wisconsin Secretary of Commerce nomination ==
On September 5, 2008, Governor of Wisconsin Jim Doyle appointed Leinenkugel as the Secretary of the Department of Commerce. He resigned from the position effective April 9, 2010, to pursue a new opportunity.

== United States Senate race ==
In April 2010, Leinenkugel declared his short-lived candidacy for the U.S. Senate seat held by the incumbent senator, Democrat Russ Feingold, in the 2010 United States Senate Election. Although Leinenkugel had name recognition from his family's beer business, he was quickly criticized for serving 18 months in the administration of Wisconsin Governor Jim Doyle, a Democrat. After being told by SABMiller that if he were to continue his bid for U.S. Senate he would lose his tenure with the company he withdrew from the race in May 2010, and endorsed the eventual winner of the election, Republican Ron Johnson.
