= Wisconsin's 4th Assembly district =

American legislative district in northeast Wisconsin

Wisconsin's 4th State Assembly district
- 2024 map defined in 2023 Wisc. Act 94; 2022 map defined in Johnson v. Wisconsin Elections Commission; 2011 map was defined in 2011 Wisc. Act 43
Assemblymember
David Steffen; R–Howard
since January 6, 2015 (11 years, 287 days)
- Demographics: 92.23% White; 0.96% Black; 1.98% Hispanic; 1.32% Asian; 2.85% Native American; 0.04% Hawaiian/Pacific Islander
- Population (2020) • Voting age: 60,096; 46,280
- Website: Official website
- Notes: Northeast Wisconsin

The 4th Assembly district of Wisconsin is one of 99 districts in the Wisconsin State Assembly. Located in northeast Wisconsin, the district comprises part of northwest Brown County, and much of southern Oconto County, including the cities of Oconto and Oconto Falls, and the villages of Howard and Lena, and part of the city of Green Bay. The district is represented by Republican David Steffen, since January 2015.

The 4th Assembly district is located within Wisconsin's 2nd Senate district, along with the 5th and 6th Assembly districts.

== History ==
The district was created in the 1972 redistricting act (1971 Wisc. Act 304) which first established the numbered district system, replacing the previous system which allocated districts to specific counties. The 4th district was drawn from some of the more densely populated parts of the previous Brown County 2nd district, including the town of De Pere, the city of De Pere, the villages of Bellevue and Allouez, and part of southern Green Bay.

The 1982 court-ordered redistricting plan, which scrambled all State Assembly districts, moved the 4th district to Milwaukee County. The 1983 redistricting, passed by the Legislature, superseded the court-ordered plan and moved the 4th district back to northeast Wisconsin, but it now spanned a vast—mostly rural—stretch of Oconto, Shawano, and Outagamie counties. That map remained until the 1992 redistricting, which moved the 4th district back into suburban Brown County, where it has remained through subsequent redistrictings, with some variation in the boundaries and municipalities included. The 2024 redistricting act moved the district further out from Green Bay, removing Ashwaubenon and Allouez, and instead adding Suamico and southern Oconto County.

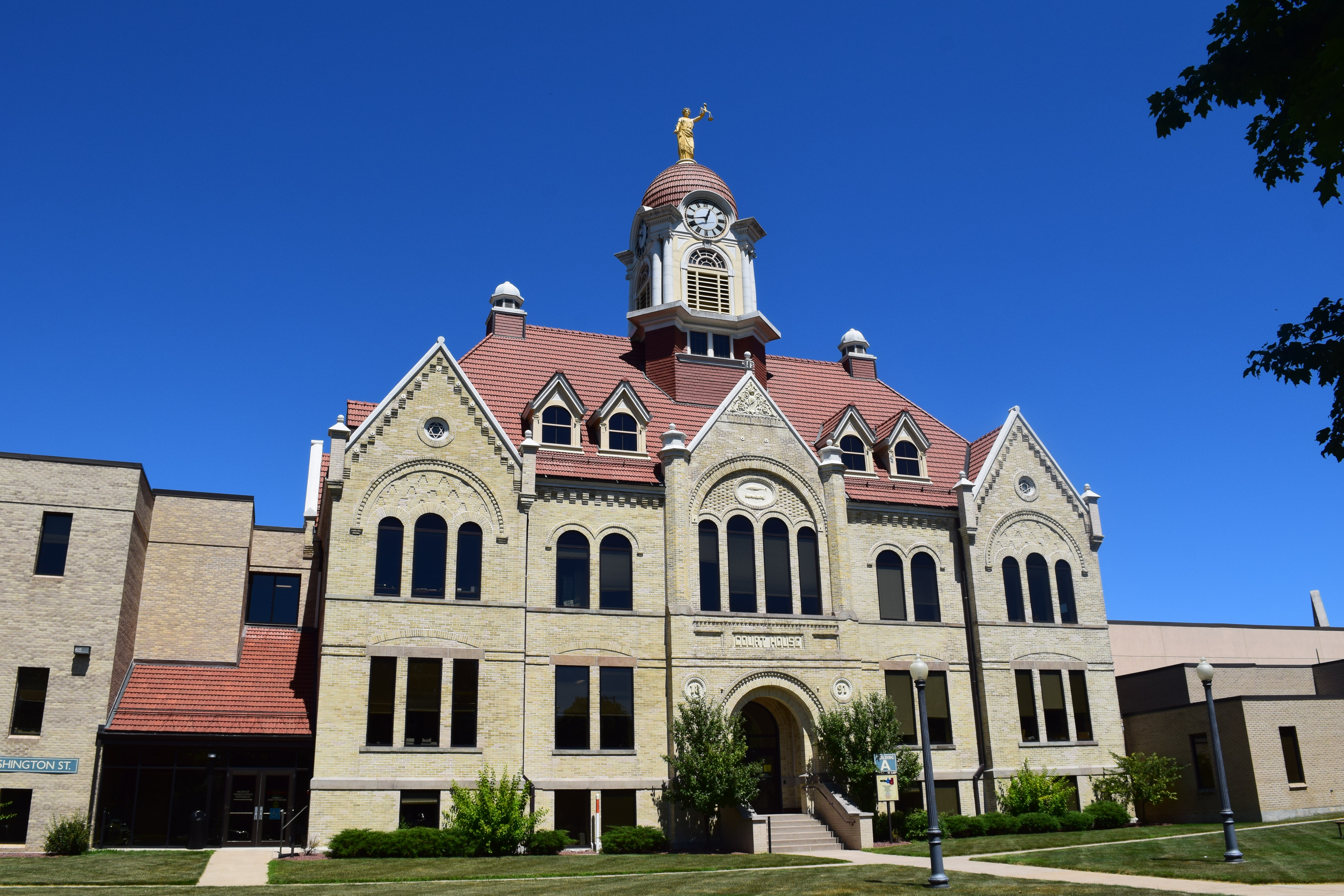
Oconto County courthouse in Oconto

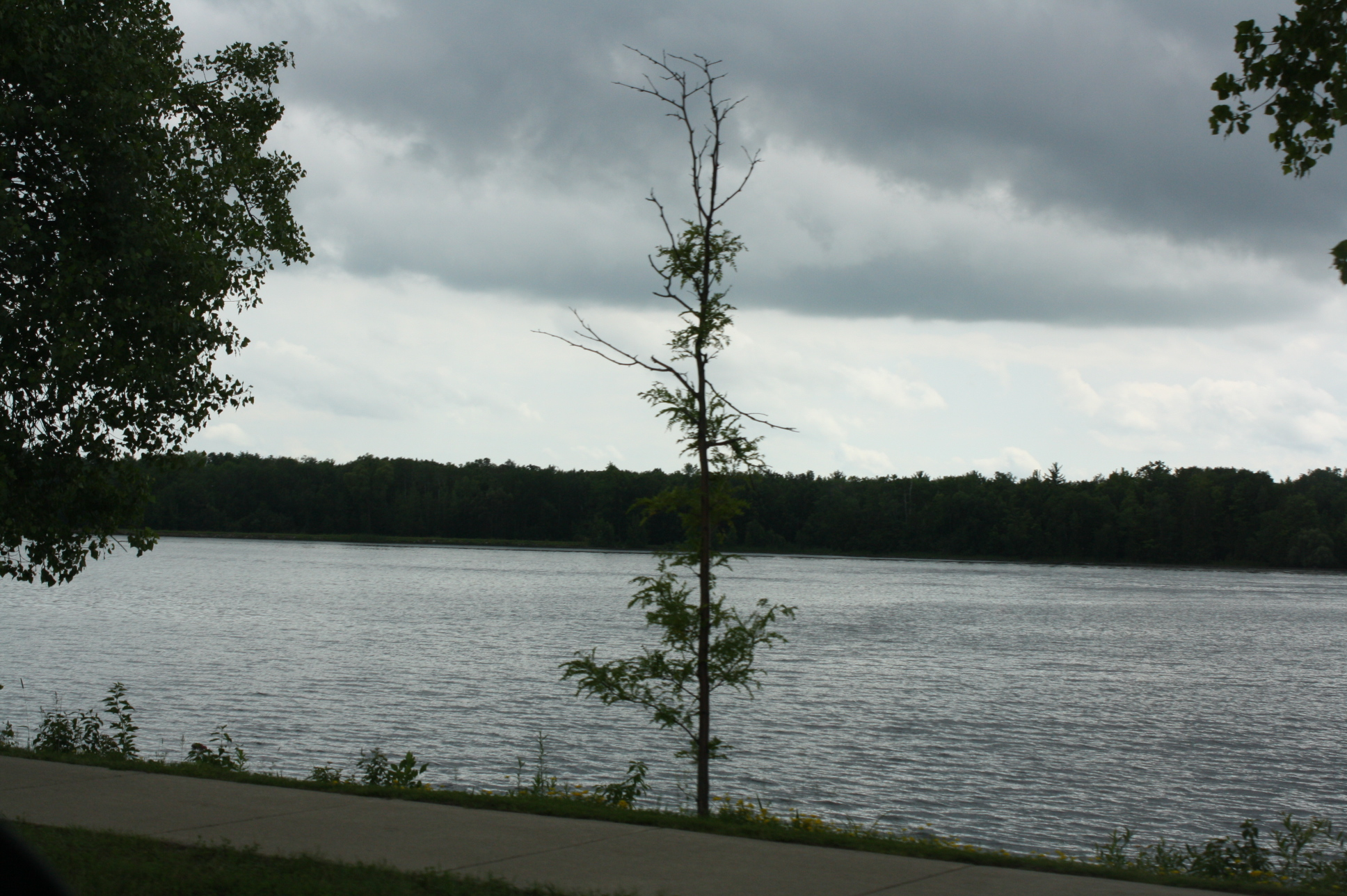
Oconto River in Oconto Falls

== List of past representatives ==
List of representatives to the Wisconsin State Assembly from the 4th district
Member	Party	Residence	Counties represented	Term start	Term end	Ref.
District created
John C. Gower	Rep.	Green Bay	Brown	January 1, 1973	January 1, 1979	
Gary T. Dilweg	Rep.	De Pere	Brown	January 1, 1979	January 3, 1983	
Barbara Ulichny	Dem.	Milwaukee	Milwaukee	January 3, 1983	January 7, 1985	
Cathy Zeuske	Rep.	Shawano	Oconto, Outagamie, Shawano	January 7, 1985	January 7, 1991	
John Ainsworth	Rep.	Waukechon	Oconto, Outagamie, Shawano	January 7, 1991	January 4, 1993	
Mark A. Green	Rep.	Green Bay	Brown	January 4, 1993	January 4, 1999	
Phil Montgomery	Rep.	Ashwaubenon	Brown	January 4, 1999	January 3, 2011	
Chad Weininger	Rep.	Green Bay	Brown	January 3, 2011	January 6, 2015	
David Steffen	Rep.	Howard	Brown	January 6, 2015	January 6, 2025	
David Steffen	Rep.	Howard	Brown, Oconto	January 6, 2025	Current	
