= Wisconsin Economic Development Corporation =

Wisconsin state executive department

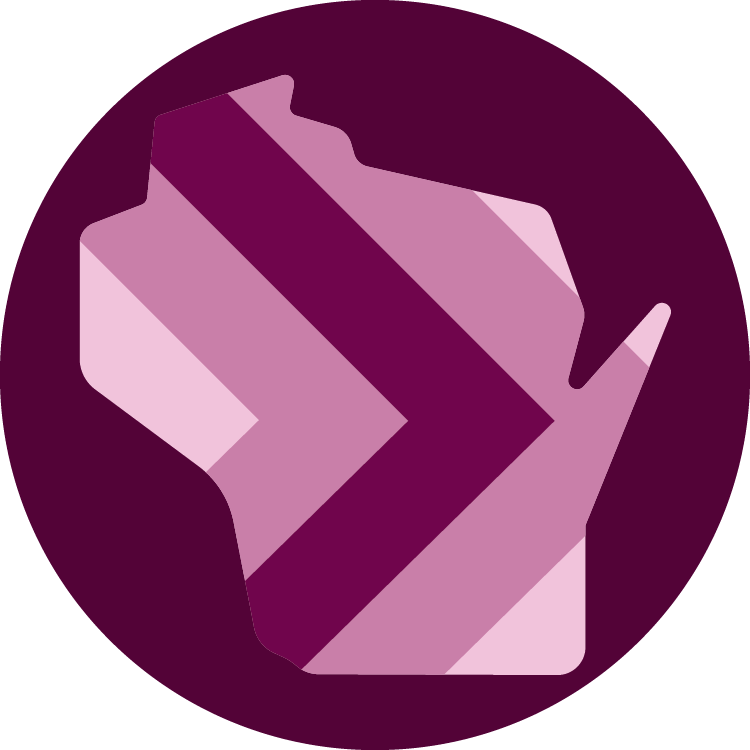

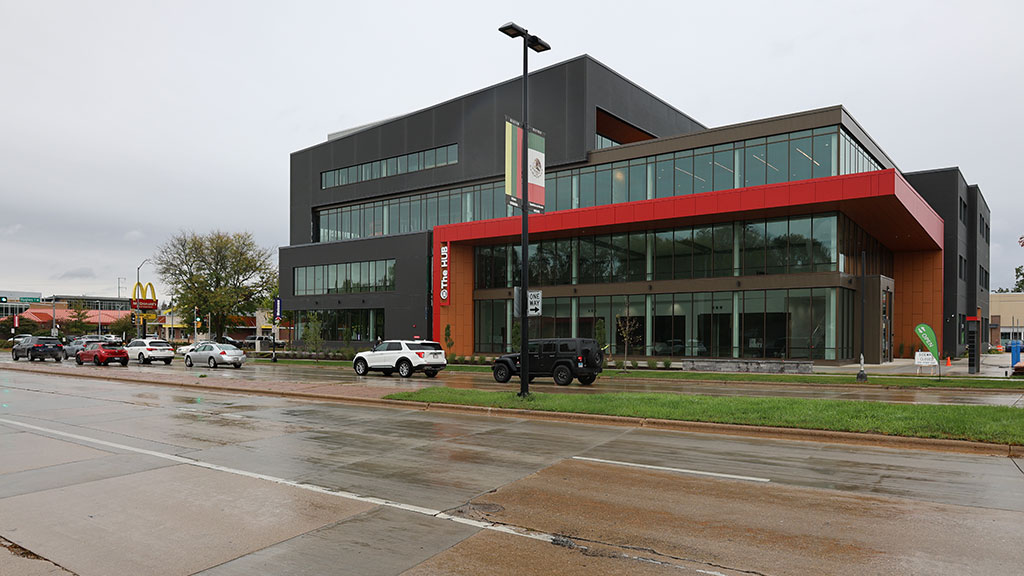
- WEDC @ The HUB

Agency overview
- Formed: July 1, 2011; 15 years ago
- Preceding agencies: Wisconsin Department of Local Affairs and Development (1967–1979); Wisconsin Department of Business Development (1971–1979); Wisconsin Department of Commerce (1979–2011)
- Jurisdiction: Wisconsin
- Headquarters: WEDC @ The HUB 2352 S. Park St., Suite 303, Madison, WI 53713
- Employees: 110
- Annual budget: $83,101,400 (FY2023)
- Agency executives: Henry C. Newell, Board chair; John W. Miller, Secretary and Chief Executive Officer
- Website: WEDC.org

The Wisconsin Economic Development Corporation (WEDC) is a public-private agency in the state of Wisconsin designed to assist business development and innovation through loans, grants, tax credits, and technical assistance programs.

== History ==
WEDC was established in 2011 during the tenure of Gov. Scott Walker to replace the Wisconsin Department of Commerce. The impetus for WEDC resulted from a 2010 report titled “Be Bold Wisconsin: The Wisconsin Competitiveness Study” that recommended a non-political authority be created to design and deliver a statewide economic development strategy.

== Structure ==
=== Leadership and governance ===
The WEDC is governed by an 18-member board of directors. The governor of Wisconsin appoints six members of the board, with the advice and consent of the Wisconsin Senate. The speaker of the Wisconsin State Assembly may appoint four members, the Senate majority may appoint four members, and the minority leaders of the two legislative chambers may each appoint one member. The secretaries of the Wisconsin Department of Administration and the Wisconsin Department of Revenue also both serve as non-voting members of the board. When the corporation was first established, the governor was ex officio chairman of the board; since 2015, the chair has been elected by the board from among its members. The current board chair is Henry C. Newell, retired CEO of Wausau Paper.

The corporation is administered by a secretary and chief executive officer, appointed by the governor with the advice and consent of the Senate. The current CEO, John W. Miller, was appointed by Governor Tony Evers in December 2025.

=== Funding ===
WEDC receives revenue from several sources, including State General Purpose Revenues (from state legislative appropriation); the State Economic Development Fund (from 3% tax on corporations); Brownfield Site Assessment (collected through the state's environmental fund); intergovernmental revenues (e.g. federal grants); interest on loans; charges for services (loan origination fees, bond servicing fees, tax transfer fees, sponsorship contribution); interest on investments; and other revenues (receipts which do not fall into one of the other categories).

=== Offices ===
WEDC has several divisions and offices, including the Global Trade and Investment division, which works with businesses to identify partners and navigate export processes; the Business and Community Development division, which works with local officials through financial assistance to revitalize commercial districts; the Entrepreneurship and Innovation division, which provides support to start-ups using tax incentives; and the Office of Rural Prosperity, which aims to assist farmers and rural residents.

== Financial and technical assistance programs ==
=== Overview ===
WEDC provides assistance to businesses, communities, and individuals through grants, loans, and tax credits, including:

- Community Development Investment Grants provide incentives to redevelopment projects that add jobs, primarily in downtown business districts.
- Technology Development Loans provide financial assistance to startups and growth companies to build workforce skills.
- Business Development Tax Credits provide incentives to businesses that expand in or relocate to the state.
- Enterprise Zones provide tax incentives to companies who expand in or relocate to targeted economic areas.
- Qualified New Business Venture credits provide early-stage businesses with tax credits of up to 25 percent of equity investment.

Other programs include grants for brownfield redevelopment, fabrication laboratories, workforce training, and businesses owned by minorities, women and veterans.

=== Pandemic ===
In 2020, WEDC provided nearly $240 million in direct assistance to more than 55,000 small businesses impacted by the COVID-19 pandemic, funded through the federal CARES Act. WEDC also reallocated $5 million in internal resources to Community Development Financial Institutions for grants to existing loan customers to help with short-term cash flow and to protect jobs and public health during the COVID-19 outbreak.

=== Wisconn Valley Science and Technology Park ===
In 2017, WEDC entered into a contract with Foxconn, Hon Hai Precision Manufacturing, and SIO International (collectively known as Foxconn) to provide up to $2.85 billion in tax credits over a period of 15 years if the company built a $10 billion Generation 10.5 liquid crystal display panel plant and employed 13,000 workers in Mount Pleasant, Wisconsin. In 2020, WEDC notified the company it was ineligible to receive the credits because the facility specified under the contract had not been built. In April 2021, WEDC and Foxconn approved a revised agreement under which Foxconn will be eligible to receive up to $80 million in performance-based tax credits if the company invests to $672 million and creates 1,454 jobs in Wisconsin by 2026. The new contract does not specify what Foxconn will build at the site.

== Awards ==
WEDC has been nationally recognized for its transparency in reporting economic development awards. The organization provides a searchable online database and map of its awards.

== Past executives ==
The Wisconsin Department of Economic Development has had five CEOs since its creation in 2011.

Order	Name	Took office	Left office	Governor
1	Paul Jadin	2011	2012	Scott Walker
2	Reed Hall	2012	2015	Scott Walker
3	Mark R. Hogan	2015	2019	Scott Walker
4	Melissa Hughes	2019	2025	Tony Evers
5	John W. Miller	2025	Present	Tony Evers

== See also ==
- Wisconsin Department of Commerce
