= Sam Halloin =

American politician (1923–2013)

Mayor of Green Bay, Wisconsin
- In office 1979–1995
- Preceded by: Michael Monfils
- Succeeded by: Paul Jadin

Personal details
- Born: March 20, 1923 Lincoln, Kewaunee County, Wisconsin
- Died: January 11, 2013 (aged 89)
- Spouse: Isabelle Mastriocola (1949–2010)

Samuel J. Halloin (March 20, 1923 – January 11, 2013) was an American politician who served as the mayor of Green Bay, Wisconsin from 1979 to 1995. Halloin, who served for four consecutive terms, is the second longest-serving Mayor of Green Bay in history.

== Biography ==
Halloin was born on March 20, 1923, to Louis Joseph and Laura Halloin in Lincoln, Wisconsin. Halloin attended, but never finished college, which he described as his one major regret.

Halloin served in the United States Army during World War II. He was a participant in the D-Day invasion of Normandy and the liberation of the Dachau concentration camp. He married Isabelle Mastriocola on June 18, 1949.

He was elected to the Green Bay City Council for the first time in 1962. He served for eight terms as an alderman and supervisor representing Green Bay's west side.

Halloin served as the city's mayor for sixteen years from 1979 to 1995. During his tenure, Halloin obtained funding for the construction of a new Walnut Street Bridge, which crosses the Fox River. Halloin helped to upgrade Lambeau Field, the home stadium of the Green Bay Packers, and acquired land for the present-day riverwalk along the Fox River.

He declined to seek re-election in 1995 and retired from office after four-consecutive, four-year terms. He was succeeded by Paul Jadin.

Sam Halloin died on January 11, 2013, at the age of 89. His wife, Isabelle, died in 2010.

Political offices
Preceded by Michael Monfils	Mayor of Green Bay, Wisconsin; 1979 - 1995	Succeeded by Paul Jadin
