= Wisconsin Department of Commerce =

Defunct state government agency

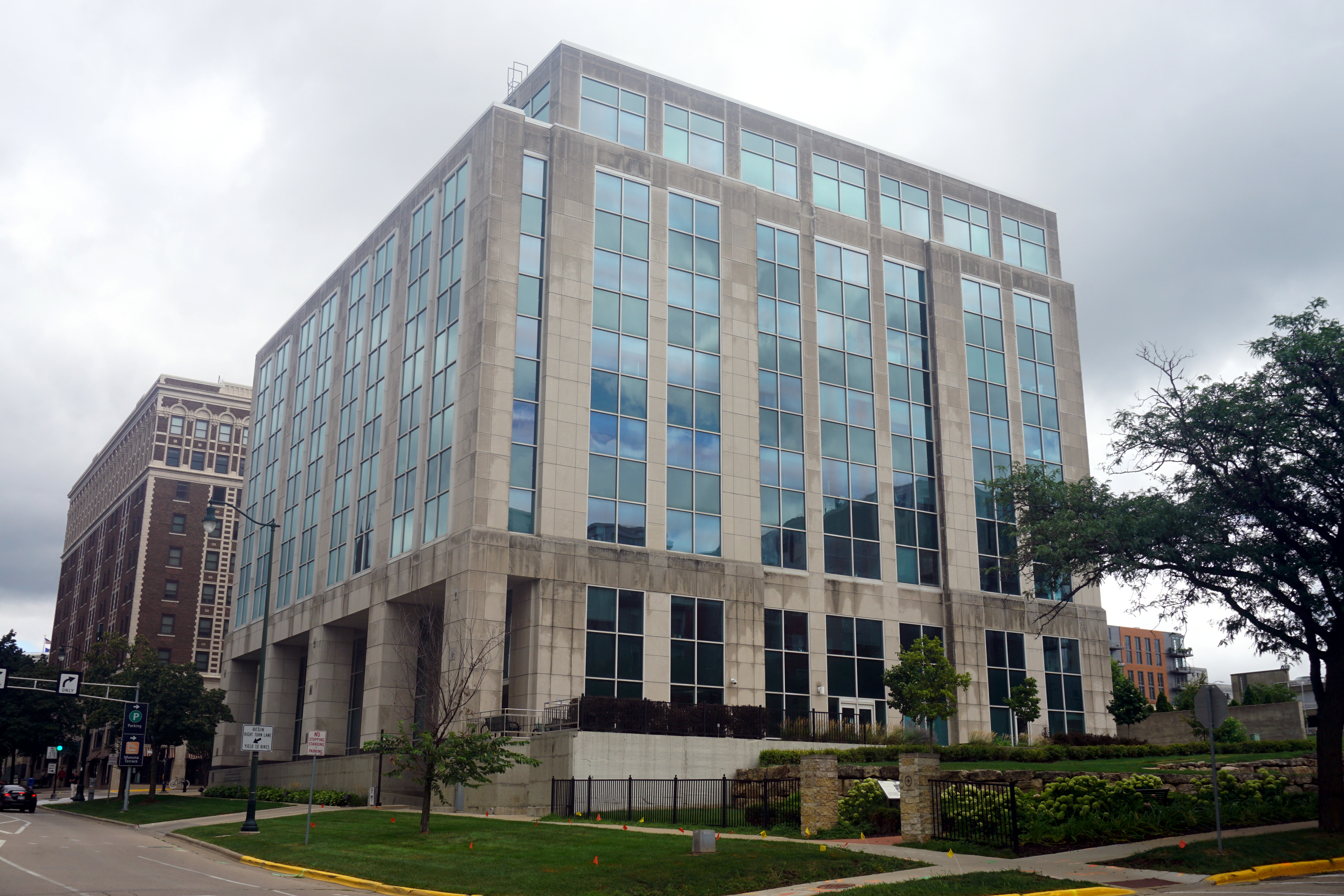
- Tommy G. Thompson Center

Agency overview
- Formed: 1979
- Preceding agencies: Wisconsin Department of Local Affairs and Development (1967–1979); Wisconsin Department of Business Development (1971–1979)
- Dissolved: 2011
- Superseding agencies: Wisconsin Economic Development Corporation; Wisconsin Department of Safety and Professional Services
- Jurisdiction: Wisconsin
- Headquarters: Tommy G. Thompson Center; 201 W. Washington Ave., Madison, Wisconsin 53707
- Employees: 394.7 (2007–2009)
- Annual budget: $387,061,200 (2007–2009)
- Agency executive: Secretary
- Website: http://commerce.wi.gov

The Wisconsin Department of Commerce was a department in the executive branch of the Government of Wisconsin. It was abolished in 2011 and succeeded by the Wisconsin Economic Development Corporation.

The Wisconsin Department of Commerce was originally established as the Wisconsin Department of Development in 1979, and renamed to the Department of Commerce in 1995. The department was responsible for implementing and overseeing the economic development programs for Wisconsin through consultation, technical assistance, and relocation assistance. It also administered the distribution of federal economic assistance programs to local governments and businesses, and acts as a go-between for businesses and other government agencies. The department also enforced laws regarding safety and sanitation in buildings, petroleum products, and petroleum tanks. It also gave housing assistance to low income families.

The Department of Commerce was administered by a department secretary, who was appointed by the governor with the advice and consent of the Wisconsin Senate.

== History ==
The Department of Commerce traced its roots to the Division of Industrial Development which was originated within the Office of the Governor, as established by the Wisconsin Legislature in 1955. It was renamed the Division of Economic Development in 1959, and was assigned at that time to the Wisconsin Department of Resource Development. In 1965, the division was returned to the Office of the Governor. Two years later, in the executive branch reorganization of 1967, it became part of the Department of Local Affairs and Development, where it absorbed local and regional planning functions.

In 1971, the division was promoted to a department, when the Legislature created the Department of Business Development. The department then absorbed the division of tourism from the Department of Natural Resources in 1975. In 1979, the Department of Business Development was combined with the Department of Local Affairs and Development to form the Department of Development, which was renamed the Department of Commerce in 1995.

In 2011, the Wisconsin Legislature voted to abolish the Department of Commerce. Its core economic development functions were transferred to the new Wisconsin Economic Development Corporation. Other functions, such as those promoting building safety and certain professional licensing, were transferred to a new Wisconsin Department of Safety and Professional Services.

The Department of Commerce ceased operations on July 1, 2011.

== Past Commerce Divisions ==
The following units are part of the Department of Commerce and report to the Secretary of Commerce:

- Division of Administrative Services
  - Bureau of Fiscal Services and Procurement
  - Bureau of Human Resources, Facilities and Safety
  - Bureau of Information Technology
  - Bureau of Policy and Budget Development
- Division of Business Development
  - Bureau of Business Development
  - Bureau of Business Finance and Compliance
  - Bureau of Entrepreneurship and Technology
  - Bureau of Minority Business Development
- Division of Environmental and Regulatory Services
  - Bureau of Petroleum
    - Environmental Cleanup Fund Administration
  - Bureau of Petroleum Products and Tanks
- Division of Global Ventures
  - Bureau of Export Development
- Division of Housing and Community Development
  - Bureau of Community Finance
  - Bureau of Planning and Technical Assistance
  - Bureau of Supportive Housing
- Division of Safety and Buildings
  - Bureau of Integrated Services
  - Bureau of Program Development
