= 104th Wisconsin Legislature =

Wisconsin legislative term for 2019–2020

←	103rd	105th	→
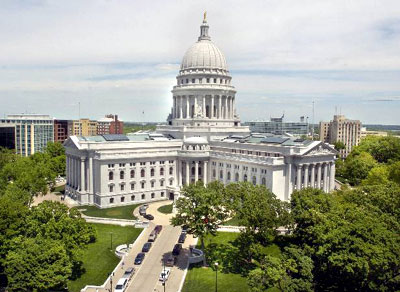
- Wisconsin State Capitol

Overview
- Legislative body: Wisconsin Legislature
- Meeting place: Wisconsin State Capitol
- Term: January 7, 2019 – January 4, 2021
- Election: November 6, 2018

Senate
- Members: 33
- Senate President: Roger Roth (R)
- President pro tempore: Howard Marklein (R)
- Party control: Republican

Assembly
- Members: 99
- Assembly Speaker: Robin Vos (R)
- Speaker pro tempore: Tyler August (R)
- Party control: Republican

Sessions
- Regular: January 7, 2019 – January 4, 2021

Special sessions
- Feb. 2019 Extra.: February 28, 2019 – February 28, 2019
- Nov. 2019 Spec.: November 7, 2019 – November 7, 2019
- Jan. 2020 Spec.: January 28, 2020 – April 16, 2020
- Feb. 2020 Spec.: February 11, 2020 – February 25, 2020
- Apr. 2020 Spec. 1: April 4, 2020 – April 8, 2020
- Apr. 2020 Spec. 2: April 7, 2020 – April 8, 2020
- Apr. 2020 Extra.: April 14, 2020 – April 16, 2020
- Aug. 2020 Spec.: August 31, 2020 – December 22, 2020

The One Hundred Fourth Wisconsin Legislature convened from January 7, 2019, to January 4, 2021, in regular session, though it adjourned for legislative activity on May 13, 2020. The Legislature also held two extraordinary sessions and six special sessions during the legislative term.

The second year of this legislature was significantly impacted by the arrival of the COVID-19 pandemic in Wisconsin.

Senators representing odd-numbered districts were newly elected for this session and were serving the first two years of a four-year term. Assembly members were elected to a two-year term. Assembly members and odd-numbered senators were elected in the general election of November 6, 2018. Senators representing even-numbered districts were serving the third and fourth year of their four-year term, having been elected in the general election held on November 8, 2016.

The governor of Wisconsin during this entire term was Democrat Tony Evers, of Dane County, serving the first two years of a four-year term, having won election in the 2018 Wisconsin gubernatorial election.

== Major events ==
- January 7, 2019: Inauguration of Tony Evers as the 46th Governor of Wisconsin.
- January 25, 2019: The U.S. federal government shutdown over funding for President Donald Trump's planned Mexico–United States border wall expansion ended after 35 days without approving new funding for the wall.
- March 23, 2019: The final territory held by the Islamic State of Iraq and the Levant was liberated by Syrian Democratic Forces.
- April 2, 2019: 2019 Wisconsin Spring election:
  - Brian Hagedorn was elected to the Wisconsin Supreme Court to succeed Shirley Abrahamson.
- October 21, 2019: Governor Tony Evers called a special session of the Legislature to consider gun control legislation.
- October 27, 2019: Abu Bakr al-Baghdadi, the leader of the Islamic State of Iraq and the Levant, killed himself during a raid by U.S. Special Forces near Barisha, Syria.
- December 1, 2019: First known human case of COVID-19, in Wuhan, Hubei, China.
- December 18, 2019: The United States House of Representatives voted to impeach U.S. President Donald Trump for abuse of power and obstruction of Congress.
- January 3, 2020: Iranian General Qasem Soleimani was assassinated by a U.S. drone strike, near Baghdad International Airport in Iraq.
- January 22, 2020: Governor Tony Evers called a special session of the Legislature.
- February 5, 2020: First case of COVID-19 detected in Wisconsin.
- February 5, 2020: United States Senate voted to acquit U.S. President Donald Trump on charges of abuse of power and obstruction of Congress.
- February 6, 2020: Governor Tony Evers called a special session of the Legislature to consider education funding legislation.
- March 19, 2020: First death from COVID-19 in Wisconsin. (155 cases in Wisconsin, 175 deaths in the United States)
- April 3, 2020: Governor Tony Evers called a special session of the Legislature to consider legislation to push back the spring election and make other election process changes to accommodate safe voting in the COVID-19 pandemic.
- April 6, 2020: Governor Tony Evers called a special session of the Legislature to consider legislation to set a new date for the spring election.
- April 7, 2020: 2020 Wisconsin Spring election:
  - Jill Karofsky was elected to the Wisconsin Supreme Court, defeating incumbent Daniel Kelly.
  - Wisconsin voters ratified an amendment to the state constitution, establishing additional rights for crime victims (Marsy's Law).
- August 11, 2020: 1,000th death from COVID-19 in Wisconsin. (61,785 cases in Wisconsin, 152,795 deaths in the United States)
- August 23, 2020: Jacob Blake, a black man carrying a knife, was shot four times in the back and three times in the side by a police officer in Kenosha, Wisconsin, provoking several days of protests and unrest.
- August 24, 2020: Governor Tony Evers called a special session of the Legislature to consider legislation on police reform.
- August 25, 2020: Kyle Rittenhouse, a 17-year-old counter-protester, shot and killed two protesters in Kenosha, Wisconsin.
- September 18, 2020: Caleb Frostman, the Secretary of the Wisconsin Department of Workforce Development, was fired by Governor Tony Evers due to unemployment claim backlogs.
- September 18, 2020: Ruth Bader Ginsburg, Associate Justice of the Supreme Court of the United States, died in Washington, D.C.
- October 2, 2020: U.S. President Donald Trump tested positive for COVID-19 and was admitted to Walter Reed National Military Medical Center.
- October 26, 2020: Amy Coney Barrett was confirmed as Associate Justice of the Supreme Court of the United States.
- November 3, 2020: 2020 United States general election:
  - Joe Biden (D) elected President of the United States.
- December 11, 2020: The U.S. Food and Drug Administration issued its first approval for emergency use authorization for a COVID-19 vaccine (Pfizer–BioNTech)
- December 12, 2020: 4,000th death from COVID-19 in Wisconsin. (434,016 cases in Wisconsin, 281,590 deaths in the United States)
- December 19, 2020: Shirley Abrahamson, the 25th chief justice of the Wisconsin Supreme Court, died in Berkeley, California.

== Major legislation ==
- March 6, 2020: Act to create 753.0605 of the statutes; relating to: adding 12 circuit court branches to be allocated by the director of state courts. 2019 Wisc. Act 184
- April 15, 2020: Act ... relating to: state government response to the COVID-19 pandemic. 2019 Wisc. Act 185

== Party summary ==
=== Senate summary ===
Senate Partisan composition Democratic: 14 seats Republican: 19 seats

	Party (Shading indicates majority caucus)		Total	
	Democratic	Republican	Total	Vacant
End of previous Legislature	15	18	33	0
Start of Reg. Session	14	19	33	0
from May 15, 2020 (Note: Democrat Jennifer Shilling (32nd district) resigned.)	13	19	32	1
from May 18, 2020 (Note: Republican Tom Tiffany (12th district) resigned due to his election to the United States House of Representatives.)	13	18	31	2
Final voting share	41.94%	58.06%		
Beginning of the next Legislature	12	20	32	1

=== Assembly summary ===
Assembly Partisan composition Democratic: 36 seats Republican: 63 seats

	Party (Shading indicates majority caucus)		Total	
	Democratic	Republican	Total	Vacant
End of previous Legislature	35	64	99	0
Start of Reg. Session	36	63	99	0
From Jan. 8, 2019 (Note: Democrat Peter W. Barca (Assembly District 64) resigned after he was appointed Secretary of the Wisconsin Department of Revenue.)	35	63	98	1
From May 13, 2019 (Note: Democrat Tip McGuire replaced Peter W. Barca (Assembly District 64).)	36	63	99	0
From Jun. 18, 2020 (Note: Democrat David Crowley (Assembly District 17) resigned after he was elected Milwaukee County Executive.)	35	63	98	1
From Jul. 31, 2020 (Note: Democrat Chris Taylor (Assembly District 76) resigned after she was appointed Wisconsin circuit court judge in Dane County.)	34	63	97	2
From Dec. 2, 2020 (Note: Republican John Nygren (Assembly District 89) resigned.)	34	62	96	3
Final voting share	35.42%	64.58%		
Beginning of the next Legislature	38	60	98	1

== Sessions ==
- Regular session: January 7, 2019 – January 4, 2021
- February 2019 extraordinary session: February 28, 2019 – February 28, 2019
- November 2019 special session: November 7, 2019 – November 7, 2019
- January 2020 special session: January 28, 2020 – April 16, 2020
- February 2020 special session: February 11, 2020 – February 25, 2020
- April 2020 special session 1: April 4, 2020 – April 8, 2020
- April 2020 special session 2: April 7, 2020 – April 8, 2020
- April 2020 extraordinary session: April 14, 2020 – April 16, 2020
- August 2020 special session: August 31, 2020 – December 22, 2020

== Leadership ==
=== Senate leadership ===
- President of the Senate: Roger Roth (R–Appleton)
- President pro tempore: Howard Marklein (R–Spring Green)

Senate majority leadership (Republican)

- Senate Majority Leader: Scott L. Fitzgerald (R–Juneau)
- Assistant Majority Leader: Dan Feyen (R–Fond du Lac)
- Senate Majority Caucus Chair: Van H. Wanggaard (R–Racine)
- Senate Majority Caucus Vice Chair: Patrick Testin (R–Stevens Point)

Senate minority leadership (Democratic)

- Senate Minority Leader: Jennifer Shilling (D–La Crosse) (until Apr. 24, 2020)
  - Janet Bewley (D) (after Apr. 24, 2020)
- Assistant Minority Leader: Janet Bewley (D–Mason) (until Apr. 24, 2020)
  - Janis Ringhand (D–Evansville) (after Apr. 24, 2020)
- Senate Minority Caucus Chair: Mark F. Miller (D–Monona)
- Senate Minority Caucus Vice Chair: Janis Ringhand (D–Evansville) (until Apr. 24, 2020)

=== Assembly leadership ===
- Speaker of the Assembly: Robin Vos (R–Burlington)
- Speaker pro tempore: Tyler August (R–Lake Geneva)

Assembly majority leadership (Republican)

- Assembly Majority Leader: Jim Steineke (R–Kaukauna)
- Assistant Majority Leader: Mary Felzkowski (R–Tomahawk)
- Assembly Majority Caucus Chair: Dan Knodl (R–Germantown)
- Assembly Majority Caucus Vice Chair: Romaine Quinn (R–Rice Lake)
- Assembly Majority Caucus Secretary: Jessie Rodriguez (R–Oak Creek)
- Assembly Majority Caucus Sergeant-at-Arms: Samantha Kerkman (R–Salem)

Assembly minority leadership (Democratic)

- Assembly Minority Leader: Gordon Hintz (D–Oshkosh)
- Assistant Minority Leader: Dianne Hesselbein (D–Middleton)
- Assembly Minority Caucus Chair: Mark Spreitzer (D–Beloit)
- Assembly Minority Caucus Vice Chair: Steve Doyle (D–Onalaska)
- Assembly Minority Caucus Secretary: Beth Meyers (D–Bayfield)
- Assembly Minority Caucus Sergeant-at-Arms: Christine Sinicki (D–Milwaukee)

== Members ==
=== Members of the Senate ===
Members of the Wisconsin Senate for the One Hundred Fourth Wisconsin Legislature:

Senate partisan representation Democratic: 14 seats Republican: 19 seats

Dist.	Senator	Party	Age (2019)	Home	First elected
01	André Jacque	Rep.	38	De Pere, Brown County	2018
02	Robert Cowles	Rep.	68	Green Bay, Brown County	1987
03	Tim Carpenter	Dem.	58	Milwaukee, Milwaukee County	2002
04	Lena Taylor	Dem.	52	Milwaukee, Milwaukee County	2004
05	Dale Kooyenga	Rep.	39	Brookfield, Waukesha County	2018
06	LaTonya Johnson	Dem.	46	Milwaukee, Milwaukee County	2016
07	Chris Larson	Dem.	38	Milwaukee, Milwaukee County	2010
08	Alberta Darling	Rep.	74	River Hills, Milwaukee County	1992
09	Devin LeMahieu	Rep.	46	Oostburg, Sheboygan County	2014
10	Patty Schachtner	Dem.	58–59	Somerset, St. Croix County	2018
11	Stephen Nass	Rep.	66	La Grange, Walworth County	2014
12	Tom Tiffany (res. May 18, 2020)	Rep.	61	Little Rice, Oneida County	2012
12	--Vacant since May 18, 2020--				
13	Scott L. Fitzgerald	Rep.	55	Juneau, Dodge County	1994
14	Luther Olsen	Rep.	67	Ripon, Fond du Lac County	2004
15	Janis Ringhand	Dem.	68	Evansville, Rock County	2014
16	Mark F. Miller	Dem.	75	Monona, Dane County	2004
17	Howard Marklein	Rep.	64	Spring Green, Sauk County	2014
18	Dan Feyen	Rep.	50–51	Fond du Lac, Fond du Lac County	2016
19	Roger Roth	Rep.	40	Appleton, Outagamie County	2014
20	Duey Stroebel	Rep.	59	Saukville, Ozaukee County	2015
21	Van H. Wanggaard	Rep.	66	Racine, Racine County	2010
22	Robert Wirch	Dem.	75	Somers, Kenosha County	1996
23	Kathy Bernier	Rep.	62	Chippewa Falls, Chippewa County	2018
24	Patrick Testin	Rep.	30	Stevens Point, Portage County	2016
25	Janet Bewley	Dem.	67	Mason, Bayfield County	2014
26	Fred Risser	Dem.	91	Madison, Dane County	1962
27	Jon Erpenbach	Dem.	57	Middleton, Dane County	1998
28	Dave Craig	Rep.	39	Big Bend, Waukesha County	2016
29	Jerry Petrowski	Rep.	68	Marathon, Marathon County	2012
30	Dave Hansen	Dem.	71	Green Bay, Brown County	2000
31	Jeff Smith	Dem.	63	Eau Claire, Eau Claire County	2018
32	Jennifer Shilling (res. May 15, 2020)	Dem.	49	La Crosse, La Crosse County	2011
32	--Vacant from May 15, 2020--				
33	Chris Kapenga	Rep.	46	Delafield, Waukesha County	2015

=== Members of the Assembly ===
Members of the Assembly for the One Hundred Fourth Wisconsin Legislature:

Assembly partisan representation Democratic: 36 seats Republican: 63 seats

Sen. Dist.	Dist.	Representative	Party	Age (2019)	Residence	First Elected
01	01	Joel Kitchens	Rep.	61	Sturgeon Bay	2014
01	02	Shae Sortwell	Rep.	33	Two Rivers	2018
01	03	Ron Tusler	Rep.	34	Appleton	2016
02	04	David Steffen	Rep.	46	Howard	2014
02	05	Jim Steineke	Rep.	48	Kaukauna	2010
02	06	Gary Tauchen	Rep.	65	Bonduel	2006
03	07	Daniel Riemer	Dem.	32	Milwaukee	2012
03	08	JoCasta Zamarripa	Dem.	42	Milwaukee	2010
03	09	Marisabel Cabrera	Dem.	43	Milwaukee	2018
04	10	David Bowen	Dem.	31	Milwaukee	2014
04	11	Jason Fields	Dem.	44	Milwaukee	2004
04	12	LaKeshia Myers	Dem.	34	Milwaukee	2018
05	13	Rob Hutton	Rep.	51	Brookfield	2012
05	14	Robyn Vining	Dem.	42	Wauwatosa	2018
05	15	Joe Sanfelippo	Rep.	54	New Berlin	2012
06	16	Kalan Haywood	Dem.	19	Milwaukee	2018
06	17	David Crowley (res. Jun. 18, 2020)	Dem.	32	Milwaukee	2016
06	17	--Vacant from Jun. 18, 2020--				
06	18	Evan Goyke	Dem.	36	Milwaukee	2012
07	19	Jonathan Brostoff	Dem.	35	Milwaukee	2014
07	20	Christine Sinicki	Dem.	58	Bay View	1998
07	21	Jessie Rodriguez	Rep.	41	Oak Creek	2013
08	22	Janel Brandtjen	Rep.	52	Waukesha	2014
08	23	Jim Ott	Rep.	71	Mequon	2006
08	24	Dan Knodl	Rep.	60	Germantown	2008
09	25	Paul Tittl	Rep.	57	Manitowoc	2012
09	26	Terry Katsma	Rep.	60	Oostburg	2014
09	27	Tyler Vorpagel	Rep.	33	Plymouth	2014
10	28	Gae Magnafici	Rep.	66	Dresser	2018
10	29	Rob Stafsholt	Rep.	43	New Richmond	2016
10	30	Shannon Zimmerman	Rep.	46	River Falls	2016
11	31	Amy Loudenbeck	Rep.	49	Clinton	2010
11	32	Tyler August	Rep.	35	Walworth	2010
11	33	Cody Horlacher	Rep.	31	Mukwonago	2014
12	34	Rob Swearingen	Rep.	55	Rhinelander	2012
12	35	Mary Felzkowski	Rep.	55	Tomahawk	2012
12	36	Jeffrey Mursau	Rep.	64	Crivitz	2004
13	37	John Jagler	Rep.	49	Watertown	2012
13	38	Barbara Dittrich	Rep.	54	Oconomowoc	2018
13	39	Mark Born	Rep.	42	Beaver Dam	2012
14	40	Kevin David Petersen	Rep.	54	Waupaca	2006
14	41	Joan Ballweg	Rep.	66	Markesan	2004
14	42	Jon Plumer	Rep.	63	Lodi	2018
15	43	Don Vruwink	Dem.	66	Milton	2016
15	44	Debra Kolste	Dem.	65	Janesville	2012
15	45	Mark Spreitzer	Dem.	32	Beloit	2014
16	46	Gary Hebl	Dem.	67	Sun Prairie	2004
16	47	Jimmy P. Anderson	Dem.	32	Fitchburg	2016
16	48	Melissa Agard Sargent	Dem.	49	Madison	2012
17	49	Travis Tranel	Rep.	33	Cuba City	2010
17	50	Tony Kurtz	Rep.	52	Wonewoc	2018
17	51	Todd Novak	Rep.	53	Dodgeville	2014
18	52	Jeremy Thiesfeldt	Rep.	52	Fond du Lac	2010
18	53	Michael Schraa	Rep.	57	Oshkosh	2012
18	54	Gordon Hintz	Dem.	45	Oshkosh	2006
19	55	Mike Rohrkaste	Rep.	60	Neenah	2014
19	56	Dave Murphy	Rep.	64	Greenville	2012
19	57	Amanda Stuck	Dem.	36	Appleton	2014
20	58	Rick Gundrum	Rep.	53	Slinger	2018
20	59	Timothy Ramthun	Rep.	61	Campbellsport	2018
20	60	Robert Brooks	Rep.	53	Saukville	2011
21	61	Samantha Kerkman	Rep.	44	Powers Lake	2000
21	62	Robert Wittke	Rep.	61	Racine	2018
21	63	Robin Vos	Rep.	50	Rochester	2004
22	64	Peter W. Barca (res. Jan. 8, 2019)	Dem.	61	Kenosha	1984
22	64	Tip McGuire (from May 13, 2019)	Dem.	31	Somers	2019
22	65	Tod Ohnstad	Dem.	66	Kenosha	2012
22	66	Greta Neubauer	Dem.	27	Racine	2018
23	67	Rob Summerfield	Rep.	38	Bloomer	2016
23	68	Jesse James	Rep.	46	Altoona	2018
23	69	Bob Kulp	Rep.	52	Stratford	2013
24	70	Nancy VanderMeer	Rep.	60	Tomah	2014
24	71	Katrina Shankland	Dem.	31	Stevens Point	2012
24	72	Scott Krug	Rep.	43	Wisconsin Rapids	2010
25	73	Nick Milroy	Dem.	44	Superior	2008
25	74	Beth Meyers	Dem.	59	Bayfield	2014
25	75	Romaine Quinn	Rep.	28	Cameron	2014
26	76	Chris Taylor (res. Jul. 31, 2020)	Dem.	50	Madison	2011
26	76	--Vacant from Jul. 31, 2020--				
26	77	Shelia Stubbs	Dem.	47	Madison	2018
26	78	Lisa Subeck	Dem.	47	Madison	2014
27	79	Dianne Hesselbein	Dem.	47	Middleton	2012
27	80	Sondy Pope-Roberts	Dem.	68	Mount Horeb	2002
27	81	Dave Considine	Dem.	66	Baraboo	2014
28	82	Ken Skowronski	Rep.	80	Franklin	2013
28	83	Chuck Wichgers	Rep.	53	Muskego	2016
28	84	Mike Kuglitsch	Rep.	58	New Berlin	2010
29	85	Patrick Snyder	Rep.	62	Schofield	2016
29	86	John Spiros	Rep.	57	Marshfield	2012
29	87	James W. Edming	Rep.	73	Glen Flora	2014
30	88	John Macco	Rep.	60	De Pere	2014
30	89	John Nygren (res. Dec. 2, 2020)	Rep.	54	Marinette	2006
30	89	--Vacant from Dec. 2, 2020--				
30	90	Staush Gruszynski	Dem.	33	Green Bay	2018
31	91	Jodi Emerson	Dem.	45	Eau Claire	2018
31	92	Treig Pronschinske	Rep.	51	Mondovi	2016
31	93	Warren Petryk	Rep.	63	Eleva	2010
32	94	Steve Doyle	Dem.	60	Onalaska	2011
32	95	Jill Billings	Dem.	56	La Crosse	2011
32	96	Loren Oldenburg	Rep.	53	Viroqua	2018
33	97	Scott Allen	Rep.	53	Waukesha	2014
33	98	Adam Neylon	Rep.	34	Pewaukee	2013
33	99	Cindi Duchow	Rep.	60	Delafield	2015

== Committees ==
Legislative committees and leadership for the 104th Legislature.

=== Joint committees ===
- Joint Legislative Audit Committee (Assembly Co-chair: Samantha Kerkman; Senate Co-chair: Robert Cowles)
- Joint Legislative Council (Assembly Co-chair: Robert Brooks; Senate Co-chair: Roger Roth)
- Joint Committee for Review of Administrative Rules (Assembly Co-chair: Joan Ballweg; Senate Co-chair: Stephen Nass)
- Joint Committee on Employment Relations (Assembly Co-chair: Robin Vos; Senate Co-chair: Roger Roth)
- Joint Committee on Finance (Assembly Co-chair: John Nygren; Senate Co-chair: Alberta Darling)
- Joint Committee on Information Policy and Technology (Assembly Co-chair: Dan Knodl; Senate Co-chair: André Jacque)
- Joint Committee on Legislative Organization (Assembly Co-chair: Robin Vos; Senate Co-chair: Roger Roth)
- Joint Review Committee on Criminal Penalties (Assembly Co-chair: Rob Hutton; Senate Co-chair: Van H. Wanggaard)
- Joint Survey Committee on Retirement Systems (Assembly Co-chair: Kathy Bernier; Senate Co-chair: Mary Felzkowski)
- Joint Survey Committee on Tax Exemptions (Assembly Co-chair: Tyler August; Senate Co-chair: Dale P. Kooyenga)
- Speaker's Task Force on Water Quality (Chair: Todd Novak)

=== Senate committees ===
- Senate Committee on Administrative Rules (Chair: Stephen Nass)
- Senate Committee on Agriculture, Revenue and Financial Institutions (Chair: Howard Marklein)
- Senate Committee on Economic Development, Commerce and Trade (Chair: Dan Feyen)
- Senate Committee on Education (Chair: Luther Olsen)
- Senate Committee on Elections, Ethics and Rural Issues (Chair: Kathy Bernier)
- Senate Committee on Finance (Chair: Alberta Darling)
- Senate Committee on Government Operations, Technology and Consumer Protection (Chair: Duey Stroebel)
- Senate Committee on Health and Human Services (Chair: Patrick Testin)
- Senate Committee on Insurance, Financial Services, Government Oversight and Courts (Chair: Dave Craig)
- Senate Committee on Judiciary and Public Safety (Chair: Van H. Wanggaard)
- Senate Committee on Labor and Regulatory Reform (Chair: Stephen Nass)
- Senate Committee on Local Government, Small Business, Tourism and Workforce Development (Chair: André Jacque)
- Senate Committee on Natural Resources and Energy (Chair: Robert Cowles)
- Senate Committee on Public Benefits, Licensing and State-Federal Relations (Chair: Chris Kapenga)
- Senate Committee on Senate Organization (Chair: Scott L. Fitzgerald)
- Senate Committee on Sporting Heritage, Mining and Forestry (Chair: Devin LeMahieu)
- Senate Committee on Transportation, Veterans and Military Affairs (Chair: Jerry Petrowski)
- Senate Committee on Universities, Technical Colleges, Children and Families (Chair: Dale P. Kooyenga)
- Senate Committee on Utilities and Housing (Chair: Devin LeMahieu)

=== Assembly committees ===
- Assembly Committee for Review of Administrative Rules
- Assembly Committee on Aging and Long-Term Care
- Assembly Committee on Agriculture
- Assembly Committee on Assembly Organization (Chair: Robin Vos)
- Assembly Committee on Audit
- Assembly Committee on Campaigns and Elections
- Assembly Committee on Children and Families
- Assembly Committee on Colleges and Universities
- Assembly Committee on Community Development
- Assembly Committee on Constitution and Ethics
- Assembly Committee on Consumer Protection
- Assembly Committee on Corrections
- Assembly Committee on Criminal Justice and Public Safety
- Assembly Committee on Education
- Assembly Committee on Employment Relations
- Assembly Committee on Energy and Utilities
- Assembly Committee on Environment
- Assembly Committee on Family Law
- Assembly Committee on Federalism and Interstate Relations
- Assembly Committee on Finance
- Assembly Committee on Financial Institutions
- Assembly Committee on Forestry, Parks and Outdoor Recreation
- Assembly Committee on Government Accountability and Oversight
- Assembly Committee on Health
- Assembly Committee on Housing and Real Estate
- Assembly Committee on Insurance
- Assembly Committee on International Affairs and Commerce
- Assembly Committee on Jobs and the Economy
- Assembly Committee on Judiciary
- Assembly Committee on Labor and Integrated Employment
- Assembly Committee on Local Government
- Assembly Committee on Medicaid Reform and Oversight
- Assembly Committee on Mental Health
- Assembly Committee on Public Benefit Reform
- Assembly Committee on Regulatory Licensing Reform
- Assembly Committee on Rules
- Assembly Committee on Rural Development
- Assembly Committee on Science and Technology
- Assembly Committee on Small Business Development
- Assembly Committee on Sporting Heritage
- Assembly Committee on State Affairs
- Assembly Committee on Substance Abuse and Prevention
- Assembly Committee on Tourism
- Assembly Committee on Transportation
- Assembly Committee on Veterans and Military Affairs
- Assembly Committee on Ways and Means
- Assembly Committee on Workforce Development
- Assembly Speaker's Task Force on Adoption
- Assembly Speaker's Task Force on Racial Disparities
- Assembly Speaker's Task Force on Suicide Prevention
- Assembly Subcommittee on Education and Economic Development
- Assembly Subcommittee on Law Enforcement Policies and Standards

== Employees ==
=== Senate employees ===
- Chief Clerk: Jeff Renk
- Sergeant at Arms: Ted Blazel

=== Assembly employees ===
- Chief Clerk: Patrick Fuller
- Sergeant at Arms: Anne Tonnon Byers

== See also ==
- 2016 Wisconsin elections
  - 2016 Wisconsin State Senate election
- 2018 Wisconsin elections
  - 2018 Wisconsin State Senate election
  - 2018 Wisconsin State Assembly election
