= 103rd Wisconsin Legislature =

Wisconsin legislative term for 2017–2018

←	102nd	104th	→
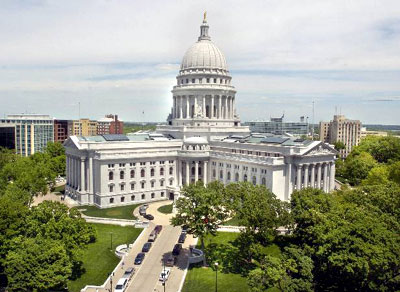
- Wisconsin State Capitol

Overview
- Legislative body: Wisconsin Legislature
- Meeting place: Wisconsin State Capitol
- Term: January 4, 2017 – January 7, 2019
- Election: November 8, 2016

Senate
- Members: 33
- Senate President: Roger Roth (R)
- President pro tempore: Howard Marklein (R)
- Party control: Republican

Assembly
- Members: 99
- Assembly Speaker: Robin Vos (R)
- Speaker pro tempore: Tyler August (R)
- Party control: Republican

Sessions
- Regular: January 3, 2017 – January 7, 2019

Special sessions
- Jan. 2017 Spec.: January 5, 2017 – June 14, 2017
- Aug. 2017 Spec.: August 1, 2017 – September 15, 2017
- Jan. 2018 Spec.: January 18, 2018 – February 27, 2018
- Mar. 2018 Spec.: March 15, 2018 – March 29, 2018
- Mar. 2018 Extra.: March 27, 2018 – March 29, 2018
- Apr. 2018 Extra.: April 4, 2018 – April 4, 2018
- Nov. 2018 Extra.: November 12, 2018 – January 7, 2019
- Dec. 2018 Extra.: December 3, 2018 – December 5, 2018

The One Hundred Third Wisconsin Legislature convened from January 3, 2017, to January 7, 2019, in regular session, though it adjourned for legislative activity on May 9, 2018. The Legislature also held four extraordinary sessions and four special sessions during the legislative term.

The most notable work of this legislature occurred in the last month of the term, at the extraordinary sessions after the 2018 election, in which the Republican Legislature and outgoing Republican governor passed laws to limit powers of the incoming Democratic governor and attorney general.

Senators representing even-numbered districts were newly elected for this session and were serving the first two years of a four-year term. Assembly members were elected to a two-year term. Assembly members and even-numbered senators were elected in the general election held on November 8, 2016. Senators representing odd-numbered districts were serving the third and fourth year of their four-year term, having been elected in the general election held on November 4, 2014.

The governor of Wisconsin during this entire term was Republican Scott Walker, of Milwaukee County, serving the second two years of his second four-year term, having won re-election in the 2014 Wisconsin gubernatorial election.

== Major events ==
- January 20, 2017: Inauguration of Donald Trump as 45th President of the United States.
- May 17, 2017: Former FBI Director Robert Mueller was appointed special counsel to investigate Russian interference in the 2016 U.S. presidential election.
- January 20, 2018: U.S. federal government shutdown began, due to dispute over the Deferred Action for Childhood Arrivals program.
- January 22, 2018: U.S. federal government shutdown ended.
- April 3, 2018: 2018 Wisconsin spring election:
  - Rebecca Dallet was elected to the Wisconsin Supreme Court to succeed Michael Gableman.
  - Wisconsin voters rejected an amendment to the state constitution which would have eliminated the office of State Treasurer of Wisconsin.
- November 6, 2018: 2018 United States general election:
  - Tony Evers (D) elected Governor of Wisconsin.
  - Tammy Baldwin (D) elected United States senator from Wisconsin.
- December 22, 2018: U.S. federal government shutdown began, due to dispute over funding for President Donald Trump's planned Mexico–United States border wall expansion.

== Major legislation ==
- December 15, 2018:
  - An Act relating to: legislative powers and duties, state agency and authority composition and operations, absentee ballots, and administrative rule-making process, 2017 Act 369.
  - An Act relating to: federal government waivers and other requests for federal approval; public assistance programs; waivers from work search and registration requirements for certain unemployment insurance benefit claimants; granting rule-making authority; and making an appropriation, 2017 Act 370.

== Party summary ==
=== Senate summary ===
Senate Partisan composition Democratic: 13 seats Republican: 20 seats

	Party (Shading indicates majority caucus)		Total	
	Democratic	Republican	Total	Vacant
End of previous Legislature	14	18	32	1
Start of Reg. Session	13	20	33	0
From Nov. 10, 2017 (Note: Republican Sheila Harsdorf (10th district) resigned to accept an appointment to state office.)	13	19	32	1
From Dec. 29, 2017 (Note: Republican Frank Lasee (1st district) resigned.)	13	18	31	2
From Jan. 26, 2018 (Note: Democrat Patty Schachtner (10th district) was sworn in to succeed Sheila Harsdorf.)	14	18	32	1
From Jun. 28, 2018 (Note: Democrat Caleb Frostman (1st district) was sworn in to succeed Frank Lasee.)	15	18	33	0
Final voting share	45.45%	54.55%		
Beginning of the next Legislature	14	19	33	0

=== Assembly summary ===
Assembly Partisan composition Democratic: 35 seats Republican: 64 seats

	Party (Shading indicates majority caucus)		Total	
	Democratic	Republican	Total	Vacant
End of previous Legislature	36	63	99	0
Start of Reg. Session	35	64	99	0
From Oct. 3, 2017 (Note: Republican Bob Gannon (58th district) resigned.)	35	63	98	1
From Dec. 29, 2017 (Note: Republican Keith Ripp (42nd district) resigned.)	35	62	97	2
From Jan. 15, 2018 (Note: Democrat Cory Mason (66th district) resigned after his election as mayor.)	34	62	96	3
From Jan. 24, 2018 (Note: Republican Rick Gundrum (58th district) was sworn in to succeed Bob Gannon.)	34	63	97	2
From Jan. 27, 2018 (Note: Democrat Greta Neubauer (66th district) was sworn in to succeed Cory Mason.)	35	63	98	1
From Jun. 25, 2018 (Note: Republican Jon Plumer (42nd district) was sworn in to succeed Keith Ripp.)	35	64	99	0
Final voting share	35.35%	64.65%		
Beginning of the next Legislature	36	63	99	0

== Sessions ==
- Regular session: January 3, 2017 – January 7, 2019
- January 2017 special session: January 5, 2017 – June 14, 2017
- August 2017 special session: August 1, 2017 – September 14, 2017
- January 2018 special session: January 18, 2018 – February 27, 2018
- March 2018 special session: March 15, 2018 – March 29, 2018
- March 2018 extraordinary session: March 27, 2018 – March 29, 2018
- April 2018 extraordinary session: April 4, 2018
- November 2018 extraordinary session: November 12, 2018 – January 7, 2019
- December 2018 extraordinary session: December 3, 2018 – December 5, 2018

== Leadership ==
=== Senate leadership ===
- President of the Senate: Roger Roth (R–Appleton)
- President pro tempore: Howard Marklein (R–Spring Green)

Senate majority leadership (Republican)

- Senate Majority Leader: Scott L. Fitzgerald (R–Juneau)
- Assistant Majority Leader: Leah Vukmir (R–Wauwatosa)
- Senate Majority Caucus Chair: Sheila Harsdorf (R–River Falls) (until Nov. 10, 2017)
  - Van H. Wanggaard (R–Racine) (after Nov. 10, 2017)
- Senate Majority Caucus Vice Chair: Van H. Wanggaard (R–Racine) (until Nov. 10, 2017)
  - Patrick Testin (R–Stevens Point) (after Nov. 10, 2017)

Senate minority leadership (Democratic)

- Senate Minority Leader: Jennifer Shilling (D–La Crosse)
- Assistant Minority Leader: Janet Bewley (D–Mason)
- Senate Minority Caucus Chair: Mark F. Miller (D–Monona)
- Senate Minority Caucus Vice Chair: Janis Ringhand (D–Evansville)

=== Assembly leadership ===
- Speaker of the Assembly: Robin Vos (R–Burlington)
- Speaker pro tempore: Tyler August (R–Lake Geneva)

Assembly majority leadership (Republican)

- Assembly Majority Leader: Jim Steineke (R–Kaukauna)
- Assistant Majority Leader: Robert Brooks (R–Saukville)
- Assembly Majority Caucus Chair: Dan Knodl (R–Germantown)
- Assembly Majority Caucus Vice Chair: Romaine Quinn (R–Rice Lake)
- Assembly Majority Caucus Secretary: Jessie Rodriguez (R–Oak Creek)
- Assembly Majority Caucus Sergeant-at-Arms: Samantha Kerkman (R–Salem)

Assembly minority leadership (Democratic)

- Assembly Minority Leader: Peter Barca (D–Kenosha) (until Sep. 30, 2017)
  - Gordon Hintz (D–Oshkosh) (after Sep. 30, 2017)
- Assistant Minority Leader: Dianne Hesselbein (D–Middleton)
- Assembly Minority Caucus Chair: Mark Spreitzer (D–Beloit)
- Assembly Minority Caucus Vice Chair: Steve Doyle (D–Onalaska)
- Assembly Minority Caucus Secretary: Beth Meyers (D–Bayfield)
- Assembly Minority Caucus Sergeant-at-Arms: Christine Sinicki (D–Milwaukee)

== Members ==
=== Members of the Senate ===
Members of the Wisconsin Senate for the One Hundred Third Wisconsin Legislature:

Senate partisan representation Democratic: 13 seats Republican: 20 seats

Dist.	Senator	Party	Age (2017)	Home	First elected
01	Frank Lasee (res. Dec. 29, 2017)	Rep.	55	Ledgeview, Brown County	2010
01	Caleb Frostman (from Jun. 28, 2018)	Dem.	33	Sturgeon Bay, Door County	2018
02	Robert Cowles	Rep.	66	Green Bay, Brown County	1987
03	Tim Carpenter	Dem.	56	Milwaukee, Milwaukee County	2002
04	Lena Taylor	Dem.	50	Milwaukee, Milwaukee County	2004
05	Leah Vukmir	Rep.	58	Brookfield, Waukesha County	2010
06	LaTonya Johnson	Dem.	44	Milwaukee, Milwaukee County	2016
07	Chris Larson	Dem.	36	Milwaukee, Milwaukee County	2010
08	Alberta Darling	Rep.	72	River Hills, Milwaukee County	1992
09	Devin LeMahieu	Rep.	44	Oostburg, Sheboygan County	2014
10	Sheila Harsdorf (res. Nov. 10, 2017)	Rep.	60	River Falls, Pierce County	2000
10	Patty Schachtner (from Jan. 26, 2018)	Dem.	57–58	Somerset, St. Croix County	2018
11	Stephen Nass	Rep.	64	La Grange, Walworth County	2014
12	Tom Tiffany	Rep.	59	Little Rice, Oneida County	2012
13	Scott L. Fitzgerald	Rep.	53	Juneau, Dodge County	1994
14	Luther Olsen	Rep.	65	Ripon, Fond du Lac County	2004
15	Janis Ringhand	Dem.	66	Evansville, Rock County	2014
16	Mark F. Miller	Dem.	73	Monona, Dane County	2004
17	Howard Marklein	Rep.	62	Spring Green, Sauk County	2014
18	Dan Feyen	Rep.	48–49	Fond du Lac, Fond du Lac County	2016
19	Roger Roth	Rep.	38	Appleton, Outagamie County	2014
20	Duey Stroebel	Rep.	57	Saukville, Ozaukee County	2015
21	Van H. Wanggaard	Rep.	64	Racine, Racine County	2010
22	Robert Wirch	Dem.	73	Somers, Kenosha County	1996
23	Terry Moulton	Rep.	70	Chippewa Falls, Chippewa County	2010
24	Patrick Testin	Rep.	28	Stevens Point, Portage County	2016
25	Janet Bewley	Dem.	65	Mason, Bayfield County	2014
26	Fred Risser	Dem.	89	Madison, Dane County	1962
27	Jon Erpenbach	Dem.	55	Middleton, Dane County	1998
28	Dave Craig	Rep.	37	Big Bend, Waukesha County	2016
29	Jerry Petrowski	Rep.	66	Marathon, Marathon County	2012
30	Dave Hansen	Dem.	69	Green Bay, Brown County	2000
31	Kathleen Vinehout	Dem.	58	Alma, Buffalo County	2006
32	Jennifer Shilling	Dem.	47	La Crosse, La Crosse County	2011
33	Chris Kapenga	Rep.	44	Delafield, Waukesha County	2015

=== Members of the Assembly ===
Members of the Assembly for the One Hundred Third Wisconsin Legislature:

Assembly partisan representation Democratic: 35 seats Republican: 64 seats

Senate District	Assembly District	Representative	Party	Age (2017)	Residence	First Elected
01	01	Joel Kitchens	Rep.	59	Sturgeon Bay	2014
01	02	André Jacque	Rep.	36	De Pere	2010
01	03	Ron Tusler	Rep.	32	Appleton	2016
02	04	David Steffen	Rep.	44	Howard	2014
02	05	Jim Steineke	Rep.	46	Kaukauna	2010
02	06	Gary Tauchen	Rep.	63	Bonduel	2006
03	07	Daniel Riemer	Dem.	30	Milwaukee	2012
03	08	JoCasta Zamarripa	Dem.	40	Milwaukee	2010
03	09	Josh Zepnick	Dem.	48	Milwaukee	2002
04	10	David Bowen	Dem.	29	Milwaukee	2014
04	11	Jason Fields	Dem.	42	Milwaukee	2004
04	12	Fred Kessler	Dem.	76	Milwaukee	1960
05	13	Rob Hutton	Rep.	49	Brookfield	2012
05	14	Dale P. Kooyenga	Rep.	37	Brookfield	2010
05	15	Joe Sanfelippo	Rep.	52	New Berlin	2012
06	16	Leon Young	Dem.	49	Milwaukee	1992
06	17	David Crowley	Dem.	30	Milwaukee	2016
06	18	Evan Goyke	Dem.	34	Milwaukee	2012
07	19	Jonathan Brostoff	Dem.	33	Milwaukee	2014
07	20	Christine Sinicki	Dem.	56	Bay View	1998
07	21	Jessie Rodriguez	Rep.	39	Oak Creek	2013
08	22	Janel Brandtjen	Rep.	50	Waukesha	2014
08	23	Jim Ott	Rep.	69	Mequon	2006
08	24	Dan Knodl	Rep.	58	Germantown	2008
09	25	Paul Tittl	Rep.	55	Manitowoc	2012
09	26	Terry Katsma	Rep.	58	Oostburg	2014
09	27	Tyler Vorpagel	Rep.	31	Plymouth	2014
10	28	Adam Jarchow	Rep.	38	Balsam Lake	2014
10	29	Rob Stafsholt	Rep.		New Richmond	2016
10	30	Shannon Zimmerman	Rep.	44	River Falls	2016
11	31	Amy Loudenbeck	Rep.	47	Clinton	2010
11	32	Tyler August	Rep.	33	Walworth	2010
11	33	Cody Horlacher	Rep.	29	Mukwonago	2014
12	34	Rob Swearingen	Rep.	53	Rhinelander	2012
12	35	Mary Czaja-Felzkowski	Rep.	53	Tomahawk	2012
12	36	Jeffrey Mursau	Rep.	62	Crivitz	2004
13	37	John Jagler	Rep.	47	Watertown	2012
13	38	Joel Kleefisch	Rep.	45	Oconomowoc	2004
13	39	Mark Born	Rep.	40	Beaver Dam	2012
14	40	Kevin David Petersen	Rep.	52	Waupaca	2006
14	41	Joan Ballweg	Rep.	64	Markesan	2004
14	42	Keith Ripp (res. Dec. 29, 2017)	Rep.	55	Lodi	2008
14	42	Jon Plumer (from Jun. 25, 2018)	Rep.	63	Lodi	2018
15	43	Don Vruwink	Dem.	64	Milton	2016
15	44	Debra Kolste	Dem.	63	Janesville	2012
15	45	Mark Spreitzer	Dem.	30	Beloit	2014
16	46	Gary Hebl	Dem.	65	Sun Prairie	2004
16	47	Jimmy P. Anderson	Dem.	30	Fitchburg	2016
16	48	Melissa Agard Sargent	Dem.	47	Madison	2012
17	49	Travis Tranel	Rep.	31	Cuba City	2010
17	50	Edward Brooks	Rep.	74	Reedsburg	2008
17	51	Todd Novak	Rep.	51	Dodgeville	2014
18	52	Jeremy Thiesfeldt	Rep.	50	Fond du Lac	2010
18	53	Michael Schraa	Rep.	55	Oshkosh	2012
18	54	Gordon Hintz	Dem.	43	Oshkosh	2006
19	55	Mike Rohrkaste	Rep.	58	Neenah	2014
19	56	Dave Murphy	Rep.	62	Greenville	2012
19	57	Amanda Stuck	Dem.	34	Appleton	2014
20	58	Bob Gannon (d. Oct. 3, 2017)	Rep.	57	Slinger	2014
20	58	Rick Gundrum (from Jan. 24, 2018)	Rep.	52	Slinger	2018
20	59	Jesse Kremer	Rep.	39	Kewaskum	2014
20	60	Robert Brooks	Rep.	51	Saukville	2011
21	61	Samantha Kerkman	Rep.	42	Powers Lake	2000
21	62	Tom Weatherston	Rep.	59	Racine	2012
21	63	Robin Vos	Rep.	48	Rochester	2004
22	64	Peter W. Barca	Dem.	61	Kenosha	1984
22	65	Tod Ohnstad	Dem.	64	Kenosha	2012
22	66	Cory Mason (res. Jan. 15, 2018)	Dem.	43	Racine	2006
22	66	Greta Neubauer (from Jan. 27, 2018)	Dem.	26	Racine	2018
23	67	Rob Summerfield	Rep.	36	Bloomer	2016
23	68	Kathy Bernier	Rep.	60	Chippewa Falls	2010
23	69	Bob Kulp	Rep.	50	Stratford	2013
24	70	Nancy VanderMeer	Rep.	58	Tomah	2014
24	71	Katrina Shankland	Dem.	29	Stevens Point	2012
24	72	Scott Krug	Rep.	41	Wisconsin Rapids	2010
25	73	Nick Milroy	Dem.	42	Superior	2008
25	74	Beth Meyers	Dem.	57	Bayfield	2014
25	75	Romaine Quinn	Rep.	26	Cameron	2014
26	76	Chris Taylor	Dem.	48	Madison	2011
26	77	Terese Berceau	Dem.	66	Madison	1998
26	78	Lisa Subeck	Dem.	45	Madison	2014
27	79	Dianne Hesselbein	Dem.	45	Middleton	2012
27	80	Sondy Pope-Roberts	Dem.	66	Mount Horeb	2002
27	81	Dave Considine	Dem.	64	Baraboo	2014
28	82	Ken Skowronski	Rep.	78	Franklin	2013
28	83	Chuck Wichgers	Rep.	51	Muskego	2016
28	84	Mike Kuglitsch	Rep.	56	New Berlin	2010
29	85	Patrick Snyder	Rep.	60	Schofield	2016
29	86	John Spiros	Rep.	55	Marshfield	2012
29	87	James W. Edming	Rep.	71	Glen Flora	2014
30	88	John Macco	Rep.	58	De Pere	2014
30	89	John Nygren	Rep.	52	Marinette	2006
30	90	Eric Genrich	Dem.	37	Green Bay	2012
31	91	Dana Wachs	Dem.	59	Eau Claire	2012
31	92	Treig Pronschinske	Rep.	49	Mondovi	2016
31	93	Warren Petryk	Rep.	61	Eleva	2010
32	94	Steve Doyle	Dem.	58	Onalaska	2011
32	95	Jill Billings	Dem.	54	La Crosse	2011
32	96	Lee Nerison	Rep.	64	Westby	2004
33	97	Scott Allen	Rep.	51	Waukesha	2014
33	98	Adam Neylon	Rep.	32	Pewaukee	2013
33	99	Cindi Duchow	Rep.	58	Delafield	2015

== Employees ==
=== Senate employees ===
- Chief Clerk: Jeffrey Renk
- Sergeant at Arms: Ted Blazel

=== Assembly employees ===
- Chief Clerk: Patrick Fuller
- Sergeant at Arms: Anne Tonnon Byers

== See also ==
- 2014 Wisconsin elections
- 2016 Wisconsin elections
  - 2016 Wisconsin State Senate election
  - 2016 Wisconsin State Assembly election
