= 2025 Wisconsin Question 1 =

- April 1, 2025
- Require Voter Photo ID Amendment

Results
Choice	Votes	%
Yes	1,437,317	62.79%
No	851,851	37.21%
Valid votes	2,289,168	100.00%
Invalid or blank votes	0	0.00%
Total votes	2,289,168	100.00%
- Yes: 50–60% 60–70% 70–80% 80–90% No: 50–60% 60–70%

2025 Wisconsin Question 1 was a legislatively referred constitutional amendment that appeared on the ballot in the U.S. state of Wisconsin on April 1, 2025. The amendment was ratified by voters, creating a new section 1m in article III of the Constitution of Wisconsin, to establish a constitutional requirement for photographic identification for voting.

The in-person early voting period ran from March 18 to March 30, 2025.

== Background ==
In 2016, the 102nd Wisconsin Legislature passed a law that required photo ID to be displayed before voters would be allowed to register to vote or cast a vote in Wisconsin. The law remains in effect.

After the 2020 election, Republicans in the 106th Wisconsin Legislature determined to add the photo ID requirement to the Constitution of Wisconsin to make the requirement more difficult to repeal in the future. Following the normal constitutional amendment process in Wisconsin, the 106th Legislature passed a joint resolution laying out the new amendment. The resolution was then picked up two years later by the 107th Wisconsin Legislature, which passed it again. In both terms, the resolution was supported by Republicans, and generally opposed by Democrats. After the second passage, the amendment reached its final stage, a vote for ratification by the public, which was scheduled for the next general election, April 1, 2025.

The amendment does not represent a change from current law, but it would require a new constitutional amendment to repeal the voter ID requirement. The existing statutory law would not have been directly impacted by either outcome to the ratification vote.

== Endorsements ==
Yes

Executive branch officials

- Donald Trump, 45th and 47th President of the United States (2017–2021, 2025–present) (Republican)

State legislators

- Van Wanggaard, state senator from the 21st district (2011–2012, 2015–present) (Republican)
- Julian Bradley, state senator from the 28th district (2021–present) (Republican)
- Tyler August, majority leader of the Wisconsin State Assembly (2023–present) from the 31st district (2025–present) and 32nd district (2011–2025) (Republican)
- David Armstrong, state assemblymember from the 67th district (2025–present) and 75th district (2021–2025) (Republican)
- Rob Kreibich, state assemblymember from the 28th district (2025–present) and 93rd district (1993–2007) (Republican)
- Scott Krug, state assemblymember from the 72nd district (2011–present) (Republican)
- Dave Maxey, state assemblymember from the 83rd district (2025–present) and 15th district (2023–2025) (Republican)
- Patrick Snyder, state assemblymember from the 85th district (2017–present) (Republican)
- Amanda Nedweski, state assemblymember from the 32nd district (2025–present) and 61st district (2023–2025) (Republican)
- Jim Steineke, former majority leader of the Wisconsin State Assembly (2015–2022) from the 5th district (2011–2022) (Republican)

Organizations

- Wisconsin Family Action

Political parties

- Republican Party of Wisconsin
No

State legislators

- LaTonya Johnson, state senator from the 6th district (2017–present) (Democratic)
- Kelda Roys, state senator from the 26th district (2021–present) (Democratic)
- Greta Neubauer, minority leader of the Wisconsin State Assembly (2022–present) from the 66th district (2018–present) (Democratic)
- Andrew Hysell, state assemblymember from the 48th district (2025–present) (Democratic)
- Lee Snodgrass, state assemblymember from the 52nd district (2025–present) and 57th district (2021–2025) (Democratic)

Organizations

- American Civil Liberties Union of Wisconsin
- League of Women Voters of Wisconsin
- VoteRiders
- League of Conservation Voters Wisconsin
- Citizen Action of Wisconsin
- Law Forward
- Common Cause Wisconsin

Political parties

- Democratic Party of Wisconsin

== Polling ==
Poll source	Date(s) administered	Sample size (Note: Key: A – all adults RV – registered voters LV – likely voters V – unclear)	Margin of error	Yes	No	Undecided
Marquette University	February 19–26, 2025	865 (RV)	± 4.6%	72.60%	27.05%	0.35%

== Results ==
2025 Wisconsin Question 1
Choice	Votes	%
For	1,437,317	62.79
Against	851,851	37.21
Total	2,289,168	100.00

== See also ==
- 2025 Wisconsin elections
- Constitution of Wisconsin
- 2011 Wisconsin Act 23
