= 106th Wisconsin Legislature =

Wisconsin legislative term for 2023–2024

←	105th	107th	→
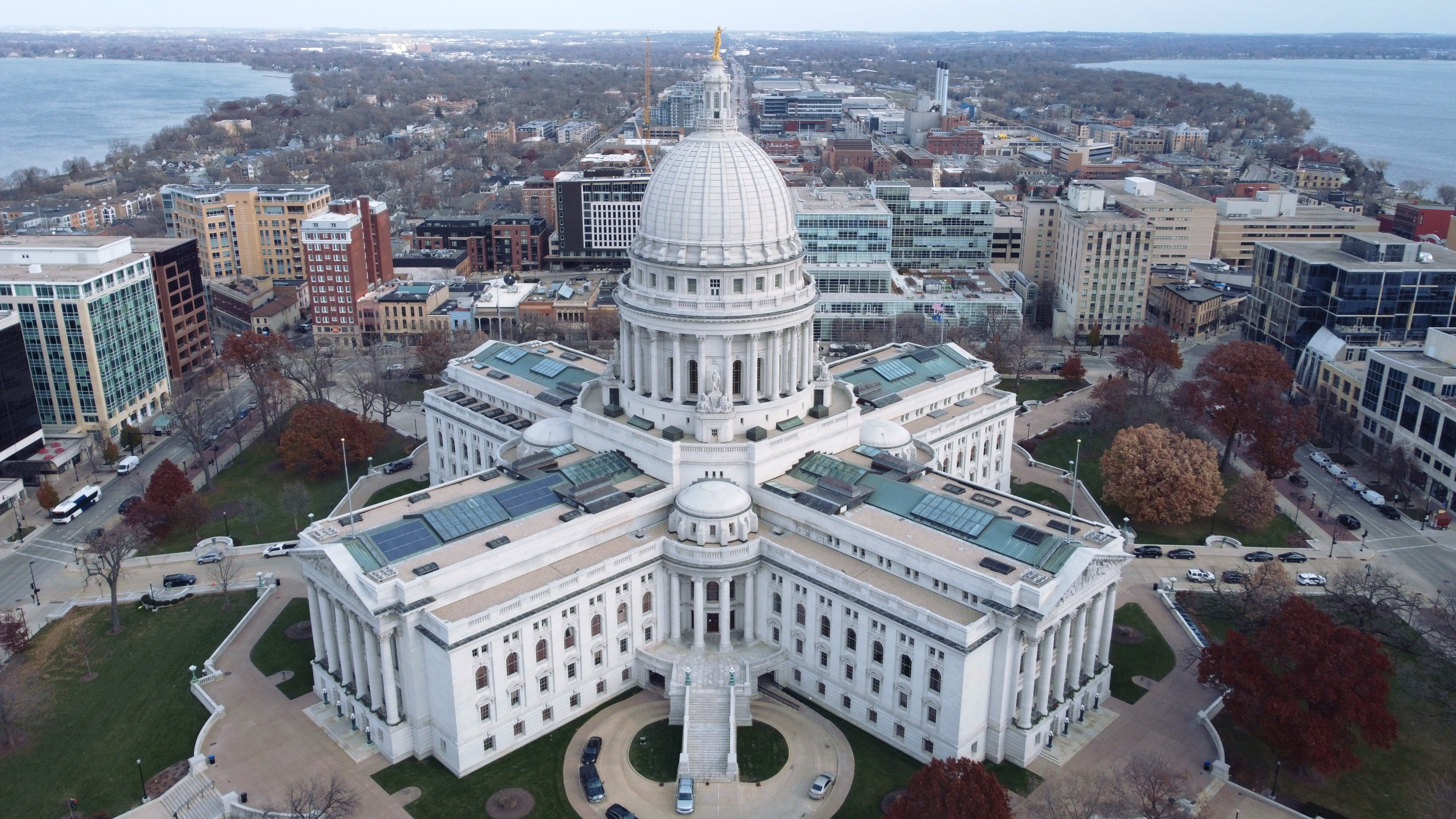
- Wisconsin State Capitol

Overview
- Legislative body: Wisconsin Legislature
- Meeting place: Wisconsin State Capitol
- Term: January 2, 2023 – January 6, 2025
- Election: November 8, 2022

Senate
- Members: 33
- Senate President: Chris Kapenga (R)
- President pro tempore: Patrick Testin (R)
- Party control: Republican

Assembly
- Members: 99
- Assembly Speaker: Robin Vos (R)
- Speaker pro tempore: Kevin D. Petersen (R)
- Party control: Republican

Sessions
- Regular: January 3, 2023 – January 6, 2025

Special sessions
- Sept. 2023 Spec.: September 20, 2023

The One Hundred Sixth Wisconsin Legislature convened from January 3, 2023, to January 6, 2025, in regular session, though it adjourned for legislative activity on March 12, 2024. The Legislature also convened in a special session on September 20, 2023.

This was the only legislative term under the redistricting plan imposed by the Wisconsin Supreme Court in the 2022 case Johnson v. Wisconsin Elections Commission. The district plan was a Republican remedial proposal which closely adhered to districts adopted by the Republican legislature in 2011. During this legislative term, the Wisconsin Supreme Court declared that district plan unconstitutional on technical grounds, and the legislature and governor agreed on a new redistricting plan.

Senators representing odd-numbered districts were elected for this session and served the first two years of a four-year term. Assembly members were elected to a two-year term. Assembly members and odd-numbered senators were elected in the general election of November 8, 2022. Senators representing even-numbered districts were serving the third and fourth year of their four-year term, having been elected in the general election held on November 3, 2020.

The governor of Wisconsin during this entire term was Democrat Tony Evers, of Dane County, serving the first two years of his second four-year term, having won re-election in the 2022 Wisconsin gubernatorial election.

== Major events ==
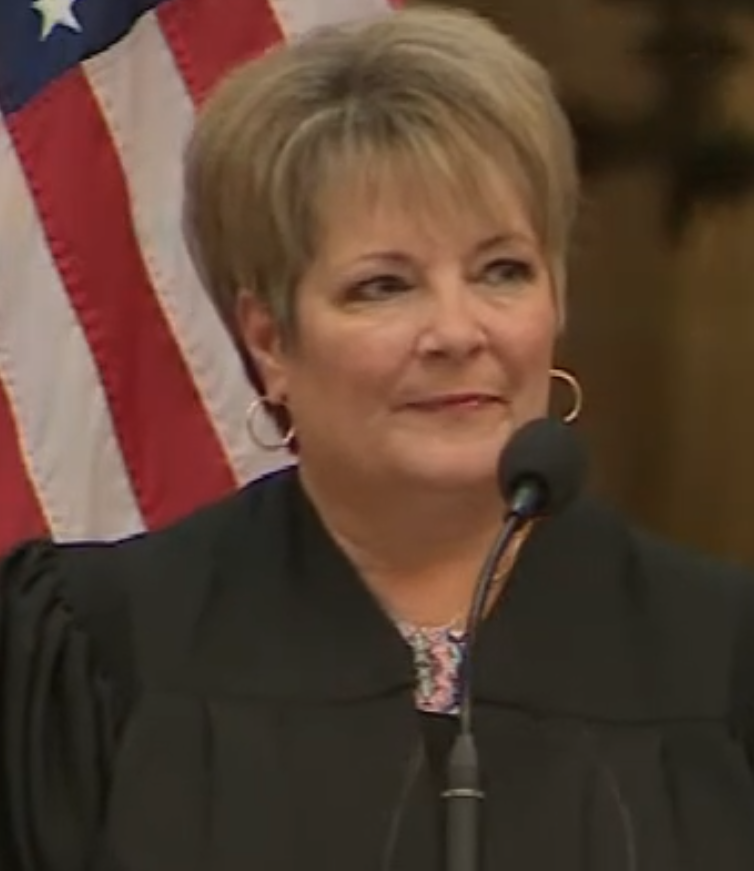
Justice Janet Protasiewicz

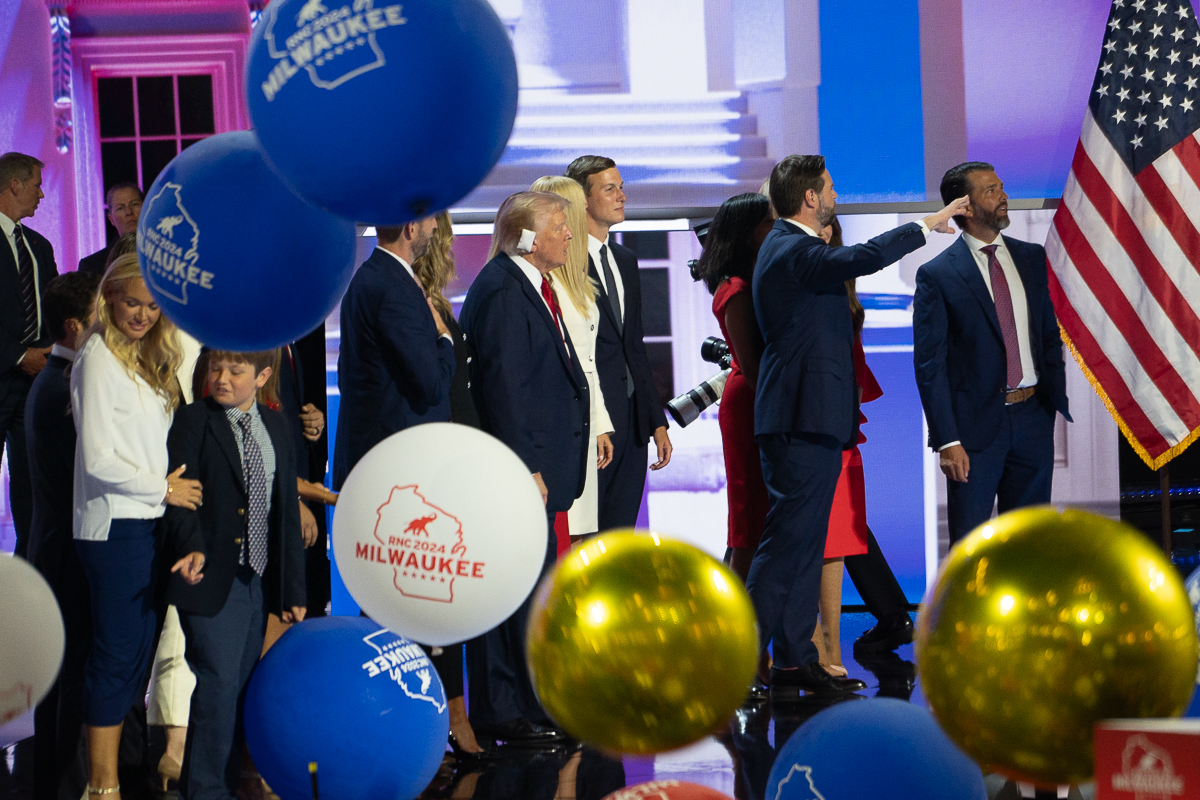
Presidential candidate Donald Trump on stage at the 2024 Republican National Convention in Milwaukee

- January 3, 2023: Second inauguration of Tony Evers as Governor of Wisconsin.
- February 8, 2023: On his first trip after the 2023 State of the Union Address, U.S. President Joe Biden visited Dane County, Wisconsin, and spoke to workers at a LiUNA training center in DeForest, Wisconsin.
- February 12, 2023: Following the 2023 Chinese balloon incident, another suspected Chinese balloon was detected near northern Wisconsin and was shot down over Lake Huron.
- March 17, 2023: Wisconsin's longest-serving statewide elected officer, secretary of state Doug La Follette, retired after more than 40 years in office.
- April 4, 2023: 2023 Wisconsin Spring election:
  - Janet Protasiewicz was elected to the Wisconsin Supreme Court to succeed Patience Roggensack.
  - Wisconsin voters ratified two amendments to the state constitution related to guidance to judges on questions of pre-trial release and bail conditions.
  - Dan Knodl won a special election to a vacant seat in the Wisconsin State Senate, giving Republicans a supermajority in the chamber.
- August 8, 2023: Governor Tony Evers called a special session of the Legislature to consider bills related to child care, higher education, and paid family leave.
- September 20, 2023: The Wisconsin legislature opened and closed a special session within 38 seconds in response to the Governor's call for a special session devoted to bringing down soaring child care costs in the state.
- October 4, 2023: A man carrying a loaded pistol was arrested at the Wisconsin State Capitol while seeking a meeting with Wisconsin governor Tony Evers. The man made bail and returned later in the same day with a loaded rifle, and was arrested again.
- December 22, 2023: The Wisconsin Supreme Court released their decision in the case of Clarke v. Wisconsin Elections Commission, finding that Wisconsin's legislative maps were unconstitutional and had to be re-drawn.
- January 26, 2024: The Wisconsin Department of Natural Resources established a protected conservation area of 67,000 acres of land in Pelican River Forest in northern Wisconsin, one of the largest conservation projects in state history.
- April 2, 2024: 2024 Wisconsin spring election:
  - Wisconsin voters ratified two amendments to the state constitution:
    - To restrict local elections administrators from soliciting or accepting private donations or grants to support election administration.
    - To restrict participation in election administration to only those described in law.
- July 15, 2024: The 2024 Republican National Convention began in Milwaukee, Wisconsin.
- August 13, 2024: Wisconsin fall partisan primary:
  - Wisconsin voters rejected two amendments to the state constitution:
    - To require that all state spending must be specifically appropriated by the legislature, not delegated to the executive or other agency.
    - To require the governor to seek legislative approval before spending any money received from the federal government.
- November 5, 2024: 2024 United States general election:
  - Donald Trump (R) elected President of the United States.
  - Tammy Baldwin (D) re-elected United States senator from Wisconsin.
  - Wisconsin voters ratified an amendment to the state constitution altering the language around the right to vote.
- December 16, 2024: A school shooting occurred at Abundant Life Christian School in Madison, Wisconsin.

== Major legislation ==
- Criminal bail and release:
  - January 19, 2023: Joint Resolution to amend section 8 (2) of article I of the constitution; relating to: conditions for release prior to conviction, including the imposition of bail (second consideration), 2023 Senate Joint Resolution 2. Second legislative passage of a proposed amendment to the Constitution of Wisconsin.
  - April 6, 2023: An Act ... relating to: statutory changes to implement the constitutional amendment relating to conditions of release, 2023 Act 3. Updated state law to reflect the constitutional amendments ratified in 2023 relating to bail.
- Municipal and County Taxes: June 21, 2023: An Act ... relating to: county and municipal aid; imposing a city and county sales tax to pay the unfunded liability of city and county retirement systems; requiring certain newly hired city and county employees to be enrolled in the Wisconsin Retirement System; fire and police commissions of first class cities; eliminating the personal property tax; reporting certain crimes and other incidents on school property or school transportation; advisory referendums; local health officers; local public protection services; local levy limits; local regulation of certain quarry operations; emergency services; local approval of projects and activities under the Warren Knowles-Gaylord Nelson Stewardship 2000 Program; and granting rule-making authority, 2023 Act 12. A long-overdue compromise allowing Wisconsin municipalities to raise revenue. Shared revenue for Wisconsin municipalities was slashed in 2011 and placed on an unsustainable trajectory in order to give the appearance of a state budget surplus, at the same time local options to raise revenue independent of state authority were also constrained. This act allowed some easing of those rules to allow municipalities to avoid bankruptcy or mass layoffs.
- Appropriations: July 6, 2023: An Act relating to: state finances and appropriations, constituting the executive budget act of the 2023 legislature, 2023 Act 19. Vetoed in part.
- Baseball Facilities:
  - December 6, 2023: An Act ... relating to: baseball park district administration, funding for improvement of professional baseball park facilities, use of the Milwaukee County sales tax, expiration of the Milwaukee County sales tax, and Milwaukee County pension obligation bonds, 2023 Act 40. Setting up funding sources for improvements to American Family Field to ensure that the Milwaukee Brewers franchise remains in Milwaukee.
  - December 6, 2023: An Act ... relating to: funding for improvement of baseball park facilities, administration of county and municipal sales taxes, and making an appropriation, 2023 Act 41. Along with Act 40, providing funding for improvements to the American Family Field to ensure that the Milwaukee Brewers franchise remains in Milwaukee.
- Redistricting: February 19, 2024: An Act ... relating to: legislative redistricting, 2023 Act 94. This was a remedial legislative redistricting plan, passed by the legislature after the Wisconsin Supreme Court struck down the existing map. If the law stands, it will be the end of 12 years of extreme partisan gerrymandering in the Wisconsin legislature.

== Party summary ==
=== Senate summary ===
Senate Partisan composition Democratic: 10 seats Republican: 22 seats Vacant: 1 seat

Affiliation	Party (Shading indicates majority caucus)		Total	
Affiliation	Democratic	Republican	Total	Vacant
End of previous legislature	12	21	33	0
Start of session (Note: Republican Alberta Darling (District 8) resigned before the start of the session.)	11	21	32	1
From May 3, 2023 (Note: Republican Dan Knodl (District 8) was sworn in to replace Alberta Darling.)	11	22	33	0
From Jan. 26, 2024 (Note: Democrat Lena Taylor (District 4) resigned after being appointed a Wisconsin circuit court judge.)	10	22	32	1
Final voting share	31.25%	68.75%		
Beginning of next session	15	18	33	0

=== Assembly summary ===
Assembly Partisan composition Democratic: 35 seats Republican: 64 seats

Affiliation	Party (Shading indicates majority caucus)		Total	
Affiliation	Democratic	Republican	Total	Vacant
End of previous legislature	38	57	95	4
Start of session	35	64	99	0
From May 3, 2023 (Note: Republican Dan Knodl (District 24) resigned to take office in the State Senate.)	35	63	98	1
From Aug. 7, 2023 (Note: Republican Paul Melotik (District 24) sworn in to replace Dan Knodl.)	35	64	99	0
From Jul. 31, 2024 (Note: Democrat Marisabel Cabrera (District 9) resigned after her election as a circuit judge.)	34	64	98	1
Final voting share	34.69%	65.31%		
Beginning of next session	45	54	99	0

== Sessions ==
- Regular session: January 3, 2023 – January 6, 2025
- September 2023 special session: September 20, 2023

== Leadership ==
=== Senate leadership ===
- President of the Senate: Chris Kapenga (R–Delafield)
- President pro tempore: Patrick Testin (R–Stevens Point)

Senate majority leadership (Republican)

- Senate Majority Leader: Devin LeMahieu (R–Oostburg)
- Assistant Majority Leader: Dan Feyen (R–Fond du Lac)
- Senate Majority Caucus Chair: Van H. Wanggaard (R–Racine)
- Senate Majority Caucus Vice Chair: Joan Ballweg (R–Markesan)

Senate minority leadership (Democratic)

- Senate Minority Leader: Melissa Agard (D–Madison) (until Dec. 1, 2023)
  - Dianne Hesselbein (D–Middleton) (after Dec. 1, 2023)
- Assistant Minority Leader: Jeff Smith (D–Brunswick)
- Senate Minority Caucus Chair: Chris Larson (D–Milwaukee)
- Senate Minority Caucus Vice Chair: Dianne Hesselbein (D–Middleton) (until Dec. 1, 2023)
  - Mark Spreitzer (D–Beloit) (after Dec. 1, 2023)

=== Assembly leadership ===
- Speaker of the Assembly: Robin Vos (R–Rochester)
- Speaker pro tempore: Kevin David Petersen (R–Waupaca)

Assembly majority leadership (Republican)

- Assembly Majority Leader: Tyler August (R–Lake Geneva)
- Assistant Majority Leader: Jon Plumer (R–Lodi)
- Assembly Majority Caucus Chair: Rob Summerfield (R–Bloomer)
- Assembly Majority Caucus Vice Chair: Cindi Duchow (R–Delafield)
- Assembly Majority Caucus Secretary: Nancy VanderMeer (R–Tomah)
- Assembly Majority Caucus Sergeant-at-Arms: Treig Pronschinske (R–Mondovi)

Assembly minority leadership (Democratic)

- Assembly Minority Leader: Greta Neubauer (D–Racine)
- Assistant Minority Leader: Kalan Haywood (D–Milwaukee)
- Assembly Minority Caucus Chair: Lisa Subeck (D–Madison)
- Assembly Minority Caucus Vice Chair: Jill Billings (D–La Crosse)
- Assembly Minority Caucus Secretary: Kristina Shelton (D–Green Bay)
- Assembly Minority Caucus Sergeant-at-Arms: Lee Snodgrass (D–Appleton)

== Members ==
=== Members of the Senate ===
Members of the Senate for the One Hundred Sixth Wisconsin Legislature:

Senate partisan representation Democratic: 11 seats Republican: 22 seats

Dist.	Senator	Party	Age	Home	First elected
01	André Jacque	Rep.	42	De Pere, Brown County	2018
02	Robert Cowles	Rep.	72	Green Bay, Brown County	1987
03	Tim Carpenter	Dem.	62	Milwaukee, Milwaukee County	2002
04	Lena Taylor (res. Jan. 26, 2024)	Dem.	56	Milwaukee, Milwaukee County	2004
04	--Vacant since Jan. 26, 2024--				
05	Rob Hutton	Rep.	55	Brookfield, Waukesha County	2022
06	LaTonya Johnson	Dem.	50	Milwaukee, Milwaukee County	2016
07	Chris Larson	Dem.	42	Milwaukee, Milwaukee County	2010
08	--Vacant until May 3, 2023--				
08	Dan Knodl (from May 3, 2023)	Rep.	64	Germantown, Washington County	2023
09	Devin LeMahieu	Rep.	50	Oostburg, Sheboygan County	2014
10	Rob Stafsholt	Rep.	47	New Richmond, St. Croix County	2020
11	Stephen Nass	Rep.	70	Whitewater, Walworth County	2014
12	Mary Felzkowski	Rep.	59	Irma, Lincoln County	2020
13	John Jagler	Rep.	53	Watertown, Jefferson County	2021
14	Joan Ballweg	Rep.	70	Markesan, Green Lake County	2020
15	Mark Spreitzer	Dem.	36	Beloit, Rock County	2022
16	Melissa Agard	Dem.	53	Madison, Dane County	2020
17	Howard Marklein	Rep.	68	Spring Green, Sauk County	2014
18	Dan Feyen	Rep.	54	Fond du Lac, Fond du Lac County	2016
19	Rachael Cabral-Guevara	Rep.	46	Appleton, Outagamie County	2022
20	Duey Stroebel	Rep.	63	Saukville, Ozaukee County	2015
21	Van H. Wanggaard	Rep.	70	Racine, Racine County	2014
22	Robert Wirch	Dem.	79	Somers, Kenosha County	1996
23	Jesse James	Rep.	50	Altoona, Eau Claire County	2022
24	Patrick Testin	Rep.	34	Stevens Point, Portage County	2016
25	Romaine Quinn	Rep.	32	Cameron, Barron County	2022
26	Kelda Roys	Dem.	43	Madison, Dane County	2020
27	Dianne Hesselbein	Dem.	51	Middleton, Dane County	2022
28	Julian Bradley	Rep.	41	Franklin, Milwaukee County	2020
29	Cory Tomczyk	Rep.	60	Mosinee, Marathon County	2022
30	Eric Wimberger	Rep.	43	Green Bay, Brown County	2020
31	Jeff Smith	Dem.	67	Brunswick, Eau Claire County	2018
32	Brad Pfaff	Dem.	55	Onalaska, La Crosse County	2020
33	Chris Kapenga	Rep.	50	Delafield, Waukesha County	2015

=== Members of the Assembly ===
Members of the Assembly for the One Hundred Sixth Wisconsin Legislature:

Sen. Dist.	Dist.	Representative	Party	Age	Residence	First Elected
01	01	Joel Kitchens	Rep.	65	Sturgeon Bay	2014
01	02	Shae Sortwell	Rep.	37	Two Rivers	2018
01	03	Ron Tusler	Rep.	38	Harrison	2016
02	04	David Steffen	Rep.	51	Green Bay	2014
02	05	Joy Goeben	Rep.	50	Hobart	2022
02	06	Peter Schmidt	Rep.	30	Bonduel	2022
03	07	Daniel Riemer	Dem.	36	Milwaukee	2012
03	08	Sylvia Ortiz-Velez	Dem.		Milwaukee	2020
03	09	Marisabel Cabrera (res. Jul. 31, 2024)	Dem.	47	Milwaukee	2018
03	09	--Vacant from Aug. 1, 2024--				
04	10	Darrin Madison	Dem.	27	Milwaukee	2022
04	11	Dora Drake	Dem.	29	Milwaukee	2020
04	12	LaKeshia Myers	Dem.	38	Milwaukee	2018
05	13	Tom Michalski	Rep.	71	Elm Grove	2022
05	14	Robyn Vining	Dem.	46	Wauwatosa	2018
05	15	Dave Maxey	Rep.	50	New Berlin	2022
06	16	Kalan Haywood	Dem.	23	Milwaukee	2018
06	17	Supreme Moore Omokunde	Dem.	43	Milwaukee	2020
06	18	Evan Goyke	Dem.	40	Milwaukee	2012
07	19	Ryan Clancy	Dem.	46	Milwaukee	2022
07	20	Christine Sinicki	Dem.	62	Milwaukee	1998
07	21	Jessie Rodriguez	Rep.	45	Oak Creek	2013
08	22	Janel Brandtjen	Rep.	56	Menomonee Falls	2014
08	23	Deb Andraca	Dem.	52	Whitefish Bay	2020
08	24	Dan Knodl (res. May 3, 2023)	Rep.	64	Germantown	2008
08	24	Paul Melotik (from Aug. 7, 2023)	Rep.	66	Grafton	2023
09	25	Paul Tittl	Rep.	61	Manitowoc	2012
09	26	Terry Katsma	Rep.	64	Oostburg	2014
09	27	Amy Binsfeld	Rep.	47	Sheboygan	2022
10	28	Gae Magnafici	Rep.	70	Dresser	2018
10	29	Clint Moses	Rep.	46	Menomonie	2020
10	30	Shannon Zimmerman	Rep.	50	River Falls	2016
11	31	Ellen Schutt	Rep.	27	Clinton	2022
11	32	Tyler August	Rep.	39	Lake Geneva	2010
11	33	Scott Johnson	Rep.	69	Jefferson	2022
12	34	Rob Swearingen	Rep.	59	Rhinelander	2012
12	35	Calvin Callahan	Rep.	23	Tomahawk	2020
12	36	Jeffrey Mursau	Rep.	68	Crivitz	2004
13	37	William Penterman	Rep.	26	Columbus	2021
13	38	Barbara Dittrich	Rep.	58	Oconomowoc	2018
13	39	Mark Born	Rep.	46	Beaver Dam	2012
14	40	Kevin David Petersen	Rep.	58	Waupaca	2006
14	41	Alex Dallman	Rep.	30	Green Lake	2020
14	42	Jon Plumer	Rep.	67	Lodi	2018
15	43	Jenna Jacobson	Dem.	40	Oregon	2022
15	44	Sue Conley	Dem.	62	Janesville	2020
15	45	Clinton Anderson	Dem.	29	Beloit	2022
16	46	Melissa Ratcliff	Dem.	46	Cottage Grove	2022
16	47	Jimmy P. Anderson	Dem.	36	Fitchburg	2016
16	48	Samba Baldeh	Dem.	52	Madison	2020
17	49	Travis Tranel	Rep.	37	Cuba City	2010
17	50	Tony Kurtz	Rep.	56	Wonewoc	2018
17	51	Todd Novak	Rep.	57	Dodgeville	2014
18	52	Jerry L. O'Connor	Rep.	69	Fond du Lac	2022
18	53	Michael Schraa	Rep.	61	Oshkosh	2012
18	54	Lori Palmeri	Dem.	55	Oshkosh	2022
19	55	Nate Gustafson	Rep.	28	Neenah	2022
19	56	Dave Murphy	Rep.	68	Greenville	2012
19	57	Lee Snodgrass	Dem.	53	Appleton	2020
20	58	Rick Gundrum	Rep.	57	Slinger	2018
20	59	Ty Bodden	Rep.	29	Hilbert	2022
20	60	Robert Brooks	Rep.	57	Saukville	2014
21	61	Amanda Nedweski	Rep.	47	Pleasant Prairie	2022
21	62	Robert Wittke	Rep.	65	Racine	2018
21	63	Robin Vos	Rep.	54	Rochester	2004
22	64	Tip McGuire	Dem.	35	Kenosha	2019
22	65	Tod Ohnstad	Dem.	70	Kenosha	2012
22	66	Greta Neubauer	Dem.	31	Racine	2018
23	67	Rob Summerfield	Rep.	42	Bloomer	2016
23	68	Karen Hurd	Rep.	50	Fall Creek	2022
23	69	Donna Rozar	Rep.	72	Marshfield	2020
24	70	Nancy VanderMeer	Rep.	64	Tomah	2014
24	71	Katrina Shankland	Dem.	35	Stevens Point	2012
24	72	Scott Krug	Rep.	47	Nekoosa	2010
25	73	Angie Sapik	Rep.	38	Lake Nebagamon	2022
25	74	Chanz Green	Rep.	32	Grandview	2022
25	75	David Armstrong	Rep.	61	Rice Lake	2020
26	76	Francesca Hong	Dem.	34	Madison	2020
26	77	Shelia Stubbs	Dem.	51	Madison	2018
26	78	Lisa Subeck	Dem.	51	Madison	2014
27	79	Alex Joers	Dem.	31	Middleton	2022
27	80	Mike Bare	Dem.	37	Verona	2022
27	81	Dave Considine	Dem.	70	Baraboo	2014
28	82	Chuck Wichgers	Rep.	57	Muskego	2016
28	83	Nik Rettinger	Rep.	32	Mukwonago	2022
28	84	Bob Donovan	Rep.	67	Greenfield	2022
29	85	Patrick Snyder	Rep.	66	Schofield	2016
29	86	John Spiros	Rep.	61	Marshfield	2012
29	87	James W. Edming	Rep.	77	Glen Flora	2014
30	88	John Macco	Rep.	64	Ledgeview	2014
30	89	Elijah Behnke	Rep.	39	Oconto	2021
30	90	Kristina Shelton	Dem.	42	Green Bay	2020
31	91	Jodi Emerson	Dem.	49	Eau Claire	2018
31	92	Treig Pronschinske	Rep.	55	Mondovi	2016
31	93	Warren Petryk	Rep.	67	Washington	2010
32	94	Steve Doyle	Dem.	64	Onalaska	2011
32	95	Jill Billings	Dem.	58	La Crosse	2011
32	96	Loren Oldenburg	Rep.	57	Viroqua	2018
33	97	Scott Allen	Rep.	57	Waukesha	2014
33	98	Adam Neylon	Rep.	38	Pewaukee	2013
33	99	Cindi Duchow	Rep.	64	Delafield	2015

== Committees ==
=== Senate committees ===
- Senate Committee on Agriculture and Tourism – J. Ballweg, chair
- Senate Committee on Economic Development and Technical Colleges – D. Feyen, chair
- Senate Committee on Education – J. Jagler, chair
- Senate Committee on Financial Institutions and Sporting Heritage – R. Stafsholt, chair
- Senate Committee on Government Operations – D. Stroebel, chair
- Senate Committee on Health – R. Cabral-Guevara, chair
- Senate Committee on Housing, Rural Issues and Forestry – R. R. Quinn, chair
- Senate Committee on Insurance and Small Business – M. Felzkowski, chair
- Senate Committee on Judiciary and Public Safety – V. Wanggaard, chair
- Senate Committee on Labor, Regulatory Reform, Veterans and Military Affairs – P. Testin, chair
- Senate Committee on Licensing, Constitution and Federalism – A. Jacque, chair
- Senate Committee on Mental Health, Substance Abuse Prevention, Children and Families – J. L. James, chair
- Senate Committee on Natural Resources and Energy – R. L. Cowles, chair
- Senate Committee on Senate Organization – D. LeMahieu, chair
- Senate Committee on Shared Revenue, Elections and Consumer Protection – D. Knodl, chair
- Senate Committee on Transportation and Local Government – C. Tomczyk, chair
- Senate Committee on Universities and Revenue – R. Hutton, chair
- Senate Committee on Utilities and Technology – J. Bradley, chair

=== Assembly committees ===
- Assembly Committee on Agriculture – T. Tranel, chair
- Assembly Committee on Assembly Organization – R. Vos, chair
- Assembly Committee on Audit – R. Wittke, chair
- Assembly Committee on Campaigns and Elections – S. Krug, chair
- Assembly Committee on Children and Families – P. Snyder, chair
- Assembly Committee on Colleges and Universities – D. Murphy, chair
- Assembly Committee on Consumer Protection – C. T. Callahan, chair
- Assembly Committee on Corrections – M. Schraa, chair
- Assembly Committee on Criminal Justice and Public Safety – J. Spiros, chair
- Assembly Committee on Education – J. Kitchens, chair
- Assembly Committee on Energy and Utilities – D. Steffen, chair
- Assembly Committee on Environment – L. Oldenburg, chair
- Assembly Committee on Family Law – D. M. Rozar, chair
- Assembly Committee on Financial Institutions – C. Duchow, chair
- Assembly Committee on Forestry, Parks and Outdoor Recreation – J. Mursau, chair
- Assembly Committee on Government Accountability and Oversight – D. Knodl, chair (until May 3, 2023), D. Steffen, vice-chair
- Assembly Committee on Health, Aging and Long-Term Care – C. P. Moses, chair
- Assembly Committee on Housing and Real Estate – R. Brooks, chair
- Assembly Committee on Insurance – B. Dittrich, chair
- Assembly Committee on Jobs, Economy and Small Business Development – R. Gundrum, chair
- Assembly Committee on Judiciary – R. Tusler, chair
- Assembly Committee on Labor and Integrated Employment – W. Penterman, chair
- Assembly Committee on Local Government – T. Novak, chair
- Assembly Committee on Mental Health and Substance Abuse Prevention – P. Tittl, chair
- Assembly Committee on Regulatory Licensing Reform – S. A. Sortwell, chair
- Assembly Committee on Rules – T. August, chair
- Assembly Committee on Rural Development – D. Armstrong, chair
- Assembly Committee on Sporting Heritage – T. E. Pronschinske, chair
- Assembly Committee on State Affairs – R. Swearingen, chair
- Assembly Committee on Tourism – G. Magnafici, chair
- Assembly Committee on Transportation – N. VanderMeer, chair
- Assembly Committee on Veterans and Military Affairs – J. Edming, chair
- Assembly Committee on Ways and Means – J. Macco, chair
- Assembly Committee on Workforce Development and Economic Opportunities – W. Petryk, chair

=== Joint committees ===
- Joint Legislative Audit Committee – E. Wimberger (Sen.) & R. Wittke (Asm.), co-chairs
- Joint Legislative Council – C. Kapenga (Sen.) & N. VanderMeer (Asm.), co-chairs
- Joint Committee for Review of Administrative Rules – S. L. Nass (Sen.) & A. Neylon (Asm.), co-chairs
- Joint Committee on Employment Relations – C. Kapenga (Sen.) & R. Vos (Asm.), co-chairs
- Joint Committee on Finance – H. Marklein (Sen.) & M. Born (Asm.), co-chairs
- Joint Committee on Information Policy and Technology – J. Bradley (Sen.) & S. Zimmerman (Asm.), co-chairs
- Joint Committee on Legislative Organization – C. Kapenga (Sen.) & R. Vos (Asm.), co-chairs
- Joint Review Committee on Criminal Penalties – R. Hutton (Sen.), chair
- Joint Survey Committee on Retirement Systems – D. Feyen (Sen.) & T. August (Asm.), co-chairs
- Joint Survey Committee on Tax Exemptions – P. Testin (Sen.) & T. August (Asm.), co-chairs

== Employees ==
=== Senate employees ===
- Chief Clerk: Michael Queensland (until Sep. 22, 2023)
  - Richard Champagne (Acting -- until January 31, 2024)
  - Linsay Hale (until December 19, 2024)
  - Richard Champagne (Acting -- from December 19, 2024)
- Sergeant at Arms: Tom Engels

=== Assembly employees ===
- Chief Clerk: Ted Blazel
- Sergeant at Arms: Anne Tonnon Byers

== See also ==
- 2020 Wisconsin elections
  - 2020 Wisconsin State Senate election
  - 2020 Wisconsin State Assembly election
- 2022 Wisconsin elections
  - 2022 Wisconsin State Senate election
  - 2022 Wisconsin State Assembly election
