= Scott Gunderson =

American politician (born 1956)

Member of the Wisconsin State Assembly from the 83rd district
- In office January 2, 1995 – January 4, 2011
- Preceded by: Kathleen A. Krosnicki
- Succeeded by: Dave Craig

Personal details
- Born: October 24, 1956 (age 69) Burlington, Wisconsin, U.S.
- Party: Republican
- Spouse: Lisa A. Nemath (m. 1981)
- Children: 3
- Occupation: Farmer, businessman

Scott Lee Gunderson (born October 24, 1956) is an American farmer, Republican politician, and former small business owner from Racine County, Wisconsin. He was a member of the Wisconsin State Assembly for 16 years, representing the 83rd Assembly district from 1995 to 2011. He left office to accept a job in the Wisconsin Department of Natural Resources. Since leaving state office, he has been active locally, running Waterford's Fourth of July and Memorial Day parades, and the Racine County Fair.

== Early life ==
Scott Gunderson was born in Burlington, Wisconsin, and raised in neighboring Waterford, Wisconsin. He graduated from Waterford Union High School in 1974. His father died in 1977. In 1980, he became the owner of a liquor and hunting supply store known as "Gundy's Liquor and Sport", in Wind Lake, Wisconsin, which he operated until 2007. During that time, he also became the operator of the Gunderson family farm in the town of Norway, and became active in many farm-related civic organizations, such as the Racine County Farm Bureau and the Racine County Fair.

== Political career ==
In April 1991, Gunderson first entered public office when he was elected to the board of supervisors of the town of Waterford. He was re-elected in 1993.

In 1994, first-term state representative Kathleen A. Krosnicki announced she would not run for re-election. Gunderson became one of four candidates seeking the Republican Party nomination to succeed her that fall. He prevailed with 40% of the vote in the Republican primary, likely assisted by increased turnout for a school referendum in Waterford at the same election. In the general election, he defeated Democrat Thomas Schilling with 62% of the vote. He went on to win re-election eight times.

In his time in the Assembly, he was a member of the committee on natural resources for all 16 years of his legislative career, serving as chairman during the 2005–2006 term. He was also chairman of the committee on urban and local affairs from 1997 through 2005. He was also active on the Wisconsin Coastal Management Council and the Wisconsin State Fair Park board.

In 1998, a vacancy occurred in the 28th Senate district when incumbent Lynn Adelman was appointed a United States district judge. Gunderson entered the special election to succeed him in the Wisconsin Senate, but he was defeated in the Republican primary by state representative Mary Lazich.

=== Ethics accusation ===
Gunderson has sponsored bills to lower the hunting age in Wisconsin to eight and to allow people to carry concealed handguns. In 2005, he refused to turn over a draft of concealed carry legislation on the grounds that draft bills are confidential, even though he had previously shown the draft to lobbyists for the National Rifle Association of America to solicit their feedback. The state Ethics Board ruled in 2006 that Gunderson as owner of Gundy's Sport didn't have enough of a financial interest in gun-related proposals to have a conflict. He said his store would not directly benefit from the legislation, and had sold fewer than 50 guns in the prior year.

=== Residency dispute ===
In 2006, Gunderson's Democratic opponent filed a charge that Gunderson did not live in the 83rd Assembly District, which he was elected to represent, and that he was violating election laws by voting in the village of Waterford. Gunderson acknowledged that his farm and farmhouse is in the 63rd District; but points out that he has an apartment in Waterford, which has been his official address and voting residence for some time. When his Norway farm home was redistricted out of the 83rd district, he had told the Milwaukee Journal Sentinel that he would be moving to a new home inside the district. The Racine County District Attorney refused to file charges, and Gunderson was re-elected despite the challenge.

== After elected office ==
After winning re-election in 2010, Gunderson resigned his seat before the start of the 2011 legislative term, accepting a job as an executive assistant in the Wisconsin Department of Natural Resources. He worked at the Department of Natural Resources for several years before resigning. Since then, he has been active locally, running Waterford's Fourth of July and Memorial Day parades, and the Racine County Fair.

== Personal life and family ==
Scott Gunderson was one of four children born to Dean Gunderson and his wife Julie. Dean Gunderson was a truck driver and died at the relatively young age of 40. The Gunderson family farm in the town of Norway had been established by Scott Gunderson's great-great grandfather, pioneer Gouty Gunderson, who immigrated to the United States from Norway in the 1830s. By the time of his death in 1905, Gouty Gunderson was one of the more prosperous farmers in the county, having expanded his farm to 220 acres.

Scott Gunderson married Lisa A. Nemath in 1981. They have three adult children. The Gundersons are members of the Lutheran church.

== Electoral history ==
=== Wisconsin Assembly (1994–2010) ===
Year	Election	Date	Elected				Defeated				Total	Plurality
1994	Primary	Sep. 13	Scott L. Gunderson	Republican	1,804	40.04%	Ken Bohmann	Rep.	1,347	29.90%	4,505	457
1994	Primary	Sep. 13	Scott L. Gunderson	Republican	1,804	40.04%	Michael R. Hanrahan	Rep.	1,028	22.82%	4,505	457
1994	Primary	Sep. 13	Scott L. Gunderson	Republican	1,804	40.04%	Robert A. Knackert	Rep.	326	7.24%	4,505	457
1994	General	Nov. 8	Scott L. Gunderson	Republican	11,538	62.32%	Thomas R. Schilling	Dem.	6,977	37.68%	18,515	4,561
1996	General	Nov. 5	Scott L. Gunderson (inc)	Republican	17,639	69.36%	Jeff Carew	Dem.	7,793	30.64%	25,432	9,846
1998	General	Nov. 3	Scott L. Gunderson (inc)	Republican	16,828	100.0%	--unopposed--				16,828	16,828
2000	General	Nov. 7	Scott L. Gunderson (inc)	Republican	24,329	76.08%	Daniel J. Drumel	Dem.	7,633	23.87%	31,979	16,696
2002	General	Nov. 5	Scott L. Gunderson (inc)	Republican	16,932	99.73%	--unopposed--				16,978	16,886
2004	General	Nov. 2	Scott L. Gunderson (inc)	Republican	25,972	99.68%	--unopposed--				26,055	25,889
2006	General	Nov. 7	Scott L. Gunderson (inc)	Republican	17,565	68.57%	Donald G. Herron	Dem.	8,045	31.41%	25,615	9,520
2008	General	Nov. 4	Scott L. Gunderson (inc)	Republican	24,834	72.97%	Aaron Robertson	Dem.	9,182	26.98%	34,032	15,652
2010	General	Nov. 2	Scott L. Gunderson (inc)	Republican	22,192	78.69%	Aaron Robertson	Dem.	6,003	21.28%	28,203	16,189

=== Wisconsin Senate (1998) ===
Wisconsin Senate, 28th District Special Election, 1998
Party	Candidate	Votes	%	±%
Special Republican Primary, February 17, 1998
Republican	Mary Lazich	6,090	54.35%	
Republican	Scott L. Gunderson	5,115	45.65%	
Plurality		975	8.70%	
Total votes		11,205	100.0%	

Wisconsin State Assembly
Preceded by Kathleen A. Krosnicki	Member of the Wisconsin State Assembly from the 83rd district January 2, 1995 – January 4, 2011	Succeeded by Dave Craig
