= William J. Rogers =

20th century American politician

Member of the Wisconsin State Assembly
- In office January 3, 1983 – January 7, 1985
- Preceded by: John C. Schober
- Succeeded by: David J. Lepak
- Constituency: 83rd Assembly district
- In office January 1, 1973 – January 3, 1983
- Preceded by: Position established
- Succeeded by: Betty Jo Nelsen
- Constituency: 5th Assembly district
- In office January 7, 1963 – January 1, 1973
- Preceded by: Marvin E. Babbitt
- Succeeded by: Position abolished
- Constituency: Outagamie 2nd district

Personal details
- Born: December 9, 1930 Appleton, Wisconsin, U.S.
- Died: November 8, 2005 (aged 74) Kaukauna, Wisconsin, U.S.
- Resting place: St. Mary's Cemetery, Kaukauna
- Party: Democratic

Military service
- Allegiance: United States
- Branch/service: United States Army
- Years of service: 1952–1954
- Rank: Private
- Battles/wars: Korean War

William J. Rogers (December 9, 1930 – November 8, 2005) was an American educator and Democratic politician from Kaukauna, Wisconsin. He served 22 years in the Wisconsin State Assembly, representing southeast Outagamie County.

== Biography ==
Rogers was born in Appleton, Wisconsin. During the Korean War, he served in the United States Army from 1952 to 1954. He went to the Mexico City College and then received his bachelor's degree from St. Norbert College. Rogers was a teacher. Rogers served in the Wisconsin State Assembly from 1963 to 1985. Rogers was a Democrat. He lived in Kaukauna, Wisconsin. Rogers died on November 8, 2005, at the age of 74.

Wisconsin Senate
Preceded by Marvin E. Babbitt	Member of the Wisconsin State Assembly from the Outagamie 2nd district January 7, 1963 – January 1, 1973	District abolished
District established by 1971 Wis. Act 304	Member of the Wisconsin State Assembly from the 5th district January 1, 1973 – January 3, 1983	Succeeded by Betty Jo Nelsen
Preceded by John C. Schober	Member of the Wisconsin State Assembly from the 83rd district January 3, 1983 – January 7, 1985	Succeeded by David J. Lepak
