= Nik Rettinger =

21st century American politician

Member of the Wisconsin State Assembly from the 83rd district
- In office January 3, 2023 – January 6, 2025
- Preceded by: Chuck Wichgers
- Succeeded by: Dave Maxey

Personal details
- Born: Nikolaus Peter Rettinger III; August 6, 1990 (age 35) Waukesha, Wisconsin, U.S.
- Party: Republican
- Spouse: Sidney Steinmann (m. 2020)
- Education: University of Wisconsin–Milwaukee (AAS, BA)
- Occupation: Legislative aide, politician
- Website: Campaign website

Nikolaus Peter "Nik" Rettinger III (born August 6, 1990) is an American political staffer and Republican politician from Waukesha County, Wisconsin. He served one term as a member of the Wisconsin State Assembly, representing Wisconsin's 83rd Assembly district during the 2023–2024 term. He is also vice chairman of the Young Republican National Federation.

== Biography ==
Nik Rettinger was born and raised in Waukesha County, Wisconsin, and graduated from Waukesha South High School in 2008. He was a boy scout and achieved the rank of Eagle Scout in 2008. After graduating from high school, he attended the University of Wisconsin–Milwaukee at Waukesha where he earned his associate's degree in 2011. He went on to the University of Wisconsin–Milwaukee and earned his bachelor's degree in 2014 with a double major in history and political science and government. He was active in student government on both the Waukesha and Milwaukee campuses; he was president of student government in Waukesha in 2010.

== Political career ==
Rettinger began his political activity in high school, starting a political club to get students involved in local campaigns. During his first semester at the University of Wisconsin–Waukesha, he interned with the Republican Party of Wisconsin for the 2008 election. After completing his bachelor's degree, he served an internship with United States senator Ron Johnson. He was then hired as a staffer in the Wisconsin State Assembly, working as a legislative assistant for representative David Craig and then as a research assistant for representative Jesse Kremer. In 2019, he was hired as chief of staff for state senator André Jacque.

In addition to his official duties, Rettinger has been active on the campaign and party organization side. He was elected first vice chair of the Republican Party of Waukesha County and chairman of the Republican Party of Wisconsin's 1st congressional district. He is also state chairman of the Wisconsin Young Republicans and a member of the board of the Young Republican National Federation.

In January 2022, he co-founded Campaign Tutors, a private company which sells campaign tutorials for aspiring political candidates. His partners in the project are former state representative Cody Horlacher and his wife.

The 2022 redistricting, carried out by the Wisconsin Supreme Court in April 2022, moved the district lines such that incumbent 83rd Assembly district representative Chuck Wichgers was moved into the 82nd Assembly district, creating an open seat in the 83rd district. Four days after the Wisconsin Supreme Court decision, Rettinger announced his candidacy for the 83rd Assembly district, launching with Wichgers' endorsement, as well as endorsements from his business partner representative Cody Horlacher, his state senator Julian Bradley, and former Wisconsin governor Scott Walker. He faced a relatively competitive primary, but defeated Waterford village trustee Pat Goldammer with 58% of the vote. He went on to win 78% of the general election vote in the heavily Republican district.

In 2024, after the Wisconsin Supreme Court's decision in Clarke v. Wisconsin Elections Commission, the state legislature passed and Gov. Tony Evers signed new legislative maps into law. These new maps drew some members of the legislature into the same districts, causing them to choose to either move into a new district to run there, run against each other to represent the newly-drawn district, or retire. Rettinger was paired with neighboring representative Chuck Wichgers, and chose to retire rather than run against him.

== State Assembly ==
While in the State Assembly, Rettinger served as the Vice Chairman of the Judiciary Committee. One of his bills, which was signed into law by Gov. Evers, added catalytic converters to the list of "major parts" of an automobile under Wisconsin law, thereby making it harder for criminals to re-sell them after they have been stolen.

He also introduced a bill to set a retirement age of 75 on judges in Wisconsin. While the Constitution of Wisconsin was amended in 1977 to give the legislature the power to impose a judicial age limit, one has not yet been adopted. Rettinger's bill passed the State Assembly, but failed to gain support in the State Senate.

In response to an increase in violent incidents in Milwaukee Public Schools, Rettinger introduced a bill that would mandate schools with more than 100 crimes reported in a single semester hire a law enforcement officer to be stationed in their building. The bill passed the State Assembly, but failed to gain support in the State Senate.

After the United States Supreme Court's ruling in Students for Fair Admissions v. Harvard, Rettinger co-sponsored a bill with State Senator Eric Wimberger which would have required scholarship programs for students in UW schools to be open to students of all races. Rettinger stated that the purpose of this bill was to "be sure that (low-income students) have just as much opportunity to attend college as any other student."

== Personal life ==
Nik Rettinger is married to school teacher Sidney Steinmann. They reside in the village of Mukwonago, Wisconsin.

== Electoral history ==
=== Wisconsin Assembly (2022) ===
Wisconsin Assembly, 83rd District Election, 2022
Party	Candidate	Votes	%	±%
Republican Primary, August 9, 2022
Republican	Nik Rettinger	6,645	57.91%	
Republican	Pat Goldammer	4,810	41.92%	
	Scattering	20	0.17%	
Plurality		1,835	15.99%	
Total votes		11,475	100.0%	
General Election, November 8, 2022
Republican	Nik Rettinger	24,153	78.60%	+8.96%
Democratic	Chaz Self	6,410	20.86%	−9.42%
	Scattering	167	0.54%	
Plurality		17,743	57.74%	+18.38%
Total votes		30,730	100.0%	-20.80%
Republican hold				

Wisconsin State Assembly
Preceded by Chuck Wichgers	Member of the Wisconsin State Assembly from the 83rd district January 3, 2023 – January 6, 2025	Succeeded by Dave Maxey
