= Krosnick =

Krosnick is a surname, occurring mainly in the United States. Notable people with the surname include:

- Joel Krosnick (1941–2025), American cellist
- Jon Krosnick, American political scientist, and social and political psychologist

== See also ==
- Kathleen A. Krosnicki (born 1950), American politician in Wisconsin
