= 2014 Wisconsin elections =

- April 1, 2014; November 4, 2014

The 2014 Wisconsin Fall General Election was held in the U.S. state of Wisconsin on November 4, 2014. Wisconsin's governor, lieutenant governor, attorney general, secretary of state, and state treasurer were all up for election, as well as Wisconsin's eight seats in the United States House of Representatives. The November general election in 2014 also featured a statewide referendum on an amendment to the Constitution of Wisconsin. The 2014 Wisconsin Fall Primary Election was held on August 12, 2014.

The Republican Party of Wisconsin held onto all statewide offices up for election in 2014, except for secretary of state, where Democrat Doug La Follette won his tenth term. Republicans also retained control of the Wisconsin State Senate and Wisconsin State Assembly. The partisan breakdown of Wisconsin's delegation to the United States House of Representatives was unchanged, remaining five Republicans and three Democrats.

For local offices and judicial seats, the 2014 Wisconsin Spring General Election was held April 1, 2014. No Wisconsin Supreme Court seats were up in 2014, but three seats on the Wisconsin Court of Appeals and 41 Wisconsin Circuit Court seats were up. The 2014 Wisconsin Spring Primary Election was held on February 18.

== Federal ==
=== House of Representatives ===
All 8 of Wisconsin's congressional districts were up for election at the Fall general election. Seven of eight incumbent representatives ran for reelection, with Tom Petri retiring from District 6. Party composition remained unchanged after the general election.

District	Incumbent	Elected	Defeated	Democratic		Republican		Others		Total		Result
District	Incumbent	Elected	Defeated	Votes	%	Votes	%	Votes	%	Votes	%	Result
District 1	Paul Ryan	Paul Ryan	Rob Zerban (D); Keith R. Deschler (Ind)	105,552	36.63%	182,316	63.27%	302	0.10%	288,170	12.23%	Republican Hold
District 2	Mark Pocan	Mark Pocan	Peter Theron (R)	224,920	68.40%	103,619	31.51%	308	0.09%	328,847	13.96%	Democratic Hold
District 3	Ron Kind	Ron Kind	Tony Kurtz (R); Ken Van Doren (Ind)	155,368	56.46%	119,540	43.44%	253	0.09%	275,161	11.68%	Democratic Hold
District 4	Gwen Moore	Gwen Moore	Dan Sebring (R); Robert R. Raymond (Ind)	179,045	70.24%	68,490	26.87%	7,357	2.89%	254,892	10.82%	Democratic Hold
District 5	Jim Sensenbrenner	Jim Sensenbrenner	Chris Rockwood (D)	101,190	30.40%	231,160	69.45%	476	0.14%	332,826	14.13%	Republican Hold
District 6	Tom Petri	Glenn Grothman	Mark L. Harris (D); Gus Fahrendorf (Ind)	122,212	40.87%	169,767	56.77%	7,054	2.36%	299,033	12.69%	Republican Hold
District 7	Sean Duffy	Sean Duffy	Kelly Westlund (D); Lawrence Dale (Ind)	112,949	39.41%	169,891	59.28%	3,763	1.31%	286,603	12.17%	Republican Hold
District 8	Reid Ribble	Reid Ribble	Ron Gruett (D)	101,345	34.94%	188,553	65.01%	150	0.05%	290,048	12.31%	Republican Hold
Total				1,102,581	46.81%	1,233,336	52.36%	19,663	0.83%	2,355,580	100.00%	

== State ==
=== Executive ===
==== Governor and Lieutenant Governor ====
Incumbent Republican Governor Scott Walker and Lieutenant Governor Rebecca Kleefisch, first elected in 2010, sought re-election to a second term after surviving a recall election in 2012.

The Democratic Party nominated business executive Mary Burke and state senator John Lehman for governor and lieutenant governor, respectively. Burke was a member of the Madison school board and former Secretary of Wisconsin's Department of Commerce. Lehman was a state senator and former teacher from Racine, who had just won back his senate seat in a recall election.

Walker and Kleefisch won the November election with 52% of the vote.

2014 Wisconsin gubernatorial election
Party	Candidate	Votes	%	±%
Republican	Scott Walker (incumbent) / Rebecca Kleefisch (incumbent)	1,259,706	52.26%	−0.79%
Democratic	Mary Burke / John Lehman	1,122,913	46.59%	+0.31%
Libertarian	Robert Burke / Joseph M. Brost	18,720	0.78%	
Independent	Dennis Fehr	7,530	0.31%	
	Scattering	1,445	0.06%	
Plurality		136,793	5.68%	
Total votes		2,410,314	100.0%	-4.20%

==== Attorney General ====
Republican incumbent attorney general J. B. Van Hollen, first elected in 2006, did not seek re-election to a third term. Waukesha County District Attorney Brad Schimel defeated Jefferson County District Attorney Susan Happ in the November general election.

Happ defeated state representative Jon Richards and Dane County District Attorney Ismael Ozanne in the Democratic primary.

==== Secretary of State ====
Incumbent Democratic secretary of state Doug La Follette, first elected in 1974 and regaining his seat in 1982, narrowly won his 10th four-year term, defeating the Republican candidate, telecommunications manager Julian Bradley.

La Follette was unopposed in the Democratic primary.

In the Republican primary, Bradley defeated State Representative Garey Bies.

==== Treasurer ====
Incumbent Republican Treasurer Kurt W. Schuller, first elected in 210 declined to run for re-election. In the election, Republican nominee Matt Adamczyk defeated Democratic nominee Dave Sartori, a former Greenfield alderman to succeed Schuller.

Adamczyk defeated attorney Randall Melchert in the Republican primary.

Sartori defeated Dave Leeper, a former Green County District Attorney, in the Democratic primary.

=== Legislature ===
==== State Senate ====
17 of the Wisconsin State Senate's 33 seats were up for election in the November general election. Republicans added one seat to their majority, retaking the 21st senate district which had been lost in the 2012 recall elections.

Seats		Party (majority caucus shading)		Total
Seats		Democratic	Republican	Total
Last election (2012)		8	8	16
Total after last election (2012)		15	18	33
Total before this election		15	17	32
Up for election		7	10	17
of which:	Incumbent retiring	3	3	6
of which:	Vacated	0	1	1
of which:	Unopposed	2	0	2
This election		6	11	17
Change from last election		▼1	▲1	
Total after this election		14	19	33
Change in total		▼1	▲2	

==== State Assembly ====
All 99 seats of the Wisconsin State Assembly were up for election in November. 21 Assembly incumbents (14 Republicans, 7 Democrats) did not seek re-election.

Affiliation	Party (Shading indicates majority caucus)		Total	
Affiliation	Republican	Democratic	Total	Vacant
Before 2014 elections	60	39	99	0
Latest voting share	61%	39%		
After 2014 elections	63	36	99	0
Voting share	64%	36%		

=== Judiciary ===
==== State Court of Appeals ====
Three seats on the Wisconsin Court of Appeals were up for election in 2014. None of the three elections was contested.

- In District I, Judge Patricia S. Curley was re-elected to her fourth term.
- In District II, Judge Lisa Neubauer was re-elected to her second full term.
- In District IV, Judge Gary Sherman was elected to his first full term. Judge Sherman had been appointed to the court in 2010 by Governor Jim Doyle.

==== State Circuit Courts ====
Forty one of the state's 249 circuit court seats were up for election in 2014. Four of those elections were contested.

=== Constitutional Amendments ===
==== Transportation Fund ====
In the November election, Wisconsin voters overwhelmingly approved an amendment to the Constitution of Wisconsin to establish a dedicated transportation fund administered by the Wisconsin Department of Transportation. The amendment also specified that none of the money which flowed into the fund, collected by transportation fees or taxes, could be appropriated to any other program. Critics argued that purpose of the amendment was to create budget inflexibility that would force legislators to raid education funds to balance the budget.

Transportation Fund
Candidate	Votes	%
Yes	1,733,101	79.94
No	434,806	20.06
Total votes	2,167,907	100

==== Personhood Amendment ====
There was an attempt to amend the Constitution of Wisconsin to establish a right to life. This amendment did not ultimately make it onto the ballot in 2014, as it did not obtain a necessary vote in the 101st Wisconsin Legislature.

== Local offices ==
=== Kenosha County ===
==== Kenosha County executive ====
A regularly scheduled county executive election was held in Kenosha County, at the Spring general election, April 1, 2014. The incumbent James Kreuser, first elected in a 2008 special election, was elected to a second four-year term without opposition.

=== Portage County ===
==== Portage County executive ====
A regularly scheduled county executive election was held in Portage County, at the Spring general election, April 1, 2014. The incumbent Patty Dreier, first elected in 2010, was elected to a second four-year term without opposition.

=== Winnebago County ===
==== Neenah mayor ====
A regularly scheduled mayoral election was held in Neenah, Wisconsin, at the Spring general election, April 1, 2014. State representative Dean Kaufert defeated incumbent mayor George Scherck.

=== Wood County ===
==== Wisconsin Rapids mayor ====
A regularly scheduled mayoral election was held in Wisconsin Rapids, Wisconsin, at the Spring general election, April 1, 2014. First-term incumbent mayor Zach Vruwink was re-elected to a second two-year term, defeating former mayor Mary Jo Carson.
