= Julian Bradley (politician) =

21st century American politician

Member of the Wisconsin Senate from the 28th district
- Incumbent
- Assumed office January 4, 2021
- Preceded by: Dave Craig

Personal details
- Born: Marc Julian Bradley; February 11, 1981 (age 45) Baltimore, Maryland, U.S.
- Party: Republican
- Education: Temple University (attended); University of Wisconsin, La Crosse (BS)
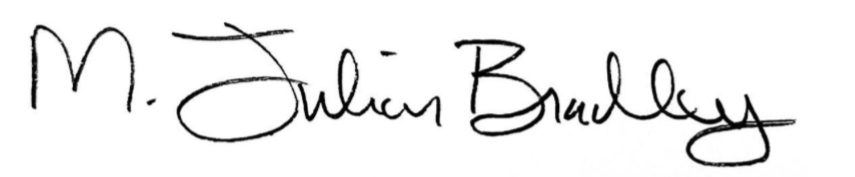
- Signature
- Website: (Campaign website; State Senate website

Marc Julian Bradley (born February 11, 1981) is an American businessman and Republican politician from Milwaukee County, Wisconsin. He is a member of the Wisconsin Senate, representing the 28th Senate district since 2021, and has been elected to serve as Senate minority leader in the 108th Wisconsin Legislature (2027–2028). He is the first black Republican to serve in the Wisconsin Senate and only the second black Republican to serve in the Wisconsin Legislature.

== Early life and career ==
Julian Bradley was born in Baltimore, Maryland, and moved with his mother to La Crosse, Wisconsin, in 1992, when he was 11 years old. He was interested in politics from an early age. Upon graduating from La Crosse Central High School in 1999, with his mother in failing health and finding himself unable to afford college, he leaned on his other childhood passion—for professional wrestling—and enrolled in "wrestling school" in Philadelphia, intending to earn money to support his family. He made his professional wrestling debut August 28, 1999, under the pseudonym Kris Krude.

After several years living in Philadelphia he entered Temple University, but only remained in school for one year. In 2007 he left professional wrestling behind and returned to Wisconsin to complete his bachelor's degree at the University of Wisconsin–La Crosse. While attending UW–La Crosse, he began working as an area repair supervisor for telecommunications company CenturyLink. He graduated with a degree in political science and economics in 2014 and worked his way up to manager at CenturyLink by 2017. In 2019 he was hired as a manager at Northwestern Mutual, requiring him to relocate to Franklin, Wisconsin, in Milwaukee County.

== Political career ==
In 2002, after a conversation with his mother over the subject of abortion, Bradley came to the conclusion that he was a Republican. His campaign website and press releases acknowledged this as a pivotal moment in his life.

He made his first attempt at elected office in 2010 when he ran for Wisconsin State Assembly in the 95th assembly district, but was defeated in the Republican primary. Despite his primary defeat, he continued working as an organizer and volunteer with the Republican Party of Wisconsin through the general election and became acquainted with Bill Feehan. Feehan planned to seek election as chairman of the La Crosse County Republican Party in 2011 and asked Bradley to join his ticket as vice chair. Bradley agreed and they were elected together. Less than a year later, Feehan stepped down to run for State Senate and Bradley was chosen as his successor. Bradley was chairman of the La Crosse County Republican Party from 2011 through 2014, when he stepped down to make another attempt at elected office. In 2013, he was elected vice chair of the state Republican Party for the 3rd congressional district and was ex officio a member of the state party's executive committee. Also in 2013, he was named Charlie Sykes's Right Wisconsin grassroots activist of the year.

In 2014 he made another run for elected office when he launched a challenge against 32-year incumbent Wisconsin Secretary of State Doug La Follette. This time he prevailed in the Republican primary, but he fell 86,000 votes short of Doug La Follette in the general election in a year when Republicans won every other statewide office.

Following his move to Franklin in 2019, Bradley resumed his political activities and, in 2020, he announced he would be a candidate to replace State Senator Dave Craig, who was not seeking re-election. Four other candidates ultimately also joined the Republican primary contest for the safely-Republican senate seat, but Bradley distinguished himself with strong endorsements from established Republicans in the state party, including two of the three assemblymembers whose districts were contained within the boundaries of the 28th senate district—Ken Skowronski and Chuck Wichgers—as well as former Republican governor Scott Walker. Bradley prevailed with 40% of the vote in the crowded five-person Republican primary. He went on to defeat Democrat Adam Murphy in the general election, taking nearly 60% of the vote.

The 2024 redistricting act drew Bradley out of the 28th Senate district, but Bradley has signaled that he intends to relocate in order to maintain residency and run for re-election in 2024.

== Controversies ==
In July 2020, while running in the Republican primary for Wisconsin State Senate, the conservative opinion newspaper RightWisconsin alleged that Bradley and his campaign lied when he said that the online publication refused to publish an op-ed that he had submitted. Rather, the newspaper stated, they had suggested corrections to the Bradley op-ed, as they do with every op-ed that they publish. The original Bradley article made claims and assertions such as:

"It's no coincidence that Planned Parenthood surgical clinics continue to be located primarily in overwhelmingly black neighborhoods."
"Sincere black lives matter allies should eliminate the Sanger shrine to racism embodied in every Planned Parenthood today."

When RightWisconsin offered corrections and substitutions for these largely speculative and unfounded claims and assertions, the Bradley campaign rejected the newspaper's suggestions, later falsely claiming that RightWisconsin rejected the op-ed outright.

== Personal life and family ==
Julian Bradley is the youngest of three children. He lives in New Berlin, Wisconsin.

== Electoral history ==
=== Wisconsin Assembly (2010) ===
Wisconsin Assembly, 95th District Election, 2010
Party	Candidate	Votes	%	±%
Republican Primary, September 14, 2010
Republican	Nick Charles	1,431	54.14%	
Republican	Julian Bradley	1,209	45.74%	
	Scattering	3	0.11%	
Plurality		222	8.40%	
Total votes		2,643	100.0%	

=== Wisconsin Secretary of State (2014) ===
Wisconsin Secretary of State Election, 2014
Party	Candidate	Votes	%	±%
Republican Primary, August 12, 2014
Republican	Julian Bradley	138,569	64.68%	
Republican	Garey Bies	75,379	35.18%	
	Scattering	301	0.14%	
Plurality		63,190	29.49%	
Total votes		214,249	100.0%	
General Election, November 4, 2014
Democratic	Doug La Follette (incumbent)	1,161,113	50.00%	−1.61%
Republican	Julian Bradley	1,074,835	46.29%	−2.01%
Independent	Andy Craig	58,996	2.54%	
Constitution	Jerry Broitzman	25,744	1.11%	
	Scattering	1,347	0.06%	
Plurality		86,278	3.72%	+0.40%
Total votes		2,322,035	100.0%	+11.57%
Democratic hold				

=== Wisconsin Senate (2020, 2024) ===
Wisconsin Senate, 28th District Election, 2020
Party	Candidate	Votes	%	±%
Republican Primary, August 11, 2020
Republican	Julian Bradley	8,263	40.69%	
Republican	Steve Bobowski	4,692	23.10%	
Republican	Dan Griffin	4,177	20.57%	
Republican	Marina Croft	1,623	7.99%	
Republican	Jim Engstrand	1,543	7.60%	
	Scattering	11	0.05%	
Plurality		3,571	17.58%	
Total votes		20,309	100.0%	
General Election, November 3, 2020
Republican	Julian Bradley	64,179	59.62%	−38.48%
Democratic	Adam Murphy	43,391	40.31%	
	Scattering	80	0.07%	
Plurality		20,788	19.31%	-76.89%
Total votes		107,650	100.0%	+50.28%
Republican hold				

Party political offices
Preceded by David King	Republican nominee for Secretary of State of Wisconsin; 2014	Succeeded by Jay Schroeder
