= Marvin E. Babbitt =

American politician (1902–1981)

Marvin E. Babbitt (August 14, 1902 – March 2, 1981) was an American politician from Wisconsin, who served as a Republican member of the Wisconsin State Assembly.

== Biography ==
Babbitt was born on August 14, 1902, in Seymour, Wisconsin. He later served in the United States Army and became president of the local Kiwanis chapter. Babbitt died March 2, 1981, in Rice County, Minnesota and is buried at Seymour Cemetery in Seymour, Wisconsin.

== Political career ==
Babbitt was elected to the Wisconsin State Assembly in 1960. Additionally, he was a member of the county board.
