= Mary Lazich =

American politician

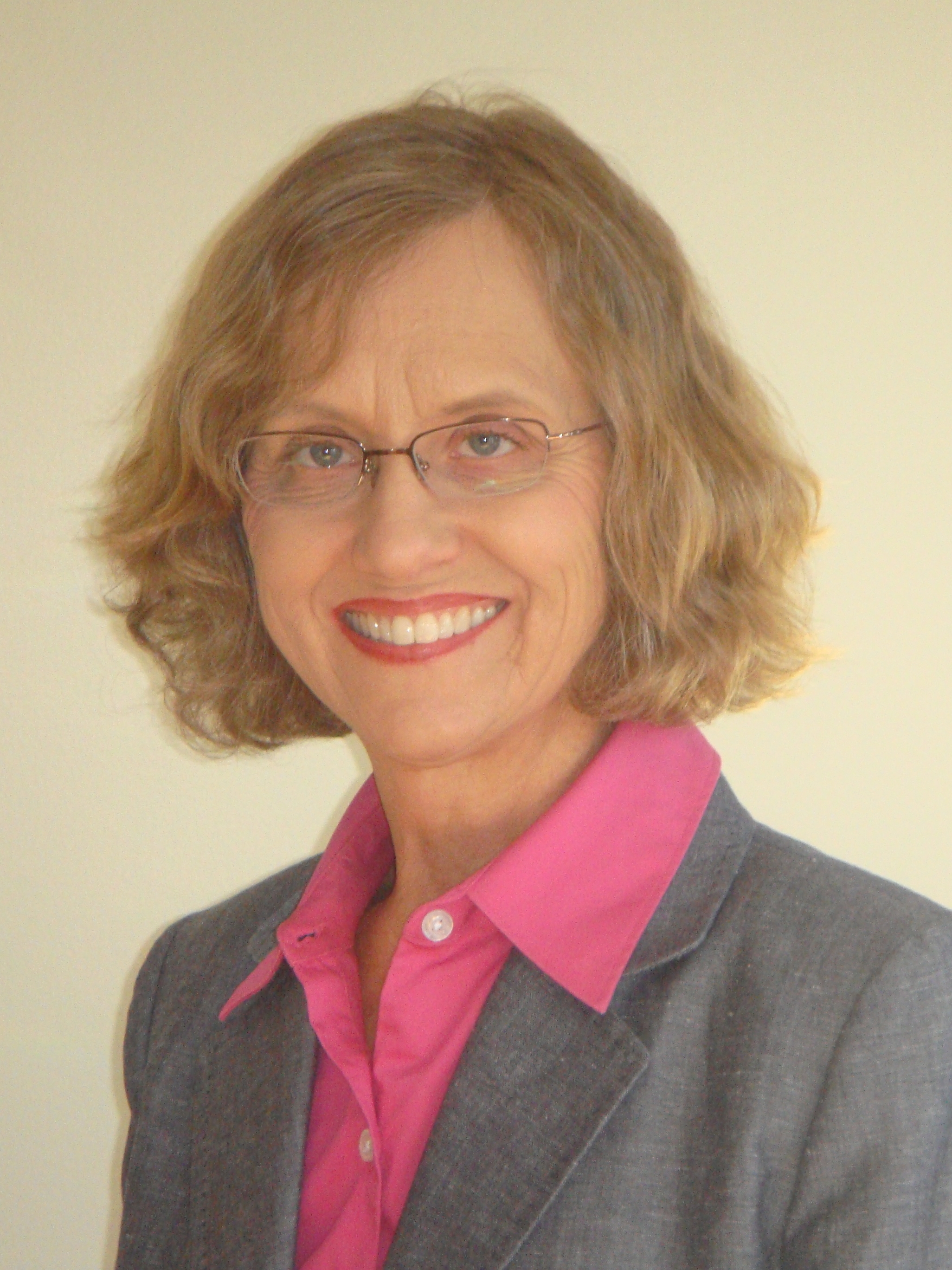
- Lazich in 2009

President of the Wisconsin Senate
- In office January 5, 2015 – January 3, 2017
- Preceded by: Michael Ellis
- Succeeded by: Roger Roth

Member of the Wisconsin Senate from the 28th district
- In office April 20, 1998 – January 2, 2017
- Preceded by: Lynn Adelman
- Succeeded by: Dave Craig

Member of the Wisconsin State Assembly from the 84th district
- In office January 4, 1993 – April 20, 1998
- Preceded by: Marc C. Duff
- Succeeded by: Mark Gundrum

Personal details
- Born: October 3, 1952 (age 74) Loyal, Wisconsin, U.S.
- Party: Republican
- Education: University of Wisconsin–Milwaukee

Mary Lazich (born October 3, 1952) is an American Republican politician. She served five years in the Wisconsin State Assembly and 19 years in the State Senate, and was President of the Senate for her final session (2015–2016).

== Early life ==
Born in Loyal, Wisconsin, she graduated from Loyal High School and went on to earn her bachelor's degree from the University of Wisconsin–Milwaukee, graduating summa cum laude. She was a New Berlin city councilmember from 1986 through 1992, and a Waukesha County supervisor from 1990 through 1993.

== Legislative career ==
In the Senate, Lazich represented the 28th District since winning a special election in April 1998. She was elected as president of the Wisconsin Senate in January 2015, the first female ever elected to that position. She was previously a member of the Wisconsin Assembly from 1992 through 1998.

In 2004, Lazich was criticized for lying about her vote for Senate Majority Leader.

On March 21, 2016, Lazich announced that she would not run for re-election in 2016.

== 2011 recall attempt ==
Senator Lazich was one of several Wisconsin state senators who faced a recall campaign in 2011 and 2012 due to her support for Governor Scott Walker's "budget repair bill", which removed collective bargaining rights from public employees. However, the recall attempt failed to get enough signatures to be put on the ballot.

== Electoral history ==
Wisconsin State Senate District 28 election, 2000
| Party | Candidate | Votes | % | ±% |
|---|---|---|---|---|
| Republican | Mary Lazich | 61,366 | 67.48% | |
| Democratic | Kathleen S. Arciszewski | 29,519 | 32.46% | |
| | Scattering | 60 | .06% | |

Wisconsin State Senate District 28 election, 2004
| Party | Candidate | Votes | % | ±% |
|---|---|---|---|---|
| Republican | Mary Lazich | 73,899 | 99.27% | |
| | Scattering | 544 | .73% | |

Wisconsin State Senate District 28 election, 2008
| Party | Candidate | Votes | % | ±% |
|---|---|---|---|---|
| Republican | Mary Lazich | 74,951 | 99.24% | |
| | Scattering | 571 | .76% | |

Wisconsin State Senate District 28 election, 2012
| Party | Candidate | Votes | % | ±% |
|---|---|---|---|---|
| Republican | Mary Lazich | 60,854 | 63.4% | |
| Democratic | Jim Ward | 35,053 | 36.5% | |
| | Scattering | 103 | .1% | |

Wisconsin State Assembly
| Preceded by Marc C. Duff | Member of the Wisconsin State Assembly from the 84th district January 4, 1993 – April 20, 1998 | Succeeded by Mark Gundrum |
Wisconsin Senate
| Preceded by Lynn Adelman | Member of the Wisconsin Senate from the 28th district April 20, 1998 – January 2, 2017 | Succeeded by Dave Craig |
| Preceded by Michael Ellis | President of the Wisconsin Senate; January 5, 2015 – January 3, 2017 | Succeeded by Roger Roth |
