= Dave Maxey =

21st century American politician

Member of the Wisconsin State Assembly
- Incumbent
- Assumed office January 6, 2025
- Preceded by: Nik Rettinger
- Constituency: 83rd Assembly district
- In office January 3, 2023 – January 6, 2025
- Preceded by: Joe Sanfelippo
- Succeeded by: Adam Neylon
- Constituency: 15th Assembly district

Member of the Common Council of New Berlin, Wisconsin
- Incumbent
- Assumed office April 2019

Personal details
- Born: January 15, 1973 (age 53) Oconomowoc, Wisconsin, U.S.
- Party: Republican
- Education: Waukesha County Technical College (AA)
- Website: Campaign website

Military service
- Allegiance: United States
- Branch/service: United States Navy
- Unit: USS Leftwich

Dave G. Maxey (born January 15, 1973) is an American marketing professional and Republican politician from Waukesha County, Wisconsin. He is a member of the Wisconsin State Assembly, representing Wisconsin's 83rd Assembly district since 2025; he previously represented the 15th Assembly district during the 2023–2024 term. He is also a member of the Common Council of New Berlin since 2019.

== Biography ==
Dave Maxey was born in Wisconsin and graduated from Brookfield East High School in 1991 and enlisted in the United States Navy. After his term of enlistment, he attended Waukesha County Technical College and earned an associate degree in marketing.

== Political career ==
In 2003, he moved to New Berlin, Wisconsin, where he has since resided. In 2008, he ran for and was elected to the New Berlin Board of Education. He served nine years on the board, including six as president. He was subsequently elected to the New Berlin city council in 2017.

In April 2022, incumbent Wisconsin state representative Joe Sanfelippo announced he would not seek another term and would retire at the end of the 105th Wisconsin Legislature. That same day, Maxey announced his candidacy for the 15th Assembly district seat. After his prompt announcement, no other candidate chose to enter the race and Maxey faced no opponent in the primary or general election in 2022. He took office in January 2023.

In 2024, following redistricting, Maxey was elected in the new 83rd district.

== Personal life and family ==
Dave Maxey lives with his wife, Tracy, and their three children in New Berlin, Wisconsin.

== Electoral history ==
=== Wisconsin Assembly, 15th district (2022) ===
| Year | Election | Date | Elected | | | | Defeated | Total | Plurality |
|---|---|---|---|---|---|---|---|---|---|
| 2022 | General | Nov. 8 | Dave Maxey | Republican | 21,582 | 95.81% | --Unopposed-- | 22,526 | 20,630 |

=== Wisconsin Assembly, 83rd district (2024) ===
| Year | Election | Date | Elected | | | | Defeated | | | | Total | Plurality |
|---|---|---|---|---|---|---|---|---|---|---|---|---|
| 2024 | General | Nov. 5 | Dave Maxey | Republican | 23,772 | 60.92% | Jill Schindler | Dem. | 15,194 | 38.94% | 40,628 | 6,552 |

Wisconsin State Assembly
| Preceded by Joe Sanfelippo | Member of the Wisconsin State Assembly from the 15th district January 3, 2023 – January 6, 2025 | Succeeded by Adam Neylon |
| Preceded by Nik Rettinger | Member of the Wisconsin State Assembly from the 83rd district January 6, 2025 – present | Incumbent |
