= Tip McGuire =

American attorney and politician (born 1987)

Member of the Wisconsin State Assembly from the 64th district
- Incumbent
- Assumed office May 13, 2019
- Preceded by: Peter Barca

Personal details
- Born: Thaddeus McGuire; July 1987 (age 38–39) Somers, Wisconsin, U.S.
- Party: Democratic
- Education: Marquette University (BA); University of Wisconsin, Madison (JD)
- Website: State Assembly website; Campaign website

Thaddeus P. "Tip" McGuire (born July 1987) is an American attorney and Democratic politician from Kenosha County, Wisconsin. He is a member of the Wisconsin State Assembly, representing the 64th Assembly district since May 2019. He previously served as an assistant district attorney in Milwaukee County.

== Biography ==
Tip McGuire was born in Somers, Wisconsin, in July 1987. He was raised and educated in southeast Wisconsin, graduating from St. Catherine's High School in Racine, Wisconsin, in 2005. He went on to attend Marquette University where he earned his bachelor's degree in 2009.

He got involved in politics shortly after graduation, working as a legislative aide to state representative Peter Barca from 2009 through 2014, and as a campaign field organizer for the Democratic Party of Wisconsin in the 2010 and 2012 elections. He went to law school in 2014, and ultimately earned his J.D. from the University of Wisconsin Law School in 2017.

After graduating from law school, McGuire was hired as a prosecutor in the office of the Kenosha County district attorney, and, in 2018, was hired as an assistant district attorney in Milwaukee County.

After the 2018 gubernatorial election, incoming governor Tony Evers nominated McGuire's former boss, Peter Barca, to serve as secretary of the Wisconsin Department of Revenue. Barca's elevation created a vacancy in the 64th Assembly district, and, on January 22, 2019, McGuire announced that he would run for the open seat.

McGuire defeated Gina Walkington and Spencer Zimmerman in the Democratic Party primary election. He defeated Republican Mark Stalker in the April 30 special election.

McGuire was sworn in on May 13, 2019, by Kenosha County circuit judge Jodi Meier. He went on to win election to a full term in 2020, and was re-elected in 2022 and 2024.

== Electoral history ==
=== Wisconsin Assembly (2019–present) ===
Year	Election	Date	Elected				Defeated				Total	Plurality
2019 special	Primary	Apr. 2	Tip McGuire	Democratic	2,433	55.02%	Gina Walkington	Dem.	1,740	39.35%	4,422	693
2019 special	Primary	Apr. 2	Tip McGuire	Democratic	2,433	55.02%	Spencer Zimmerman	Dem.	243	5.50%	4,422	693
2019 special	Special	Apr. 30	Tip McGuire	Democratic	4,096	62.35%	Mark Stalker	Rep.	2,467	37.56%	6,569	1,629
2020	General	Nov. 3	Tip McGuire (inc)	Democratic	16,364	56.00%	Ed Hibsch	Rep.	12,813	43.85%	29,219	3,551
2022	General	Nov. 8	Tip McGuire (inc)	Democratic	12,873	56.73%	Ed Hibsch	Rep.	9,799	43.19%	22,690	3,074
2024	General	Nov. 5	Tip McGuire (inc)	Democratic	15,816	55.59%	Ed Hibsch	Rep.	12,576	44.21%	28,449	3,240
