= Wisconsin's 83rd Assembly district =

American legislative district in Waukesha County, Wisconsin

Wisconsin's 83rd State Assembly district
- 2024 map defined in 2023 Wisc. Act 94; 2022 map defined in Johnson v. Wisconsin Elections Commission; 2011 map was defined in 2011 Wisc. Act 43
Assemblymember
| Dave Maxey; R–New Berlin |
since January 6, 2025 (1 year, 52 days)
- Demographics: 88.29% White; 1.4% Black; 4.62% Hispanic; 3.93% Asian; 1.21% Native American; 0.1% Hawaiian/Pacific Islander
- Population (2020) • Voting age: 59,567; 47,727
- Website: Official website
- Notes: Southeast Wisconsin

The 83rd Assembly district of Wisconsin is one of 99 districts in the Wisconsin State Assembly. Located in southeast Wisconsin, the district comprises part of eastern Waukesha County. It includes all of the city of New Berlin, most of the village of Waukesha, and part of the city of Muskego. The district is represented by Republican Dave Maxey, since January 2025; Maxey previously represented the 15th district from 2023 to 2025.

The 83rd Assembly district is located within Wisconsin's 28th Senate district, along with the 82nd and 84th Assembly districts.

== History ==
Notable former representatives of the 83rd district include John C. Shabaz, who was appointed United States district judge for the Western District of Wisconsin by President Ronald Reagan and later became chief judge of that court.

== List of past representatives ==
List of representatives to the Wisconsin State Assembly from the 83rd district
| Member | Party | Residence | Counties represented | Term start | Term end | Ref. |
|---|---|---|---|---|---|---|
District created
| John C. Shabaz | Rep. | New Berlin | Waukesha | January 1, 1973 | December 17, 1981 | |
| --Vacant-- | | | Waukesha | December 17, 1981 | April 14, 1982 | |
| John C. Schober | Rep. | Big Bend | Waukesha | April 14, 1982 | January 3, 1983 | |
| William J. Rogers | Dem. | Kaukauna | Brown, Outagamie | January 3, 1983 | January 7, 1985 | |
| David J. Lepak | Rep. | Muskego | Racine, Walworth, Waukesha | January 7, 1985 | January 7, 1991 | |
| Maxine Hough | Dem. | East Troy | Racine, Walworth, Waukesha | January 7, 1991 | January 4, 1993 | |
| Kathleen A. Krosnicki | Rep. | Waterford | Milwaukee, Racine, Walworth, Waukesha | January 4, 1993 | January 2, 1995 | |
| Scott Gunderson | Rep. | Waterford | Milwaukee, Racine, Walworth, Waukesha | January 2, 1995 | January 4, 2011 | |
| Scott Gunderson | Rep. | Waterford | Racine, Walworth, Waukesha | January 2, 1995 | January 4, 2011 | |
| --Vacant-- | | | Racine, Walworth, Waukesha | January 4, 2011 | May 17, 2011 | |
| Dave Craig | Rep. | Big Bend | Milwaukee, Racine, Walworth, Waukesha | May 17, 2011 | January 2, 2017 | |
| Chuck Wichgers | Rep. | Muskego | Milwaukee, Racine, Walworth, Waukesha | January 2, 2017 | January 2, 2023 | |
| Nik Rettinger | Rep. | Mukwonago | Racine, Walworth, Waukesha | January 3, 2023 | January 6, 2025 | |
| Dave Maxey | Rep. | New Berlin | Waukesha | January 6, 2025 | Current | |
