= David J. Lepak =

American politician

David J. Lepak is a former member of the Wisconsin State Assembly.

== Biography ==
Lepak was born on April 17, 1959, in Milwaukee, Wisconsin. He graduated from Muskego High School in Muskego, Wisconsin and Carthage College in Kenosha, Wisconsin. He also received a Masters in Business Administration from the University of Chicago, Booth School of Business. Lepak is married to Lynn Lepak and has two sons from prior marriages. He and his wife currently reside in Waukesha, Wisconsin.

== Career ==
Lepak was first elected to the Assembly in 1984 and served three terms. He is a Republican. After leaving the state legislature Lepak accepted a position in the administration of then Governor Tommy G. Thompson as executive assistant, then as director of economic development, for the Wisconsin Housing and Economic Development Authority (WHEDA) where he oversaw the state's small business loan programs. He left WHEDA to become president of the Waukesha County Economic Development Corporation before beginning a career in real estate development consulting. Lepak later served as general manager for Quality Fireplace & Chimney Service in Waukesha, Wisconsin and has been an active member of Fox River Christian Church serving on its counseling ministry, as a facilitator for DivorceCare and on the leadership team for the ReEngage marriage ministry. Lepak and his wife Lynn currently own and operate Mosquito Joe of Waukesha County, a business that "Makes Outside Fun Again" by eliminating mosquitoes from its customers yards.
