= Dave Craig =

American Republican politician

David Craig

Member of the Wisconsin Senate from the 28th district
- In office January 3, 2017 – January 4, 2021
- Preceded by: Mary Lazich
- Succeeded by: Julian Bradley

Member of the Wisconsin State Assembly from the 83rd district
- In office May 2011 – January 3, 2017
- Preceded by: Scott Gunderson
- Succeeded by: Chuck Wichgers

Personal details
- Born: March 16, 1979 (age 47) Waukesha, Wisconsin
- Party: Republican
- Children: 6
- Education: University of Wisconsin–Milwaukee (B.A)
- Profession: Politician, political aide

David Craig (born March 16, 1979) is an American Republican Party politician and former state legislator. He served four years in the Wisconsin State Senate and six years in the Wisconsin State Assembly.

== Early life and education ==
Craig was born in Waukesha on March 16, 1979. He graduated from Wisconsin Lutheran High School in 1997. He attended the University of Wisconsin-Waukesha and the University of Wisconsin–Milwaukee, earning his Bachelor of Arts from the latter in 2002.

== Political career ==
Craig worked for more than eight years as a congressional aide to U.S. Representative Paul Ryan Republican out of Ryan's Kenosha office; he was also on the Big Bend village board of trustees from 2008 to 2010.

Craig was elected to the Wisconsin State Assembly in a special election held in May 2011 to fill the seat vacated by Scott Gunderson, who had resigned to work as an executive assistant at the Wisconsin Department of Natural Resources. The district spanned parts of Waukesha, Racine, and Walworth counties. In announcing his run for office, Craig expressed strong support for Governor Scott Walker and his economic policies. Craig was endorsed by Ryan and Muskego mayor John Johnson. Craig was reelected to the Assembly in 2012 and 2014. While in the Assembly, Craig was chairs of the Assembly Committee on Financial Institutions and vice chair of the Committee on State Affairs and Government Operations.

Craig was elected to the Wisconsin State Senate in 2016, in an uncontested race. In 2017, Craig was the lone Republican senator to vote against the state budget bill, believing that the budget was too high.

Craig considered running to succeed Ryan as a member of Congress from Wisconsin's 1st congressional district in 2018, but ultimately declined to run.

== Personal life ==
Craig is married and has six children.

Wisconsin State Assembly
Preceded by Scott Gunderson	Member of the Wisconsin State Assembly from the 83rd district May 2011 – January 3, 2017	Succeeded by Chuck Wichgers
Wisconsin Senate
Preceded by Mary Lazich	Member of the Wisconsin Senate from the 28th district January 3, 2017 – January 4, 2021	Succeeded by Julian Bradley
