= Ken Skowronski =

American politician

Member of the Wisconsin State Assembly from the 82nd district
- In office January 6, 2014 – January 2, 2023
- Preceded by: Jeff Stone
- Succeeded by: Chuck Wichgers

Personal details
- Born: May 31, 1938 (age 88) Milwaukee, Wisconsin, U.S.
- Party: Republican
- Spouse: Widowed
- Children: 2
- Education: Milwaukee Area Technical College
- Profession: General contractor, politician
- Website: Official website

Military service
- Allegiance: United States
- Branch/service: Air National Guard
- Unit: 128th Air Refueling Wing

Ken Skowronski (born May 31, 1938) is an American general contractor and Republican politician from Milwaukee County, Wisconsin. He is a former member of the Wisconsin State Assembly, representing the 82nd assembly district from January 2014 through 2022.

== Biography ==
Born in Milwaukee, Skowronski graduated from Boys Tech High School in 1958 and was certified as a journeyman carpenter in 1961, after attending Milwaukee Area Technical College. He worked for 58 years in the construction and remodeling industry as a general contractor.

Skowronski served in the Wisconsin Air National Guard with the 128th Air Refueling Wing. Additionally, he is a member of the Knights of Columbus and Ducks Unlimited. He is the current President of the Polish Heritage Alliance of Wisconsin.

== Political career ==
Skowronski was elected to the Assembly in 2013 in a special election following the resignation of Jeff Stone. Previously, he was elected as an alderman of Franklin in 2005 and re-elected in 2008 and 2011.

Wisconsin State Assembly
| Preceded by Jeff Stone | Member of the Wisconsin State Assembly from the 82nd district January 2014 – January 2, 2023 | Succeeded by Chuck Wichgers |
