= Rob Summerfield =

American businessman and politician

Member of the Wisconsin State Assembly
- Incumbent
- Assumed office January 6, 2025
- Preceded by: Karen Hurd
- Constituency: 68th district
- In office January 3, 2017 – January 6, 2025
- Preceded by: Tom Larson
- Succeeded by: David Armstrong
- Constituency: 67th district

Personal details
- Born: February 24, 1980 (age 46) Bloomer, Wisconsin, U.S.
- Party: Republican
- Education: University of Wisconsin–Stout (BA)
- Profession: business owner, politician
- Website: Official website

Rob Summerfield is an American businessman and Republican politician from Chippewa County, Wisconsin. He is a member of the Wisconsin State Assembly, representing Wisconsin's 68th Assembly district since 2025; he previously represented the 67th Assembly district from 2017 to 2025.

== Biography ==
Born in Bloomer, Wisconsin, Summerfield helped run his family business the Two Acres Supper Club. He also co-owned the Chippewa Valley Land Title Company. Summerfield has served in the Wisconsin State Assembly as a Republican since 2017.

Wisconsin State Assembly
Preceded by Tom Larson	Member of the Wisconsin State Assembly from the 67th district January 3, 2017 – January 6, 2025	Succeeded by David Armstrong
Preceded by Karen Hurd	Member of the Wisconsin State Assembly from the 68th district January 6, 2025 – present	Incumbent
