= Cameron, Barron County, Wisconsin =

Cameron, Wisconsin
- Village
- Location of Cameron in Barron County, Wisconsin
- Country: United States
- State: Wisconsin
- County: Barron

Area
  - Total: 2.66 sq mi (6.90 km^{2})
  - Land: 2.62 sq mi (6.79 km^{2})
  - Water: 0.042 sq mi (0.11 km^{2})

Population (2020)
  - Total: 1,872
  - Density: 714/sq mi (275.7/km^{2})
- Time zone: UTC-6 (Central (CST))
  - Summer (DST): UTC-5 (CDT)
- Zip Code: 54822
- FIPS code: 55-12250
- GNIS feature ID: 1582910
- Website: Official website

Cameron is a village in Barron County in the U.S. state of Wisconsin. The population was 1,872 at the 2020 census, and 1,783 at the 2010 census.

== History ==
A post office called Cameron has been in operation since 1882.

The village was named for Angus Cameron, a United States Senator from Wisconsin.

== Geography ==
Cameron is located at 45°24′32″N 91°44′33″W.

According to the United States Census Bureau, the village has a total area of 2.51 square miles (6.50 km^{2}), of which 2.47 square miles (6.40 km^{2}) is land and 0.04 square miles (0.10 km^{2}) is water.

Cameron is located along U.S. Highways 8 and 53, as well as County Roads SS (1st Street) and W (Main Street).

== Demographics ==
Historical population
Census	Pop.	Note	%±
1900	394		—
1910	562		42.6%
1920	572		1.8%
1930	760		32.9%
1940	807		6.2%
1950	963		19.3%
1960	982		2.0%
1970	893		−9.1%
1980	1,115		24.9%
1990	1,273		14.2%
2000	1,546		21.4%
2010	1,783		15.3%
2020	1,872		5.0%
U.S. Decennial Census

=== 2010 census ===
As of the census of 2010, there were 1,783 people, 744 households, and 488 families living in the village. The population density was 721.9 inhabitants per square mile (278.7/km^{2}). There were 797 housing units at an average density of 322.7 per square mile (124.6/km^{2}). The racial makeup of the village was 97.0% White, 0.4% African American, 0.2% Native American, 0.5% Asian, 0.2% from other races, and 1.7% from two or more races. Hispanic or Latino people of any race were 2.0% of the population.

There were 744 households, of which 35.5% had children under the age of 18 living with them, 46.8% were married couples living together, 13.6% had a female householder with no husband present, 5.2% had a male householder with no wife present, and 34.4% were non-families. 27.0% of all households were made up of individuals, and 9.6% had someone living alone who was 65 years of age or older. The average household size was 2.40 and the average family size was 2.89.

The median age in the village was 34.5 years. 26.9% of residents were under the age of 18; 7.8% were between the ages of 18 and 24; 28.6% were from 25 to 44; 23.7% were from 45 to 64; and 13.1% were 65 years of age or older. The gender makeup of the village was 48.9% male and 51.1% female.

=== 2000 census ===
As of the census of 2000, there were 1,546 people, 640 households, and 414 families living in the village. The population density was 641.3 people per square mile (247.7/km^{2}). There were 661 housing units at an average density of 274.2/sq mi (105.9/km^{2}). The racial makeup of the village was 97.74% White, 0.84% Native American, 0.19% Asian, 0.32% from other races, and 0.91% from two or more races. Hispanic or Latino people of any race were 1.81% of the population.

There were 640 households, out of which 33.9% had children under the age of 18 living with them, 50.6% were married couples living together, 9.1% had a female householder with no husband present, and 35.2% were non-families. 28.3% of all households were made up of individuals, and 13.3% had someone living alone who was 65 years of age or older. The average household size was 2.41 and the average family size was 2.94.

In the village, the population was spread out, with 25.9% under the age of 18, 9.5% from 18 to 24, 29.4% from 25 to 44, 20.8% from 45 to 64, and 14.3% who were 65 years of age or older. The median age was 36 years. For every 100 females, there were 96.4 males. For every 100 females age 18 and over, there were 92.1 males.

The median income for a household in the village was $34,167, and the median income for a family was $40,625. Males had a median income of $30,069 versus $20,885 for females. The per capita income for the village was $16,470. About 8.4% of families and 10.3% of the population were below the poverty line, including 10.1% of those under age 18 and 16.3% of those age 65 or over.
