= Chuck Wichgers =

American politician (born 1965)

Member of the Wisconsin State Assembly
- Incumbent
- Assumed office January 6, 2025
- Preceded by: Bob Donovan
- Constituency: 84th district
- In office January 3, 2023 – January 6, 2025
- Preceded by: Ken Skowronski
- Succeeded by: Scott Allen
- Constituency: 82nd district
- In office January 2, 2017 – January 2, 2023
- Preceded by: David Craig
- Succeeded by: Nik Rettinger
- Constituency: 83rd district

Personal details
- Born: July 4, 1965 (age 61) Milwaukee, Wisconsin, U.S.
- Party: Republican
- Spouse: Michelle (Hocking) Wichgers
- Education: Waukesha County Technical College
- Profession: Medical sales, politician
- Website: Official website

Chuck Wichgers (born July 4, 1965) is an American businessman and Republican politician from Waukesha County, Wisconsin. He is a member of the Wisconsin State Assembly, representing Wisconsin's 84th Assembly district since 2025; he previously represented the 82nd Assembly district during the 2023–2024 term, and represented the 83rd Assembly district from 2017 to 2023.

== Early life and education ==
Wichgers was born in Milwaukee, Wisconsin. He graduated from Muskego High School in 1983 and attended Waukesha County Technical College 1984–1985.

== Political career ==
Wichgers was a Waukesha County supervisor and alderman of Muskego (1999–2002). He was first elected to the Wisconsin State Assembly in 2016, from District 83.

In 2017, he sponsored a bill that would allow chiropractors to give physicals to student athletes. (Under current Wisconsin law, only physicians and physician assistants may do so.) In 2021, he sponsored legislation to prohibit public schools from teaching students and employees about concepts such as systemic racism and implicit bias; the bill passed an Assembly committee on a party-line vote.

In March 2020, Wichgers opposed a Wisconsin Department of Health Services rule that required seventh-grade students to get the meningitis vaccine, a key protection against bacterial meningitis. The proposal to oppose the changes was adopted on party lines in a committee vote. October 2020, amid a surge of COVID-19 cases in Wisconsin, Wichgers was one of several Wisconsin Republican legislators who attended an gathering hosted by an anti-abortion organization. In August 2021, Wichgers delivered a speech to protestors at the Wisconsin State Capitol, at which demonstrators likened COVID-19 vaccines to genocide and tyranny.

After Joe Biden defeated Donald Trump in the 2020 presidential election, Wichgers was one of 15 Wisconsin Republican legislators (joined by 76 Republican state legislators from other states) who attempted to subvert the election result and block Biden's victory. On January 5, 2021—one day before a violent pro-Trump mob attacked the Capitol—Wichgers signed a letter asking Vice President Mike Pence to delay the legally-mandated counting of the electoral votes for 10 days while they worked to convince Republican-controlled state legislators in key states won by Biden to overturn the election results, keeping Trump in power for another term. On July 25, 2022, Wichgers joined fellow Wisconsin Rep. Tim Ramthun's effort to pass a bill that would have the state legislature decertify its results from the 2020 presidential election and recall Wisconsin's 10 electoral votes, which went to Joe Biden.

== Electoral history ==
=== Wisconsin Assembly, 83rd district (2016–2020) ===
Year	Election	Date	Elected				Defeated				Total	Plurality
2016	Primary	Aug. 9	Chuck Wichgers	Republican	4,077	48.58%	Steven A. Whittow	Rep.	2,817	33.57%	8,392	1,260
2016	Primary	Aug. 9	Chuck Wichgers	Republican	4,077	48.58%	Karen L. Schuh	Rep.	915	10.90%	8,392	1,260
2016	Primary	Aug. 9	Chuck Wichgers	Republican	4,077	48.58%	Jordan Karweik	Rep.	576	6.86%	8,392	1,260
2016	General	Nov. 8	Chuck Wichgers	Republican	26,596	98.79%	--unopposed--				26,923	26,269
2018	General	Nov. 6	Chuck Wichgers (inc)	Republican	22,351	69.85%	Jim Brownlow	Dem.	9,624	30.08%	31,998	12,727
2020	General	Nov. 3	Chuck Wichgers (inc)	Republican	27,019	69.63%	Alan R. DeYoung	Dem.	11,748	30.28%	38,802	15,271

=== Wisconsin Assembly, 82nd district (2022) ===
Year	Election	Date	Elected				Defeated				Total	Plurality
2022	General	Nov. 8	Chuck Wichgers	Republican	16,705	56.74%	Deborah Davis	Dem.	12,715	43.19%	29,442	3,990

=== Wisconsin Assembly, 84th district (2024) ===
Year	Election	Date	Elected				Defeated				Total	Plurality
2024	General	Nov. 5	Chuck Wichgers	Republican	28,676	71.88%	Zach Roper	Dem.	11,174	28.01%	39,895	17,502

Wisconsin State Assembly
Preceded by David Craig	Member of the Wisconsin State Assembly from the 83rd district January 2, 2017 – January 2, 2023	Succeeded by Nik Rettinger
Preceded by Ken Skowronski	Member of the Wisconsin State Assembly from the 82nd district January 3, 2023 – January 6, 2025	Succeeded by Scott Allen
Preceded by Bob Donovan	Member of the Wisconsin State Assembly from the 84th district January 6, 2025 – present	Incumbent
