= Kathleen A. Krosnicki =

American politician

Kathleen A. Krosnicki is a former member of the Wisconsin State Assembly.

== Biography ==
Krosnicki was born on November 5, 1950, in Crandon, Wisconsin. She graduated from the University of Wisconsin–Milwaukee and is married with one child.

== Career ==
Krosnicki was elected to the Assembly in 1992. She is a Republican.
