= 102nd Wisconsin Legislature =

Wisconsin legislative term for 2015–2016

| ← | 101st | 103rd | → |
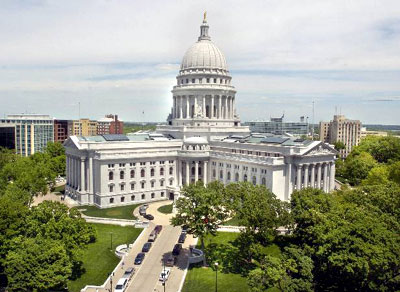
- Wisconsin State Capitol

Overview
- Legislative body: Wisconsin Legislature
- Meeting place: Wisconsin State Capitol
- Term: January 5, 2015 – January 4, 2017
- Election: November 4, 2014

Senate
- Members: 33
- Senate President: Mary Lazich (R)
- President pro tempore: Rick Gudex (R) ^{until Oct. 12, 2016}
- Party control: Republican

Assembly
- Members: 99
- Assembly Speaker: Robin Vos (R)
- Speaker pro tempore: Tyler August (R)
- Party control: Republican

Sessions
- Regular: January 5, 2015 – January 3, 2017

The One Hundred Second Wisconsin Legislature convened from January 5, 2015, through January 4, 2017, in regular session, though it adjourned for legislative activity on May 18, 2016.

Senators representing odd-numbered districts were newly elected for this session and were serving the first two years of a four-year term. Assembly members were elected to a two-year term. Assembly members and odd-numbered senators were elected in the general election of November 4, 2014. Senators representing even-numbered districts were serving the third and fourth year of their four-year term, having been elected in the general election held on November 6, 2012.

The governor of Wisconsin during this entire term was Republican Scott Walker, of Milwaukee County, serving the first two years of his second four-year term, having won re-election in the 2014 Wisconsin gubernatorial election.

== Major events ==
- January 5, 2015: Second inauguration of Scott Walker as Governor of Wisconsin.
- April 7, 2015: 2015 Wisconsin Spring election:
  - Wisconsin voters ratified an amendment to the state constitution, changing the rules for selecting the chief justice of the Wisconsin Supreme Court.
- April 29, 2015: Utilizing the recently passed constitutional amendment, Patience D. Roggensack became the 26th chief justice of the Wisconsin Supreme Court by a majority vote of the court's members.
- June 26, 2015: The United States Supreme Court published their decision in the case Obergefell v. Hodges, establishing the right to marriage for same-sex couples.
- September 21, 2015: Wisconsin Supreme Court justice N. Patrick Crooks died.
- October 12, 2015: Wisconsin governor Scott Walker appointed Rebecca Bradley to the Wisconsin Supreme Court, to succeed N. Patrick Crooks.
- July 31, 2016: Wisconsin Supreme Court justice David Prosser Jr. resigned.
- August 1, 2016: Wisconsin governor Scott Walker appointed Daniel Kelly to the Wisconsin Supreme Court, to succeed David Prosser Jr.
- October 12, 2016: Wisconsin state senator Rick Gudex died in office.
- November 8, 2016: 2016 United States general election:
  - Donald Trump (R) elected President of the United States.
  - Ron Johnson (R) re-elected United States senator from Wisconsin.

== Major legislation ==
- July 13, 2015: An Act relating to: state finances and appropriations, constituting the executive budget act of the 2015 legislature, 2015 Act 55.
- December 17, 2015: An Act relating to: reorganizing the Government Accountability Board, requiring the exercise of rule-making authority, and making appropriations, 2015 Act 118. Abolished the Wisconsin Government Accountability Board and replaced it with the Wisconsin Elections Commission and the Wisconsin Ethics Commission.

== Party summary ==
=== Senate summary ===
Senate Partisan composition Democratic: 14 seats Republican: 19 seats

| | Party (Shading indicates majority caucus) | | Total | |
| | Democratic | Republican | Total | Vacant |
|---|---|---|---|---|
| End of previous Legislature | 15 | 16 | 31 | 2 |
| Start of Reg. Session (Note: Republican Glenn Grothman (20th district) resigned before the start of the session due to his election to the U.S. House of Representatives.) | 14 | 18 | 32 | 1 |
| From Apr. 15, 2015 (Note: Republican Duey Stroebel (20th district) was sworn in to succeed Glenn Grothman.) | 14 | 19 | 33 | 0 |
| From Jul. 17, 2015 (Note: Republican Paul Farrow (33rd district) resigned after his election as county executive.) | 14 | 18 | 32 | 1 |
| From Aug. 6, 2015 (Note: Republican Chris Kapenga (33rd district) was sworn in to succeed Paul Farrow.) | 14 | 19 | 33 | 0 |
| From Oct. 12, 2016 (Note: Republican Rick Gudex (18th district) died.) | 14 | 18 | 32 | 1 |
| Final voting share | 43.75% | 56.25% | | |
| Beginning of the next Legislature | 13 | 20 | 33 | 0 |

=== Assembly summary ===
Assembly Partisan composition Democratic: 36 seats Republican: 63 seats

| | Party (Shading indicates majority caucus) | | Total | |
| | Democratic | Republican | Total | Vacant |
|---|---|---|---|---|
| End of previous Legislature | 39 | 60 | 99 | 0 |
| Start of Reg. Session | 36 | 63 | 99 | 0 |
| From Aug. 6, 2015 (Note: Republican Chris Kapenga (99th district) resigned after his election to the state senate.) | 36 | 62 | 98 | 1 |
| From Oct. 9, 2015 (Note: Republican Cindi Duchow (99th district) was sworn in to succeed Chris Kapenga.) | 36 | 63 | 99 | 0 |
| Final voting share | 36.36% | 63.64% | | |
| Beginning of the next Legislature | 35 | 64 | 99 | 0 |

== Sessions ==
- Regular session: January 5, 2015 – January 4, 2017

== Leadership ==
=== Senate leadership ===
- President of the Senate: Mary Lazich (R–New Berlin)
- President pro tempore: Rick Gudex (R–Fond du Lac) (until Oct. 12, 2016)

Senate majority leadership (Republican)

- Senate Majority Leader: Scott L. Fitzgerald (R–Juneau)
- Assistant Majority Leader: Paul Farrow (R–Pewaukee) (until Jul. 17, 2015)
  - Leah Vukmir (R–Wauwatosa) (after Oct. 2015)
- Senate Majority Caucus Chair: Sheila Harsdorf (R–River Falls)
- Senate Majority Caucus Vice Chair: Van H. Wanggaard (R–Racine)

Senate minority leadership (Democratic)

- Senate Minority Leader: Jennifer Shilling (D–La Crosse)
- Assistant Minority Leader: Dave Hansen (D–Green Bay)
- Senate Minority Caucus Chair: Julie Lassa (D–Stevens Point)
- Senate Minority Caucus Vice Chair: Kathleen Vinehout (D–Alma)

=== Assembly leadership ===
- Speaker of the Assembly: Robin Vos (R–Burlington)
- Speaker pro tempore: Tyler August (R–Lake Geneva)

Assembly majority leadership (Republican)

- Assembly Majority Leader: Jim Steineke (R–Kaukauna)
- Assistant Majority Leader: Dan Knodl (R–Germantown)
- Assembly Majority Caucus Chair: John Murtha (R–Baldwin)
- Assembly Majority Caucus Vice Chair: Lee Nerison (R–Westby)
- Assembly Majority Caucus Secretary: Jessie Rodriguez (R–Franklin)
- Assembly Majority Caucus Sergeant-at-Arms: Samantha Kerkman (R–Salem)

Assembly minority leadership (Democratic)

- Assembly Minority Leader: Peter Barca (D–Kenosha)
- Assistant Minority Leader: Katrina Shankland (D–Stevens Point)
- Assembly Minority Caucus Chair: Andy Jorgensen (D–Fort Atkinson)
- Assembly Minority Caucus Vice Chair: JoCasta Zamarripa (D–Milwaukee)
- Assembly Minority Caucus Secretary: Beth Meyers (D–Bayfield)
- Assembly Minority Caucus Sergeant-at-Arms: Josh Zepnick (D–Milwaukee)

== Members ==
=== Members of the Senate ===
Members of the Senate for the One Hundred Second Wisconsin Legislature:

Senate partisan representation Democratic: 14 seats Republican: 19 seats

| Dist. | Senator | Party | Age (2015) | Home | First elected |
|---|---|---|---|---|---|
| 01 | Frank Lasee | Rep. | 53 | Ledgeview, Brown County | 2010 |
| 02 | Robert Cowles | Rep. | 64 | Green Bay, Brown County | 1987 |
| 03 | Tim Carpenter | Dem. | 54 | Milwaukee, Milwaukee County | 2002 |
| 04 | Lena Taylor | Dem. | 48 | Milwaukee, Milwaukee County | 2004 |
| 05 | Leah Vukmir | Rep. | 56 | Wauwatosa, Milwaukee County | 2010 |
| 06 | Nikiya Harris Dodd | Dem. | 39 | Milwaukee, Milwaukee County | 2012 |
| 07 | Chris Larson | Dem. | 34 | Milwaukee, Milwaukee County | 2010 |
| 08 | Alberta Darling | Rep. | 70 | River Hills, Milwaukee County | 1992 |
| 09 | Devin LeMahieu | Rep. | 42 | Oostburg, Sheboygan County | 2014 |
| 10 | Sheila Harsdorf | Rep. | 58 | River Falls, Pierce County | 2000 |
| 11 | Stephen Nass | Rep. | 62 | La Grange, Walworth County | 2014 |
| 12 | Tom Tiffany | Rep. | 57 | Little Rice, Oneida County | 2012 |
| 13 | Scott L. Fitzgerald | Rep. | 51 | Juneau, Dodge County | 1994 |
| 14 | Luther Olsen | Rep. | 63 | Ripon, Fond du Lac County | 2004 |
| 15 | Janis Ringhand | Dem. | 64 | Evansville, Rock County | 2014 |
| 16 | Mark F. Miller | Dem. | 71 | Monona, Dane County | 2004 |
| 17 | Howard Marklein | Rep. | 60 | Spring Green, Sauk County | 2014 |
| 18 | Rick Gudex (died Oct. 12, 2016) | Rep. | 46 | Fond du Lac, Fond du Lac County | 2012 |
| 18 | --Vacant from Oct. 12, 2016-- | | | | |
| 19 | Roger Roth | Rep. | 36 | Appleton, Outagamie County | 2014 |
| 20 | --Vacant until Apr. 15, 2015-- | | | | |
| 20 | Duey Stroebel (from Apr. 15, 2015) | Rep. | 55 | Saukville, Ozaukee County | 2015 |
| 21 | Van H. Wanggaard | Rep. | 62 | Racine, Racine County | 2010 |
| 22 | Robert Wirch | Dem. | 71 | Somers, Kenosha County | 1996 |
| 23 | Terry Moulton | Rep. | 68 | Chippewa Falls, Chippewa County | 2010 |
| 24 | Julie Lassa | Dem. | 44 | Stevens Point, Portage County | 2003 |
| 25 | Janet Bewley | Dem. | 63 | Mason, Bayfield County | 2014 |
| 26 | Fred Risser | Dem. | 87 | Madison, Dane County | 1962 |
| 27 | Jon Erpenbach | Dem. | 53 | Middleton, Dane County | 1998 |
| 28 | Mary Lazich | Rep. | 62 | New Berlin, Waukesha County | 1998 |
| 29 | Jerry Petrowski | Rep. | 64 | Marathon, Marathon County | 2012 |
| 30 | Dave Hansen | Dem. | 67 | Green Bay, Brown County | 2000 |
| 31 | Kathleen Vinehout | Dem. | 56 | Alma, Buffalo County | 2006 |
| 32 | Jennifer Shilling | Dem. | 45 | La Crosse, La Crosse County | 2011 |
| 33 | Paul Farrow (res. Jul. 17, 2015) | Rep. | 50 | Pewaukee, Waukesha County | 2012 |
| 33 | Chris Kapenga (from Aug. 6, 2015) | Rep. | 43 | Delafield, Waukesha County | 2015 |

=== Members of the Assembly ===
Members of the Assembly for the One Hundred Second Wisconsin Legislature:

Assembly partisan representation Democratic: 36 seats Republican: 63 seats

| Senate District | Assembly District | Representative | Party | Age (2015) | Home | First Elected |
|---|---|---|---|---|---|---|
| 01 | 01 | Joel Kitchens | Rep. | 57 | Sturgeon Bay | 2014 |
| 01 | 02 | Andre Jacque | Rep. | 34 | De Pere | 2010 |
| 01 | 03 | Alvin Ott | Rep. | 65 | Brillion | 1986 |
| 02 | 04 | David Steffen | Rep. | 43 | Howard | 2014 |
| 02 | 05 | Jim Steineke | Rep. | 44 | Kaukauna | 2010 |
| 02 | 06 | Gary Tauchen | Rep. | 61 | Bonduel | 2006 |
| 03 | 07 | Daniel Riemer | Dem. | 28 | Milwaukee | 2012 |
| 03 | 08 | Jocasta Zamarripa | Dem. | 38 | Milwaukee | 2010 |
| 03 | 09 | Josh Zepnick | Dem. | 46 | Milwaukee | 2002 |
| 04 | 10 | David Bowen | Dem. | 27 | Milwaukee | 2014 |
| 04 | 11 | Mandela Barnes | Dem. | 28 | Milwaukee | 2012 |
| 04 | 12 | Frederick P. Kessler | Dem. | 74 | Milwaukee | 1960 |
| 05 | 13 | Rob Hutton | Rep. | 47 | Brookfield | 2012 |
| 05 | 14 | Dale P. Kooyenga | Rep. | 35 | Brookfield | 2010 |
| 05 | 15 | Joe Sanfelippo | Rep. | 53 | New Berlin | 2012 |
| 06 | 16 | Leon Young | Dem. | 47 | Milwaukee | 1992 |
| 06 | 17 | LaTonya Johnson | Dem. | 42 | Milwaukee | 2012 |
| 06 | 18 | Evan Goyke | Dem. | 32 | Milwaukee | 2012 |
| 07 | 19 | Jon Richards | Dem. | 51 | Milwaukee | 1998 |
| 07 | 20 | Christine Sinicki | Dem. | 54 | Bay View | 1998 |
| 07 | 21 | Jessie Rodriguez | Rep. | 37 | Franklin | 2013 |
| 08 | 22 | Janel Brandtjen | Rep. | 48 | Menomonee Falls | 2014 |
| 08 | 23 | Jim Ott | Rep. | 67 | Mequon | 2006 |
| 08 | 24 | Dan Knodl | Rep. | 56 | Germantown | 2008 |
| 09 | 25 | Paul Tittl | Rep. | 53 | Manitowoc | 2012 |
| 09 | 26 | Terry Katsma | Rep. | 56 | Oostburg | 2014 |
| 09 | 27 | Tyler Vorpagel | Rep. | 29 | Plymouth | 2014 |
| 10 | 28 | Adam Jarchow | Rep. | 36 | Balsam Lake | 2014 |
| 10 | 29 | John Murtha | Rep. | 63 | Baldwin | 2006 |
| 10 | 30 | Dean Knudson | Rep. | 53 | Hudson | 2010 |
| 11 | 31 | Amy Loudenbeck | Rep. | 45 | Clinton | 2010 |
| 11 | 32 | Tyler August | Rep. | 31 | Lake Geneva | 2010 |
| 11 | 33 | Cody Horlacher | Rep. | 27 | Mukwonago | 2014 |
| 12 | 34 | Rob Swearingen | Rep. | 51 | Rhinelander | 2012 |
| 12 | 35 | Mary Czaja | Rep. | 51 | Birch | 2012 |
| 12 | 36 | Jeffrey Mursau | Rep. | 60 | Crivitz | 2004 |
| 13 | 37 | John Jagler | Rep. | 45 | Watertown | 2012 |
| 13 | 38 | Joel Kleefisch | Rep. | 43 | Oconomowoc | 2004 |
| 13 | 39 | Mark Born | Rep. | 38 | Beaver Dam | 2012 |
| 14 | 40 | Kevin David Petersen | Rep. | 50 | Waupaca | 2006 |
| 14 | 41 | Joan Ballweg | Rep. | 62 | Markesan | 2004 |
| 14 | 42 | Keith Ripp | Rep. | 53 | Lodi | 2008 |
| 15 | 43 | Andy Jorgensen | Dem. | 47 | Fort Atkinson | 2006 |
| 15 | 44 | Debra Kolste | Dem. | 61 | Janesville | 2012 |
| 15 | 45 | Mark Spreitzer | Dem. | 28 | Beloit | 2014 |
| 16 | 46 | Gary Hebl | Dem. | 63 | Sun Prairie | 2004 |
| 16 | 47 | Robb Kahl | Dem. | 42 | Monona | 2012 |
| 16 | 48 | Melissa Sargent | Dem. | 45 | Madison | 2012 |
| 17 | 49 | Travis Tranel | Rep. | 29 | Cuba City | 2010 |
| 17 | 50 | Edward Brooks | Rep. | 72 | Reedsburg | 2008 |
| 17 | 51 | Todd Novak | Rep. | 49 | Dodgeville | 2014 |
| 18 | 52 | Jeremy Thiesfeldt | Rep. | 48 | Fond du Lac | 2010 |
| 18 | 53 | Michael Schraa | Rep. | 53 | Oshkosh | 2008 |
| 18 | 54 | Gordon Hintz | Dem. | 41 | Oshkosh | 2006 |
| 19 | 55 | Mike Rohrkaste | Rep. | 56 | Neenah | 2014 |
| 19 | 56 | Dave Murphy | Rep. | 60 | Greenville | 2012 |
| 19 | 57 | Amanda Stuck | Dem. | 32 | Appleton | 2014 |
| 20 | 58 | Bob Gannon | Rep. | 55 | Slinger | 2014 |
| 20 | 59 | Jesse Kremer | Rep. | 37 | Kewaskum | 2014 |
| 20 | 60 | Robert Brooks | Rep. | 49 | Saukville | 2014 |
| 21 | 61 | Samantha Kerkman | Rep. | 40 | Salem | 2000 |
| 21 | 62 | Tom Weatherston | Rep. | 64 | Caledonia | 2012 |
| 21 | 63 | Robin Vos | Rep. | 46 | Burlington | 2004 |
| 22 | 64 | Peter Barca | Dem. | 59 | Kenosha | 1993 |
| 22 | 65 | Tod Ohnstad | Dem. | 62 | Kenosha | 2012 |
| 22 | 66 | Cory Mason | Dem. | 41 | Racine | 2006 |
| 23 | 67 | Tom Larson | Rep. | 66 | Colfax | 2010 |
| 23 | 68 | Kathy Bernier | Rep. | 58 | Chippewa Falls | 2010 |
| 23 | 69 | Bob Kulp | Rep. | 48 | Stratford | 2013 |
| 24 | 70 | Nancy VanderMeer | Rep. | 56 | Tomah | 2014 |
| 24 | 71 | Katrina Shankland | Dem. | 27 | Stevens Point | 2012 |
| 24 | 72 | Scott Krug | Rep. | 39 | Rome | 2010 |
| 25 | 73 | Nick Milroy | Dem. | 40 | Parkland | 2008 |
| 25 | 74 | Beth Meyers | Dem. | 55 | Bayfield | 2014 |
| 25 | 75 | Romaine Quinn | Rep. | 24 | Rice Lake | 2014 |
| 26 | 76 | Chris Taylor | Dem. | 46 | Madison | 2011 |
| 26 | 77 | Terese Berceau | Dem. | 64 | Madison | 1998 |
| 26 | 78 | Lisa Subeck | Dem. | 43 | Madison | 2014 |
| 27 | 79 | Dianne Hesselbein | Dem. | 43 | Middleton | 2012 |
| 27 | 80 | Sondy Pope | Dem. | 64 | Cross Plains | 2002 |
| 27 | 81 | Dave Considine | Dem. | 61 | Baraboo | 2014 |
| 28 | 82 | Ken Skowronski | Rep. | 76 | Franklin | 2013 |
| 28 | 83 | David Craig | Rep. | 35 | Big Bend | 2011 |
| 28 | 84 | Mike Kuglitsch | Rep. | 54 | New Berlin | 2010 |
| 29 | 85 | Dave Heaton | Rep. | 73 | Wausau | 2014 |
| 29 | 86 | John Spiros | Rep. | 53 | Marshfield | 2012 |
| 29 | 87 | James W. Edming | Rep. | 69 | True | 2014 |
| 30 | 88 | John Macco | Rep. | 56 | De Pere | 2014 |
| 30 | 89 | John Nygren | Rep. | 50 | Marinette | 2006 |
| 30 | 90 | Eric Genrich | Dem. | 35 | Green Bay | 2012 |
| 31 | 91 | Dana Wachs | Dem. | 57 | Eau Claire | 2008 |
| 31 | 92 | Chris Danou | Dem. | 47 | Trempealeau | 2008 |
| 31 | 93 | Warren Petryk | Rep. | 59 | Eleva | 2010 |
| 32 | 94 | Steve Doyle | Dem. | 56 | Onalaska | 2011 |
| 32 | 95 | Jill Billings | Dem. | 52 | La Crosse | 2011 |
| 32 | 96 | Lee Nerison | Rep. | 62 | Westby | 2004 |
| 33 | 97 | Scott Allen | Rep. | 49 | Waukesha | 2014 |
| 33 | 98 | Adam Neylon | Rep. | 30 | Pewaukee | 2013 |
| 33 | 99 | Chris Kapenga (res. Aug. 6, 2015) | Rep. | 42 | Delafield | 2010 |
| 33 | 99 | Cindi Duchow (from Oct. 9, 2015) | Rep. | 43 | Delafield | 2015 |

== Employees ==
=== Senate employees ===
- Chief Clerk: Jeffrey Renk
- Sergeant-at-Arms: Edward A. Blazel

=== Assembly employees ===
- Chief Clerk: Patrick E. Fuller
- Sergeant-at-Arms: Anne Tonnon Byers
