= 2014 Wisconsin State Assembly election =

- November 4, 2014

All 99 seats in the Wisconsin State Assembly 50 seats needed for a majority
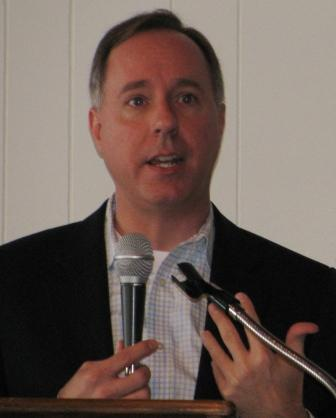

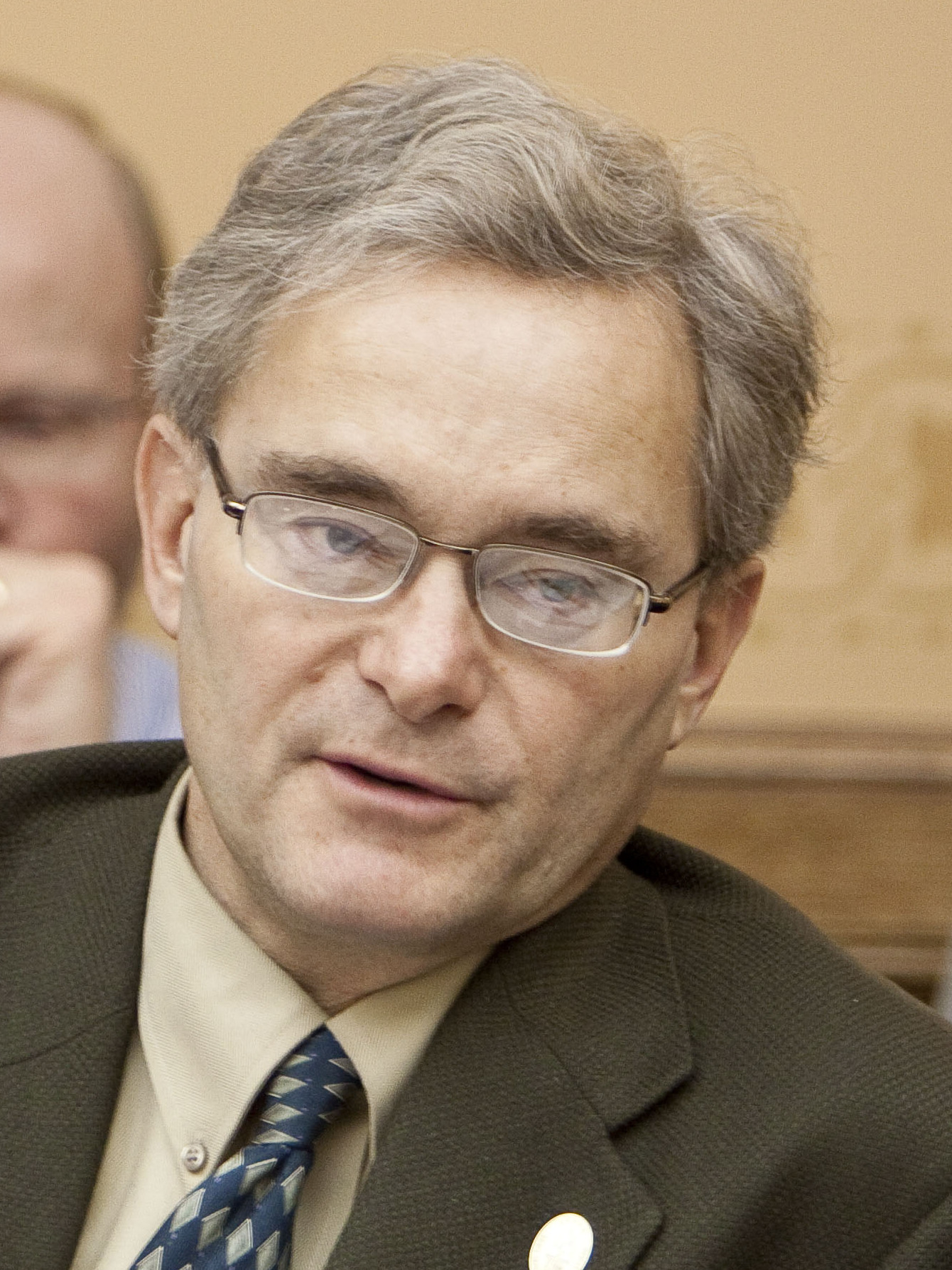
	Majority party	Minority party
Leader	Robin Vos	Peter Barca
Party	Republican	Democratic
Leader since	January 7, 2013	January 3, 2011
Leader's seat	63rd–Rochester	64th–Kenosha
Last election	60 seats, 46.15%	39 seats, 52.44%
Seats won	63	36
Seat change	▲3	▼3
Popular vote	1,181,670	883,475
Percentage	56.44%	42.20%
Swing	▲10.29pp	▼10.24pp
- Results: Republican hold Republican gain Democratic hold Vote Share: 40–50% 50–60% 60–70% 70–80% >90% 50–60% 60–70% 70–80% 80–90% >90%
Speaker before election
Robin Vos
Republican
Elected Speaker
Robin Vos
Republican

The Wisconsin State Assembly elections of 2014 were held on Tuesday, November 4, 2014. All 99 seats in the Wisconsin State Assembly were up for election. Before the election, 60 Assembly seats were held by Republicans and 39 seats were held by Democrats. The primary election was held on August 12, 2014.

Republicans flipped three Democratic-held Assembly seats but failed to achieve a two-thirds supermajority, entering the 102nd Wisconsin Legislature with 63 of 99 State Assembly seats.

Elected members took office on January 5, 2015.

== Results summary ==
Seats		Party (majority caucus shading)		Total
Seats		Democratic	Republican	Total
Last election (2012)		39	60	99
Total after last election (2012)		39	60	99
Total before this election		39	60	99
Up for election		39	60	99
of which:	Incumbent retiring	6	14	20
of which:	Vacated	0	0	0
of which:	Unopposed	19	28	47
This election		36	63	99
Change from last election		▼3	▲3	Steady
Total after this election		36	63	99
Change in total		▼3	▲3	Steady

Popular vote
Republican	56.44%
Democratic	42.20%
Independent	1.36%

Assembly seats
Republican	63.64%
Democratic	36.36%

=== Close races ===
Seats where the margin of victory was under 10%:

1. State Assembly district 51, 0.29%
2. State Assembly district 85, 0.38% (gain)
3. State Assembly district 54, 3.01%
4. State Assembly district 70, 5.64% (gain)
5. State Assembly district 68, 5.67%
6. State Assembly district 94, 8.12%
7. State Assembly district 81, 8.57%
8. State Assembly district 75, 9.76% (gain)

== Outgoing incumbents ==
=== Retiring ===
- Fred Clark (D–Baraboo) representing District 81 since 2012, (Note: First elected to the 42nd district in 2008) did not run for re-election.
- Mike Endsley (R–Sheboygan) representing District 26 since 2010, did not run for re-election after being diagnosed with early-onset Alzheimer's disease.
- Steve Kestell (R–Elkhart Lake) representing District 27 since 1998, did not run for re-election
- John Klenke (R–Green Bay) representing District 88 since 2010, did not run for re-election.
- Bill Kramer (R–Waukesha) representing District 97 since 2006, did not run for re-election after being indicted for sexual assault.
- Daniel LeMahieu (R–Cascade) representing District 59 since 2002, did not run for re-election.
- Sandy Pasch (D–Whitefish Bay) representing District 10 since 2012, (Note: First elected to the 22nd district in 2008) did not run for re-election.
- Don Pridemore (R–Hartford) representing District 22 since 2012, (Note: First elected to the 99th district in 2004) did not run for re-election.
- Erik Severson (R–Star Prairie) representing District 28 since 2010, did not run for re-election.
- Patricia Strachota (R–West Bend) representing District 58 since 2004, did not run for re-election.
- Chad Weininger (R–Green Bay) representing District 4 since 2010, did not run for re-election after accepting a county job.
- Mary Williams (R–Medford) representing District 87 since 2002, did not run for re-election.

=== Seeking other office ===
- Penny Bernard Schaber (D–Appleton) representing District 57 since 2008, ran for state Senate in the 19th Senate district, but lost the election.
- Garey Bies (R–Sister Bay) representing District 1 since 2000, ran for the Republican nomination for Secretary of State, but lost in the primary.
- Brett Hulsey (D–Madison) representing District 78 since 2012, (Note: First elected to the 77th district in 2010) ran for the Democratic nomination for Governor of Wisconsin, but withdrew before the primary.
- Dean Kaufert (R–Neenah) representing District 55 since 1990, was elected mayor of Neenah in the 2014 Spring election.
- Howard Marklein (R–Spring Green) representing District 51 since 2010, ran for state Senate in the 17th Senate district, and won the election.
- Stephen Nass (R–Whitewater) representing District 33 since 2012, (Note: Served the 38th district from 1991–1993 and the 31st district from 1993–2013) ran for state Senate in the 11th Senate district, and won the election.
- Jon Richards (D–Milwaukee) representing District 19 since 1998, ran for the Democratic nomination for attorney general, but lost in the primary.
- Janis Ringhand (D–Evansville) representing District 45 since 2012, (Note: First elected to the 80th district in 2010) ran for state Senate in the 15th Senate district, and won the election.
- Duey Stroebel (R–Cedarburg) representing District 60 since 2011, ran for U.S. House of Representatives in Wisconsin's 6th congressional district, but lost the primary.

== Predictions ==
Source	Ranking	As of
Governing	Safe R	October 20, 2014

== Election results ==
Dist.	Incumbent				This race	
Dist.	Member	Party	First elect	Status	Candidates	Results
01	Garey Bies	Republican	2000	Ran for Secretary of State	✓ Joel Kitchens (Rep.) 56.7%; Joe Majeski (Dem.) 43.24%	Incumbent retired to run for Secretary of State; New member elected Republican hold
02	André Jacque	Republican	2010	Running	✓ André Jacque (Rep.) 98.64%	Incumbent re-elected
03	Alvin Ott	Republican	1986	Running	✓ Alvin Ott (Rep.) 100%	Incumbent re-elected
04	Chad Weininger	Republican	2010	Not running	✓ David Steffen (Rep.) 58.99%; Chris Plaunt (Dem.) 40.88%	Incumbent retired New member elected Republican hold
05	Jim Steineke	Republican	2010	Running	✓ Jim Steineke (Rep.) 62.35%; Jeff McCabe (Dem.) 37.65%	Incumbent re-elected
06	Gary Tauchen	Republican	2006	Running	✓ Gary Tauchen (Rep.) 99.32%	Incumbent re-elected
07	Daniel Riemer	Democratic	2012	Running	✓ Daniel Riemer (Dem.) 55.52%; Scott Espeseth (Rep.) 44.16%	Incumbent re-elected
08	Jocasta Zamarripa	Democratic	2010	Running	✓ Jocasta Zamarripa (Dem.) 79.87%; Vincent Synowicz (Rep.) 19.69%	Incumbent re-elected
09	Josh Zepnick	Democratic	2002	Running	✓ Josh Zepnick (Dem.) 97.68%	Incumbent re-elected
10	Sandy Pasch	Democratic	2008	Not running	✓ David Bowen (Dem.) 98.95%	Incumbent retired New member elected Democratic hold
11	Mandela Barnes	Democratic	2012	Running	✓ Mandela Barnes (Dem.) 98.83%	Incumbent re-elected
12	Fred Kessler	Democratic	2004	Running	✓ Fred Kessler (Dem.) 97.94%	Incumbent re-elected
13	Rob Hutton	Republican	2012	Running	✓ Rob Hutton (Rep.) 96.85%	Incumbent re-elected
14	Dale Kooyenga	Republican	2010	Running	✓ Dale Kooyenga (Rep.) 96.37%	Incumbent re-elected
15	Joe Sanfelippo	Republican	2012	Running	✓ Joe Sanfelippo (Rep.) 62.91%; John F. Weishan Jr. (Dem.) 36.93%	Incumbent re-elected
16	Leon Young	Democratic	1992	Running	✓ Leon Young (Dem.) 98.41%	Incumbent re-elected
17	LaTonya Johnson	Democratic	2012	Running	✓ La Tonya Johnson (Dem.) 87.25%; Eugenie M. Stackowitz (Ind.) 12.43%	Incumbent re-elected
18	Evan Goyke	Democratic	2012	Running	✓ Evan Goyke (Dem.) 98.5%	Incumbent re-elected
19	Jon Richards	Democratic	1998	Ran for Attorney General	✓ Jonathan Brostoff (Dem.) 81.44%; Joseph Thomas Klein (Ind.) 17.76%	Incumbent retired to run for Attorney General; New member elected Democratic hold
20	Christine Sinicki	Democratic	1998	Running	✓ Christine M. Sinicki (Dem.) 56.02%; Molly McGartland (Rep.) 43.81%	Incumbent re-elected
21	Jessie Rodriguez	Republican	2013 (special)	Running	✓ Jessie Rodriguez (Rep.) 96.54%	Incumbent re-elected
22	Don Pridemore	Republican	2004	Not running	✓ Janel Brandtjen (Rep.) 70.02%; Jessie Read (Dem.) 29.86%	Incumbent retired New member elected Republican hold
23	Jim Ott	Republican	2006	Running	✓ Jim Ott (Rep.) 63.51%; Beth L. Lueck (Dem.) 36.41%	Incumbent re-elected
24	Dan Knodl	Republican	2008	Running	✓ Dan Knodl (Rep.) 97.06%	Incumbent re-elected
25	Paul Tittl	Republican	2012	Running	✓ Paul Tittl (Rep.) 100%	Incumbent re-elected
26	Mike Endsley	Republican	2010	Not running	✓ Terry Katsma (Rep.) 61.18%; Terry Van Akkeren (Dem.) 38.64%	Incumbent retired New member elected Republican hold
27	Steve Kestell	Republican	1998	Not running	✓ Tyler Vorpagel (Rep.) 62.82%; Scott Grover Heinig (Dem.) 36.99%	Incumbent retired New member elected Republican hold
28	Erik Severson	Republican	2010	Not running	✓ Adam Jarchow (Rep.) 62.23%; Travis Schachtner (Dem.) 37.77%	Incumbent retired New member elected Republican hold
29	John Murtha	Republican	2006	Running	✓ John Murtha (Rep.) 98.49%	Incumbent re-elected
30	Dean Knudson	Republican	2010	Running	✓ Dean Knudson (Rep.) 59.7%; Darrel Laumann (Dem.) 37.05%; Laurie Kroeger (Ind.) 3.2%	Incumbent re-elected
31	Amy Loudenbeck	Republican	2010	Running	✓ Amy Loudenbeck (Rep.) 98.54%	Incumbent re-elected
32	Tyler August	Republican	2010	Running	✓ Tyler August (Rep.) 65.79%; Alan Kupsik (Dem.) 34.03%	Incumbent re-elected
33	Stephen Nass	Republican	1990	Ran for state Senate	✓ Cody Horlacher (Rep.) 98.04%	Incumbent retired to run for Wisconsin Senate; New member elected Republican hold
34	Rob Swearingen	Republican	2012	Running	✓ Rob Swearingen (Rep.) 98.12%	Incumbent re-elected
35	Mary Czaja	Republican	2012	Running	✓ Mary Czaja (Rep.) 98.58%	Incumbent re-elected
36	Jeffrey Mursau	Republican	2004	Running	✓ Jeffrey Mursau (Rep.) 99.86%	Incumbent re-elected
37	John Jagler	Republican	2012	Running	✓ John Jagler (Rep.) 58.84%; Mary I. Arnold (Dem.) 41.1%	Incumbent re-elected
38	Joel Kleefisch	Republican	2004	Running	✓ Joel Kleefisch (Rep.) 62.91%; Tom Chojnacki (Dem.) 37%	Incumbent re-elected
39	Mark Born	Republican	2012	Running	✓ Mark Born (Rep.) 73.74%; Richard Bennett (Dem.) 26.25%	Incumbent re-elected
40	Kevin David Petersen	Republican	2006	Running	✓ Kevin Petersen (Rep.) 98.96%	Incumbent re-elected
41	Joan Ballweg	Republican	2004	Running	✓ Joan Ballweg (Rep.) 60.99%; Joe Kallas (Dem.) 39%	Incumbent re-elected
42	Keith Ripp	Republican	2008	Running	✓ Keith Ripp (Rep.) 57.48%; George Ferriter (Dem.) 42.46%	Incumbent re-elected
43	Andy Jorgensen	Democratic	2006	Running	✓ Andy Jorgensen (Dem.) 59.71%; Leon L. Hebert (Rep.) 40.16%	Incumbent re-elected
44	Debra Kolste	Democratic	2008	Running	✓ Debra Kolste (Dem.) 67.95%; Jacob Dorsey (Rep.) 32.05%	Incumbent re-elected
45	Janis Ringhand	Democratic	2010	Ran for state Senate	✓ Mark Spreitzer (Dem.) 99.02%	Incumbent retired to run for Wisconsin Senate; New member elected Democratic hold
46	Gary Hebl	Democratic	2004	Running	✓ Gary Hebl (Dem.) 97.32%	Incumbent re-elected
47	Robb Kahl	Democratic	2012	Running	✓ Robb Kahl (Dem.) 81.28%; Phillip N. Anderson (Ind.) 18.37%	Incumbent re-elected
48	Melissa Sargent	Democratic	2012	Running	✓ Melissa Sargent (Dem.) 98.48%	Incumbent re-elected
49	Travis Tranel	Republican	2010	Running	✓ Travis Tranel (Rep.) 61.38%; Chad Henneman (Dem.) 38.56%	Incumbent re-elected
50	Edward Brooks	Republican	2008	Running	✓ Edward Brooks (Rep.) 57.77%; Christopher Miller (Dem.) 42.19%	Incumbent re-elected
51	Howard Marklein	Republican	2010	Ran for state Senate	✓ Todd Novak (Rep.) 47.48%; Dick Cates (Dem.) 47.19%; Adam Laufenberg (Ind.) 5.25%	Incumbent retired to run for state Senate; New member elected Republican hold
52	Jeremy Thiesfeldt	Republican	2010	Running	✓ Jeremy Thiesfeldt (Rep.) 100%	Incumbent re-elected
53	Michael Schraa	Republican	2012	Running	✓ Michael Schraa (Rep.) 98.55%	Incumbent re-elected
54	Gordon Hintz	Democratic	2006	Running	✓ Gordon Hintz (Dem.) 51.37%; Mark Elliott (Rep.) 48.36%	Incumbent re-elected
55	Dean Kaufert	Republican	1990	Ran for Mayor of Neenah, Wisconsin	✓ Mike Rohrkaste (Rep.) 57.74%; Mark Westphal (Dem.) 42.15%	Incumbent retired after election as mayor New member elected Republican hold
56	Dave Murphy	Republican	2012	Running	✓ Dave Murphy (Rep.) 99.57%	Incumbent re-elected
57	Penny Bernard Schaber	Democratic	2008	Ran for state Senate	✓ Amanda Stuck (Dem.) 54.15%; Chris Klein (Rep.) 45.76%	Incumbent retired to run for state Senate; New member elected Democratic hold
58	Patricia Strachota	Republican	2004	Not running	✓ Bob Gannon (Rep.) 97.86%	Incumbent retired New member elected Republican hold
59	Daniel LeMahieu	Republican	2002	Not running	✓ Jesse Kremer (Rep.) 99.02%	Incumbent retired New member elected Republican hold
60	Duey Stroebel	Republican	2011 (special)	Ran for U.S. House of Representatives	✓ Robert Brooks (Rep.) 98.93%	Incumbent retired to run for U.S. House; New member elected Republican hold
61	Samantha Kerkman	Republican	2000	Running	✓ Samantha Kerkman (Rep.) 97.41%	Incumbent re-elected
62	Tom Weatherston	Republican	2012	Running	✓ Tom Weatherston (Rep.) 97.61%	Incumbent re-elected
63	Robin Vos	Republican	2004	Running	✓ Robin Vos (Rep.) 63.23%; Andy Mitchell (Dem.) 36.7%	Incumbent re-elected
64	Peter Barca	Democratic	1984 (2008)	Running	✓ Peter Barca (Dem.) 95.54%	Incumbent re-elected
65	Tod Ohnstad	Democratic	2012	Running	✓ Tod Ohnstad (Dem.) 96.93%	Incumbent re-elected
66	Cory Mason	Democratic	2006	Running	✓ Cory Mason (Dem.) 80.73%; George Meyers (Ind.) 18.61%	Incumbent re-elected
67	Tom Larson	Republican	2010	Running	✓ Tom Larson (Rep.) 60.57%; Gary Stene (Dem.) 39.43%	Incumbent re-elected
68	Kathy Bernier	Republican	2010	Running	✓ Kathy Bernier (Rep.) 52.82%; Jeff Peck (Dem.) 47.15%	Incumbent re-elected
69	Bob Kulp	Republican	2013	Running	✓ Bob Kulp (Rep.) 69.05%; Norbert Salamonski (Dem.) 30.95%	Incumbent re-elected
70	Amy Sue Vruwink	Democratic	2002	Running	✓ Nancy VanderMeer (Rep.) 52.78%; Amy Sue Vruwink (Dem.) 47.14%	Incumbent defeated New member elected Republican gain
71	Katrina Shankland	Democratic	2012	Running	✓ Katrina Shankland (Dem.) 97.79%	Incumbent re-elected
72	Scott Krug	Republican	2010	Running	✓ Scott Krug (Rep.) 55.95%; Dana W. Duncan (Dem.) 44.02%	Incumbent re-elected
73	Nick Milroy	Democratic	2008	Running	✓ Nick Milroy (Dem.) 99.8%	Incumbent re-elected
74	Janet Bewley	Democratic	2010	Ran for state Senate	✓ Beth Meyers (Dem.) 57.43%; Jamey Francis (Rep.) 42.54%	Incumbent retired to run for state Senate; New member elected Democratic hold
75	Stephen J. Smith	Democratic	2012	Running	✓ Romaine Quinn (Rep.) 54.86%; Stephen J. Smith (Dem.) 45.1%	Incumbent defeated New member elected Republican gain
76	Chris Taylor	Democratic	2011 (special)	Running	✓ Chris Taylor (Dem.) 98.15%	Incumbent re-elected
77	Terese Berceau	Democratic	1998	Running	✓ Terese Berceau (Dem.) 98.66%	Incumbent re-elected
78	Brett Hulsey	Democratic	2012	Ran for governor	✓ Lisa Subeck (Dem.) 97.99%	Incumbent retired to run for governor New member elected Democratic hold
79	Dianne Hesselbein	Democratic	2012	Running	✓ Dianne Hesselbein (Dem.) 62.24%; Brent Renteria (Rep.) 37.67%	Incumbent re-elected
80	Sondy Pope	Democratic	2002	Running	✓ Sondy Pope (Dem.) 97.71%	Incumbent re-elected
81	Fred Clark	Democratic	2008	Not running	✓ David Considine (Dem.) 54.27%; Ashton Kirsch (Rep.) 45.7%	Incumbent retired New member elected Democratic hold
82	Ken Skowronski	Republican	2013 (special)	Running	✓ Ken Skowronski (Rep.) 97.27%	Incumbent re-elected
83	Dave Craig	Republican	2011 (special)	Running	✓ Dave Craig (Rep.) 72.99%; Jim Brownlow (Dem.) 26.89%	Incumbent re-elected
84	Mike Kuglitsch	Republican	2010	Running	✓ Mike Kuglitsch (Rep.) 97.27%	Incumbent re-elected
85	Mandy Wright	Democratic	2012	Running	✓ Dave Heaton (Rep.) 50.19%; Mandy Wright (Dem.) 49.81%	Incumbent defeated New member elected Republican gain
86	John Spiros	Republican	2012	Running	✓ John Spiros (Rep.) 62.49%; Nancy Stencil (Dem.) 37.51%	Incumbent re-elected
87	Mary Williams	Republican	2002	Not running	✓ James W. Edming (Rep.) 66.37%; Richard Pulcher (Dem.) 33.36%	Incumbent retired New member elected Republican hold
88	John Klenke	Republican	2010	Not running	✓ John Macco (Rep.) 56.2%; Dan Robinson (Dem.) 43.72%	Incumbent retired New member elected Republican hold
89	John Nygren	Republican	2006	Running	✓ John Nygren (Rep.) 99.38%	Incumbent re-elected
90	Eric Genrich	Democratic	2012	Running	✓ Eric Genrich (Dem.) 54.94%; Eric Wimberger (Rep.) 36.9%; Shae Sortwell (Ind.) 8.04%	Incumbent re-elected
91	Dana Wachs	Democratic	2008	Running	✓ Dana Wachs (Dem.) 96.97%	Incumbent re-elected
92	Chris Danou	Democratic	2008	Running	✓ Chris Danou (Dem.) 56.58%; Isaac Weix (Rep.) 43.38%	Incumbent re-elected
93	Warren Petryk	Republican	2010	Running	✓ Warren Petryk (Rep.) 55.4%; Jeff Smith (Dem.) 44.55%	Incumbent re-elected
94	Steve Doyle	Democratic	2011 (special)	Running	✓ Steve Doyle (Dem.) 54.06%; Tracie Happel (Rep.) 45.94%	Incumbent re-elected
95	Jill Billings	Democratic	2011 (special)	Running	✓ Jill Billings (Dem.) 100%	Incumbent re-elected
96	Lee Nerison	Republican	2004	Running	✓ Lee Nerison (Rep.) 58.91%; Peter Flesch (Dem.) 41.06%	Incumbent re-elected
97	Bill Kramer	Republican	2006	Not running	✓ Scott Allen (Rep.) 97.83%	Incumbent retired New member elected Republican hold
98	Adam Neylon	Republican	2013 (special)	Running	✓ Adam Neylon (Rep.) 98.64%	Incumbent re-elected
99	Chris Kapenga	Republican	2010	Running	✓ Chris Kapenga (Rep.) 77.82%; Alice Jensen (Dem.) 22.08%	Incumbent re-elected

== See also ==
- 2014 Wisconsin elections
  - 2014 Wisconsin gubernatorial election
  - 2014 Wisconsin Attorney General election
  - 2014 Wisconsin Senate election
  - 2014 United States House of Representatives elections in Wisconsin
- 2014 United States elections
- Wisconsin State Assembly
- Elections in Wisconsin
- Redistricting in Wisconsin
