= 2023 Wisconsin elections =

- April 4, 2023

The 2023 Wisconsin Spring Election was held in the U.S. state of Wisconsin on April 4, 2023. The featured race at the top of the ticket was for an open seat on the Wisconsin Supreme Court, which became the most expensive judicial election in history. Several other nonpartisan local and judicial offices were also decided on the April 4 ballot, including mayoral elections in some of Wisconsin's larger cities—Green Bay, Madison, and Racine. In addition, a special election was held in the 8th State Senate district, concurrent with the Spring elections. The 2023 Wisconsin Spring Primary was held February 21, 2023.

The Democratic Party of Wisconsin was seen as broadly victorious across the state's Spring elections. In the Supreme Court race, the Democrats' preferred candidate, Janet Protasiewicz, defeated the Republicans' preferred candidate, flipping the ideological balance of the court in favor of the liberals. Incumbent Democratic mayors in Green Bay, Madison, and Racine were all re-elected. In addition, the incumbent chief judge of the Wisconsin Court of Appeals was defeated by a Democratic-backed challenger.

The one significant Republican bright spot was the special election for Wisconsin's 8th State Senate district, where they narrowly defended their super-majority in the Wisconsin Senate. Wisconsin voters also ratified a pair of Republican-backed amendments to the state constitution related to guidance to judges on questions of pre-trial release and bail conditions. Because the winner of the special Senate election was an incumbent state representative, another special election was held on July 18, 2023, to fill the vacancy in the 24th Assembly district, which was also won by the Republican candidate.

== State elections ==
=== Legislature ===
==== State Senate 8th district special election ====
A special election was held concurrent with the Spring general election to fill the 8th State Senate seat vacated by the resignation of Alberta Darling. Republican state representative Dan Knodl narrowly defeated Democratic attorney Jodi Habush Sinykin in the special election on April 4, 2023, giving the Republicans a super-majority in the Wisconsin Senate.

The primary for this election was held concurrent with the spring primary, February 21, 2023. Knodl prevailed in the Republican primary over state representative Janel Brandtjen and Thiensville village president Van Mobley. Former state senator Randy Hopper briefly entered the race, but then withdrew and endorsed Knodl.

Wisconsin Senate, 8th District Special Democratic Primary, 2023
Party	Candidate	Votes	%
Democratic	Jodi Habush Sinykin	17,670	99.90%
	Scattering	17	0.10%
Total votes		17,687	100.0%

Wisconsin Senate, 8th District Special Republican Primary, 2023
Party	Candidate	Votes	%
Republican	Dan Knodl	13,996	56.82%
Republican	Janel Brandtjen	6,870	27.89%
Republican	Van Mobley	3,743	15.19%
	Scattering	25	0.10%
Total votes		24,634	100.0%

Wisconsin Senate, 8th District Special General Election, 2023
Party	Candidate	Votes	%	±%
Republican	Dan Knodl	38,492	50.81%	−3.43%
Democratic	Jodi Habush Sinykin	37,200	49.11%	+3.40%
N/a	Scattering	59	0.08%	+0.02%
Plurality		1,292	1.71%	-6.83%
Total votes		75,751	100.0%	-36.70%
Republican hold				

==== State Assembly 24th district special election ====
A special election was held in Wisconsin's 24th Assembly district on July 18, 2023, to fill the vacancy caused by the election of Dan Knodl to the Wisconsin Senate in the Spring election. The Republican nominee, Ozaukee County supervisor Paul Melotik, defeated the Democratic nominee, Mequon businessman, Bob Tatterson.

A special primary was held on June 20, 2023, but neither party had a contest for the nomination. Perennial Wisconsin candidate Spencer Zimmerman also collected petitions to get on the ballot as a Republican, but did not meet the necessary threshold.

Wisconsin Assembly, 24th District Special Election, 2023
Party	Candidate	Votes	%	±%
Special Election, July 18, 2023
Republican	Paul Melotik	6,455	53.68%	−7.47%
Democratic	Bob Tatterson	5,568	46.30%	+7.49%
N/a	Scattering	3	0.02%	
Plurality		887	7.38%	-14.96%
Total votes		12,026	100.0%	-62.09%
Republican hold				

=== Judicial ===
==== State Supreme Court ====
A regularly scheduled Wisconsin Supreme Court election was held on April 4, 2023. The incumbent judge, Patience D. Roggensack, did not run for re-election, retiring after 20 years on the court. Milwaukee County circuit judge Janet Protasiewicz defeated former Wisconsin Supreme Court justice Daniel Kelly in the April 4 general election, flipping the ideological majority on the court.

Circuit judges Jennifer Dorow of Waukesha County and Everett Mitchell of Dane County were eliminated in the February primary. Kelly and Dorow were considered conservatives, while Mitchell and Protasiewicz were considered liberals.

The 2023 Wisconsin Supreme Court election was described as the most important election of the year. In 2020, allies of former president Donald Trump attempted to challenge the result of the U.S. general election in Wisconsin; the Wisconsin Supreme Court rejected the attempt by a one-vote margin. A Republican victory could have led to a Supreme Court which might in similar circumstances disrupt a democratically decided election. The parties both knew what was at stake, and between them by 20 March 2023 had jointly spent US$27m on their campaigns—making it the most expensive judicial race in American history.

Wisconsin Supreme Court Election, 2023
Party	Candidate	Votes	%	±%
Primary Election, February 21, 2023
Nonpartisan	Janet Protasiewicz	446,403	46.42%	
Nonpartisan	Daniel Kelly	232,751	24.20%	−25.84%
Nonpartisan	Jennifer Dorow	210,100	21.85%	
Nonpartisan	Everett Mitchell	71,895	7.48%	
Write-in		516	0.05%	-0.13%
Total votes		961,665	100.0%	+36.38%
General Election, April 4, 2023
Nonpartisan	Janet Protasiewicz	1,021,822	55.43%	
Nonpartisan	Daniel Kelly	818,391	44.39%	−0.33%
Write-in		3,267	0.18%	+0.11%
Plurality		202,652	11.04%	+0.48%
Total votes		1,843,480	100.0%	+18.93%

==== State Court of Appeals ====
Two seats on the Wisconsin Court of Appeals were up for election on April 4, 2023.

- In District I, William W. Brash III, chief judge of the Court of Appeals, was defeated by Milwaukee labor and employment attorney Sara Geenen. Brash had been appointed by Governor Scott Walker in 2015 and was elected to his first full term in 2017.
- In District IV, incumbent Michael R. Fitzpatrick did not run for re-election. Dane County circuit judge Chris Taylor was elected to succeed him, running without opposition.

Wisconsin Court of Appeals District I Election, 2023
Party	Candidate	Votes	%
General Election, April 4, 2023
Nonpartisan	Sara Geenen	130,030	68.18%
Nonpartisan	William W. Brash III (incumbent)	59,587	31.25%
	Scattering	1,088	0.57%
Plurality		70,443	36.94%
Total votes		190,705	100.0%

==== State Circuit Courts ====
Forty nine of the state's 261 circuit court seats were up for election in April 2023. That included four new seats that were created in 2023 due to a 2020 act of the Legislature. Only 11 seats were contested, only four incumbent judges were facing a challenger, two were defeated.

- In Clark County, attorney William Bratcher defeated attorney Jake Brunette for a newly created judicial seat.
- In Grant County, incumbent Grant County district attorney Lisa A. Riniker defeated former Jefferson County circuit judge Jennifer Day for the judicial seat being vacated by Judge Robert P. VanDeHey. Lancaster attorney Jeffrey W. Erickson was eliminated in the primary.
- In Oneida County, incumbent district attorney Michael W. Schiek defeated incumbent circuit judge Mary Roth Burns. Oneida County corporation counsel Mike Fugle was eliminated in the primary.
- In Sawyer County, Monica Isham Chase, the deputy attorney general for Lac Courte Oreilles Band of Lake Superior Chippewa Indians, defeated attorney Thomas J. Duffy for a newly created judicial seat.
- In Sheboygan County Branch 2, municipal judge Natasha L. Torry was elected to the seat being vacated by Judge Kent Hoffman. Former assistant district attorney James A. Haasch dropped out of the race but still appeared on the ballot.
- In Sheboygan County Branch 5, attorney George Limbeck defeated public defender Cassandra Van Gompel for the judicial seat being vacated by Judge Daniel Borowski.
- In Vernon County, district attorney Timothy J. Gaskell defeated attorney Angela Lynn Palmer-Fisher for the judicial seat being vacated by Judge Darcy Rood.
- In Washington County, incumbent judge Ryan J. Hetzel defeated a challenge from Hartford attorney Russell Jones.
- In Waukesha County, former state representative Cody Horlacher defeated incumbent circuit judge Fred Strampe.
- In Winnebago County, incumbent judge Scott C. Woldt defeated a challenge from former Winnebago County circuit judge LaKeisha D. Haase.
- In Wood County, Wisconsin Rapids attorney Timothy Gebert defeated the incumbent district attorney Craig Lambert for a newly created judicial seat.

Circuit	Branch	Incumbent	Elected			Defeated			Defeated in Primary
Circuit	Branch	Incumbent	Name	Votes	%	Name	Votes	%	Name(s)
Burnett		Melissia R. Mogen	Melissia R. Mogen	4,143	100.0%	--Unopposed--			
Clark	2	--New Seat--	William Bratcher	4,194	51.20%	Jake Brunette	3,982	48.61%	
Columbia	2	W. Andrew Voigt	W. Andrew Voigt	14,159	98.95%	--Unopposed--			
Dodge	2	Martin J. De Vries	Martin J. De Vries	18,530	100.0%	--Unopposed--			
Door	2	David L. Weber	David L. Weber	8,710	98.91%	--Unopposed--			
Grant	1	Robert P. Van De Hey	Lisa A. Riniker	6,873	53.08%	Jennifer Day	6,035	46.61%	Jeffrey W. Erickson
Green Lake		Mark Slate	Mark Slate	4,746	99.37%	--Unopposed--			
Jefferson	4	Bennett J. Brantmeier	Bennett J. Brantmeier	18,953	98.96%	--Unopposed--			
Kenosha	4	Anthony Milisauskas	Anthony Milisauskas	29,760	98.47%	--Unopposed--			
Kenosha	7	Jodi L. Meier	Jodi L. Meier	30,137	98.58%	--Unopposed--			
Manitowoc	3	Robert Dewane	Robert Dewane	18,762	99.24%	--Unopposed--			
Manitowoc	4	--New Seat--	Anthony A. Lambrecht	18,017	99.34%	--Unopposed--			
Marathon	4	Gregory J. Strasser	Gregory J. Strasser	31,616	99.18%	--Unopposed--			
Marathon	5	Michael K. Moran	Michael K. Moran	31,329	99.19%	--Unopposed--			
Milwaukee	4	Michael J. Hanrahan	Michael J. Hanrahan	140,875	98.25%	--Unopposed--			
Milwaukee	9	Paul R. Van Grunsven	Paul R. Van Grunsven	140,262	98.44%	--Unopposed--			
Milwaukee	10	Michelle A. Havas	Michelle A. Havas	140,678	98.51%	--Unopposed--			
Milwaukee	13	Mary Triggiano	Ana Berrios-Schroeder	141,833	98.79%	--Unopposed--			
Milwaukee	18	Pedro Colón	Pedro Colón	143,733	98.71%	--Unopposed--			
Milwaukee	21	Cynthia M. Davis	Cynthia M. Davis	141,995	98.79%	--Unopposed--			
Milwaukee	33	Carl Ashley	Carl Ashley	141,787	98.85%	--Unopposed--			
Milwaukee	35	Frederick C. Rosa	Frederick C. Rosa	140,392	98.87%	--Unopposed--			
Milwaukee	47	Kristy Yang	Kristy Yang	141,930	98.90%	--Unopposed--			
Oconto	1	Michael T. Judge	Michael T. Judge	10,332	99.40%	--Unopposed--			
Oneida	1	Mary Burns	Michael W. Schiek	6,634	53.74%	Mary Burns	5,697	46.15%	Mike Fugle
Outagamie	1	Mark J. McGinnis	Mark J. McGinnis	38,221	100.0%	--Unopposed--			
Polk	1	Daniel J. Tolan	Daniel J. Tolan	10,451	100.0%	--Unopposed--			
Polk	2	Jeffrey L. Anderson	Jeffrey L. Anderson	10,433	100.0%	--Unopposed--			
Portage	1	Michael Zell	Michael Zell	15,990	99.24%	--Unopposed--			
Richland		Lisa A. McDougal	Lisa A. McDougal	3,659	99.27%	--Unopposed--			
Rock	4	Ashley Morse	Ashley Morse	30,048	98.85%	--Unopposed--			
Rock	6	John M. Wood	John M. Wood	29,430	98.79%	--Unopposed--			
Sawyer	2	--New Seat--	Monica M. Isham	4,161	96.50%	--Unopposed--			
Sheboygan	2	Kent Hoffman	Natasha L. Torry	17,516	52.47%	James A. Haasch	15,808	47.35%	
Sheboygan	3	Angela Sutkiewicz	Angela Sutkiewicz	25,874	96.50%	--Unopposed--			
Sheboygan	5	Daniel J. Borowski	George Limbeck	16,284	51.24%	Cassandra Van Gompel	15,417	48.51%	
Trempealeau		Rian W. Radtke	Rian W. Radtke	6,248	99.43%	--Unopposed--			
Vernon		Darcy Rood	Timothy J. Gaskell	4,785	50.90%	Angela Palmer-Fisher	4,605	48.98%	
Washington	1	Ryan J. Hetzel	Ryan J. Hetzel	27,512	59.34%	Russ Jones	18,850	40.66%	
Washington	3	Michael S. Kenitz	Michael S. Kenitz	36,713	100.0%	--Unopposed--			
Waukesha	3	Ralph M. Ramirez	Ralph M. Ramirez	103,459	98.93%	--Unopposed--			
Waukesha	4	Lloyd V. Carter	Lloyd V. Carter	100,408	98.94%	--Unopposed--			
Waukesha	7	Fred Strampe	Cody Horlacher	71,228	55.20%	Fred Strampe	57,239	44.36%	
Waukesha	11	William J. Domina	William J. Domina	99,727	99.06%	--Unopposed--			
Waupaca	1	Troy L. Nielsen	Troy L. Nielsen	11,834	98.84%	--Unopposed--			
Waushara	1	Guy Dutcher	Guy Dutcher	6,438	100.0%	--Unopposed--			
Winnebago	2	Scott C. Woldt	Scott C. Woldt	23,463	51.40%	LaKeisha D. Haase	22,104	48.42%	
Winnebago	6	Daniel J. Bissett	Daniel J. Bissett	33,567	98.47%	--Unopposed--			
Wood	4	--New Seat--	Timothy Gebert	12,722	58.33%	Craig Lambert	9,031	41.41%	

=== Ballot measures ===
There were two amendments to the Constitution of Wisconsin on the ballot for the Spring general election. The proposed amendments were structured as two questions to voters for consideration of separate changes to Section 8 of Article I of the Wisconsin Constitution, dealing with conditions for pre-trial release of those accused of crimes. Both amendments were ratified by voters. There was also a non-binding advisory question on the ballot for the Spring general election regarding welfare, which was also approved.

A lawsuit alleged that the Republican legislature had missed the deadline for these questions to appear on the April ballot, but the questions were allowed to proceed.

==== Question 1 ====
Question 1
- April 4, 2023

Results
Choice	Votes	%
Yes	1,163,303	66.55%
No	584,624	33.45%
Total votes	1,747,927	100.00%
- County results Yes: 70–80% 60–70% 50–60%

For Question 1, a "yes" vote would raise the conditions necessary for release, removing the word "bodily" from the phrase "All persons, before conviction, shall be eligible for release under reasonable conditions designed to ... protect members of the community from serious bodily harm".

==== Question 2 ====
Question 2
- April 4, 2023

Results
Choice	Votes	%
Yes	1,186,025	67.57%
No	569,286	32.43%
Total votes	1,755,311	100.00%
- County results Yes: 70–80% 60–70% 50–60%

For Question 2, a "yes" vote would insert an additional paragraph allowing judges wider latitude for when to apply cash bail for people accused of violent crimes. The current language of the constitution allows imposition of cash bail only in situations where it is believed "necessary to assure appearance in court." The amendment would allow judges to impose cash bail (on those accused of a violent crime) based on the "totality of the circumstances".

==== Question 3 ====
Question 3
- April 4, 2023

Results
Choice	Votes	%
Yes	1,417,035	79.57%
No	363,941	20.43%
Total votes	1,780,976	100.00%
- County results Yes: >90% 80–90% 70–80% 60–70%

The legislature poses the question "Shall able-bodied, childless adults be required to look for work in order to receive taxpayer-funded welfare benefits?" The results of the referendum had no legal effect, and Wisconsin law already has work requirements for all welfare programs in the state. Voters approved this advisory referendum.

== Local elections ==
=== Brown County ===
==== Green Bay mayor ====
A regularly scheduled mayoral election was held in Green Bay, Wisconsin, concurrent with the Spring general election. First-term incumbent Democrat Eric Genrich defeated a challenge from Republican former state representative Chad Weininger to win a second four-year term.

==== Howard village president ====
A regularly scheduled election for village president was held in Howard, Wisconsin, concurrent with the Spring general election. Incumbent Burt McIntyre defeated IT professional J. D. Kopp in the April general election.

=== Dane County ===
==== Fitchburg mayor ====
A regularly scheduled mayoral election was held in Fitchburg, Wisconsin, concurrent with the Spring general election. Incumbent mayor Aaron Richardson declined to seek re-election to a third term after unsuccessfully running for State Treasurer. Only two candidates filed to run for the office, removing the need for a primary. District 2 Alderperson Julia Arata-Fratta defeated fellow Alderperson and Common Council president Randy Udell by 4 points in the general election.

==== Madison mayor ====
A regularly scheduled mayoral election was held in Madison, Wisconsin, concurrent with the Spring general election. First-term incumbent mayor Satya Rhodes-Conway defeated former deputy mayor and Madison Metropolitan School District School Board President Gloria Reyes in the general election to win a second four-year term. Scott Kerr, a career city employee of the city of Madison, was eliminated in the primary. Daniel Howell, a recent University of Wisconsin graduate, missed the filing deadline and ran an unsuccessful write-in campaign in the primary.

==== Middleton mayor ====
A regularly scheduled mayoral election was held in Middleton, Wisconsin, concurrent with the Spring general election. Incumbent mayor Gurdip Brar did not run for a third term. City councilmember Emily Kuhn defeated fellow city councilmember Kathy Olson in the April general election.

=== Outagamie County ===
==== Outagamie County executive ====
A regularly scheduled county executive election was held in Outagamie County, Wisconsin, concurrent with the Spring general election. Three-term incumbent Democrat Tom Nelson defeated former county board member Kevin Sturn in the general election to win a fourth four-year term. County board member Justin Krueger was eliminated in the primary.

=== Racine County ===
==== Racine mayor ====
A regularly scheduled mayoral election was held in Racine, Wisconsin, concurrent with the Spring general election. Incumbent mayor Cory Mason defeated city councilmember Henry Perez in the general election to win a second four-year term. Retirement financial advisor Jim DeMatthew was eliminated in the February primary.

==== Mount Pleasant village board ====
A regularly scheduled village board election was held in Mount Pleasant concurrent with the Spring general election. Incumbent village president Dave DeGroot and his allies on the village board defeated a challenge from a slate of village residents opposed to the Foxconn project, and the handling of that issue by the village government. Incumbent president Dave DeGroot defeated activist Kelly Gallaher. Trustee Nancy Washburn defeated Kim Mahoney, who was a long-time holdout against relocating from the Foxconn site. Trustee John Hewitt defeated Travis Yanke, a project manager at AbbVie. Trustee Ram Bhatia defeated accountant Eric Martinez.

=== Winnebago County ===
==== Oshkosh mayor ====
A regularly scheduled mayoral election was held in Oshkosh, Wisconsin, concurrent with the Spring general election. Incumbent mayor Lori Palmeri did not run for re-election, after being elected to the Wisconsin State Assembly in 2022. Deputy mayor Matt Mugerauer defeated fellow city councilmember Aaron Wojciechowski in the general election.
