= Scott Krug =

American politician and legislator

Member of the Wisconsin State Assembly from the 72nd district
- Incumbent
- Assumed office January 3, 2011
- Preceded by: Marlin D. Schneider

Personal details
- Born: September 16, 1975 (age 51) Wisconsin Rapids, U.S.
- Party: Republican
- Children: 6
- Education: University of Wisconsin–Stevens Point (attended); Mid-State Technical College (AA); University of Wisconsin–Green Bay (BAS)
- Occupation: Legislator, realtor
- Website: Official website

Scott Krug (born September 16, 1975) is an American Republican politician and realtor from Rome, Wisconsin. He is a member of the Wisconsin State Assembly, representing Wisconsin's 72nd Assembly district since 2011.

== Early life and career ==
Krug was born on September 16, 1975 in Wisconsin Rapids. During his childhood he attended school in Wisconsin Rapids, graduating from Lincoln High School in 1993. He then began attending Mid-State Technical College, graduating in 1999.

Shortly after graduating, he moved to Mauston, Wisconsin, to work for the Juneau County Sheriff's office. Later he moved back to Wisconsin Rapids to work at the Wood County jail as a discharge planner, where he worked to reduce recidivism rates.

In 2008, Krug received a degree in psychology from the University of Wisconsin–Green Bay.

Since 2018, Krug has been an agent at NextHome Partners, a real estate brokerage based in Wisconsin Rapids.

== Political career ==
Krug announced his first bid for public office in 2010, running against longtime Democratic representative Marlin Schneider. In the primary he faced Republicans John Minarcin and John J. Lamb, defeating the former by a close 123 votes. During the election Krug faced Schneider, as well as former Democrat-turned Independent Thad Kubisiak, who had run against Schneider in the 2008 primary. During his campaign, Krug announced that he would only seek two terms before retiring, as well as promising to not colllect any per diem payments from the state legislature. Krug ultimately defeated Schneider by a five-point margin. It was speculated that Kubisiak's high margin in the election, roughly 12% of the vote, contributed to Krug's victory as Schneider or Krug attained a majority of the vote.

In February 2012, Krug proposed legalizing Bail bondsmen for the first time since 1979. His proposal would have allowed defendants to pay 10% of their bonds to bondsmen to get out of jail, as well as given individuals not associated with law enforcement to apprehend fugitives.

In the 2012 election, Krug faced Democrat Justin D. Pluess in what was seen as a potentially close race, as the seat was then-strongly Democratic. During the campaign, Krug, alongside other Republicans, signed on to a questionnaire for the Campaign for Liberty which called for the arrest of federal officials who enforced the Affordable Care Act in the state. Krug supported a theory that states had the ability to nullify federal laws. Krug defeated Pluess by a close 109 votes.

In 2013, Krug came out in support of rehabilitative justice, being described as sounding like a progressive Democrat on the issue. At the start of the session, Krug had hoped to put forward legislation that would move nonviolent offenders from prison into rehabilitative programs. Justifying his position, he put the issue in terms of conservative politics, pointing out how rehabilitative programs save money and reintegrate people into their communities.

In May 2013, Krug signed on to opposition to governor Scott Walker's 2013–15 budget, arguing that rural schools needed more state funding to continue operating. Throughout 2013, Krug began collecting roughly $10,560 in per diem payments from the state legislature, going against one of his major campaign promises made in 2010.

In 2014 Democrats again hoped to unseat Krug, citing the district's historic partisan lean and previous two close races. Krug announced he would seek a third term, breaking his previous pledge to only serve two terms. Krug faced attorney Dana Duncan. During the campaign, one key issue that emerged was over the establishment of Concentrated animal feeding operations. Duncan criticized Krug for not opposing the creation of a new CAFO in his district, while Krug stressed the need for compromise on the issue. Earlier in the year, Krug had opposed the construction of a CAFO at Saratoga, Wisconsin, citing high levels of E. coli bacteria in the local lakes. Additionally, Krug and Duncan opposed each other on issues of voter-ID, the status of Act 10, and the state minimum wage. Krug defeated Duncan by an 11-point margin.

In 2015, Krug was one of eleven Republican legislators who joined Democrats in voting against governor Scott Walker's 2015–17 budget over a cut in funding for public schools.

In the 2016 election, Krug defeated retired middle school councelor David Gorski.

In March 2017, Krug proposed a bill to ease restrictions on patients struggling with seizures or terminal illnesses trying to gain access to Cannabidiol oil for medical treatments.

In 2018 Krug ran for re-election running on funding for road construction, maintaining Act 10, and supporting the Foxconn deal. Krug defeated Gorski in a rematch of 2016.

In 2020, Krug defeated Democrat and former educator Criste Greening.

In 2022, Krug defeated Greening in a rematch from 2020.

Following the 2022 elections, Krug was nominated to chair the Assembly Committee on Campaigns and Elections after the previous chair, Janel Brandtjen was barred from attending closed caucus meetings. Under Krug's leadership, the committee built a record for hearing election legislation on a bipartisan basis, compared to under Brandtjen's leadership, when the committee platformed conspiracy theorists who pushed false claims of election fraud. Additionally, Krug used his position as chair to push back against election conspiracy theories and encourage civility on discourse surrounding elections.

In June 2023, the committee, under Krug's leadership, held hearings on four bipartisan election bills, ranging from preventing polling place closures, broadcasting election-night proceedings, funding special elections, and requiring voter-ID for military absentee voters. In the next meeting of the committee, Krug held hearings on a bipartisan bill to further penalize those who harm election officials.

In June 2024, Krug requested that the Wisconsin Department of Transportation give his committee access to citizenship information for people with state IDs and driver’s licenses. Throughout the summer, Krug was repeatedly unable to gain access to the data, with the DOT arguing that the data was unreliable and could not be effectively used to check for noncitizen voting, which is illegal in the state.

In 2024, following the legislative redistricting, Krug's district was redrawn, shifting west and losing parts of Portage County and all of Waushara County, while gaining parts of Juneau and Wood Counties. In the 2024 election, he was re-elected to an eighth term, defeating Democrat Suzanne M. Campbell.

In January 2025, Krug was elected by the Republican caucus to be Assistant Majority leader under speaker Robin Vos and Majority leader Tyler August. As a result of being selected to be Assistant Majority leader, Krug became the vice-chair of the Assembly Committee on Campaigns and Elections, being succeeded as chair by fellow Republican Dave Maxey. In September 2025, Krug once again proposed legislation that would allow poll workers process absentee ballots the Monday before an election. At the same time, Krug tied the proposal to other conservative-backed measures including regulating ballot drop boxes and banning election clerks from fixing errors on ballots, in a hope to make the measure more likely to pass. Due to Republican disagreements on Krug's bill, the proposal faced opposition from committee chair Maxey and representative Lindee Brill, who stripped the early processing and drop box proposals from the legislation in November. Krug's legislative package also faced pushback from Assembly Democrats, who criticized the proposal for being "poisoned" by including conservative-backed proposals. In December 2025, Krug, alongside state senator Patrick Testin proposed a bill that would allow for communities to set up small scale solar-power projects, also known as solar gardens, independently of electric utility companies.

== Electoral history ==
=== Wisconsin Assembly (2010–present) ===
Year	Election	Date	Elected				Defeated				Total	Plurality
2010	Primary	Sep. 14	Scott S. Krug	Republican	1,753	35.26%	John Minarcin	Rep.	1,630	32.78%	4,972	123
2010	Primary	Sep. 14	Scott S. Krug	Republican	1,753	35.26%	John J. Lamb	Rep.	1,586	31.90%	4,972	123
2010	General	Nov. 2	Scott S. Krug	Republican	9,501	46.56%	Marlin Schneider (inc)	Dem.	8,432	41.32%	20,407	1,069
2010	General	Nov. 2	Scott S. Krug	Republican	9,501	46.56%	Thad Kubisiak	Ind.	2,465	12.08%	20,407	1,069
2012	General	Nov. 6	Scott S. Krug (inc)	Republican	14,138	50.16%	Justin D. Pluess	Dem.	14,029	49.77%	28,185	109
2014	General	Nov. 4	Scott S. Krug (inc)	Republican	13,113	55.95%	Dana W. Duncan	Dem.	10,317	44.02%	23,437	2,796
2016	General	Nov. 8	Scott S. Krug (inc)	Republican	15,972	56.52%	David Gorski	Dem.	12,279	43.45%	28,257	3,693
2018	General	Nov. 6	Scott S. Krug (inc)	Republican	14,773	57.32%	David Gorski	Dem.	10,992	42.65%	25,773	3,781
2020	General	Nov. 3	Scott S. Krug (inc)	Republican	19,208	60.31%	Criste Greening	Dem.	12,623	39.63%	31,851	6,585
2022	General	Nov. 8	Scott S. Krug (inc)	Republican	16,473	62.14%	Criste Greening	Dem.	10,027	37.82%	26,511	6,446
2024	General	Nov. 5	Scott S. Krug (inc)	Republican	21,993	63.89%	Suzanne M. Campbell	Dem.	12,407	36.05%	34,421	9,586
