= 2011 Wisconsin elections =

- April 5, 2011

The 2011 Wisconsin Spring Election was held in the U.S. state of Wisconsin on April 5, 2011. The featured race at the top of the ticket was a seat on the Wisconsin Supreme Court, which was seen as an early referendum on the policies of the newly inaugurated governor, Scott Walker. Several other nonpartisan local and judicial offices were also decided on the April ballot, including mayoral elections in some of Wisconsin's larger cities—Green Bay, Madison, and Racine. Republicans' preferred candidate, incumbent justice David Prosser Jr., won the Supreme Court election by a narrow margin that resulted in a contentious recount. The 2011 Wisconsin Spring Primary was held February 15, 2011.

2011 also saw the first set of recall elections incited by Governor Scott Walker's controversial 2011 Wisconsin Act 10, which stripped public employee unions of their collective bargaining rights. Nine state senators faced recall in the Summer of 2011, with two Republican seats flipping to Democratic control.

Five special legislative elections were also held in 2011 to fill vacancies in the Wisconsin State Assembly.

== State offices ==
=== Legislature ===
==== State Senate recall ====
Nine Wisconsin state senators were subjects of coordinated recall efforts to remove them from office in the Summer of 2011. The first recall election was held on July 19, six were held on August 9, and two more were held on August 16. Two incumbents, Randy Hopper and Dan Kapanke, were defeated in the recall. The net result was that Democrats reduced the Republican Senate majority to 17–16.

==== State Assembly 60th district special election ====
A special election was held in Wisconsin's 60th Assembly district on May 3, 2011, to fill the vacancy caused by the resignation of Mark Gottlieb to become secretary of the Wisconsin Department of Transportation. The Republican nominee, Cedarburg school board member Duey Stroebel, defeated the Democratic nominee, Rick Aaron.

A special primary was held concurrent with the Spring general election, April 5, 2011. In the Republican primary, Stroebel narrowly prevailed over Cedarburg town supervisor Gary Wickert and a field of five other candidates, including Paul Melotik.

==== State Assembly 83rd district special election ====
A special election was held in Wisconsin's 83rd Assembly district on May 3, 2011, to fill the vacancy caused by the resignation of Scott Gunderson to accept a job at the Wisconsin Department of Natural Resources. The Republican nominee, Dave Craig, defeated Democratic nominee James Brownlow.

==== State Assembly 94th district special election ====
A special election was held in Wisconsin's 94th Assembly district on May 3, 2011, to fill the vacancy caused by the resignation of Michael Huebsch to become secretary of the Wisconsin Department of Administration. The Democratic nominee, La Crosse County board chairman Steve Doyle, defeated Republican nominee John Lautz. This was a net gain for the Democrats.

A special primary was held concurrent with the Spring general election, April 5, 2011. In the Democratic primary, Doyle won a close election over American Red Cross executive director Cheryl Hancock. In the Republican primary, Lautz defeated four other candidates.

==== State Assembly 48th district special election ====
A special election was held in Wisconsin's 48th Assembly district on August 9, 2011, to fill the vacancy caused by the resignation of Joe Parisi to become Dane County executive. The Democratic nominee, Planned Parenthood executive Chris Taylor won the special election without opposition.

A special primary was held on July 12, 2011, in which Taylor defeated five opponents.

==== State Assembly 95th district special election ====
A special election was held in Wisconsin's 95th Assembly district on November 8, 2011, to fill the vacancy caused by the resignation of Jennifer Shilling, who had been elected state senator in a recall. The Democratic nominee, La Crosse County supervisor Jill Billings, defeated Republican nominee David A. Drewes.

A special primary was held on October 11, 2011, in which Billings defeated three opponents.

=== Judicial ===
==== State Supreme Court ====
A regularly scheduled Wisconsin Supreme Court election was held on April 5, 2011. The incumbent judge David Prosser Jr., first appointed by Governor Tommy Thompson in 1998, won his second ten-year term, defeating assistant attorney general Joanne Kloppenburg. His victory preserved the 4–3 conservative majority on the court.

On election night, Kloppenburg appeared to have won a narrow victory, but during a recount, the Waukesha County clerk discovered 14,000 missing votes from the city of Brookfield, which broke heavily in favor of Prosser.

Wisconsin Supreme Court Election, 2011
Party	Candidate	Votes	%	±%
Nonpartisan Primary, February 15, 2011
Nonpartisan	David Prosser Jr. (incumbent)	231,017	54.99%	
Nonpartisan	Joanne Kloppenburg	105,002	24.99%	
Nonpartisan	Marla Stephens	45,256	10.77%	
Nonpartisan	Joel Winnig	37,831	9.01%	
	Scattering	1,004	0.24%	
Total votes		420,110	100.0%	
General Election, April 5, 2011 (post-recount)
Nonpartisan	David Prosser Jr. (incumbent)	752,694	50.23%	
Nonpartisan	Joanne Kloppenburg	745,690	49.77%	
	Scattering	1,729	0.12%	
Plurality		7,004	0.47%	
Total votes		1,500,113	100.0%	

==== State Court of Appeals ====
Two seats on the Wisconsin Court of Appeals were up for election on April 5, 2011.

- In District III, incumbent judge Gregory A. Peterson, first elected in 1999, won his third six-year term without opposition.
- In District IV, incumbent judge Paul B. Higginbotham, appointed by Governor Jim Doyle in 2003, won his second six-year term without opposition.

==== State Circuit Courts ====
Forty one of the state's 249 circuit court seats were up for election in 2011. Nine of those seats were contested, four incumbent judges faced a contested election and one was defeated.

== Local offices ==
=== Brown County ===
==== Green Bay mayor ====
- A regularly scheduled mayoral election was held in Green Bay, Wisconsin, concurrent with the Spring general election, April 5, 2011. Incumbent mayor Jim Schmitt, first elected in 2003, won his third four-year term, defeating county supervisor Patrick Evans.

=== Dane County ===
==== Madison mayor ====
A regularly scheduled mayoral election was held in Madison, Wisconsin, concurrent with the Spring general election, April 5, 2011. Former mayor Paul Soglin narrowly defeated the incumbent mayor, Dave Cieslewicz. This was Soglin's seventh term as mayor, but only his second four-year term.

=== Milwaukee County ===
==== Milwaukee County executive ====
A special election for county executive was held in Milwaukee County, Wisconsin, concurrent with the Spring general election, April 5, 2011, due to early resignation of executive Scott Walker, who had been elected governor. Milwaukee businessman Chris Abele won the special election to serve the remainder of the term expiring April 2012. Abele defeated Republican state representative Jeff Stone; three other candidates were eliminated in the nonpartisan primary: former Democratic state senator Jim Sullivan, interim county executive Lee Holloway, and local activist Ieshuh Griffin.

=== Outagamie County ===
==== Outagamie County executive ====
A regularly scheduled county executive election was held in Outagamie County, Wisconsin, concurrent with the Spring general election, April 5, 2011. The incumbent executive, Toby Paltzer, did not run for re-election. Former Assembly majority leader Tom Nelson was elected county executive, defeating former state treasurer Jack Voight.

=== Racine County ===
==== Racine mayor ====
A regularly scheduled mayoral election was held in Racine, Wisconsin, concurrent with the Spring general election, April 5, 2011. Incumbent mayor John Dickert, first elected in a 2009 special election, won his first full four-year term. He defeated city councilmember Eric Marcus.
