= Jodi Habush Sinykin =

21st century American politician

Member of the Wisconsin Senate from the 8th district
- Incumbent
- Assumed office January 6, 2025
- Preceded by: Dan Knodl

Personal details
- Born: Jodi Lynn Habush; May 1967 (age 59)
- Party: Democratic
- Spouse: Daniel Lorie Sinykin (m. 1992)
- Children: 4
- Education: University of Michigan; Harvard Law School (JD)
- Profession: Lawyer, politician
- Website: Official website; Campaign website

Jodi Habush Sinykin (born Jodi Lynn Habush; May 1967) is an American lawyer and Democratic politician from Milwaukee County, Wisconsin. She is a member of the Wisconsin Senate, representing Wisconsin's 8th Senate district since 2025.

== Early life and career ==
Jodi Habush Sinykin was born Jodi Lynn Habush in May 1967. She was raised in Fox Point, Wisconsin, graduating from Nicolet High School in Glendale, Wisconsin, in 1985. She went on to attend the University of Michigan, earning her bachelor's degree with honors in 1989. Sinykin attended Harvard Law School, obtaining her J.D. in 1992.

After law school, she resided for a short time in Chicago and clerked for a federal district court judge. In 1995, she and her husband, Dan Sinykin, purchased Roller Fabrics, a textile manufacturer, and moved back to Milwaukee. They continued to expand that business, acquiring Monterey Mills in Janesville, Wisconsin, in 2005. During that decade, Sinykin worked in private legal practice, but later joined her father's law firm, Habush Habush & Rottier S.C.

== Political career ==
Sinykin joined Midwest Environmental Advocates in 2003, using her legal background to lobby the state legislature on environmental issues and water law. A few years later, she was asked to represent Wisconsin Groundwater Advisory Committee and the Wisconsin Legislative Council's Special Committee on the Great Lakes Compact in the efforts to negotiate and ratify the Great Lakes Compact.

After the passage of the Compact, Sinykin managed a number of lawsuits against state and local governments over environmental issues. In 2014 she received statewide attention for a lawsuit against the state to stop the use of dogs for wolf hunting. After a defeat at the Wisconsin Court of Appeals, she turned to lobbying efforts and played an important role in winning passage of Wisconsin's puppy mill legislation, which dealt with some of the same issues.

Following the announcement of the Foxconn in Wisconsin project, Sinykin was involved in litigation over the project's plan to divert a large volume of Lake Michigan water to the facility in an apparent violation of the Great Lakes Compact. Foxconn eventually committed to cut back their planned water usage.

Sinykin made her first bid for elected office in 2023, following the early resignation of state senator Alberta Darling. Darling's resignation from the 8th Senate district left Republicans one seat short of a supermajority in the upper chamber of the Wisconsin Legislature and necessitated a Spring special election. At the time, the 8th Senate district stretched from Sinykin's home region in Milwaukee's northern suburbs, into the southern half of Ozaukee County, to much of southern Washington County and part of northeast Waukesha County. The district contained a large volume of traditionally Republican suburbs which had been trending toward Democrats since the election of Donald Trump in 2016. Sinykin faced no opponent in the Democratic primary. In the special election, she faced Republican state representative Dan Knodl of Germantown, Wisconsin. Sinykin based much of her campaign messaging on defending abortion rights in Wisconsin following the U.S. Supreme Court's Dobbs v. Jackson Women's Health Organization decision enabling unlimited state restriction on abortion access. After a brief but hard-fought race, Knodl prevailed by just 1.7% of the vote.

Although Sinykin lost the election, on the same day the election of Judge Janet Protasiewicz to the Wisconsin Supreme Court flipped the ideological balance of that court and allowed the liberals on the court, later that year, to strike down the decade-old Republican legislative gerrymander. After the Wisconsin Supreme Court's redistricting decision, Republicans in the legislature opted to accept a remedial plan proposed by Democratic governor Tony Evers, which was enacted in February 2024. Under the new plan, the 8th Senate district was slightly adjusted, removing some areas of Washington and Waukesha counties and adding more of Ozaukee, including Democratic-tilting Port Washington. The new map also drew Dan Knodl into an incumbent vs incumbent matchup against fellow Republican senator Duey Stroebel. Although the new 8th district mostly contained territory and population that had been part of Knodl's former district, he declined to run against Stroebel, who had served in the legislature since 2011.

Sinykin announced she would run for Senate again under the new maps. Again, she faced no Democratic opposition. Again, the 8th district drew significant attention from both parties and became the most competitive Senate election in the state. Sinykin ultimately prevailed by just 1.4% of the vote. She took office on January 6, 2025.

== Personal life and family ==
Jodi Habush Sinykin is the youngest daughter of Mimi and Robert Habush. Robert Habush took over the law firm founded by his father, now known as Habush Habush & Rottier S.C., and expanded it into one of the largest law firms in the state.

Jodi Habush took the last name Sinykin when she married Daniel Lorie Sinykin in 1992. Sinykin was a successful salesman at Procter & Gamble before he and Jodi took over Roller Fabrics in 1995. He continues to serve as president and C.E.O. of Monterey Mills. They have four adult children and reside in Whitefish Bay, Wisconsin.

== Electoral history ==
=== Wisconsin Senate (2023, 2024) ===
Year	Election	Date	Elected				Defeated				Total	Plurality
2023	Special	Apr. 4	Dan Knodl	Republican	38,492	50.81%	Jodi Habush Sinykin	Dem.	37,200	49.11%	75,751	1,292
2024	General	Nov. 5	Jodi Habush Sinykin	Democratic	60,471	50.68%	Duey Stroebel	Rep.	58,686	49.18%	119,317	1,785

Wisconsin Senate
Preceded by Dan Knodl	Member of the Wisconsin Senate from the 4th district January 6, 2025 – present	Incumbent
