= Paul Melotik =

21st century American politician

Member of the Wisconsin State Assembly
- Incumbent
- Assumed office January 6, 2025
- Preceded by: Janel Brandtjen
- Constituency: 22nd district
- In office August 7, 2023 – January 6, 2025
- Preceded by: Dan Knodl
- Succeeded by: Dan Knodl
- Constituency: 24th district

Member of the Board of Supervisors of Ozaukee County, Wisconsin from the 10th district
- In office April 2012 – April 2024
- Preceded by: Raymond G. Meyer II
- Succeeded by: Dan Vogel

Personal details
- Born: February 27, 1957 (age 69) Milwaukee, Wisconsin, U.S.
- Party: Republican
- Spouse: Wendy
- Children: 4
- Education: Carroll University (BA)
- Occupation: Accountant, bar owner
- Website: Official website

Paul D. Melotik (born February 27, 1957) is an American accountant, businessman, and Republican politician from Ozaukee County, Wisconsin. He is a member of the Wisconsin State Assembly, representing Wisconsin's 22nd Assembly district since 2025; he previously represented the 24th Assembly district from August 2023 to January 2025. He also previously served as a member of the Ozaukee County Board of Supervisors, representing most of the town of Grafton.

== Early life and career ==
Melotik was born in Milwaukee, Wisconsin, and graduated from Nathan Hale High School in West Allis, Wisconsin. He went on to attend Carroll University, in Waukesha, Wisconsin, where he earned his bachelor's degree in accounting and business management in 1979.

He worked for several years as an accountant for Wisconsin Electric and then went into the bar and restaurant business. He is now co-owner of Flannery's Bar & Restaurant at the Fire Ridge Golf Course in Grafton.

Melotik previously operated another Flannery's Bar location in Milwaukee, which has since closed. During that time he was also president of Water Street Tavern and Restaurant Association.

Melotik made his first run for state office in 2002, when he ran for Wisconsin State Assembly in what was then the 60th Assembly district, but he lost in the Republican primary to Mark Gottlieb.

Melotik remained involved in politics after his loss. He was elected to the Ozaukee County board of supervisors in 2012, and was then elected to the town board of Grafton in 2017.

== Political career ==
By 2023, the Grafton area—due to redistricting—had moved from the 60th Assembly district to the 24th Assembly district. That year, the incumbent state representative, Dan Knodl, was elected to the Wisconsin Senate and therefore vacated his seat in the Assembly. Melotik announced his campaign to succeed Knodl in the 24th Assembly district and did not face any opposition for the Republican nomination. He went on to defeat the Democratic nominee, Bob Tatterson, in the July 2023 special election, winning 53 percent of the vote.

Shortly after winning his seat in the Assembly, Melotik announced he would step down from the Grafton town board but would remain some time longer on the Ozaukee County board, though he also stated he would not seek re-election to the county board and may resign before the end of that term. Describing unfinished business on the county board, Melotik said he wanted to be involved in discussions of how to spend remaining money from the American Rescue Plan Act of 2021.

== Electoral history ==
=== Wisconsin Assembly, 60th district (2002) ===
Year	Election	Date	Elected				Defeated				Total	Plurality
2002	Primary	Sep. 10	Mark Gottlieb	Republican	2,443	46.00%	Paul Melotik	Rep.	2,041	38.43%	5,311	402
2002	Primary	Sep. 10	Mark Gottlieb	Republican	2,443	46.00%	Ben Pliskie	Rep.	826	15.55%	5,311	402

=== Wisconsin Assembly, 60th district (2011) ===
Year	Election	Date	Elected				Defeated				Total	Plurality
2011 (special)	Special Primary	Apr. 5	Duey Stroebel	Republican	3,125	26.60%	Gary Wickert	Rep.	3,064	26.08%	11,748	61
2011 (special)	Special Primary	Apr. 5	Duey Stroebel	Republican	3,125	26.60%	Paul Melotik	Rep.	2,132	18.15%	11,748	61
2011 (special)	Special Primary	Apr. 5	Duey Stroebel	Republican	3,125	26.60%	Jake Curtis	Rep.	2,076	17.67%	11,748	61
2011 (special)	Special Primary	Apr. 5	Duey Stroebel	Republican	3,125	26.60%	John Soper	Rep.	501	4.26%	11,748	61
2011 (special)	Special Primary	Apr. 5	Duey Stroebel	Republican	3,125	26.60%	Rik Kluessendorf	Rep.	349	2.97%	11,748	61

=== Wisconsin Assembly, 24th district (2023) ===
Year	Election	Date	Elected				Defeated				Total	Plurality
2023 (special)	Special	Jul. 18	Paul Melotik	Republican	6,455	53.68%	Bob Tatterson	Dem.	5,568	46.30%	12,026	887

=== Wisconsin Assembly, 22nd district (2024) ===
Year	Election	Date	Elected				Defeated				Total	Plurality
2024	General	Nov. 5	Paul Melotik	Republican	23,566	58.00%	Dana Glasstein	Dem.	17,014	41.88%	40,628	6,552

Wisconsin State Assembly
Preceded by Dan Knodl	Member of the Wisconsin State Assembly from the 24th district August 7, 2023 – January 6, 2025	Succeeded by Dan Knodl
Preceded by Janel Brandtjen	Member of the Wisconsin State Assembly from the 22nd district January 6, 2025 – present	Incumbent
