= Mark Gottlieb (politician) =

American politician (born 1956)

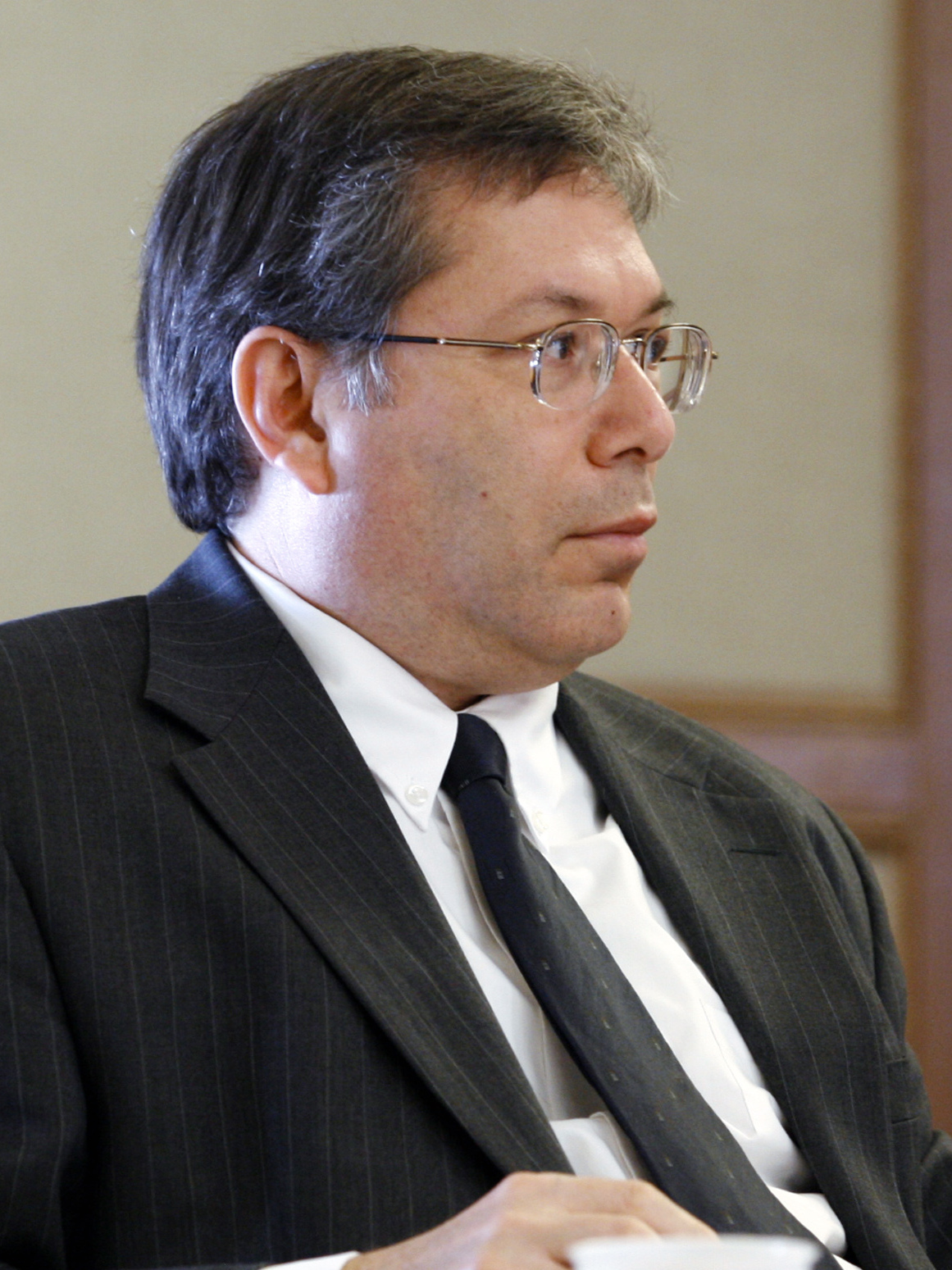
- Gottlieb in 2008

14th Secretary of the Wisconsin Department of Transportation
- In office January 3, 2011 – January 6, 2017
- Governor: Scott Walker
- Preceded by: Frank J. Busalacchi
- Succeeded by: Dave Ross

Member of the Wisconsin State Assembly from the 60th district
- In office January 6, 2003 – January 3, 2011
- Preceded by: Timothy Hoven
- Succeeded by: Duey Stroebel

28th Mayor of Port Washington, Wisconsin
- In office April 1997 – April 2003
- Preceded by: Joe Dean
- Succeeded by: Scott A. Huebner

Personal details
- Born: December 11, 1956 (age 69) Milwaukee, Wisconsin, U.S.
- Party: Republican
- Spouse: Linda Gottlieb
- Children: 4
- Education: University of Wisconsin–Milwaukee (B.S., M.E.)
- Profession: Civil engineer

Military service
- Allegiance: United States
- Branch/service: United States Navy
- Years of service: 1974–1978

Mark Gottlieb (born December 11, 1956) is an American civil engineer and Republican politician from Ozaukee County, Wisconsin. He served as secretary of the Wisconsin Department of Transportation through much of the administration of Governor Scott Walker. He previously served eight years in the Wisconsin State Assembly, representing the 60th Assembly district from 2003 to 2011. He was also mayor of Port Washington, Wisconsin, from 1997 to 2003. After leaving government, he became associate director of the University of Wisconsin–Milwaukee's Institute for Physical Infrastructure and Transportation.

== Early life and education ==
Mark Gottlieb was born in Milwaukee, Wisconsin, on December 11, 1956. He graduated from Milwaukee's James Madison High School in 1974, then served in the United States Navy from 1974 to 1978. After leaving the Navy, he attended the University of Wisconsin–Milwaukee, where he earned his bachelor's degree in civil engineering in 1981, and his master's degree in 1984. During his undergraduate studies in Milwaukee, Gottlieb became involved with the anti-abortion Students for Life and was president of the Milwaukee chapter in 1980.

== Public office ==
Gottlieb first entered public office in 1991, when he was elected to the common council of Port Washington, Wisconsin. He ultimately served six years on the common council before being elected mayor in 1997. A major issue in the mayoral campaign was a city ordnance requiring children to wear helmets while biking. Gottlieb's opponent suggested the ordnance interfered with parental rights, while Gottlieb defended safety regulations. Gottlieb went on to serve six more years as mayor, leaving office in 2003.

In 2002, incumbent state representative Timothy Hoven resigned his seat in the Wisconsin State Assembly, creating a vacancy in the 60th Assembly district. Gottlieb entered the race to succeed him, defeating two opponents in the Republican Party primary. He faced no opposition in the November 2002 general election, and took office in January 2003. He was re-elected without opposition in 2004 and 2006.

He was elected to caucus leadership after the 2004 election, when he was named majority caucus vice chair for the 2005–2006 term. After the 2006 election, he was elected Speaker pro tempore for the 2007–2008 term.

In 2008, Gottlieb faced his only contested general election, defeating Democrat Perry Duman with 70% of the vote. The 2008 election did, however, usher in a Democratic majority in the Assembly. In the new Republican minority, Gottlieb was elected assistant minority leader for the 2009–2010 term. During that term, Gottlieb also served as the ranking member of the Joint Survey Committee on Retirement Systems and a member of the Joint Committee on Legislative Organization. He also served on the Assembly committees on Rules, on Urban and Local Affairs, and on Colleges and Universities.

Gottlieb was elected to a fifth term in the Assembly in 2010, but shortly after the election, he was named to the cabinet of the governor-elect, Scott Walker. Gottlieb was named as Walker's pick to become secretary of the Wisconsin Department of Transportation. Gottlieb resigned from the Assembly on January 3, 2011, to assume that position.

Gottlieb served seven years as head of the Department of Transportation. He announced his resignation on December 27, 2016, taking effect on January 6, 2017. He was replaced by Dave Ross.

== Later years ==
Since leaving government, Gottlieb has worked as associate director of the University of Wisconsin–Milwaukee's Institute for Physical Infrastructure and Transportation.

== Personal life and family ==
Mark Gottlieb and his wife, Linda, have four children.

== Electoral history ==
=== Wisconsin Assembly (2002–2010) ===
Year	Election	Date	Elected				Defeated				Total	Plurality
2002	Primary	Sep. 10	Mark Gottlieb	Republican	2,443	46.00%	Paul Melotik	Rep.	2,041	38.43%	5,311	402
2002	Primary	Sep. 10	Mark Gottlieb	Republican	2,443	46.00%	Ben Pliskie	Rep.	826	15.55%	5,311	402
2002	General	Nov. 5	Mark Gottlieb	Republican	16,223	98.59%	--unopposed--				16,455	15,991
2004	General	Nov. 2	Mark Gottlieb (inc)	Republican	24,300	99.60%	--unopposed--				24,398	24,202
2006	General	Nov. 7	Mark Gottlieb (inc)	Republican	19,466	99.14%	--unopposed--				19,635	19,297
2008	General	Nov. 4	Mark Gottlieb (inc)	Republican	23,282	70.29%	Perry Duman	Dem.	9,821	29.65%	33,121	13,461
2010	General	Nov. 2	Mark Gottlieb (inc)	Republican	21,896	99.23%	--unopposed--				22,067	21,725

Wisconsin State Assembly
Preceded by Timothy Hoven	Member of the Wisconsin State Assembly from the 60th district January 6, 2003 – January 3, 2011	Succeeded by Duey Stroebel
Government offices
Preceded by Frank J. Busalacchi	Secretary of the Wisconsin Department of Transportation; January 3, 2011 – January 6, 2017	Succeeded by Dave Ross
