= Dan Knodl =

21st century American politician

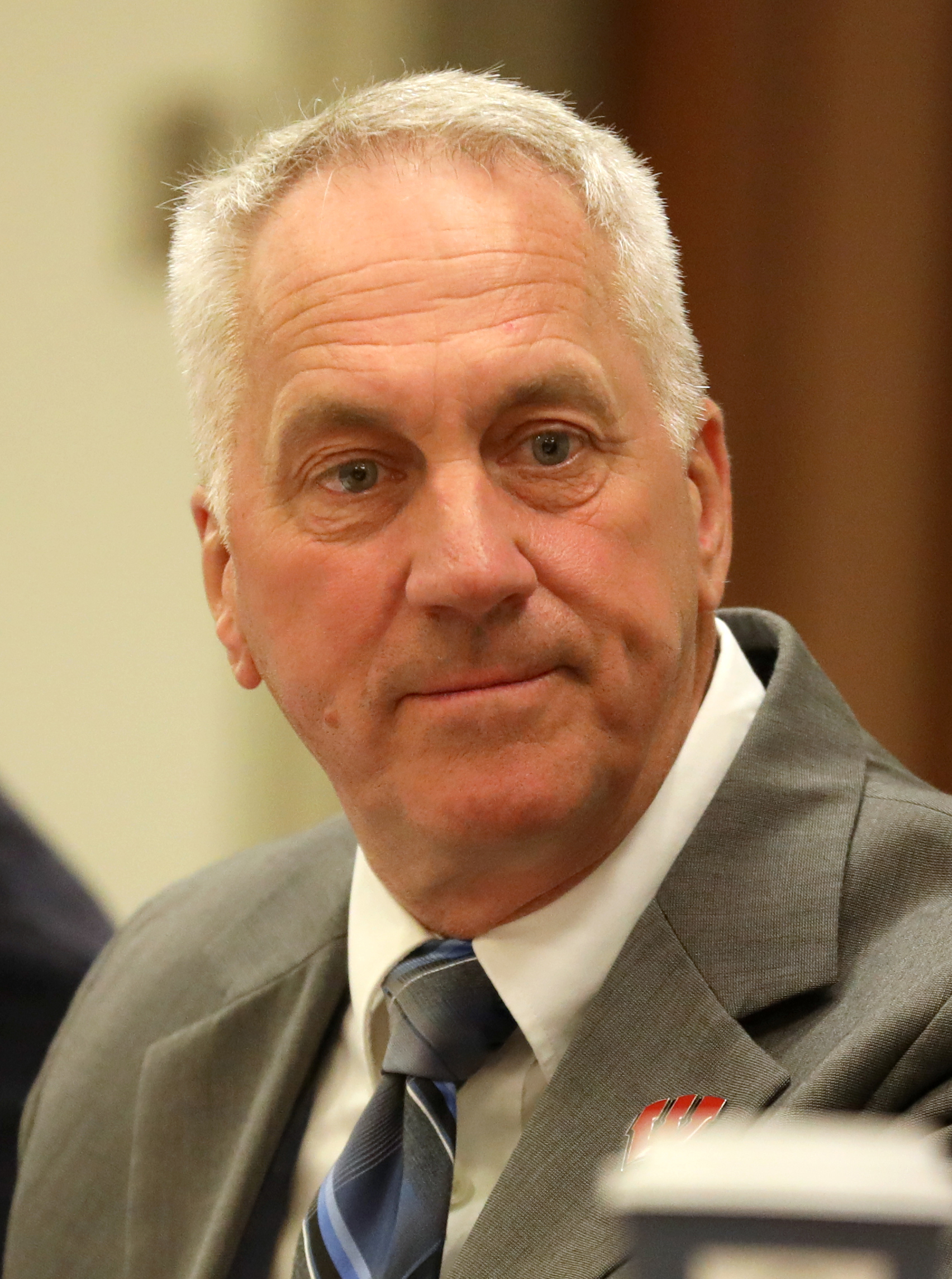

Member of the Wisconsin Senate from the 8th district
- In office May 3, 2023 – January 6, 2025
- Preceded by: Alberta Darling
- Succeeded by: Jodi Habush Sinykin

Member of the Wisconsin State Assembly from the 24th district
- Incumbent
- Assumed office January 6, 2025
- Preceded by: Paul Melotik
- In office January 5, 2009 – May 3, 2023
- Preceded by: Suzanne Jeskewitz
- Succeeded by: Paul Melotik

Personal details
- Born: December 14, 1958 (age 67) Milwaukee, Wisconsin, U.S.
- Party: Republican
- Spouse: Diana Maria Bertieri (div. 2003)

Daniel Raymond Knodl (born December 14, 1958) is an American Republican politician from Washington County, Wisconsin. He is a member of the Wisconsin State Assembly, representing Wisconsin's 24th Assembly district since January 2025. Knodl previously represented this district from January 2009 until May 2023, when he was elected to the Wisconsin Senate in a 2023 special election to represent the 8th State Senate district.

== Early life and education ==
Born in Milwaukee, Knodl was raised in Menomonee Falls, Wisconsin, and graduated from Menomonee Falls East High School in 1977. He briefly attended the University of Wisconsin–Madison.

== Career ==
Knodl was first elected to the Washington County board of supervisors in 2006. Two years later, he won his first term in the Wisconsin State Assembly, running in the 24th Assembly district. He went on to win re-election seven times in this district.

On January 5, 2021, Knodl and 14 other Wisconsin lawmakers signed a letter to Vice President Mike Pence asking him to delay certification of the 2020 United States presidential election. In the letter, they claimed that "The 2020 election witnessed an unprecedented and admitted defiance of state law and procedural irregularities raising questions about the validity of hundreds of thousands of ballots."

On December 2, 2022, Knodl announced that he was running in the special election for the 8th state senate district after incumbent Alberta Darling resigned. On February 21, 2023, Knodl beat Janel Brandtjen and Van Mobley in the Republican primary race. He defeated Democrat Jodi Habush Sinykin on April 4. Knodl was sworn in as a state senator on May 3, 2023.

A year after his election, however, the 2024 redistricting act re-drew the 8th Senate district so that Knodl and fellow senator Duey Stroebel were contained in one district. He announced he would not seek re-election to the Senate, and instead opted to run for his old seat in the 24th Assembly district.

== Electoral history ==
=== Wisconsin Assembly (2008–2022) ===
Year	Election	Date	Elected				Defeated				Total	Plurality
2008	Primary	Sep. 9	Dan Knodl	Republican	2,706	37.41%	Jason LaSage	Rep.	2,312	31.96%	7,234	394
2008	Primary	Sep. 9	Dan Knodl	Republican	2,706	37.41%	Randall Ryan Melchert	Rep.	1,995	27.58%	7,234	394
2008	Primary	Sep. 9	Dan Knodl	Republican	2,706	37.41%	Michael Moscicke	Rep.	215	2.97%	7,234	394
2008	General	Nov. 4	Dan Knodl	Republican	20,510	61.88%	Charlene S. Brady	Dem.	12,561	37.90%	33,145	7,949
2010	General	Nov. 2	Dan Knodl (inc)	Republican	20,488	74.74%	Dustin James Klein	Dem.	6,910	25.21%	27,414	13,578
2012	General	Nov. 6	Dan Knodl (inc)	Republican	20,932	62.37%	Shan Haqqi	Dem.	12,594	37.53%	33,559	8,338
2014	General	Nov. 4	Dan Knodl (inc)	Republican	21,818	97.06%	--Unopposed--				22,479	21,157
2016	General	Nov. 8	Dan Knodl (inc)	Republican	24,047	96.48%	--Unopposed--				24,925	23,169
2018	General	Nov. 6	Dan Knodl (inc)	Republican	17,650	53.64%	Emily Siegrist	Dem.	15,244	46.33%	32,906	2,406
2020	General	Nov. 3	Dan Knodl (inc)	Republican	20,075	51.45%	Emily Siegrist	Dem.	18,924	48.50%	39,019	1,151
2022	General	Nov. 8	Dan Knodl (inc)	Republican	19,397	61.14%	Bob Tatterson	Dem.	12,311	38.81%	31,725	7,086

=== Wisconsin Senate (2023) ===
Year	Election	Date	Elected				Defeated				Total	Plurality
2023 (special)	Primary	Feb. 21	Dan Knodl	Republican	13,996	56.82%	Janel Brandtjen	Rep.	6,870	27.89%	24,634	7,126
2023 (special)	Primary	Feb. 21	Dan Knodl	Republican	13,996	56.82%	Van Mobley	Rep.	3,743	15.19%	24,634	7,126
2023 (special)	Special	Apr. 4	Dan Knodl	Republican	38,492	50.81%	Jodi Habush Sinykin	Dem.	37,200	49.11%	75,751	1,292

=== Wisconsin Assembly (2024) ===
Year	Election	Date	Elected				Defeated				Total	Plurality
2024	Primary	Aug. 13	Dan Knodl	Republican	6,870	64.90%	Janel Brandtjen	Rep.	3,692	34.88%	10,585	3,178
2024	General	Nov. 5	Dan Knodl	Republican	23,858	59.94%	William Walter	Dem.	15,887	39.91%	39,806	7,971

Wisconsin State Assembly
Preceded by Suzanne Jeskewitz	Member of the Wisconsin State Assembly from the 24th district January 5, 2009 – May 3, 2023	Succeeded by Paul Melotik
Preceded by Paul Melotik	Member of the Wisconsin State Assembly from the 24th district January 6, 2025 – present	Incumbent
Wisconsin Senate
Preceded by Alberta Darling	Member of the Wisconsin Senate from the 8th district May 3, 2023 – January 6, 2025	Succeeded by Jodi Habush Sinykin
