= Tyler August =

American politician (born 1983)

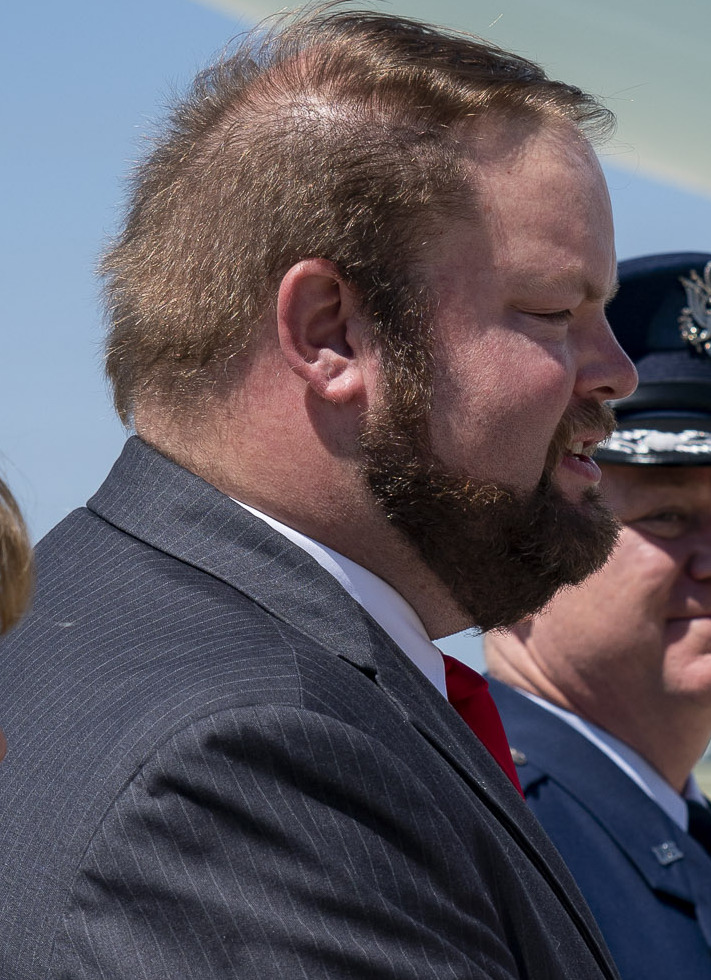

Majority Leader of the Wisconsin State Assembly
- Incumbent
- Assumed office January 3, 2023
- Preceded by: Jim Steineke

Speaker pro tempore of the Wisconsin State Assembly
- In office October 8, 2013 – January 3, 2023
- Preceded by: Bill Kramer
- Succeeded by: Kevin Petersen

Member of the Wisconsin State Assembly
- Incumbent
- Assumed office January 6, 2025
- Preceded by: Ellen Schutt
- Constituency: 31st district
- In office January 3, 2011 – January 6, 2025
- Preceded by: Thomas Lothian
- Succeeded by: Amanda Nedweski
- Constituency: 32nd district

Personal details
- Born: January 26, 1983 (age 43) Walworth County, Wisconsin, U.S.
- Party: Republican
- Education: University of Wisconsin, Eau Claire (attended); University of Wisconsin, Madison (attended)
- Website: Legislative website Official Twitter

Tyler August (born January 26, 1983) is an American Republican politician from Walworth County, Wisconsin. He is the majority leader of the Wisconsin State Assembly since 2023 and previously served as the chamber's speaker pro tempore. He represents Wisconsin's 31st Assembly district since 2025 and previously represented the 32nd Assembly district from 2011 to 2025.

== Early life and education ==
Born in Walworth County, Wisconsin, August graduated from Big Foot High School, in Walworth, Wisconsin, in 2001. He attended the University of Wisconsin–Eau Claire and the University of Wisconsin–Madison, but did not obtain a degree. He completed a leadership program at the University of Virginia's Darden School of Business in 2012.

== Career ==
August first became active in state government by working on the staff of state representative Thomas Lothian, his predecessor in the Assembly, and is now a full-time legislator. He has been active with the Republican Party of Wisconsin, serving on the executive board of the state party, as well as serving as Chair for the Republican Party in Walworth County and in Wisconsin's 1st congressional district. He is also a lifetime member of the National Rifle Association of America.

=== 2010 election ===
August was first elected to the Assembly in 2010, where his main challenge was the hotly contested six-way Republican primary. On the night of the primary, Adam Gibbs, the 24-year-old son of former Wisconsin circuit court judge Michael Gibbs, was declared the winner by a mere four votes. After a dramatic recount, August was ultimately ruled to be the winner by a margin of three votes. August subsequently won the general election with 58% of the vote.

=== Assembly Speaker pro tempore ===
In 2013, when Republican Assembly Majority Leader Scott Suder resigned his seat in the Assembly to accept an appointment from Governor Scott Walker, the Republican conference selected Bill Kramer, the Speaker pro tempore, to replace him. They then elected Tyler August, at the time in just his second term, to become the new Speaker pro tempore. He was subsequently re-elected by the conference at the start of the next three legislative sessions.

In the current term, August serves on the Committees on Assembly Organization, Government Accountability and Oversight, Insurance, Rules, and Law Revision. He is co-chair of the Joint Survey Committee on Tax Exemptions, and also serves on the Joint Legislative Council and the Speaker's Task Force on Adoption.

In November 2020, August was re-elected to his role as Assembly Speaker Pro Tempore.

In June 2022, Governor Tony Evers called for a special session to pass laws which would have legalized abortion in Wisconsin until viability. Abortion was banned in Wisconsin earlier in the month after the Supreme Court of the United States decided that the Constitution of the United States did not confer the right to abortion. This decision triggered the implementation of an 1849 state law that banned abortion, except to protect the life of the mother. However, August and other Republicans in the Legislature gaveled the special session in and out, keeping abortion illegal in the state.

=== Assembly Majority Leader ===
August was elected as Majority Leader of the Assembly on November 10, 2022, replacing Jim Steineke, who resigned on July 27, 2022. He was replaced as Speaker pro tempore by Kevin Petersen.

== Electoral history ==
=== Wisconsin Assembly, 32nd district (2010–2022) ===
Year	Election	Date	Elected				Defeated				Total	Plurality
2010	Primary	Sep. 14	Tyler August	Republican	1,760	23.97%	Adam Gibbs	Rep.	1,757	23.93%	7,342	3
2010	Primary	Sep. 14	Tyler August	Republican	1,760	23.97%	Mel Nieuwenhuis	Rep.	1,642	22.36%	7,342	3
2010	Primary	Sep. 14	Tyler August	Republican	1,760	23.97%	Dan Necci	Rep.	1,311	17.86%	7,342	3
2010	Primary	Sep. 14	Tyler August	Republican	1,760	23.97%	Thomas E. Stelling	Rep.	514	7.00%	7,342	3
2010	Primary	Sep. 14	Tyler August	Republican	1,760	23.97%	John K. Finley	Rep.	354	4.82%	7,342	3
2010	General	Nov. 2	Tyler August	Republican	10,868	58.09%	Doug A. Harrod	Dem.	5,156	27.56%	18,708	5,712
2010	General	Nov. 2	Tyler August	Republican	10,868	58.09%	Daniel G. Kilkenny	Ind.	1,983	10.60%	18,708	5,712
2010	General	Nov. 2	Tyler August	Republican	10,868	58.09%	Rick Pappas	Ind.	648	3.46%	18,708	5,712
2012	General	Nov. 6	Tyler August (inc)	Republican	15,586	57.10%	Kim M. Peterson	Dem.	10,828	39.67%	27,294	4,758
2012	General	Nov. 6	Tyler August (inc)	Republican	15,586	57.10%	David Stolow	Ind.	847	3.10%	27,294	4,758
2014	General	Nov. 4	Tyler August (inc)	Republican	13,714	65.79%	Alan Kupsik	Dem.	7,094	34.03%	20,845	6,620
2016	General	Nov. 8	Tyler August (inc)	Republican	16,862	62.47%	Christine Welcher	Dem.	10,090	37.38%	24,925	6,772
2018	General	Nov. 6	Tyler August (inc)	Republican	14,813	59.22%	Katherine R. Gaulke	Dem.	10,182	40.70%	25,015	4,631
2018	General	Nov. 6	Tyler August (inc)	Republican	14,813	59.22%	Jeremiah Sutton (write-in)	Rep.	2	0.01%	25,015	4,631
2020	General	Nov. 3	Tyler August (inc)	Republican	20,164	61.74%	Katherine R. Gaulke	Dem.	12,460	38.15%	32,657	7,740
2020	General	Nov. 3	Tyler August (inc)	Republican	20,164	61.74%	Jacquelyn Rose Romando (write-in)	Ind.	1	0.00%	32,657	7,740
2022	General	Nov. 8	Tyler August (inc)	Republican	15,757	62.89%	Adam Jaramillo	Dem.	9,269	37.00%	25,053	6,488

=== Wisconsin Assembly, 31st district (2024–present) ===
Year	Election	Date	Elected				Defeated				Total	Plurality
2024	General	Nov. 5	Tyler August	Republican	20,769	63.32%	John H. Henderson	Dem.	11,965	36.47%	32,802	8,804

Wisconsin State Assembly
Preceded by Bill Kramer	Speaker pro tempore of the Wisconsin State Assembly; 2013–2023	Succeeded by Kevin David Petersen
Preceded by Jim Steineke	Majority Leader of the Wisconsin State Assembly; 2023–present	Incumbent
