= Wisconsin's 22nd Assembly district =

American legislative district in Ozaukee County and Washington County, Wisconsin

Wisconsin's 22nd State Assembly district
- 2024 map defined in 2023 Wisc. Act 94; 2022 map defined in Johnson v. Wisconsin Elections Commission; 2011 map was defined in 2011 Wisc. Act 43
Assemblymember
Paul Melotik; R–Grafton
since January 6, 2025 (1 years)
- Demographics: 91.84% White; 1.65% Black; 2.19% Hispanic; 2.6% Asian; 1.14% Native American; 0.1% Hawaiian/Pacific Islander
- Population (2020) • Voting age: 59,167; 45,904
- Website: Official website
- Notes: Milwaukee metro area (northwest)

The 22nd Assembly district of Wisconsin is one of 99 districts in the Wisconsin State Assembly. Located in southeastern Wisconsin, the district comprises areas of southern Ozaukee County and part of southeast Washington County. It includes the cities of Cedarburg and Port Washington, and western Mequon, and the village of Grafton and the northern half of the village of Germantown. The district is represented by Republican Paul Melotik, since January 2025; Melotik previously represented the 24th district from August 2023 to January 2025.

The 22nd Assembly district is located within Wisconsin's 8th Senate district, along with the 23rd and 24th Assembly districts.

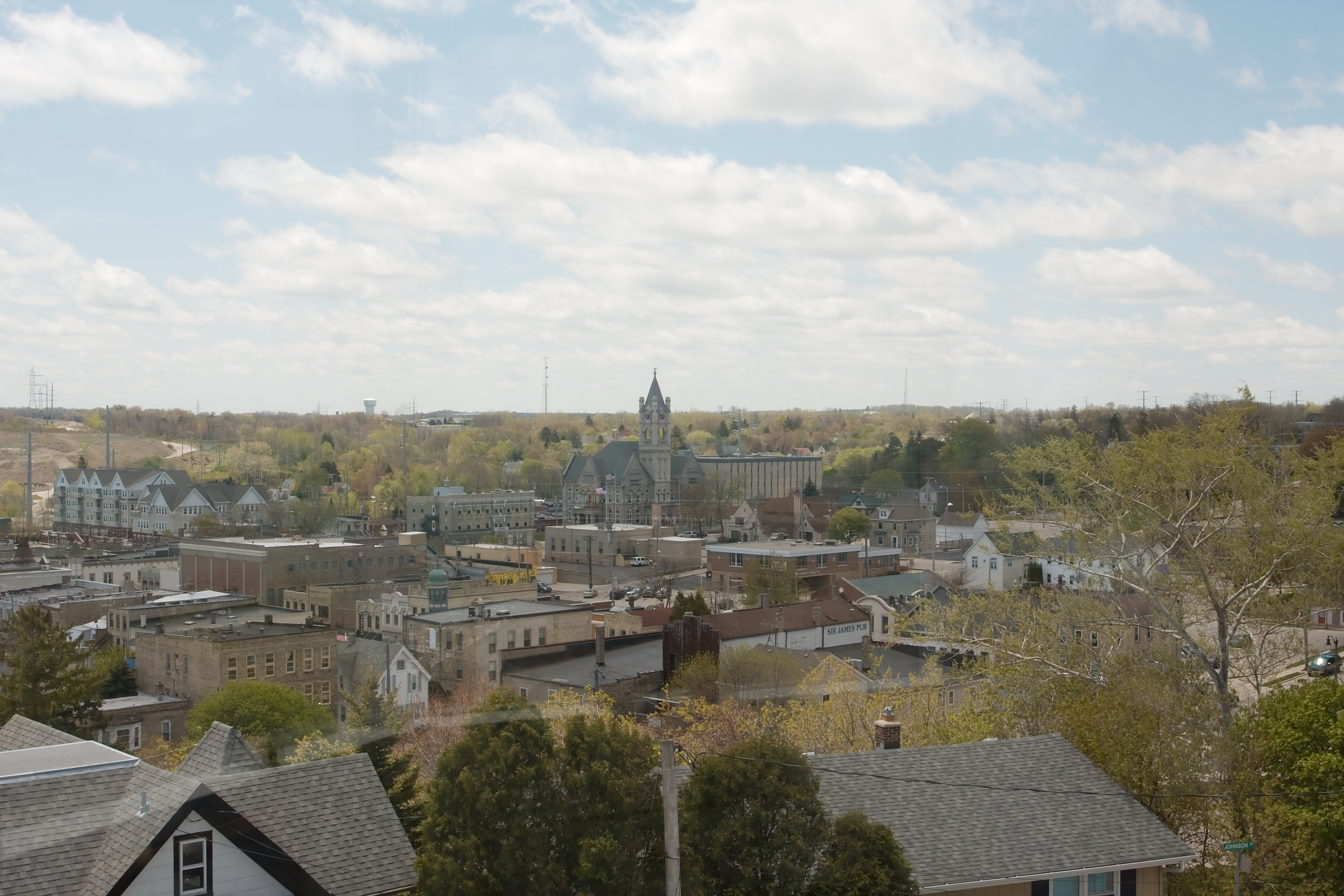
Downtown Port Washington

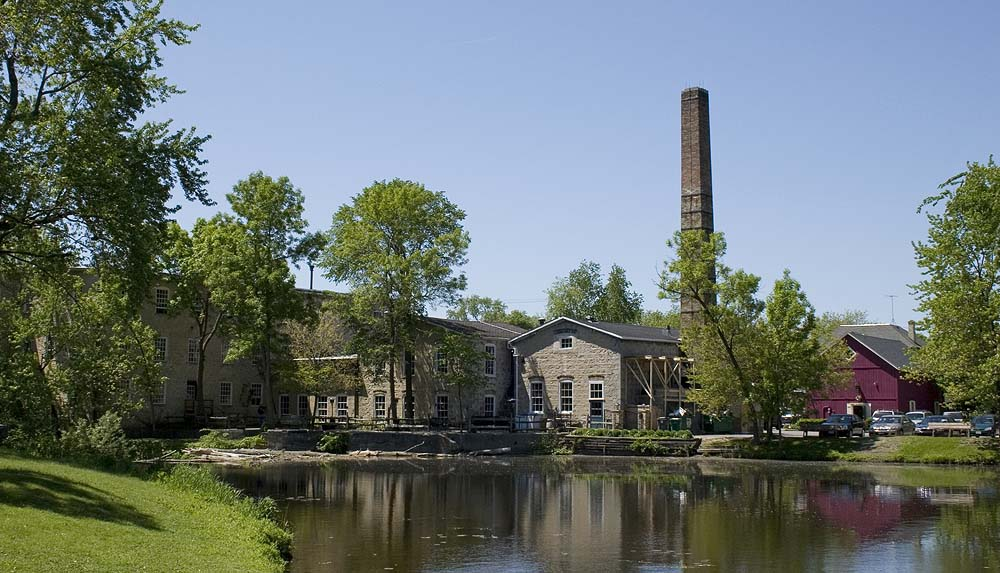
Hilgen and Wittenberg Woolen Mill in Cedarburg

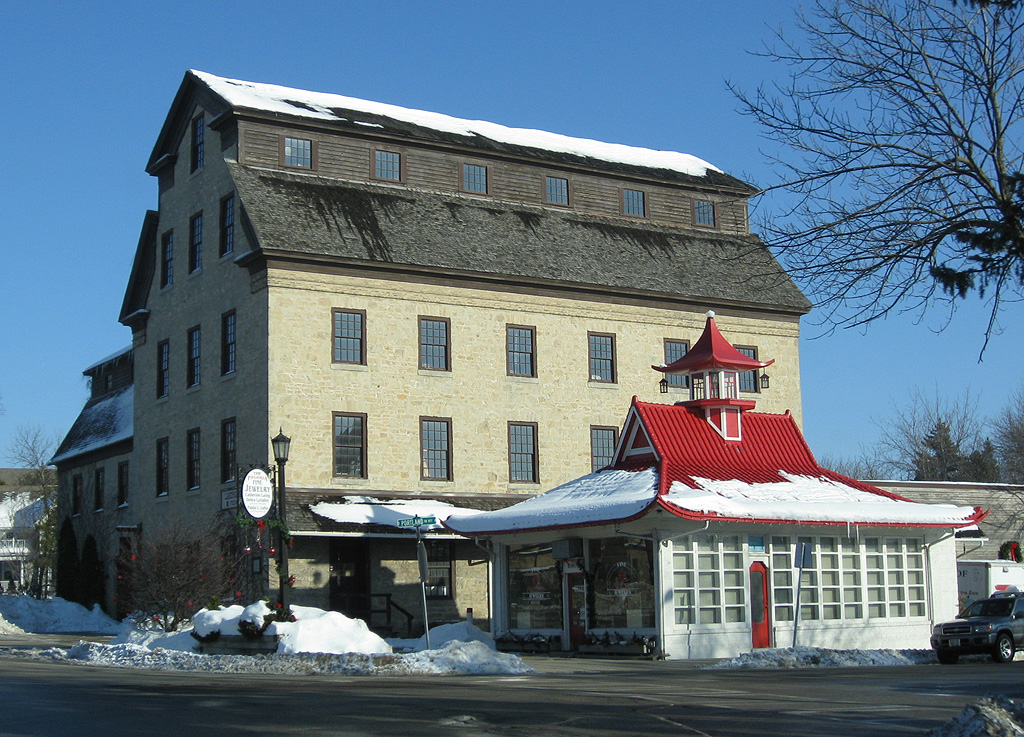
Cedarburg Mill

== List of past representatives ==
List of representatives to the Wisconsin State Assembly from the 22nd district
Member	Party	Residence	Counties represented	Term start	Term end	Ref.
District created
George Klicka	Rep.	Wauwatosa	Milwaukee	January 1, 1973	January 3, 1983	
Cloyd A. Porter	Dem.	Burlington	Kenosha, Racine, Walworth	January 3, 1983	January 7, 1985	
Jeannette Bell	Dem.	West Allis	Milwaukee	January 7, 1985	January 3, 1993	
Polly W. Beal	Rep.	River Hills	Milwaukee	January 3, 1993	January 2, 1995	
Sheldon Wasserman	Dem.	Milwaukee	Milwaukee	January 2, 1995	January 5, 2009	
Sandy Pasch	Dem.	Whitefish Bay	Milwaukee	January 5, 2009	January 7, 2013	
Don Pridemore	Rep.	Hartford	Milwaukee, Washington, Waukesha	January 7, 2013	January 5, 2015	
Janel Brandtjen	Rep.	Menomonee Falls	Milwaukee, Washington, Waukesha	January 5, 2015	January 6, 2025	
Janel Brandtjen	Rep.	Menomonee Falls	Washington, Waukesha	January 5, 2015	January 6, 2025	
Paul Melotik	Rep.	Grafton	Ozaukee, Washington	January 6, 2025	Current	
