= Duey Stroebel =

21st century American politician

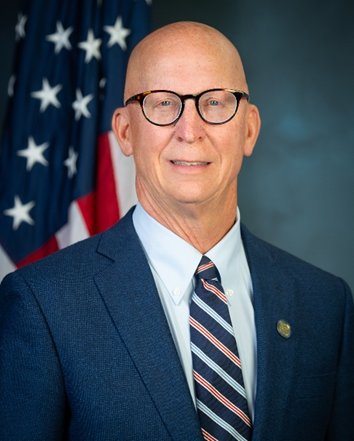
- Official portrait, 2025

Member of the Wisconsin Senate from the 20th district
- In office April 15, 2015 – January 6, 2025
- Preceded by: Glenn Grothman
- Succeeded by: Dan Feyen

Member of the Wisconsin State Assembly from the 60th district
- In office May 17, 2011 – January 5, 2015
- Preceded by: Mark Gottlieb
- Succeeded by: Robert Brooks

Personal details
- Born: Sherburn Duane Stroebel Jr. September 1, 1959 (age 66) Cedarburg, Wisconsin, U.S.
- Party: Republican
- Spouse: Laura
- Children: 8
- Education: University of Wisconsin, Madison (BBA, MS)

Sherburn Duane "Duey" Stroebel Jr. (born September 1, 1959) is an American public administrator, realtor, and Republican politician from Cedarburg, Wisconsin. He is the midwest regional administrator of the U.S. Department of Housing and Urban Development since July 2025. He previously represented the Cedarburg area for 14 years in the Wisconsin Legislature, serving 10 years in the Wisconsin Senate (2015–2025) and four years in the state Assembly (2011–2015).

== Background and education ==
Stroebel was born in Cedarburg, Wisconsin. He received his bachelor's and master's degrees from the University of Wisconsin–Madison and has a real estate business in Cedarburg, Wisconsin.

== Political career ==
Stroebel served on the Cedarburg School Board from 2007 to 2012.

After the 2010 election, Cedarburg's incumbent state representative, Mark Gottlieb, resigned his seat to accept a job in the administration of Governor-elect Scott Walker. His resignation necessitated a special election in the safe Republican 60th Assembly district. Stroebel was the sixth candidate to join the race for the Republican nomination, which ultimately grew to seven. He narrowly prevailed in the April 2011 special Republican primary, with a 61 vote margin over Gary Wickert. On May 3, he won the special election, defeating Democrat Rick Aaron and securing his first term in the Wisconsin State Assembly.

Stroebel won re-election in 2012, but in April 2014, he announced he would seek the Republican nomination for U.S. House of Representatives in the 6th congressional district seat being vacated by the retirement of Tom Petri. The Republican primary attracted two other incumbent state legislators, Joe Leibham and Glenn Grothman, with Grothman ultimately winning the primary. Stroebel came in third with just under 25% of the vote. Grothman went on to won the general election.

Grothman's victory, however, created a vacancy in Wisconsin's 20th Senate district and necessitated another special election in Spring 2015. Stroebel entered the race and faced another Republican primary against Ozaukee County Board Chairman Lee Schlenvogt and Slinger resident Tiffany Koehler. Stroebel and the other two candidates emphasized their support for right-to-work legislation. He won the election with 67% of the vote and was unopposed in the general election.

Stroebel has been on the Joint Finance Committee, and Committee on Government Operations, Technology, and Consumer Protection.

In 2019, Stroebel opposed Governor Tony Evers' proposal to decriminalize marijuana, and equated decriminalization with legalization.

In 2020, during the COVID-19 pandemic, Stroebel opposed Governor Evers' order requiring the use of face coverings in public indoor places to prevent the spread of the virus; along with fellow Republican senator Steve Nass, Stroebel called for a legislative session to nullify the order. The same year, Stroebel also criticized Wisconsin State Fair organizers for deciding to cancel the annual event, accusing the Fair of taking a "defeatist approach".

In 2021, Stroebel introduced legislation that would restrict absentee voting and ballot collection, and impose stricter requirements on voters who are "indefinitely confined" due to age or disability. Disability rights groups opposed the changes.

The 2024 redistricting law significantly redrew state legislative districts, and Stroebel was drawn out of the 20th Senate district and into the 8th Senate district, with fellow incumbent Republican senator Dan Knodl. Knodl quickly announced he would run for Assembly instead of forcing an incumbent vs incumbent primary. Stroebel later confirmed that he would run for re-election in the 8th Senate district. The new district contains almost none of his previous Senate district, other than his native Cedarburg and a few neighboring municipalities in Ozaukee County.

Stroebel faced Democrat Jodi Habush Sinykin in the 2024 general election—his first contested election in nearly a decade. The new 8th Senate district was projected to be one of the most competitive Wisconsin Senate districts under the new map, and received heavy investment from both parties. As of mid-October 2024, the 8th Senate district election was already the most expensive state legislative race in Wisconsin history, with combined spending exceeding $2.5 million. In the end, the 8th Senate district ended up the closest Senate election in the state; Stroebel lost by 1.2% of the vote.

On July 25, 2025, U.S. Department of Housing and Urban Development secretary Scott Turner announced that Stroebel had been appointed midwest regional director.

== Electoral history ==
=== Wisconsin Assembly (2011, 2012) ===
Year	Election	Date	Elected				Defeated				Total	Plurality
2011 (special)	Special; Primary	Apr. 5	Duey Stroebel	Republican	3,125	26.60%	Gary Wickert	Rep.	3,064	26.08%	11,748	61
2011 (special)	Special; Primary	Apr. 5	Duey Stroebel	Republican	3,125	26.60%	Paul Melotik	Rep.	2,132	18.15%	11,748	61
2011 (special)	Special; Primary	Apr. 5	Duey Stroebel	Republican	3,125	26.60%	Jake Curtis	Rep.	2,076	17.67%	11,748	61
2011 (special)	Special; Primary	Apr. 5	Duey Stroebel	Republican	3,125	26.60%	John Soper	Rep.	501	4.26%	11,748	61
2011 (special)	Special; Primary	Apr. 5	Duey Stroebel	Republican	3,125	26.60%	Rik Kluessendorf	Rep.	349	2.97%	11,748	61
2011 (special)	Special	May 3	Duey Stroebel	Republican	7,331	75.56%	Rick Aaron	Dem.	2,357	24.29%	9,702	4,974
2012	General	Nov. 6	Duey Stroebel (inc)	Republican	23,905	71.08%	Perry Duman	Dem.	9,682	28.79%	33,633	14,223

=== U.S. House, Wisconsin's 6th district (2014) ===
Year	Election	Date	Elected				Defeated				Total	Plurality
2014	Primary	Aug. 12	Glenn Grothman	Republican	23,247	36.16%	Joe Leibham	Rep.	23,028	35.82%	64,295	219
2014	Primary	Aug. 12	Glenn Grothman	Republican	23,247	36.16%	Duey Stroebel	Rep.	15,873	24.69%	64,295	219
2014	Primary	Aug. 12	Glenn Grothman	Republican	23,247	36.16%	Tom Denow	Rep.	2,117	3.29%	64,295	219

=== Wisconsin Senate, 20th district (2015–2020) ===
Year	Election	Date	Elected				Defeated				Total	Plurality
2015 (special)	Special; Primary	Feb. 17	Duey Stroebel	Republican	9,317	67.58%	Lee E. Schlenvogt	Rep.	3,315	24.05%	13,786	6,002
2015 (special)	Special; Primary	Feb. 17	Duey Stroebel	Republican	9,317	67.58%	Tiffany Koehler	Rep.	1,146	8.31%	13,786	6,002
2015 (special)	Special	Apr. 7	Duey Stroebel	Republican	23,347	98.77%	--unopposed--				23,638	23,056
2016	General	Nov. 8	Duey Stroebel (inc)	Republican	79,743	98.21%	--unopposed--				81,193	78,293
2020	General	Nov. 3	Duey Stroebel (inc)	Republican	87,715	98.69%	--unopposed--				88,881	86,549

=== Wisconsin Senate, 8th district (2024) ===
Year	Election	Date	Elected				Defeated				Total	Plurality
2024	General	Nov. 5	Jodi Habush Sinykin	Democratic	60,471	50.68%	Duey Stroebel	Rep.	58,686	49.18%	119,317	1,785
