= Janel Brandtjen =

American politician (born 1966)

Member of the Wisconsin State Assembly from the 22nd district
- In office January 5, 2015 – January 6, 2025
- Preceded by: Don Pridemore
- Succeeded by: Paul Melotik

Personal details
- Born: March 27, 1966 (age 60) Milwaukee, Wisconsin, U.S.
- Party: Republican
- Spouse: Rick
- Children: 2
- Education: University of Wisconsin–Milwaukee (BBA)

Janel Brandtjen (born March 27, 1966) is an American businesswoman and Republican politician and from Waukesha County, Wisconsin. She was a member of the Wisconsin State Assembly, representing Wisconsin's 22nd Assembly district from January 2015 until January 2025. She has been a leader among those in Wisconsin denying the results of the 2020 United States presidential election and she was one of several state lawmakers who signed a letter asking Vice President Mike Pence to reject the electoral votes of Wisconsin. She has a long-running feud with Republican state Assembly speaker Robin Vos, and of seeking retribution against those who participated in the election administration

== Biography ==
Born in Milwaukee, Wisconsin, Brandjten received a Bachelor of Business Administration in Finance and Marketing from University of Wisconsin–Milwaukee. Brandtjen is married and has two children. Together with her husband, Brandtjen owns Group One Marketing, an advertising agency in Menomonee Falls. The company received two PPP loans of $31,111 and $30,902, both of which were forgiven.

She was elected to the Waukesha County Board of Supervisors in 2008 and served until 2016.

== Legislative career ==
On November 4, 2014, Brandtjen was elected to the Wisconsin State Assembly in Wisconsin's 22nd Assembly district, covering northeast Waukesha County and southwest Washington County. In the Wisconsin State Assembly, she has pushed for legislation to prohibit the use of fetal tissue in research.

After Joe Biden won Wisconsin in the 2020 presidential election and President Donald Trump refused to concede, Brandtjen claimed that there had been fraud and that Trump won Wisconsin. She said, "There is no doubt that... Donald Trump won this election in Wisconsin and several methods of fraud were used to change the outcome." Brandtjen remained a steadfast supporter of Trump's fraud claims and made several attempts to use her position as chair of the Assembly committee on campaigns and elections to further election-skeptic initiatives, like the year-long investigation by former Wisconsin Supreme Court justice Michael Gableman, which ultimately turned up no evidence of fraud. She also supported a bill to "de-certify" the results of the 2020 election—Republican Assembly speaker Robin Vos reacted by saying that this was not legally possible. Brandtjen then supported a primary challenge against Vos, which he narrowly defeated.

Brandtjen's attempts to de-certify the 2020 election and her clashes with Vos and other Republican caucus leaders eventually led to sanctions from the caucus. The week after the 2022 election, the Republican Assembly caucus voted to bar her from attending any further closed meetings of the caucus, saying that they had lost trust in her. Vos subsequently stripped Brandtjen of her chairmanship of the Assembly campaigns and elections committee.

On December 6, 2022, Brandtjen announced that she was running in the special election for the 8th state senate district after incumbent Alberta Darling resigned. Brandtjen faced Dan Knodl and Van Mobley in the Republican primary race. Knodl defeated Brandtjen and was subsequently elected to the seat.

Brandtjen continued to court controversy and pursue 2020 election conspiracy theories into the 106th Wisconsin Legislature, when she drafted articles of impeachment against Wisconsin Elections Commission administrator Meagan Wolfe.

After the 2024 redistricting, Brandtjen was drawn out of the 22nd Assembly district. Instead, she resided in the redrawn 24th Assembly district. Brandtjen decided to run for a sixth term in the new Assembly district, but faced a competitive primary rematch against Dan Knodl, who was leaving his recently won state Senate seat due to redistricting. At the August primary, Knodl prevailed by a large margin; Brandtjen received just 37% of the vote.

== Alleged campaign finance violations ==
On February 23, 2024, the bipartisan Wisconsin Ethics Commission recommended felony charges against Brandtjen and a fundraising committee connected to former U.S. President Donald Trump—the Save America Joint Fundraising Committee. The charges stem from alleged campaign finance violations in their coordinated effort to support candidate Adam Steen in his campaign to defeat Wisconsin Assembly speaker Robin Vos in the 2022 Republican primary. Steen lost the election to Vos by 260 votes, the closest race of Vos' career.

The alleged violations involve a scheme to funnel donations through three Wisconsin county Republican parties, which would then transfer the funds to Steen's campaign. The referral points to Brandtjen as a central figure in the scheme, facilitating the donations from Save America to the three complicit county parties. The Waukesha County district attorney declined to pursue charges against Brandtjen, saying that tapes of conversations about the scheme were likely inadmissible at trial. The charges were later referred to the Wisconsin Department of Justice, which is still considering whether to bring charges.

Wisconsin State Assembly
Preceded by Don Pridemore	Member of the Wisconsin State Assembly from the 22nd district January 5, 2015 – January 6, 2025	Succeeded by Paul Melotik
