= Wisconsin's 24th Assembly district =

American legislative district in southeast Wisconsin

Wisconsin's 24th State Assembly district
- 2024 map defined in 2023 Wisc. Act 94; 2022 map defined in Johnson v. Wisconsin Elections Commission; 2011 map was defined in 2011 Wisc. Act 43
Assemblymember
Dan Knodl; R–Germantown
since January 6, 2025 (1 years)
- Demographics: 86.28% White; 3.99% Black; 2.57% Hispanic; 5.5% Asian; 1.19% Native American; 0.1% Hawaiian/Pacific Islander
- Population (2020) • Voting age: 59,858; 46,818
- Website: Official website
- Notes: Milwaukee metro area (northwest)

The 24th Assembly district of Wisconsin is one of 99 districts in the Wisconsin State Assembly. Located in southeastern Wisconsin, the district comprises parts of southeast Washington County and northeast Waukesha County. It includes the villages of Menomonee Falls and Lannon, and the southern half of the village of Germantown. The district is represented by Republican Dan Knodl, since January 2025. Knodl previously was this district's representative from January 2009 to May 2023.

The 24th Assembly district is located within Wisconsin's 8th Senate district, along with the 22nd and 23rd Assembly districts.

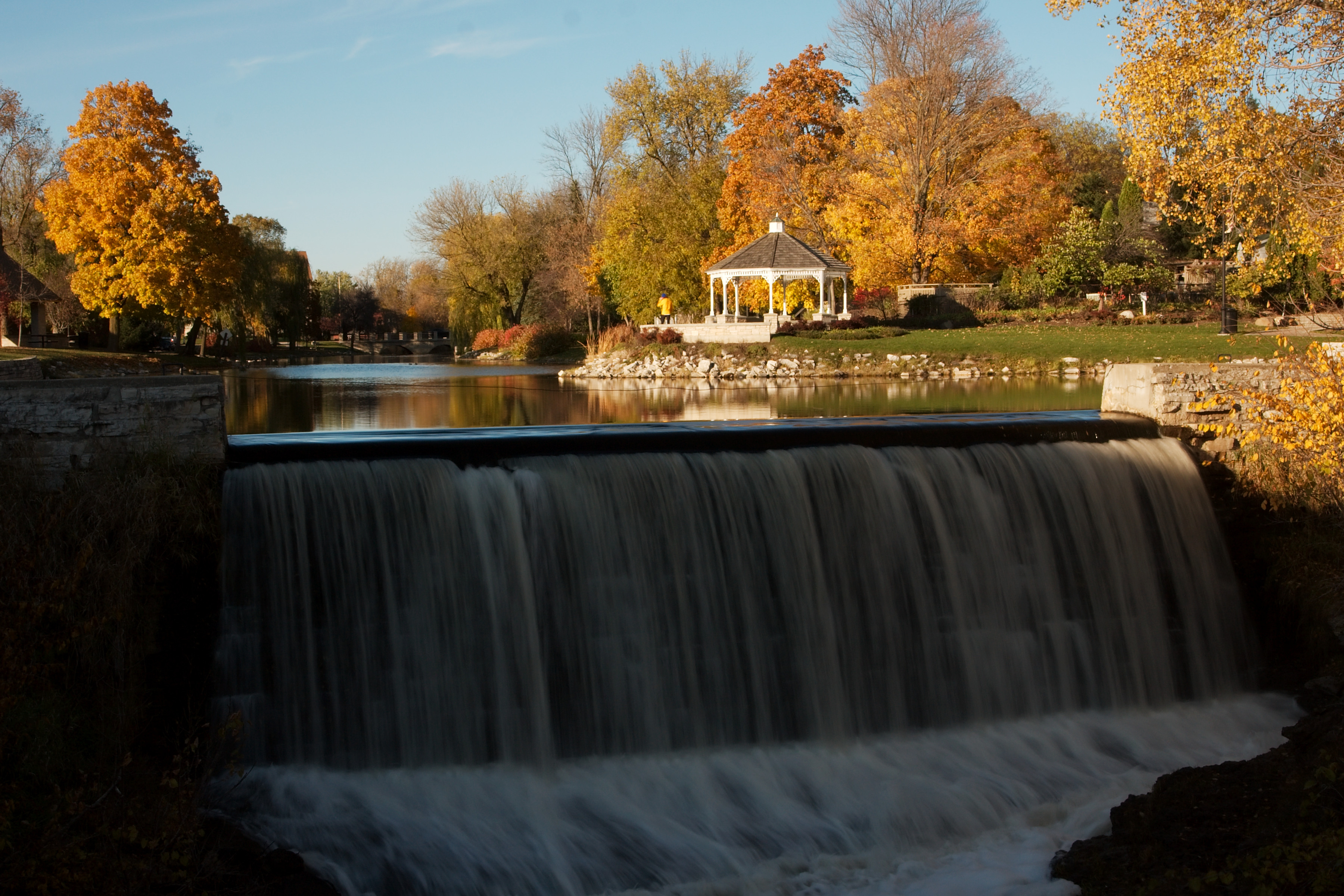
Mill Pond Park in Menomonee Falls

== List of past representatives ==
List of representatives to the Wisconsin State Assembly from the 24th district
Member	Party	Residence	Counties represented	Term start	Term end	Ref.
District created
Gary J. Barczak	Dem.	West Allis	Milwaukee	January 1, 1973	January 3, 1983	
Joseph F. Andrea	Dem.	Kenosha	Kenosha	January 3, 1983	January 7, 1985	
Peggy Krusick	Dem.	Milwaukee	Milwaukee	January 7, 1985	January 3, 1993	
Lolita Schneiders	Rep.	Menomonee Falls	Washington, Waukesha	January 3, 1993	January 6, 1997	
Suzanne Jeskewitz	Rep.	Menomonee Falls	Washington, Waukesha	January 6, 1997	January 5, 2009	
Dan Knodl	Rep.	Germantown	Washington, Waukesha	January 5, 2009	May 3, 2023	
Dan Knodl	Rep.	Germantown	Milwaukee, Ozaukee, Washington, Waukesha	January 5, 2009	May 3, 2023	
Dan Knodl	Rep.	Germantown	Ozaukee, Washington, Waukesha	January 5, 2009	May 3, 2023	
--Vacant--			Ozaukee, Washington, Waukesha	May 3, 2023	August 7, 2023	
Paul Melotik	Rep.	Grafton	Ozaukee, Washington, Waukesha	August 7, 2023	January 6, 2025	
Dan Knodl	Rep.	Germantown	Washington, Waukesha	January 6, 2025	Current	
