= 2012 Wisconsin Senate election =

- November 6, 2012

16 of 33 seats in the Wisconsin Senate 16 seats needed for a majority
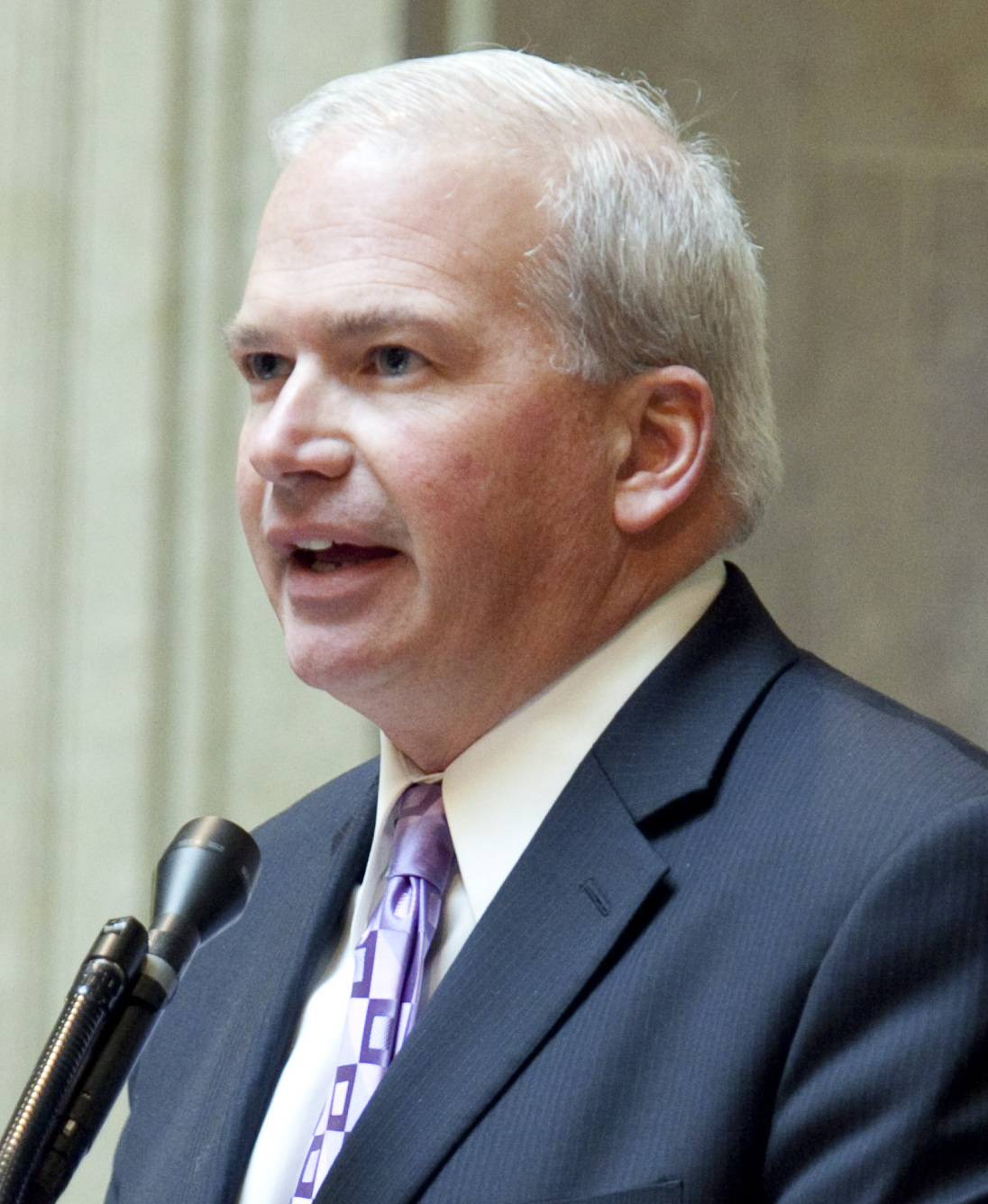

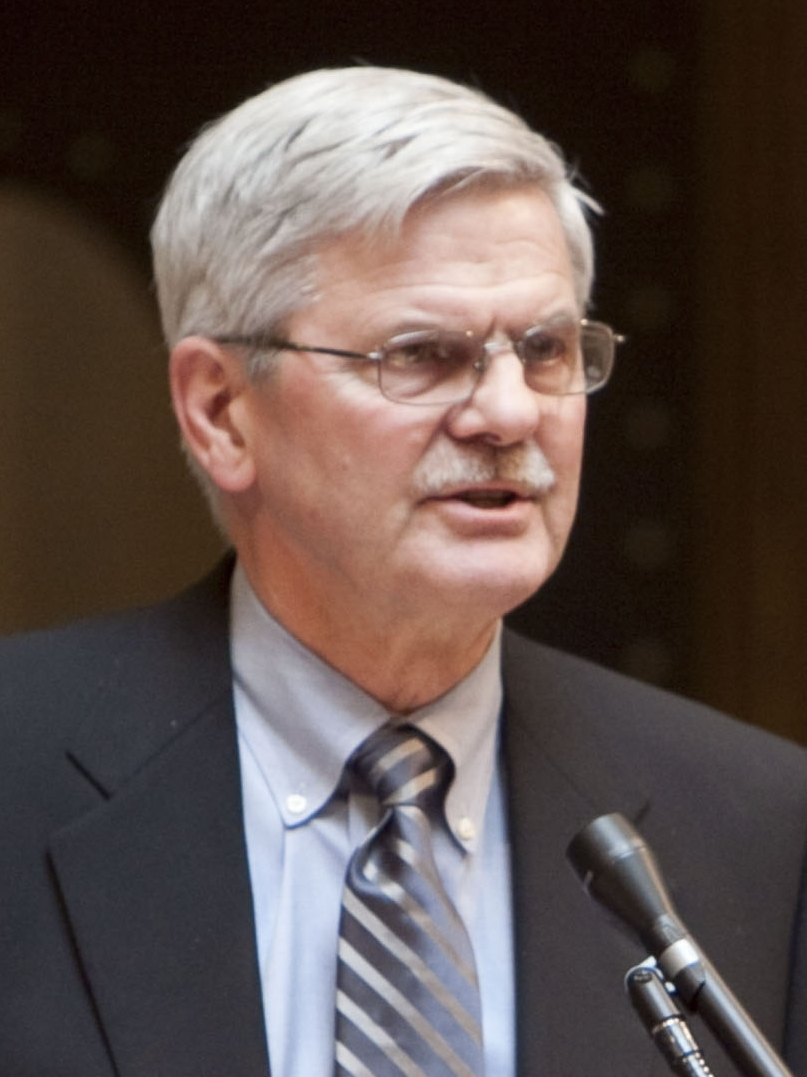
	Majority party	Minority party
Leader	Scott Fitzgerald	Mark F. Miller (retired as leader)
Party	Republican	Democratic
Leader since	January 1, 2007	January 12, 2011
Leader's seat	13th–Juneau	16th–Monona
Last election	11 seats, 59.11%	6 seats, 40.54%
Seats before	16	17
Seats won	8	8
Seats after	18	15
Seat change	▲2	▼2
Popular vote	593,893	696,773
Percentage	45.28%	53.13%
Swing	▼13.8 pp	▲12.6 pp
- Results of the elections: Republican hold Republican gain Democratic hold No election
President before election
Fred Risser
Democratic
Elected President
Michael G. Ellis
Republican

The 2012 Wisconsin Senate elections were held on Tuesday, November 6, 2012. Sixteen of the 33 seats in the Wisconsin Senate were up for election—the even-numbered districts. This was the first Senate general election to take place after redistricting following the 2010 United States census. Before the election, 17 Senate seats were held by Democrats and 16 seats were held by Republicans. 10 Democratic seats and 6 Republican seats were up in this election. The primary election took place on August 13, 2012.

Republicans flipped two Democratic-held Senate seat and won the chamber majority, entering the 101st Wisconsin Legislature with 18 of 33 State Senate seats.

== Results summary ==
Seats		Party (majority caucus shading)		Total
Seats		Democratic	Republican	Total
Last election (2010)		6	11	17
Total after last election (2010)		14	19	33
Total before this election		17	16	33
Up for election		10	6	16
of which:	Incumbent retiring	2	0	2
of which:	Vacated	0	0	0
of which:	Unopposed	3	1	4
This election		8	8	16
Change from last election		▼2	▲2	
Total after this election		15	18	33
Change in total		▼2	▲2	

Popular vote
Democratic	53.13%
Republican	45.28%
Other	1.59%

Senate seats won
Democratic	50%
Republican	50%

=== Close races ===
Seats where the margin of victory was under 10%:

1. State Senate district 18, 0.7% (gain)
2. State Senate district 30, 8.55%

== Outgoing incumbents ==
=== Retiring ===
- Jim Holperin (D–Conover), representing district 12 since 2008, announced that he would not run for re-election.

=== Seeking other office ===
- Spencer Coggs (D–Milwaukee), representing district 6 since 2003, was elected Milwaukee Treasurer at the April 2012 election, and then did not seek re-election to the Senate in the fall.

== Predictions ==
Source	Ranking	As of
Governing	Lean R (flip)	October 24, 2012

== Candidates and results ==
Dist.	Incumbent			This race		
Dist.	Member	Party	First elected	Primary election candidates	General election candidates	Result
2	Robert Cowles	Republican	1987 (special)	Robert Cowles (Rep.)	✓ Robert Cowles (Rep.) 98.54%	Incumbent re-elected.
4	Lena Taylor	Democratic	2004	Lena Taylor (Dem.)	✓ Lena Taylor (Dem.) 86.62%; David D. King (Ind.) 13.11%	Incumbent re-elected.
6	Spencer Coggs	Democratic	2003 (recall)	Nikiya Harris (Dem.); Michael Mayo (Dem.); Allyn Monroe Swan (Dem.); Elizabeth M. Coggs (Dem.); Delta L. Triplett (Dem.)	✓ Nikiya Harris (Dem.) 98.72%	Incumbent retired. Democratic hold.
8	Alberta Darling	Republican	1992	Alberta Darling (Rep.)	✓ Alberta Darling (Rep.) 95.58%; Beth L. Lueck (Dem. write-in)	Incumbent re-elected.
10	Sheila Harsdorf	Republican	2000	Sheila Harsdorf (Rep.); Daniel C. Olson (Dem.)	✓ Sheila Harsdorf (Rep.) 59.17%; Daniel C. Olson (Dem.) 40.72%	Incumbent re-elected.
12	Jim Holperin	Democratic	2008	Tom Tiffany (Rep.); Susan Sommer (Dem.); Lisa Theo (Dem.)	✓ Tom Tiffany (Rep.) 56.24%; Susan Sommer (Dem.) 40.45%; Paul O. Ehlers (Ind.) 3.26%	Incumbent retired. New member elected. Republican gain.
14	Luther Olsen	Republican	2004	Luther Olsen (Rep.); David Wayne Eiler (Rep.); Margarete Worthington (Dem.)	✓ Luther Olsen (Rep.) 57.53%; Margarete Worthington (Dem.) 42.4%	Incumbent re-elected.
16	Mark F. Miller	Democratic	2004	Mark F. Miller (Dem.)	✓ Mark F. Miller (Dem.) 98.73%	Incumbent re-elected.
18	Jessica King	Democratic	2011 (recall)	Rick Gudex (Rep.); Jessica King (Dem.)	✓ Rick Gudex (Rep.) 50.3%; Jessica King (Dem.) 49.6%	Incumbent lost. New member elected. Republican gain.
20	Glenn Grothman	Republican	2004	Glenn Grothman (Rep.); Tanya Lohr (Dem.)	✓ Glenn Grothman (Rep.) 68.63%; Tanya Lohr (Dem.) 31.3%	Incumbent re-elected.
22	Robert Wirch	Democratic	1996	Robert Wirch (Dem.); Pam Stevens (Rep.)	✓ Robert Wirch (Dem.) 69.57%; Pam Stevens (Rep.) 30.29%	Incumbent re-elected.
24	Julie Lassa	Democratic	2003 (special)	Julie Lassa (Dem.); Scott Kenneth Noble (Rep.); Steve Abrahamson (Rep.)	✓ Julie Lassa (Dem.) 56.59%; Scott Kenneth Noble (Rep.) 43.31%	Incumbent re-elected.
26	Fred Risser	Democratic	1962	Fred Risser (Dem.)	✓ Fred Risser (Dem.)	Incumbent re-elected.
28	Mary Lazich	Republican	1998	Mary Lazich (Rep.); Jim Ward (Dem.)	✓ Mary Lazich (Rep.) 63.38%; Jim Ward (Dem.) 36.51%	Incumbent re-elected.
30	Dave Hansen	Democratic	2000	Dave Hansen (Dem.); John Macco (Rep.); Ray Suennen (Rep.)	✓ Dave Hansen (Dem.) 54.23%; John Macco (Rep.) 45.68%	Incumbent re-elected.
32	Jennifer Shilling	Democratic	2011 (recall)	Jennifer Shilling (Dem.); Bill Feehan (Rep.)	✓ Jennifer Shilling (Dem.) 58.28%; Bill Feehan (Rep.) 41.64%	Incumbent re-elected.

== See also ==
- 2012 Wisconsin elections
  - 2012 United States presidential election in Wisconsin
  - 2012 United States Senate election in Wisconsin
  - 2012 United States House of Representatives elections in Wisconsin
  - 2012 Wisconsin State Assembly election
- 2012 United States elections
- Wisconsin Senate
- Elections in Wisconsin
- Redistricting in Wisconsin
