= Julie Lassa =

American politician (born 1970)

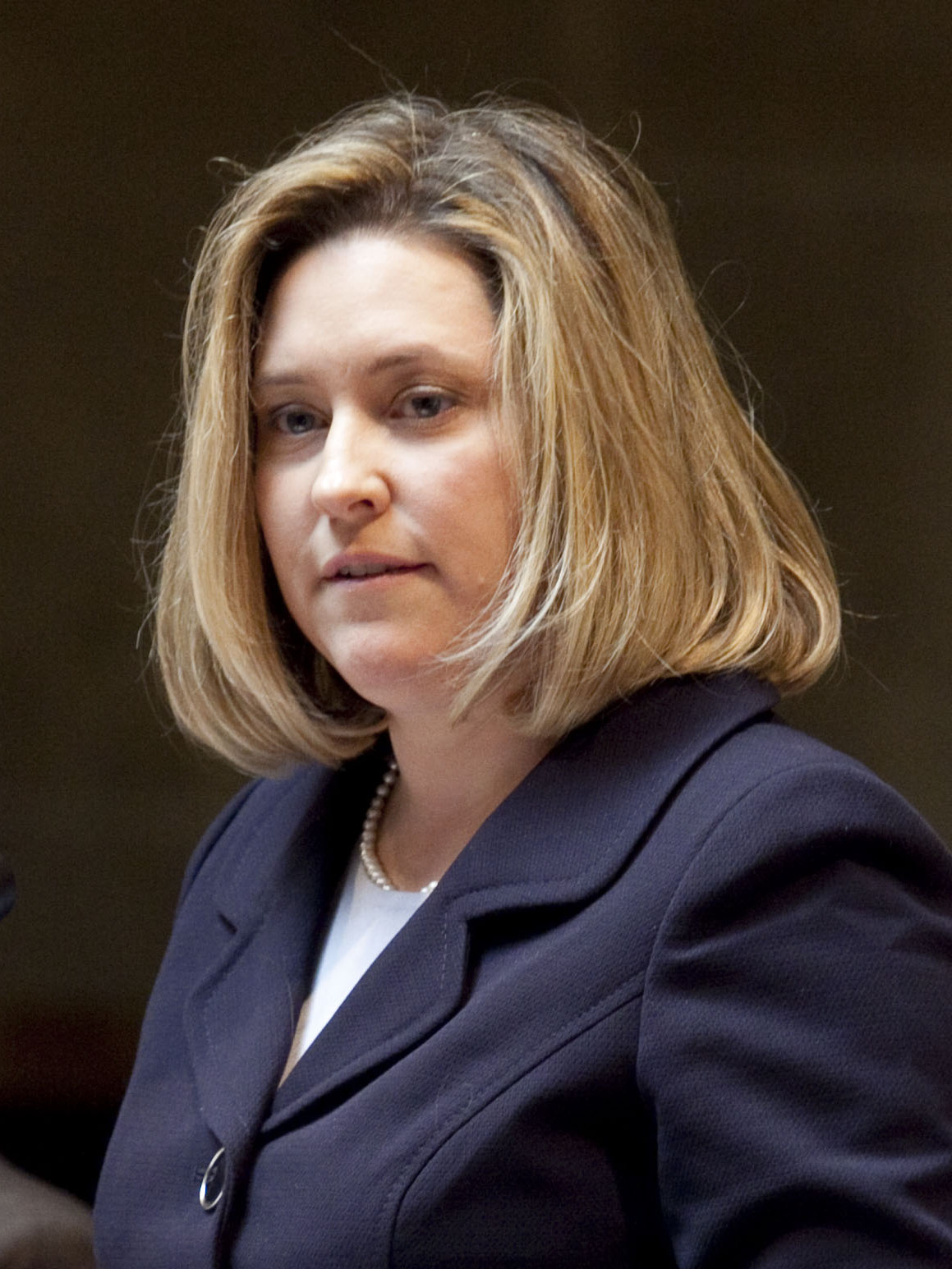
- Lassa in 2009

Member of the Wisconsin Senate from the 24th district
- In office May 9, 2003 – January 3, 2017
- Preceded by: Kevin Shibilski
- Succeeded by: Patrick Testin

Member of the Wisconsin State Assembly from the 71st district
- In office January 2, 1999 – May 9, 2003
- Preceded by: William Murat
- Succeeded by: Louis Molepske

Personal details
- Born: October 21, 1970 (age 55) Stevens Point, Wisconsin, U.S.
- Party: Democratic
- Spouse: John Moe
- Children: 3
- Education: University of Wisconsin–Stevens Point

Julie Mary Lassa (born October 21, 1970) is an American public administrator and Democratic politician from Stevens Point, Wisconsin. She is the administrator of the Division of Agricultural Development at the Wisconsin Department of Agriculture, Trade and Consumer Protection, since 2025. She previously represented the Portage County region for 14 years in the Wisconsin Senate (2003–2017), and before that served four years in the state Assembly (1999–2003). During the Biden administration, she served as Wisconsin administrator for USDA Rural Development.

== Early life and education ==
Julie Lassa was born in Stevens Point, Wisconsin, and has spent most of her life in the Stevens Point area, largely raised on her family's farm in the neighboring town of Dewey. She graduated from Stevens Point Area Senior High School and went on to attend college at the University of Wisconsin–Stevens Point; she earned a bachelor's degree in political science and public administration in 1993.

She served as the executive director of the Plover Area Business Association and as the chair of the Portage County Democratic Party.

Lassa is a member of the Heart of Wisconsin Business and Economic Alliance, Marshfield Area Chamber of Commerce and Industry, Business and Professional Women, and the Portage County, Wisconsin Business Council. Lassa was elected as a member of the Dewey Town Board from 1993 to 1994.

== Political career ==
Lassa became active in politics during college with the Democratic Party of Wisconsin, and was president of the UW–Stevens Point chapter of Young Democrats during 1992 and 1993.

After graduating from college, Lassa went directly into elected office, winning a seat on the Dewey town board in 1993. That same year, she was elected chair of the Democratic Party of Portage County, Wisconsin. During this time, she was employed as an administrative assistant with the Plover Area Business Association, and began working as a government affairs coordinator for the Stevens Point Board of Realtors.

In 1994, at age 24, she made her first bid for election to the Wisconsin State Assembly, after 71st district incumbent Stan Gruszynski declined to run for re-election. The 71st district then comprised Stevens Point and roughly the southern half of Portage County, along with parts of northern Waushara County. Lassa faced two opponents in the Democratic primary, former Portage County district attorney William Murat and Stephens Point streets department mechanic Gary Olds. Lassa's candidacy, at age 24, received significant media attention around the state, and she proved to be a capable fundraiser, outraising her more established opponents. Lassa ultimately lost the primary by about 500 votes to William Murat, and afterwards worked to secure his victory in the general election.

Lassa was re-elected as county party chair after the 1994 election, but a few months into the 1995 term, she resigned from party leadership to accept a job as legislative aide to state representative Donald W. Hasenohrl, at the Wisconsin State Capitol.

In 1998, Murat announced he would not run for a third term in the Assembly, and Lassa quickly announced that she would run again in the 71st Assembly district to succeed him. This time, Lassa faced no opposition for the Democratic nomination and went on to face Republican John Lopez Frank in the general election, cruising to victory with 60% of the vote.

Lassa served as a member of the Wisconsin State Assembly from 1998 through 2003. She successfully ran in 2003 for the Wisconsin Senate and served there until 2017.

In 2010 Lassa ran against Republican nominee Sean Duffy for Wisconsin's 7th congressional district, held by retiring Dave Obey. She was endorsed by Mike Tate, the Chairman of the Democratic Party of Wisconsin. Duffy defeated Lassa with a strong showing in the November 2010 general election.

During the 2011 protests in Wisconsin, Lassa, along with the 13 other Democratic State Senators, left the state to deny the State Senate a quorum on Governor Scott Walker's controversial "Budget Repair" legislation.

== Post-legislative career ==
After leaving office, Lassa went to work for Stevens Point-based Sentry Insurance, as a lobbyist and regulatory advisor in Madison. She remained there until 2021, when she was appointed Wisconsin state administrator for USDA Rural Development, under President Joe Biden. Since the end of the Biden administration, she has been appointed administrator of the Division of Agricultural Development at the Wisconsin Department of Agriculture, Trade and Consumer Protection.

== Personal life ==
Julie Lassa is the daughter of Jerome and Josephine Lassa of Mosinee, Wisconsin.

She married John Moe of McFarland, Wisconsin, on May 6, 2000, at St. Bronislava Catholic Church in Plover. John Moe was also active in Democratic politics as a campaign staffer for U.S. Representative Dave Obey, and later he served 13 years as city clerk of Stevens Point, from 2005 to 2018.

Since leaving elected office, Lassa and her husband have mostly resided in Dane County, Wisconsin; they have three children.

== Electoral history ==
=== Wisconsin Assembly (1994) ===
| Year | Election | Date | Elected | | | | Defeated | | | | Total | Plurality |
|---|---|---|---|---|---|---|---|---|---|---|---|---|
| 1994 | Primary | Sep. 13 | William Murat | Democratic | 2,846 | 50.11% | Julie M. Lassa | Dem. | 2,356 | 41.48% | 5,680 | 490 |
| 1994 | Primary | Sep. 13 | William Murat | Democratic | 2,846 | 50.11% | Gary Olds | Dem. | 478 | 8.42% | 5,680 | 490 |

=== Wisconsin Assembly (1998, 2000, 2002) ===
| Year | Election | Date | Elected | | | | Defeated | | | | Total | Plurality |
|---|---|---|---|---|---|---|---|---|---|---|---|---|
| 1998 | General | Nov. 3 | Julie M. Lassa | Democratic | 10,019 | 59.81% | John Lopez Frank | Rep. | 5,902 | 35.23% | 16,751 | 4,117 |
| 1998 | General | Nov. 3 | Julie M. Lassa | Democratic | 10,019 | 59.81% | Aaron T. Haase | Ind. | 521 | 3.11% | 16,751 | 4,117 |
| 1998 | General | Nov. 3 | Julie M. Lassa | Democratic | 10,019 | 59.81% | Richard Kealiher | Tax. | 309 | 1.84% | 16,751 | 4,117 |
| 2000 | General | Nov. 7 | Julie M. Lassa (inc) | Democratic | 17,512 | 70.27% | Leo V. Harris | Rep. | 7,372 | 29.58% | 24,922 | 10,140 |
| 2002 | General | Nov. 5 | Julie M. Lassa (inc) | Democratic | 13,056 | 72.42% | Leo V. Harris | Rep. | 4,956 | 27.49% | 18,028 | 8,100 |

=== Wisconsin Senate (2003–2016) ===
| Year | Election | Date | Elected | | | | Defeated | | | | Total | Plurality |
|---|---|---|---|---|---|---|---|---|---|---|---|---|
| 2003 (special) | Special | Apr. 29 | Julie M. Lassa | Democratic | 12,787 | 62.03% | Donna Rozar | Rep. | 6,118 | 29.68% | 20,613 | 6,669 |
| 2003 (special) | Special | Apr. 29 | Julie M. Lassa | Democratic | 12,787 | 62.03% | Jesse J. Higgins | Ind. | 972 | 4.72% | 20,613 | 6,669 |
| 2003 (special) | Special | Apr. 29 | Julie M. Lassa | Democratic | 12,787 | 62.03% | Jo Seiser | Grn. | 720 | 3.49% | 20,613 | 6,669 |
| 2004 | General | Nov. 2 | Julie M. Lassa (inc) | Democratic | 58,259 | 67.57% | Greg Swank | Rep. | 27,926 | 32.39% | 86,220 | 30,333 |
| 2008 | General | Nov. 4 | Julie M. Lassa (inc) | Democratic | 57,985 | 67.67% | Tom Kimmet | Rep. | 27,660 | 32.28% | 85,690 | 30,325 |
| 2012 | General | Nov. 6 | Julie M. Lassa (inc) | Democratic | 48,677 | 56.59% | Scott Kenneth Noble | Rep. | 37,259 | 43.31% | 86,024 | 11,418 |
| 2016 | General | Nov. 8 | Patrick Testin | Republican | 45,139 | 52.32% | Julie M. Lassa (inc) | Dem. | 41,091 | 47.63% | 86,275 | 4,048 |

=== U.S. House (2010) ===
Wisconsin's 7th Congressional District Election, 2010
| Party | Candidate | Votes | % | ±% |
|---|---|---|---|---|
Democratic Primary, September 14, 2010
| Democratic | Julie M. Lassa | 28,585 | 85.27% | |
| Democratic | Don Raihala | 4,920 | 14.68% | |
| Write-in | | 16 | 0.05% | |
| Plurality | | 23,665 | 70.60% | |
| Total votes | | 33,521 | 100.0% | |
General Election, November 2, 2010
| Republican | Sean Duffy | 132,551 | 52.11% | +12.96pp |
| Democratic | Lena C. Taylor | 113,018 | 44.43% | −16.36pp |
| Independent | Gary Kauther | 8,397 | 3.30% | |
| Write-in | | 423 | 0.17% | |
| Plurality | | 19,533 | 17.50% | -13.97pp |
| Total votes | | 254,389 | 100.0% | -27.28% |
| Republican gain from Democratic | | | | |

Wisconsin State Assembly
| Preceded by William Murat | Member of the Wisconsin State Assembly from the 71st district January 2, 1999 – May 9, 2003 | Succeeded by Louis Molepske |
Wisconsin Senate
| Preceded by Kevin Shibilski | Member of the Wisconsin Senate from the 24th district May 9, 2003 – January 3, 2017 | Succeeded by Patrick Testin |
