= 2020 United States House of Representatives elections in Wisconsin =

- November 3, 2020

All 8 Wisconsin seats to the United States House of Representatives
	Majority party	Minority party
Party	Republican	Democratic
Last election	5	3
Seats won	5	3
Seat change	Steady	Steady
Popular vote	1,661,399	1,566,671
Percentage	51.43%	48.50%
Swing	▲5.82%	▼4.68%

Republican
50–60%
60–70%
70–80%
Democratic
50–60%
60–70%
70–80%

The 2020 United States House of Representatives elections in Wisconsin were held on November 3, 2020, to elect the eight U.S. representatives from the state of Wisconsin, one from each of the state's eight congressional districts. The elections coincided with the 2020 U.S. presidential election, as well as other elections to the House of Representatives, elections to the United States Senate and various state and local elections. Primaries were held on August 11, 2020.

Wisconsin Republican candidates for the U.S. House received a higher combined total of votes than Donald Trump did in his election in the state.

== Overview ==
=== District ===
Results of the 2020 United States House of Representatives elections in Wisconsin by district:

District	Democratic		Republican		Others		Total		Result
District	Votes	%	Votes	%	Votes	%	Votes	%	Result
District 1	163,170	40.61%	238,271	59.31%	313	0.08%	401,754	100.00%	Republican hold
District 2	318,523	69.67%	138,306	30.25%	376	0.08%	457,205	100.00%	Democratic hold
District 3	199,870	51.30%	189,524	48.64%	224	0.06%	389,618	100.00%	Democratic hold
District 4	232,668	74.65%	70,769	22.70%	8,260	2.65%	311,697	100.00%	Democratic hold
District 5	175,902	39.83%	265,434	60.11%	263	0.06%	441,599	100.00%	Republican hold
District 6	164,239	40.72%	238,874	59.23%	220	0.05%	403,333	100.00%	Republican hold
District 7	162,741	39.21%	252,048	60.73%	218	0.05%	415,007	100.00%	Republican hold
District 8	149,558	35.79%	268,173	64.18%	107	0.03%	417,838	100.00%	Republican hold
Total	1,566,671	48.50%	1,661,399	51.43%	9,981	0.07%	3,238,051	100.00%	

Popular vote
Republican	51.43%
Democratic	48.50%
Other	0.07%

House seats
Republican	62.50%
Democratic	37.50%

== District 1 ==
2020 Wisconsin's 1st congressional district election
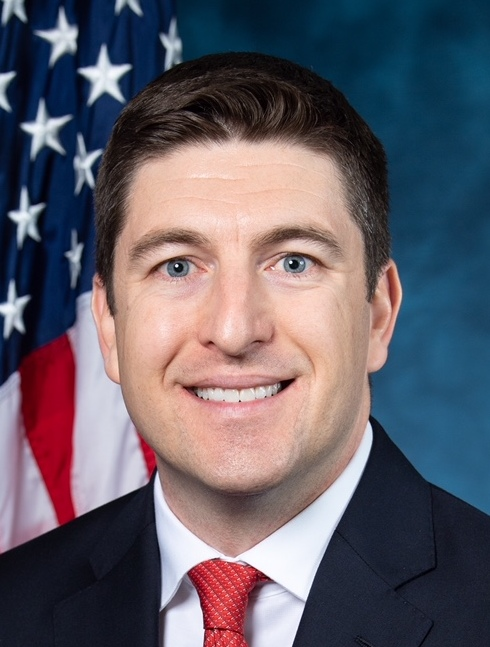

Nominee	Bryan Steil	Roger Polack
Party	Republican	Democratic
Popular vote	238,271	163,170
Percentage	59.3%	40.6%
- Steil: 50–60% 60–70% 70–80% >90% Pollack: 50–60% 60–70% 70–80% 80–90% >90% Tie: 40–50% 50% No votes
U.S. Representative before election
Bryan Steil
Republican
Elected U.S. Representative
Bryan Steil
Republican

The 1st district is based in southeastern Wisconsin, taking in Janesville, Kenosha, and Racine. The incumbent was Republican Bryan Steil, who was elected with 54.6% of the vote in 2018.

=== Republican primary ===
==== Candidates ====
===== Nominee =====
- Bryan Steil, incumbent U.S. Representative

==== Primary results ====
Republican primary results
Party	Candidate	Votes	%
Republican	Bryan Steil (incumbent)	40,273	100.0
Total votes		40,273	100.0

=== Democratic primary ===
==== Candidates ====
===== Nominee =====
- Roger Polack, former Intelligence Analyst at the United States Department of the Treasury

===== Eliminated in primary =====
- Josh Pade, attorney and candidate for Governor of Wisconsin in 2018

==== Primary results ====
Democratic primary results
Party	Candidate	Votes	%
Democratic	Roger Polack	28,698	58.2
Democratic	Josh Pade	20,608	41.8
Total votes		49,306	100.0

=== General election ===
==== Predictions ====
Source	Ranking	As of
The Cook Political Report	Safe R	July 2, 2020
Inside Elections	Safe R	June 2, 2020
Sabato's Crystal Ball	Safe R	July 2, 2020
Politico	Likely R	April 19, 2020
Daily Kos	Safe R	June 3, 2020
RCP	Safe R	June 9, 2020
Niskanen	Safe R	June 7, 2020

==== Polling ====
Poll source	Date(s) administered	Sample size (Note: Key: A – all adults RV – registered voters LV – likely voters V – unclear)	Margin of error	Bryan Steil (R)	Roger Polack (D)	Other/ Undecided
Public Policy Polling (D) (Note: Poll sponsored by Polack's campaign)	July 9–10, 2020	1,007 (V)	± 3.1%	49%	39%	12%

==== Results ====
Wisconsin's 1st congressional district, 2020
Party	Candidate	Votes	%
Republican	Bryan Steil (incumbent)	238,271	59.3
Democratic	Roger Polack	163,170	40.6
Write-in		313	0.1
Total votes		401,754	100.0
Republican hold			

== District 2 ==
2020 Wisconsin's 2nd congressional district election
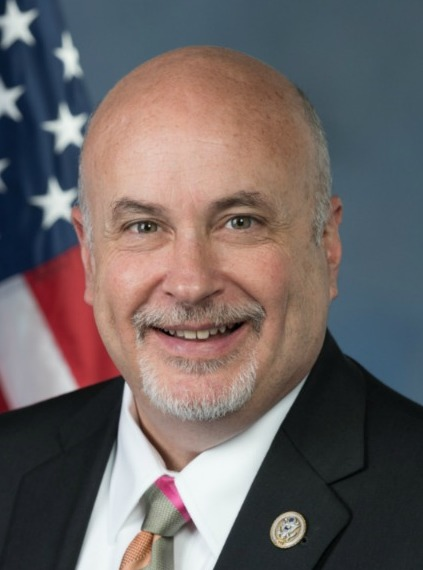

Nominee	Mark Pocan	Peter Theron
Party	Democratic	Republican
Popular vote	318,523	138,306
Percentage	69.7%	30.2%
- Pocan: 50–60% 60–70% 70–80% 80–90% >90% Theron: 50–60% 60–70% 70–80% >90% Tie: 50% No votes
U.S. Representative before election
Mark Pocan
Democratic
Elected U.S. Representative
Mark Pocan
Democratic

The 2nd congressional district covers Dane County, Iowa County, Lafayette County, Sauk County and Green County, as well as portions of Richland County and Rock County. The district includes Madison, the state's capital, its suburbs and some of the surrounding areas. The incumbent was Democrat Mark Pocan, who was elected with 97% of the vote in 2018, without major-party opposition.

=== Democratic primary ===
==== Candidates ====
===== Declared =====
- Mark Pocan, incumbent U.S. Representative

==== Primary results ====
Democratic primary results
Party	Candidate	Votes	%
Democratic	Mark Pocan (incumbent)	120,353	100.0
Total votes		120,353	100.0

=== Republican primary ===
==== Candidates ====
===== Declared =====
- Peter Theron, nominee for this seat in 2008, 2014 and 2016

==== Primary results ====
Republican primary results
Party	Candidate	Votes	%
Republican	Peter Theron	18,812	100.0
Total votes		18,812	100.0

=== General election ===
==== Predictions ====
Source	Ranking	As of
The Cook Political Report	Safe D	July 2, 2020
Inside Elections	Safe D	June 2, 2020
Sabato's Crystal Ball	Safe D	July 2, 2020
Politico	Safe D	April 19, 2020
Daily Kos	Safe D	June 3, 2020
RCP	Safe D	June 9, 2020
Niskanen	Safe D	June 7, 2020

==== Results ====
Wisconsin's 2nd congressional district, 2020
Party	Candidate	Votes	%
Democratic	Mark Pocan (incumbent)	318,523	69.7
Republican	Peter Theron	138,306	30.2
Write-in		376	0.1
Total votes		457,205	100.0
Democratic hold			

== District 3 ==
2020 Wisconsin's 3rd congressional district election
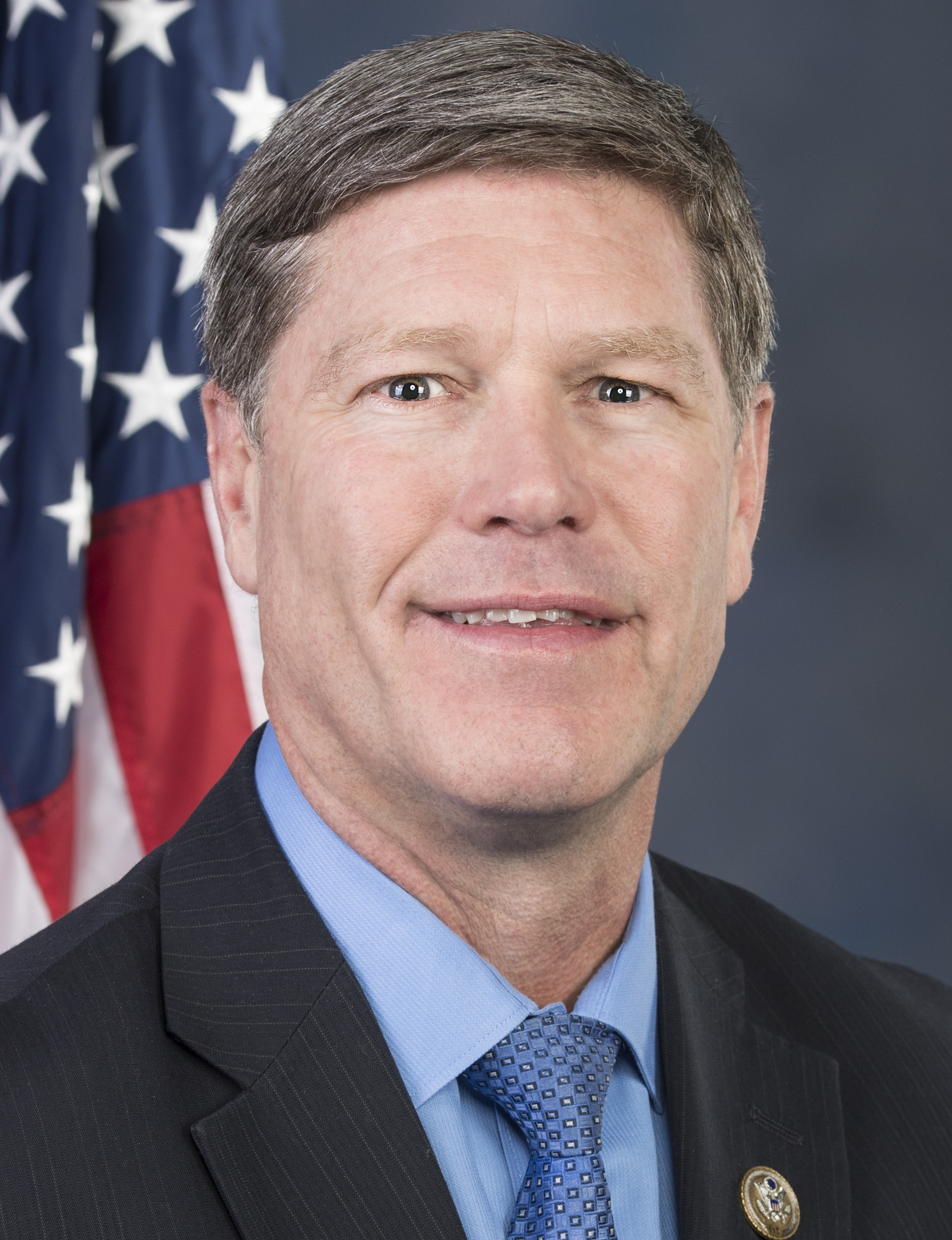

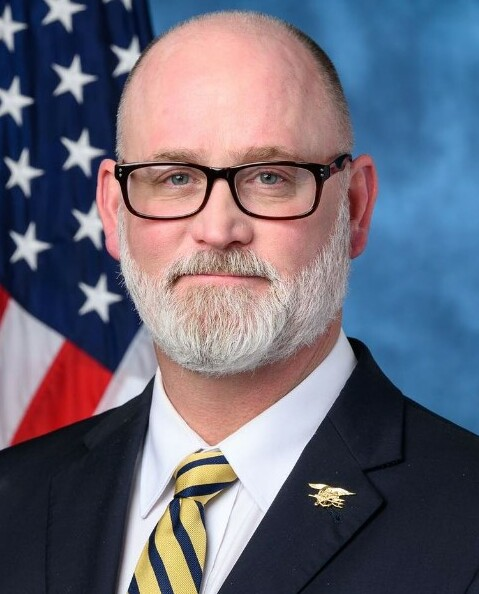
Nominee	Ron Kind	Derrick Van Orden
Party	Democratic	Republican
Popular vote	199,870	189,524
Percentage	51.3%	48.6%
- Kind: 40–50% 50–60% 60–70% 70–80% 80–90% 90–100% Van Orden: 40–50% 50–60% 60–70% 70–80%
U.S. Representative before election
Ron Kind
Democratic
Elected U.S. Representative
Ron Kind
Democratic

The 3rd district takes in the Driftless Area in southwestern Wisconsin including Eau Claire and La Crosse. The incumbent was Democrat Ron Kind, who was reelected with 59.7% of the vote in 2018.

=== Democratic primary ===
==== Candidates ====
===== Nominee =====
- Ron Kind, incumbent U.S. Representative

===== Eliminated in primary =====
- Mark Neumann, retired pediatrician

===== Withdrew =====
- Justin Bonner, software engineer

==== Primary results ====
Democratic primary results
Party	Candidate	Votes	%
Democratic	Ron Kind (incumbent)	53,064	80.6
Democratic	Mark Neumann	12,765	19.4
Total votes		65,829	100.0

=== Republican primary ===
==== Candidates ====
===== Nominee =====
- Derrick Van Orden, retired Navy SEAL

===== Eliminated in primary =====
- Jessi Ebben, public relations professional

===== Declined =====
- Patrick Testin, state senator
- Steve Toft, U.S. Army veteran and nominee for Wisconsin's 3rd congressional district in 2018

==== Primary results ====
Republican primary results
Party	Candidate	Votes	%
Republican	Derrick Van Orden	36,395	65.9
Republican	Jessi Ebben	18,835	34.1
Total votes		55,230	100.0

=== General election ===
==== Predictions ====
Source	Ranking	As of
The Cook Political Report	Lean D	September 29, 2020
Inside Elections	Safe D	October 28, 2020
Sabato's Crystal Ball	Likely D	July 22, 2020
Politico	Lean D	October 11, 2020
Daily Kos	Safe D	June 3, 2020
RCP	Likely D	June 9, 2020
Niskanen	Safe D	June 7, 2020

Hypothetical polling

with Patrick Testin (R)

Poll source	Date(s) administered	Sample size	Margin of error	Ron Kind (D)	Patrick Testin (R)	Undecided
NRCC (R) (Note: Poll conducted on behalf of National Republican Congressional Committee)	July 7–11, 2019	400 (LV)	± 4.9%	43%	45%	12%

==== Results ====
Wisconsin's 3rd congressional district, 2020
Party	Candidate	Votes	%
Democratic	Ron Kind (incumbent)	199,870	51.3
Republican	Derrick Van Orden	189,524	48.6
Write-in		224	0.1
Total votes		389,618	100.0
Democratic hold			

== District 4 ==
2020 Wisconsin's 4th congressional district election
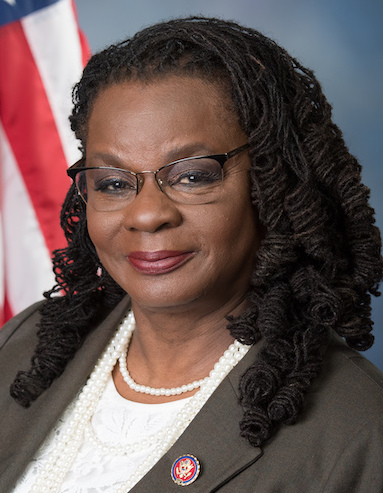

Nominee	Gwen Moore	Tim Rogers
Party	Democratic	Republican
Popular vote	232,668	70,769
Percentage	74.7%	22.7%
- Precinct results Moore: 40–50% 50–60% 60–70% 70–80% 80–90% >90% Rogers: 40–50% 50–60% 60–70% Tie: 40–50% No votes
U.S. Representative before election
Gwen Moore
Democratic
Elected U.S. Representative
Gwen Moore
Democratic

The 4th district encompasses Milwaukee County, taking in the city of Milwaukee and its working-class suburbs of Cudahy, St. Francis, South Milwaukee, and West Milwaukee, as well as the North Shore communities of Glendale, Shorewood, Whitefish Bay, Fox Point, Bayside, and Brown Deer. The incumbent was Democrat Gwen Moore, who was reelected with 75.6% of the vote in 2018.

=== Democratic primary ===
==== Candidates ====
===== Nominee =====
- Gwen Moore, incumbent U.S. Representative

==== Primary results ====
Democratic primary results
Party	Candidate	Votes	%
Democratic	Gwen Moore (incumbent)	68,898	100.0
Total votes		68,898	100.0

=== Republican primary ===
==== Candidates ====
===== Declared =====
- Tim Rogers, nominee for this district in 2018
- Cindy Werner, businesswoman and candidate for this district in 2018

==== Primary results ====
Republican primary results
Party	Candidate	Votes	%
Republican	Tim Rogers	6,685	50.3
Republican	Cindy Werner	6,598	49.7
Total votes		13,283	100.0

=== General election ===
==== Predictions ====
Source	Ranking	As of
The Cook Political Report	Safe D	July 2, 2020
Inside Elections	Safe D	June 2, 2020
Sabato's Crystal Ball	Safe D	July 2, 2020
Politico	Safe D	April 19, 2020
Daily Kos	Safe D	June 3, 2020
RCP	Safe D	June 9, 2020
Niskanen	Safe D	June 7, 2020

==== Results ====
Wisconsin's 4th congressional district, 2020
Party	Candidate	Votes	%
Democratic	Gwen Moore (incumbent)	232,668	74.7
Republican	Tim Rogers	70,769	22.7
Independent	Robert Raymond	7,911	2.5
Write-in		349	0.1
Total votes		311,697	100.0
Democratic hold			

== District 5 ==
2020 Wisconsin's 5th congressional district election
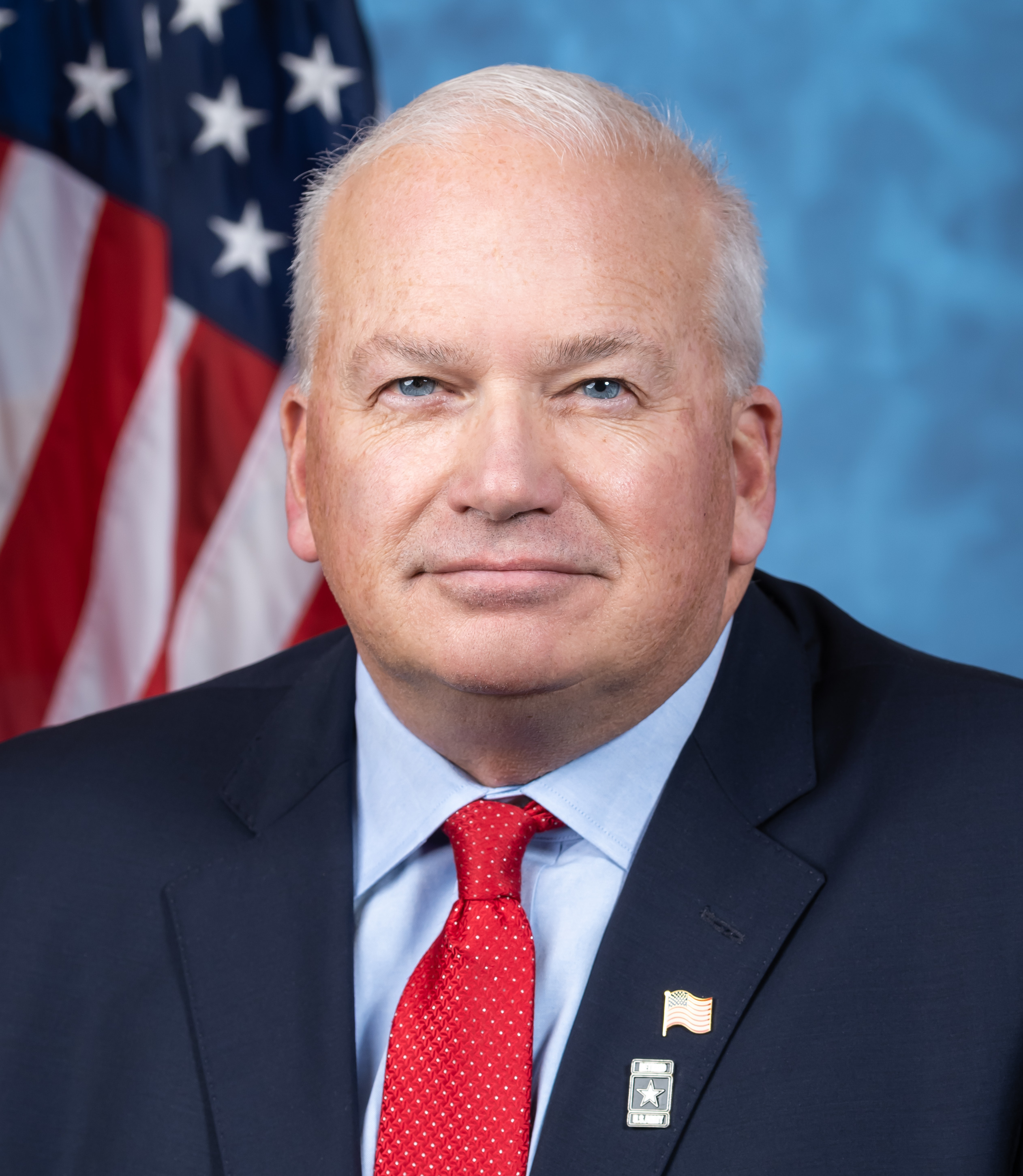

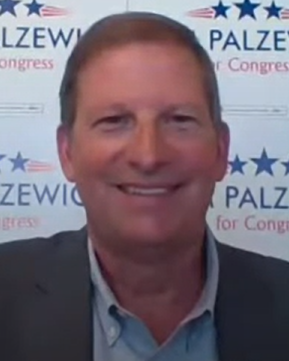
Nominee	Scott L. Fitzgerald	Tom Palzewicz
Party	Republican	Democratic
Popular vote	265,434	175,902
Percentage	60.1%	39.8%
- Fitzgerald: 50–60% 60–70% 70–80% 80–90% >90% Palzewicz: 50–60% 60–70% 70–80% Tie: 50% No votes
U.S. Representative before election
Jim Sensenbrenner
Republican
Elected U.S. Representative
Scott L. Fitzgerald
Republican

The 5th district takes in the northern and western suburbs of Milwaukee, including Washington County, Jefferson County, as well as most of Waukesha County. The incumbent was Republican Jim Sensenbrenner, who was reelected with 61.9% of the vote in 2018. Sensenbrenner announced on September 4, 2019, that he would not seek re-election.

=== Republican primary ===
==== Candidates ====
===== Nominee =====
- Scott Fitzgerald, majority leader of the Wisconsin Senate

===== Eliminated in primary =====
- Cliff DeTemple, U.S. Coast Guard Reserve Commander

==== Declined ====
- Scott Allen, state representative
- Paul Farrow, Waukesha County executive
- Chris Kapenga, state senator
- Rebecca Kleefisch, former lieutenant governor of Wisconsin
- Dale Kooyenga, state senator
- Matt Neumann, businessman and son of former U.S. Representative Mark Neumann
- Adam Neylon, state representative
- Kevin Nicholson, businessman and candidate for U.S. Senate in 2018 (endorsed Fitzgerald)
- Jim Sensenbrenner, incumbent U.S. representative
- Vince Trovato, Wisconsin campaign staff for President Donald Trump's 2016 presidential campaign
- Ben Voekel, spokesman for U.S. Senator Ron Johnson
- Leah Vukmir, former state senator and nominee for U.S. Senate in 2018
- Matt Walker, digital strategy consultant and son of former governor of Wisconsin Scott Walker

==== Endorsements ====
Scott Fitzgerald

Statewide politicians

- Tommy Thompson, former U.S. Secretary of Health and Human Services and Governor of Wisconsin.

==== Primary results ====
Republican primary results
Party	Candidate	Votes	%
Republican	Scott Fitzgerald	60,676	77.3
Republican	Cliff DeTemple	17,829	22.7
Total votes		78,505	100.0

=== Democratic primary ===
==== Candidates ====
===== Declared =====
- Tom Palzewicz, U.S. Navy veteran and nominee for Wisconsin's 5th congressional district in 2018

==== Endorsements ====
Tom Palzewicz

Organizations

- DUH! Demand Universal Healthcare
- Sierra Club

==== Primary results ====
Democratic primary results
Party	Candidate	Votes	%
Democratic	Tom Palzewicz	43,710	100.0
Total votes		43,710	100.0

=== General election ===
==== Predictions ====
Source	Ranking	As of
The Cook Political Report	Safe R	July 2, 2020
Inside Elections	Safe R	June 2, 2020
Sabato's Crystal Ball	Safe R	July 2, 2020
Politico	Safe R	April 19, 2020
Daily Kos	Safe R	June 3, 2020
RCP	Safe R	June 9, 2020
Niskanen	Safe R	June 7, 2020

==== Results ====
Wisconsin's 5th congressional district, 2020
Party	Candidate	Votes	%
Republican	Scott Fitzgerald	265,434	60.1
Democratic	Tom Palzewicz	175,902	39.8
Write-in		263	0.1
Total votes		441,599	100.0
Republican hold			

== District 6 ==
2020 Wisconsin's 6th congressional district election
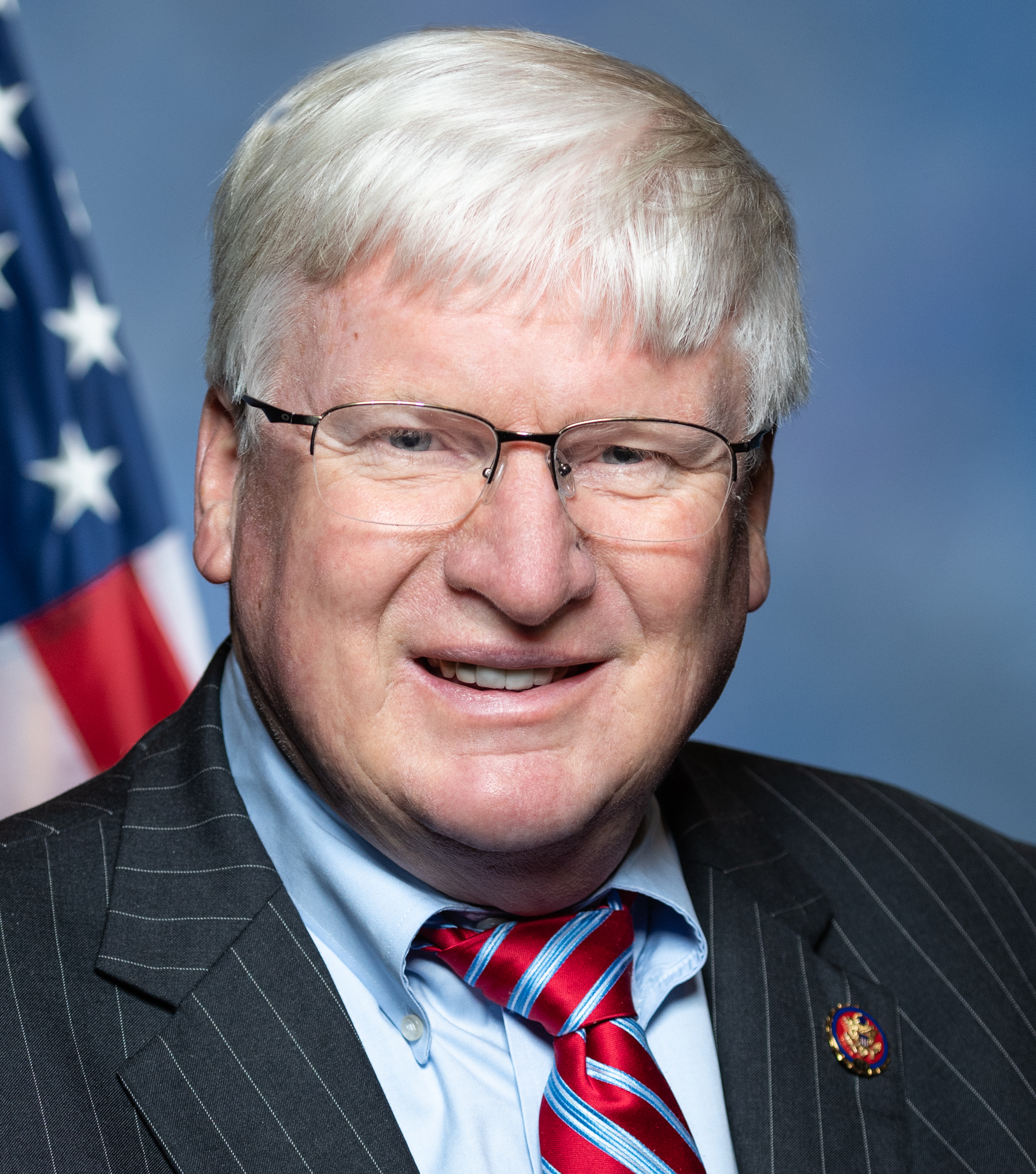

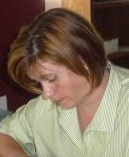
Nominee	Glenn Grothman	Jessica King
Party	Republican	Democratic
Popular vote	238,874	164,239
Percentage	59.2%	40.7%
- Grothman: 50–60% 60–70% 70–80% 80–90% >90% King: 50–60% 60–70% 80–90% >90% Tie: 40–50% 50% No votes
U.S. Representative before election
Glenn Grothman
Republican
Elected U.S. Representative
Glenn Grothman
Republican

The 6th district is based in east-central Wisconsin, encompassing part of the Fox River Valley, and takes in Fond du Lac, Oshkosh, and Sheboygan. The incumbent was Republican Glenn Grothman, who was reelected with 55.4% of the vote in 2018.

=== Republican primary ===
==== Candidates ====
===== Nominee =====
- Glenn Grothman, incumbent U.S. Representative

===== Withdrawn =====
- Melissa McClintick, clinical coder

==== Primary results ====
Republican primary results
Party	Candidate	Votes	%
Republican	Glenn Grothman (incumbent)	52,247	100.0
Total votes		52,247	100.0

=== Democratic primary ===
==== Candidates ====
===== Nominee =====
- Jessica King, former state senator

===== Eliminated in primary =====
- Miachael Beardsley, IT consultant and board member for Our Wisconsin Revolution
- Matt Boor, businessman

==== Primary results ====
Democratic primary results
Party	Candidate	Votes	%
Democratic	Jessica King	38,043	75.9
Democratic	Miachael Beardsley	7,896	15.8
Democratic	Matt Boor	4,165	8.3
Total votes		50,104	100.0

=== General election ===
==== Predictions ====
Source	Ranking	As of
The Cook Political Report	Safe R	July 2, 2020
Inside Elections	Safe R	June 2, 2020
Sabato's Crystal Ball	Safe R	July 2, 2020
Politico	Likely R	April 19, 2020
Daily Kos	Safe R	June 3, 2020
RCP	Safe R	June 9, 2020
Niskanen	Safe R	June 7, 2020

==== Results ====
Wisconsin's 6th congressional district, 2020
Party	Candidate	Votes	%
Republican	Glenn Grothman (incumbent)	238,874	59.2
Democratic	Jessica King	164,239	40.7
Write-in		220	0.1
Total votes		403,333	100.0
Republican hold			

== District 7 ==
2020 Wisconsin's 7th congressional district election
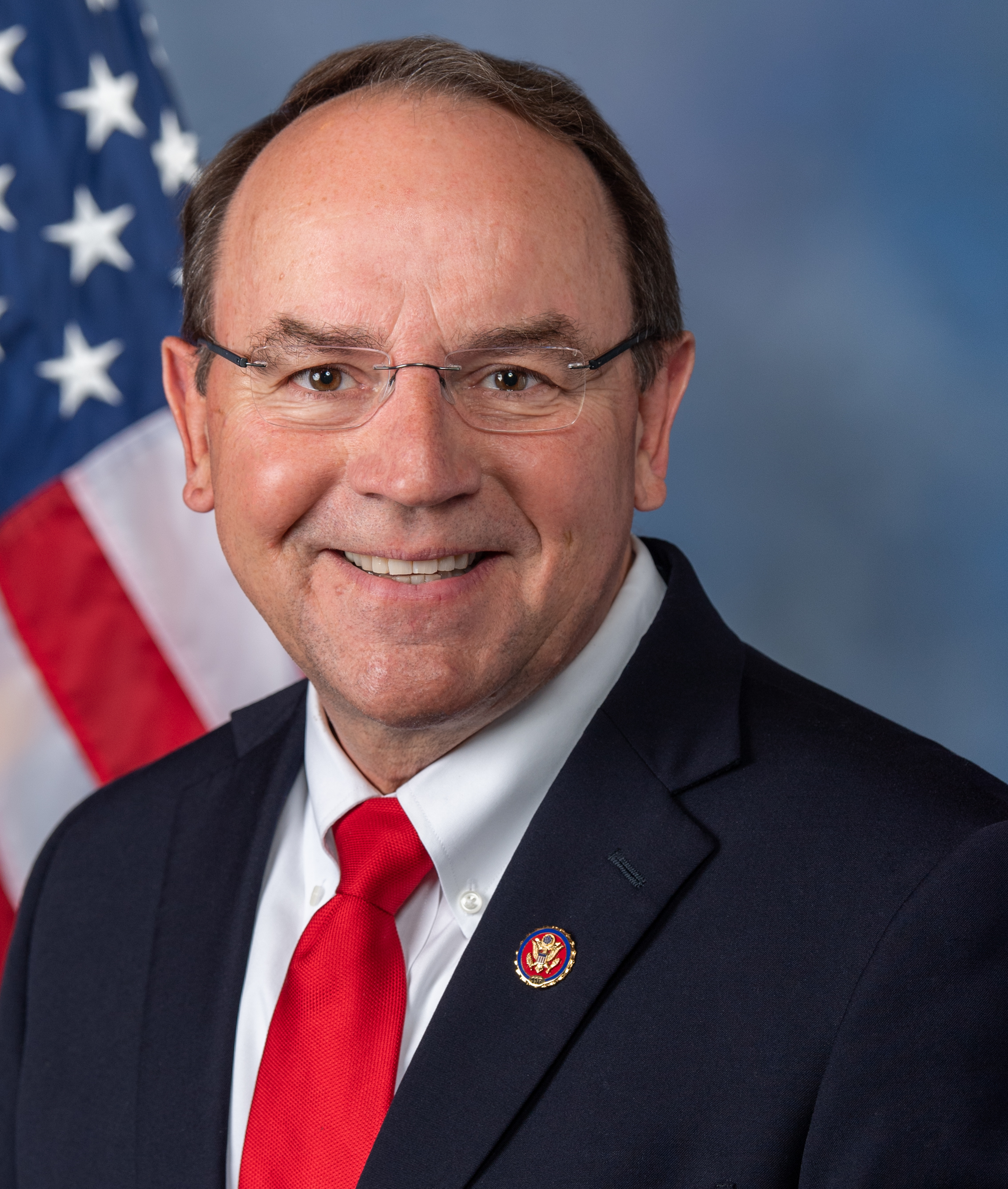

Nominee	Tom Tiffany	Tricia Zunker
Party	Republican	Democratic
Popular vote	252,048	162,741
Percentage	60.7%	39.2%
- Tiffany: 50–60% 60–70% 70–80% 80–90% >90% Zunker: 50–60% 60–70% 70–80% 80–90% >90% Tie: 50% No votes
U.S. Representative before election
Tom Tiffany
Republican
Elected U.S. Representative
Tom Tiffany
Republican

The 7th district is located in northwestern Wisconsin and includes Wausau and Superior. After the September 2019 resignation of Sean Duffy, Republican Tom Tiffany won a May 2020 special election to serve out the remainder of Duffy's term with 57.2% of the vote.

=== Republican primary ===
==== Candidates ====
===== Declared =====
- Tom Tiffany, incumbent U.S. representative

==== Primary results ====
Republican primary results
Party	Candidate	Votes	%
Republican	Tom Tiffany (incumbent)	62,142	100.0
Total votes		62,142	100.0

=== Democratic primary ===
==== Candidates ====
===== Declared =====
- Tricia Zunker, president of the Wausau School Board, Associate Justice of the Ho-Chunk Nation Supreme Court, and nominee for Wisconsin's 7th congressional district in the 2020 special election

==== Primary results ====
Democratic primary results
Party	Candidate	Votes	%
Democratic	Tricia Zunker	51,139	100.0
Total votes		51,139	100.0

=== Predictions ===
Source	Ranking	As of
The Cook Political Report	Safe R	July 2, 2020
Inside Elections	Safe R	June 2, 2020
Sabato's Crystal Ball	Safe R	July 2, 2020
Politico	Likely R	October 11, 2020
Daily Kos	Safe R	June 3, 2020
RCP	Safe R	June 9, 2020
Niskanen	Safe R	June 7, 2020

==== Results ====
Wisconsin's 7th congressional district, 2020
Party	Candidate	Votes	%
Republican	Tom Tiffany (incumbent)	252,048	60.7
Democratic	Tricia Zunker	162,741	39.2
Write-in		218	0.1
Total votes		415,007	100.0
Republican hold			

== District 8 ==
2020 Wisconsin's 8th congressional district election
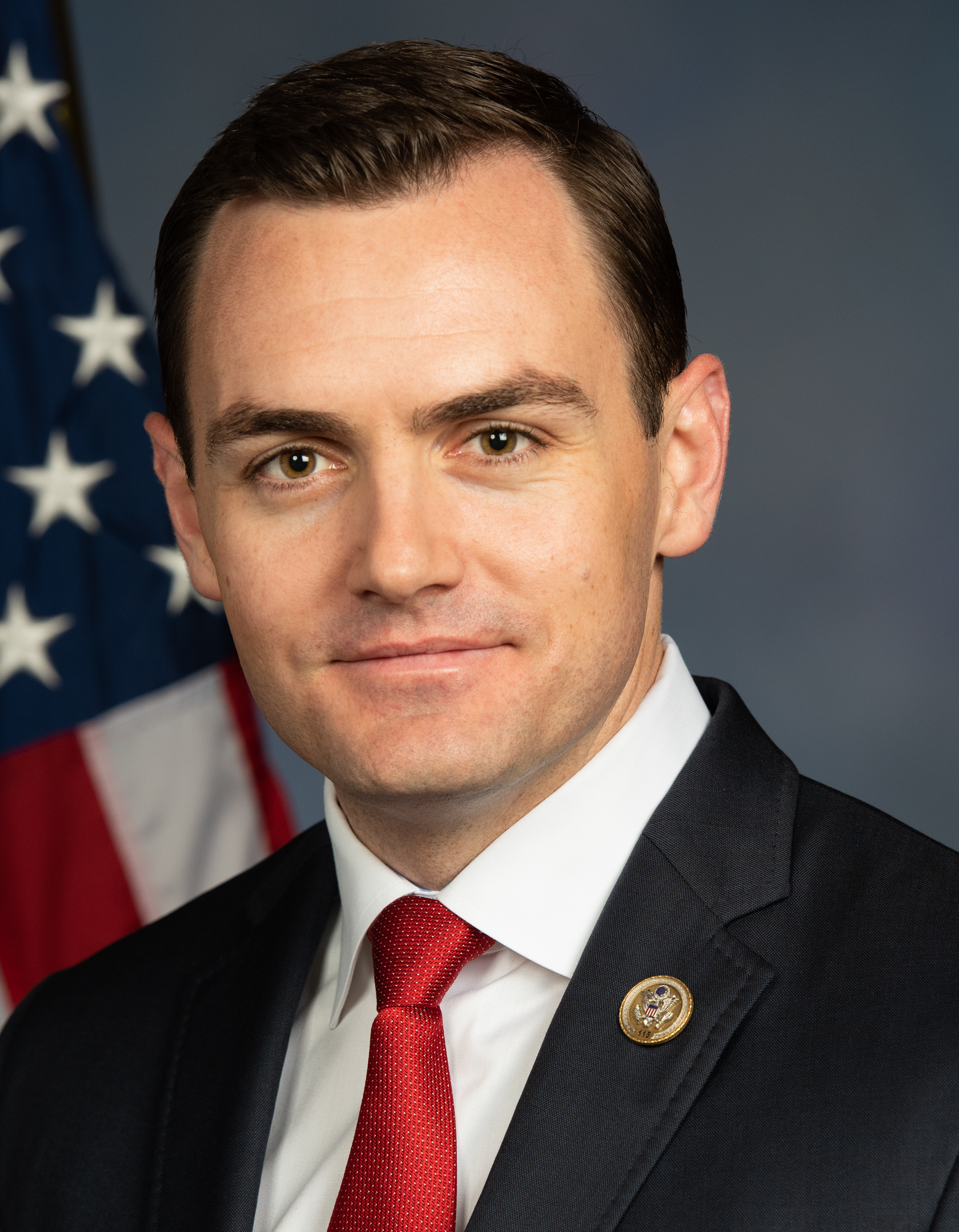

Nominee	Mike Gallagher	Amanda Stuck
Party	Republican	Democratic
Popular vote	268,173	149,558
Percentage	64.18%	35.79%
- Gallagher: 50–60% 60–70% 70–80% 80–90% >90% Stuck: 50–60% 60–70% 70–80% >90% Tie: 40–50% 50% No votes
U.S. Representative before election
Mike Gallagher
Republican
Elected U.S. Representative
Mike Gallagher
Republican

The 8th district encompasses northeastern Wisconsin, including Green Bay and Appleton. The incumbent was Republican Mike Gallagher, who was reelected with 63.7% of the vote in 2018.

=== Republican primary ===
==== Candidates ====
===== Declared =====
- Mike Gallagher, incumbent U.S. Representative

==== Primary results ====
Republican primary results
Party	Candidate	Votes	%
Republican	Mike Gallagher (incumbent)	50,176	100.0
Total votes		50,176	100.0

=== Democratic primary ===
==== Candidates ====
===== Declared =====
- Amanda Stuck, state representative

==== Primary results ====
Democratic primary results
Party	Candidate	Votes	%
Democratic	Amanda Stuck	44,793	100.0
Total votes		44,793	100.0

==== Endorsements ====
Mike Gallagher (R)

Organizations

- Combat Veterans for Congress
Amanda Stuck (D)

Organizations

- National Women's Political Caucus
- Sierra Club

=== General election ===
==== Predictions ====
Source	Ranking	As of
The Cook Political Report	Safe R	July 2, 2020
Inside Elections	Safe R	June 2, 2020
Sabato's Crystal Ball	Safe R	July 2, 2020
Politico	Safe R	April 19, 2020
Daily Kos	Safe R	June 3, 2020
RCP	Safe R	June 9, 2020
Niskanen	Safe R	June 7, 2020

==== Results ====
Wisconsin's 8th congressional district, 2020
Party	Candidate	Votes	%
Republican	Mike Gallagher (incumbent)	268,173	64.2
Democratic	Amanda Stuck	149,558	35.8
Write-in		107	0.0
Total votes		417,838	100.0
Republican hold			

== See also ==
- Voter suppression in the United States 2019–2020: Wisconsin
- 2020 Wisconsin elections

== Notes ==
Partisan clients
