= Wisconsin's 71st Assembly district =

American legislative district in central Wisconsin

Wisconsin's 71st State Assembly district
- 2024 map defined in 2023 Wisc. Act 94; 2022 map defined in Johnson v. Wisconsin Elections Commission; 2011 map was defined in 2011 Wisc. Act 43
Assemblymember
Vinnie Miresse; D–Stevens Point
since January 6, 2025 (1 years)
- Demographics: 89.32% White; 1.86% Black; 3.13% Hispanic; 3.76% Asian; 1.51% Native American; 0.13% Hawaiian/Pacific Islander
- Population (2020) • Voting age: 59,463; 47,994
- Website: Official website
- Notes: Central Wisconsin

The 71st Assembly district of Wisconsin is one of 99 districts in the Wisconsin State Assembly. Located in central Wisconsin, the district comprises most of Portage County and part of northeast Adams County. It includes the city of Stevens Point and the villages of Amherst, Amherst Junction, Nelsonville, Plover, and Whiting. The district also contains the University of Wisconsin–Stevens Point campus. The district is represented by Democrat Vinnie Miresse, since January 2025.

The 71st Assembly district is located within Wisconsin's 24th Senate district, along with the 70th and 72nd Assembly districts.

== History ==
The district was created in the 1972 redistricting act (1971 Wisc. Act 304) which first established the numbered district system, replacing the previous system which allocated districts to specific counties. The 71st district was drawn roughly in line with the boundaries of the former Portage County district, comprising nearly all of Portage County except for the northwest corner. Since its creation, the 71st district has always been the Assembly district for the city of Stevens Point and most of Portage County, except for the 1982 court-ordered redistricting which moved the district to Ozaukee and Sheboygan counties for the 1983–1984 term.

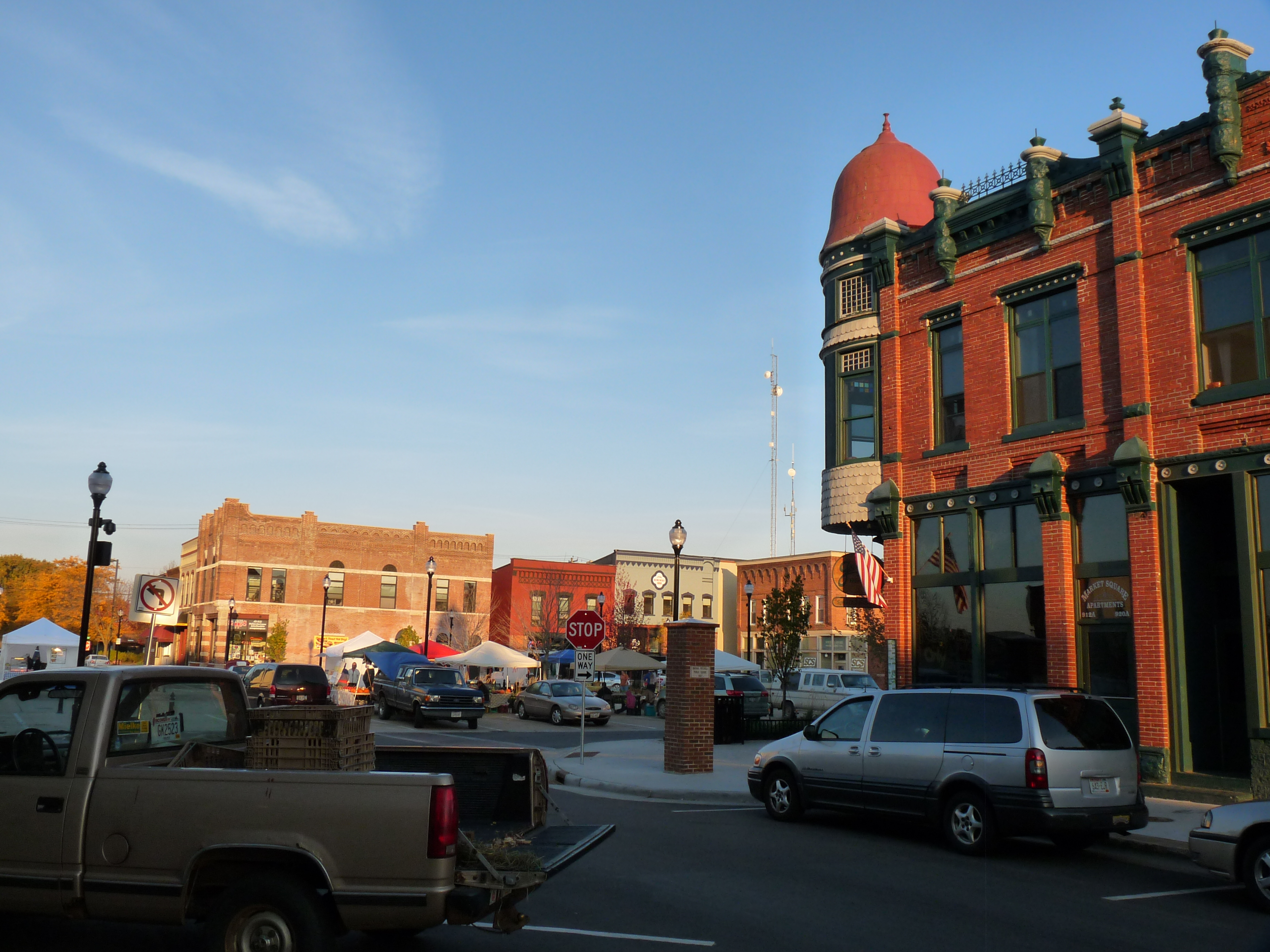
Matthias Mitchell public square in downtown Stevens Point

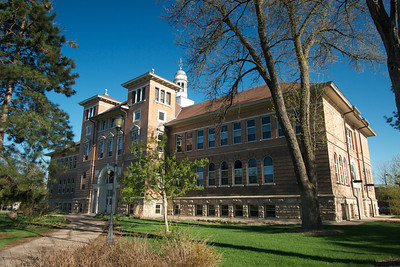
Old Main building on the University of Wisconsin–Stevens Point campus

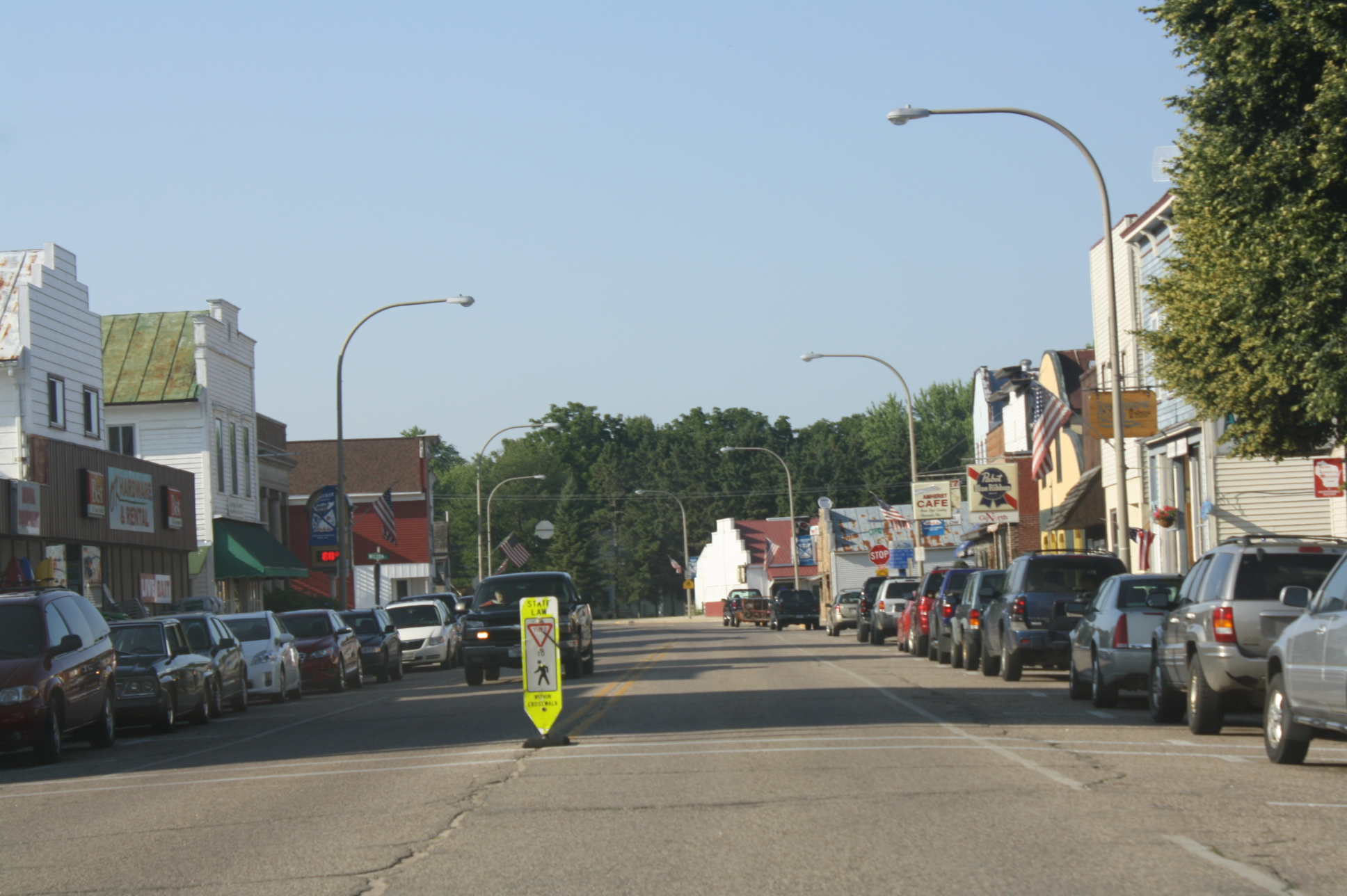
Amherst, Wisconsin

== List of past representatives ==
List of representatives to the Wisconsin State Assembly from the 71st district
Member	Party	Residence	Counties represented	Term start	Term end	Ref.
District created
Leonard A. Groshek	Dem.	Stevens Point	Portage	January 1, 1973	January 1, 1979	
David Helbach	Dem.	Stevens Point	Portage	January 1, 1979	January 3, 1983	
Donald K. Stitt	Rep.	Port Washington	Ozaukee, Sheboygan	January 3, 1983	January 7, 1985	
Stan Gruszynski	Dem.	Stevens Point	Portage, Waupaca	January 7, 1985	January 2, 1995	
Stan Gruszynski	Dem.	Stevens Point	Portage, Waushara	January 7, 1985	January 2, 1995	
William Murat	Dem.	Stevens Point	Portage, Waushara	January 2, 1995	January 4, 1999	
Julie Lassa	Dem.	Plover	Portage, Waushara	January 4, 1999	May 9, 2003	
--Vacant--			Portage, Waushara	May 9, 2003	August 11, 2003	
Louis Molepske	Dem.	Stevens Point	Portage, Waushara	August 11, 2003	January 7, 2013	
Katrina Shankland	Dem.	Stevens Point	Portage	January 7, 2013	January 6, 2025	
Vinnie Miresse	Dem.	Stevens Point	Adams, Portage	January 6, 2025	Current	

== Electoral history ==
Year	Date	Elected				Defeated				Total	Plurality	Other primary candidates
2012	Nov. 6	Katrina Shankland	Democratic	17,619	60.82%	Patrick Testin	Rep.	11,279	38.94%	28,968	6,340	Corey D. Ladick (Dem.); Jeri McGinkey (Dem.); Andrew Logan Beveridge (Dem.); David J. Verhage (Dem.); Tom Mallison (Dem.); Robert L. Steinke (Dem.); Laura Hauser-Menting (Dem.); Hans Schmid (Dem.)
2014	Nov. 4	Katrina Shankland (inc.)	Democratic	17,134	97.79%	--unopposed--				17,521	16,747	
2016	Nov. 8	Katrina Shankland (inc.)	Democratic	21,834	98.90%	--unopposed--				22,076	21,592	
2018	Nov. 6	Katrina Shankland (inc.)	Democratic	20,548	97.75%	--unopposed--				21,022	20,074	
2020	Nov. 3	Katrina Shankland (inc.)	Democratic	17,753	55.51%	Scott C. Soik	Rep.	14,206	44.42%	31,979	3,547	
2022	Nov. 8	Katrina Shankland (inc.)	Democratic	15,930	57.05%	Scott C. Soik	Rep.	11,976	42.89%	27,923	3,954	
2024	Nov. 5	Vinnie Miresse	Democratic	18,631	53.13%	Bob Pahmeier	Rep.	16,416	46.82%	35,065	2,215	
