= Louis Molepske =

21st century American politician and attorney

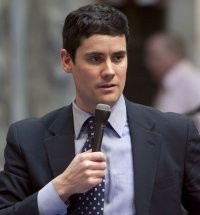

Wisconsin Circuit Court Judge for the Portage Circuit, Branch 2
- Incumbent
- Assumed office August 1, 2022
- Preceded by: Robert J. Shannon

Portage County District Attorney
- In office January 7, 2013 – June 2022
- Preceded by: Thomas B. Eagon
- Succeeded by: Cass Cousins

Member of the Wisconsin State Assembly from the 71st district
- In office August 11, 2003 – January 7, 2013
- Preceded by: Julie Lassa
- Succeeded by: Katrina Shankland

Personal details
- Born: January 6, 1974 (age 52) Stevens Point, Wisconsin
- Party: Democratic
- Spouse: Raquel Lynn Vechinski (m. 2013)
- Children: 3
- Education: University of Wisconsin–Madison; Marquette University Law School
- Profession: attorney
- Website: Campaign website

Louis John Molepske Jr. (born January 6, 1974) is an American attorney, judge, and Democratic politician. He is a Wisconsin circuit court judge in Portage County, Wisconsin, since 2022. He previously served nine years as district attorney, and was a member of the Wisconsin State Assembly for ten years before that.

== Early life and education ==
Louis Molepske was born and raised in Stevens Point, Wisconsin. He graduated from Stevens Point Area Senior High School in 1993 and went on to earn his bachelor's degree in political science from the University of Wisconsin–Madison. He then attended Marquette University Law School, where he earned his J.D. in 2001. While in high school, he wrote for a student section included in the Stevens Point daily newspaper, the Stevens Point Journal.

== Political career ==
After completing law school, he went to work in the city government of Stevens Point. He first worked as an assistant to his father, the city attorney, and then as an assistant to the mayor, Gary Wescott, and finally as a special prosecutor in the office of the district attorney, Tom Eagon.

In 2002, incumbent state senator Kevin Shibilski was indicted for fraud, which led to his resignation and the election of state representative Julie Lassa as his replacement. Lassa's elevation created a vacancy in Wisconsin's 71st Assembly district, and Molepske chose to enter the race for the open seat. He narrowly prevailed in the low-turnout special election, receiving 37% of the vote in a four-way race. At the time he was sworn in, Molepske was the second youngest state legislator at 29 years old. He went on to win re-election four times.

In the April 2012 election, Molepske's former boss, district attorney Tom Eagon, was elected a Wisconsin circuit court judge. Molepske soon announced that, rather than running for another term in the Assembly, he would instead run for district attorney. He faced only one opponent in the race, the senior assistant district attorney, Veronica Isherwood, in the Democratic primary. Molepske won 65% of the vote in the primary and was unopposed in the general election. He was re-elected without opposition in 2016 and 2020.

In the Fall of 2021, incumbent Wisconsin circuit court judge Robert J. Shannon filed his paperwork to indicate he would not run for re-election in 2022. Molepske entered the race for the judicial post; he defeated attorney Stephen W. Sawyer in the Spring general election and was sworn in in August 2022.

== Personal life and family ==
Louis Molepske is a fifth-generation resident of Portage County, Wisconsin. His father is also an attorney and was in public office as city attorney of Stevens Point; his grandfather was a prominent realtor.

Louis Molepske married Raquel Vechinski, a nurse practitioner from Wisconsin Rapids, in October 2013. They have three children now and reside in Stevens Point.

== Electoral history ==
=== Wisconsin Assembly (2003–2010) ===
Wisconsin Assembly, 71st District Special Election, 2003
Party	Candidate	Votes	%	±%
Special Election, July 22, 2003
Democratic	Louis J. Molepske Jr.	2,628	37.09%	−35.33%
Republican	Jackie Szehner	2,492	35.17%	+7.68%
Green	Amy Heart	1,011	14.27%	
Democratic	Jo Seiser (write-in)	946	13.35%	
Write-in		9	0.13%	
Plurality		136	1.92%	-43.01%
Total votes		7,086	100.0%	-60.69%

=== Portage County District Attorney (2012, 2016, 2020) ===
Portage County, Wisconsin, District Attorney Election, 2012
Party	Candidate	Votes	%
Democratic Primary, August 14, 2012
Democratic	Louis J. Molepske Jr.	4,077	64.86%
Democratic	Veronica Isherwood	2,204	35.06%
Write-in		5	0.08%
Plurality		1,873	29.80%
Total votes		6,286	100.0%
General Election, November 6, 2012
Democratic	Louis J. Molepske Jr.	27,308	97.42%
Write-in		724	2.58%
Total votes		28,032	100.0%

=== Wisconsin Circuit Court Judge (2022) ===
Wisconsin Circuit Court Judge, Portage Circuit, Branch 2 Election, 2022
Party	Candidate	Votes	%
General Election, April 5, 2022
Nonpartisan	Louis J. Molepske Jr.	9,454	56.17%
Nonpartisan	Stephen W. Sawyer	7,357	43.71%
Write-in		21	0.12%
Plurality		2,097	12.46%
Total votes		16,832	100.0%

Wisconsin State Assembly
Preceded by Julie Lassa	Member of the Wisconsin State Assembly from the 71st district August 11, 2003 – January 7, 2013	Succeeded by Katrina Shankland
Legal offices
Preceded by Thomas B. Eagon	District Attorney of Portage County, Wisconsin; January 7, 2013 – June 2022	Succeeded by Cass Cousins
Preceded by Robert J. Shannon	Wisconsin Circuit Court Judge for the Portage Circuit, Branch 2 August 1, 2022 – present	Incumbent
