= Katrina Shankland =

American politician (born 1987)

Member of the Wisconsin State Assembly from the 71st district
- In office January 7, 2013 – January 6, 2025
- Preceded by: Louis Molepske
- Succeeded by: Vinnie Miresse

Personal details
- Born: August 4, 1987 (age 38) Wausau, Wisconsin, U.S.
- Party: Democratic
- Spouse: Jed
- Education: University of Wisconsin–Marathon County; Marquette University; University of Wisconsin–Madison (BA); University of Wisconsin–Stevens Point (MS)
- Website: State Assembly website; Campaign website

Katrina Shankland (born August 4, 1987) is an American community organizer and Democratic politician from Stevens Point, Wisconsin. She served six terms as a member of the Wisconsin State Assembly, representing the 71st Assembly district from 2013 to 2025.

She was an unsuccessful candidate for the Democratic nomination for U.S. House of Representatives in Wisconsin's 3rd congressional district in 2024.

== Biography ==
Shankland was born in Wausau, Wisconsin, in 1987, and raised in rural Wittenberg, Wisconsin. As a child, she participated in the Scripps National Spelling Bee after winning Wisconsin's Badger State Spelling Bee in 2000. She graduated from Wittenberg-Birnamwood High School in 2005 as valedictorian of her class. She went on to attend University of Wisconsin–Stevens Point at Wausau and Marquette University before earning her bachelor's degree in political science and Latin American studies from the University of Wisconsin–Madison in 2009. She continued her education after joining the Assembly, earning her master's degree in 2019 from the University of Wisconsin–Stevens Point.

After graduating from college, she was employed for several years as a coordinator for the Midwest Renewable Energy Association. She also became involved as a community organizer for the Democratic Party of Wisconsin and was active for the campaign of Milwaukee Mayor Tom Barrett in the 2012 Wisconsin gubernatorial recall election.

== Political career ==
Shankland entered the Democratic primary race for Wisconsin State Assembly in the 71st Assembly district, which ultimately attracted nine candidates. Shankland narrowly won with 27% of the vote in the August primary, with a winning margin of 44 votes. In the general election, she faced fellow first-time candidate Patrick Testin, carrying 60% of the vote and winning the seat for the 2013–2014 term. She was reelected without opposition in 2014, 2016, and 2018, and defeated challengers in 2020 and 2022 to win a fifth and sixth term.

On October 2, 2023, the Milwaukee Journal Sentinel reported that Shankland planned to launch a campaign for United States House of Representatives in 2024, challenging first-term Republican incumbent Derrick Van Orden in Wisconsin's 3rd congressional district. Shankland confirmed the news and officially announced her campaign for Congress the next day. She was defeated in the Democratic primary by Rebecca Cooke.

== Electoral history ==
=== Wisconsin Assembly (2012–2022) ===
Year	Election	Date	Elected				Defeated				Total	Plurality
2012	Primary	Aug. 14	Katrina Shankland	Democratic	1,383	26.96%	Corey D. Ladick	Dem.	1,339	26.10%	5,130	44
2012	Primary	Aug. 14	Katrina Shankland	Democratic	1,383	26.96%	Jeri McGinkey	Dem.	836	16.30%	5,130	44
2012	Primary	Aug. 14	Katrina Shankland	Democratic	1,383	26.96%	Andrew Logan Beveridge	Dem.	771	15.03%	5,130	44
2012	Primary	Aug. 14	Katrina Shankland	Democratic	1,383	26.96%	David J. Verhage	Dem.	319	6.22%	5,130	44
2012	Primary	Aug. 14	Katrina Shankland	Democratic	1,383	26.96%	Tom Mallison	Dem.	142	2.77%	5,130	44
2012	Primary	Aug. 14	Katrina Shankland	Democratic	1,383	26.96%	Robert L. Steinke	Dem.	118	2.30%	5,130	44
2012	Primary	Aug. 14	Katrina Shankland	Democratic	1,383	26.96%	Laura Hauser-Menting	Dem.	117	2.28%	5,130	44
2012	Primary	Aug. 14	Katrina Shankland	Democratic	1,383	26.96%	Hans Schmid	Dem.	101	1.97%	5,130	44
2012	General	Nov. 6	Katrina Shankland	Democratic	17,619	60.82%	Patrick Testin	Rep.	11,279	38.94%	28,968	6,340
2014	General	Nov. 4	Katrina Shankland (inc.)	Democratic	17,134	97.79%	--unopposed--				17,521	16,747
2016	General	Nov. 8	Katrina Shankland (inc.)	Democratic	21,834	98.90%	--unopposed--				22,076	21,592
2018	General	Nov. 6	Katrina Shankland (inc.)	Democratic	20,548	97.75%	--unopposed--				21,022	20,074
2020	General	Nov. 3	Katrina Shankland (inc.)	Democratic	17,753	55.51%	Scott C. Soik	Rep.	14,206	44.42%	31,979	3,547
2022	General	Nov. 8	Katrina Shankland (inc.)	Democratic	15,930	57.05%	Scott C. Soik	Rep.	11,976	42.89%	27,923	3,954

=== U.S. House of Representatives (2024) ===
Year	Election	Date	Elected				Defeated				Total	Plurality
2024	Primary	Aug. 13	Rebecca Cooke	Democratic	42,316	50.51%	Katrina Shankland	Dem.	34,812	41.55%	83,776	7,504
2024	Primary	Aug. 13	Rebecca Cooke	Democratic	42,316	50.51%	Eric Wilson	Dem.	6,624	7.91%	83,776	7,504

Wisconsin State Assembly
Preceded by Louis Molepske	Member of the Wisconsin State Assembly from the 71st district 2013–2025	Succeeded by Vinnie Miresse
