= 2008 Wisconsin Senate election =

2008 Wisconsin State Senate election
- November 4, 2008

16 of 33 seats in the Wisconsin Senate 17 seats needed for a majority
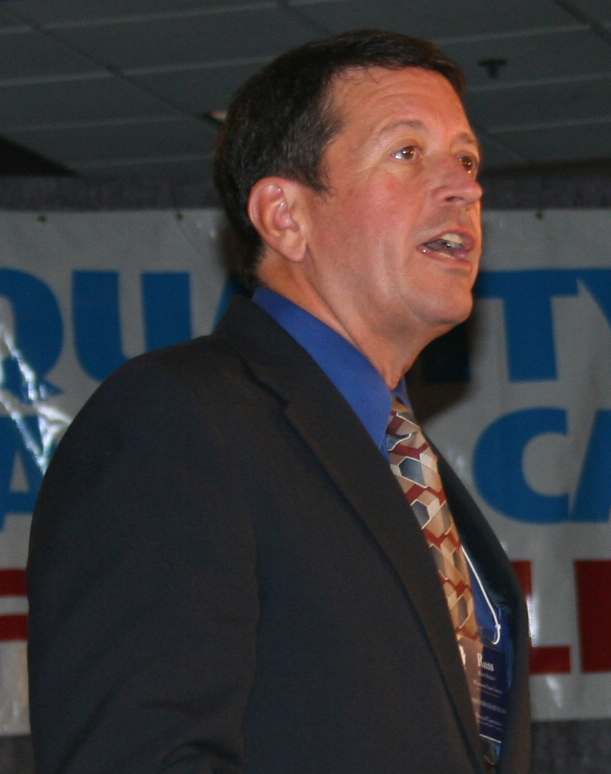

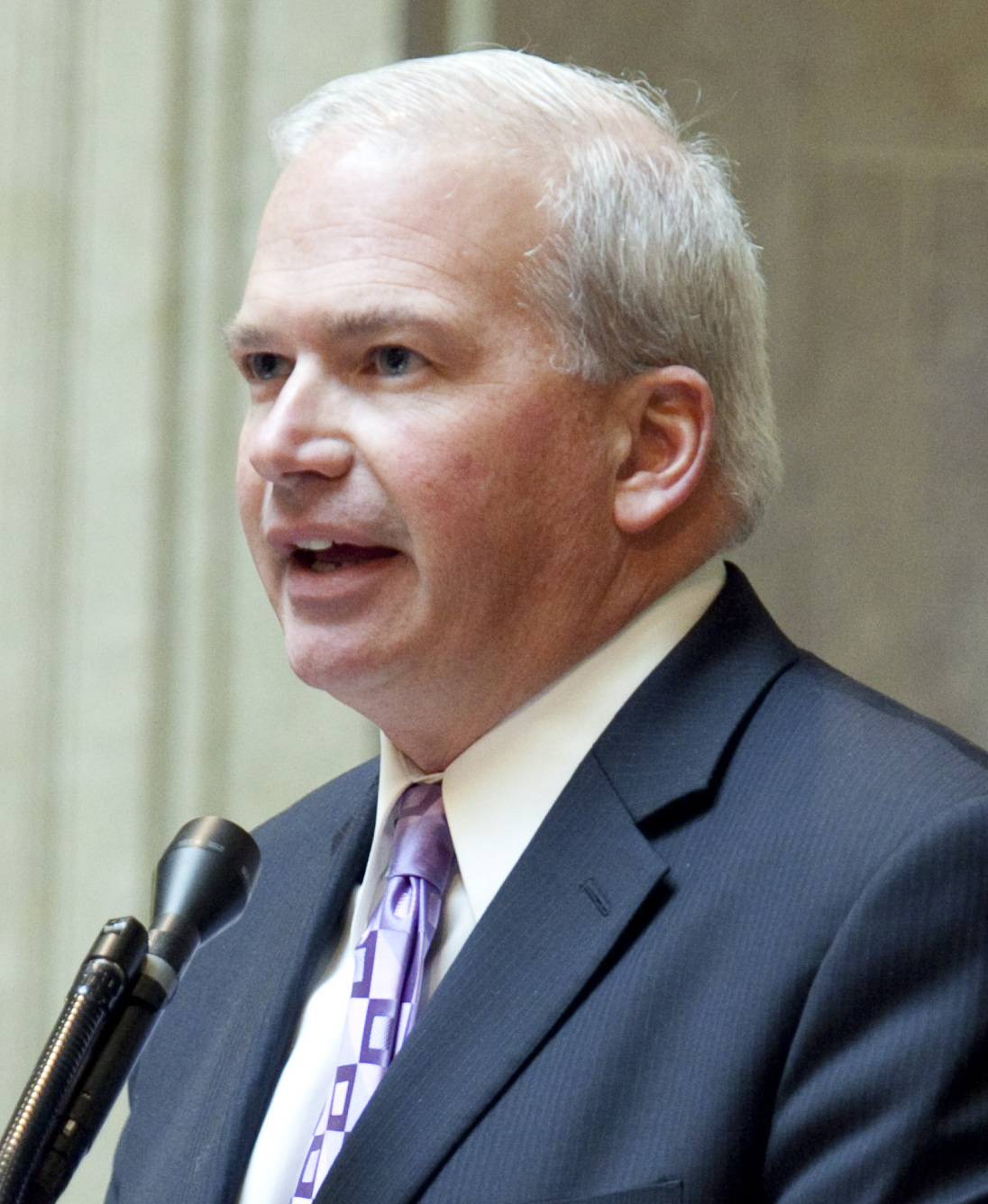
	Majority party	Minority party
Leader	Russ Decker	Scott L. Fitzgerald
Party	Democratic	Republican
Leader since	October 24, 2007	January 1, 2007
Leader's seat	29th–Weston	13th–Juneau
Last election	10 seats, 49.68%	7 seats, 49.25%
Seats before	18	15
Seats won	8	8
Seats after	18	15
Seat change	Steady	Steady
Popular vote	666,668	575,543
Percentage	52.74%	45.53%
Swing	▲3.06 pp	▼3.72 pp
- Democratic hold Republican hold No election 50–60% 60–70% >90% 50–60% 80–90% >90% No election
President before election
Fred Risser
Democratic
Elected President
Fred Risser
Democratic

The 2008 Wisconsin Senate election was held on Tuesday, November 4, 2008. Sixteen of the 33 seats in the Wisconsin Senate were up for election—the even-numbered districts. Prior to the election 17 seats were held by Democrats, 14 were held by Republicans, and 2 seats were vacant.

The primary was held on September 9, 2008, and the filing deadline was July 8, 2008.

== Summary ==
Seats		Party (majority caucus shading)		Total
Seats		Democratic	Republican	Total
Last election (2006)		9	8	17
Total after last election (2006)		18	15	33
Total before this election		18	15	33
Up for election		8	8	16
of which:	Incumbent retiring	1	1	2
of which:	Vacated	1	1	2
of which:	Unopposed	4	2	6
This election		8	8	16
Change from last election		Steady	Steady	Steady
Total after this election		18	15	33
Change in total		Steady	Steady	

Popular vote
Democratic	52.74%
Republican	45.53%
Independent	1.73%

Senate seats won
Democratic	50%
Republican	50%

=== Close races ===
Seats where the margin of victory was under 10%:

- State Senate district 18, 0.19%
- State Senate district 8, 1.01%
- State Senate district 12, 2.48%
- State Senate district 32, 2.85%

== Outgoing incumbents ==
=== Vacated ===
- Roger Breske (D–Eland), first elected to the 12th district in a 1990 special election, resigned his seat on June 4, 2008, after being appointed Wisconsin Railroad Commissioner by governor Jim Doyle.
- Carol Roessler (R–Oshkosh), first elected to the 18th district in a 1987 special election, resigned her seat on July 4, 2008, after being appointed Administrator of State and Local Finance by governor Jim Doyle.

== Predictions ==
Source	Ranking	As of
Stateline	Lean D	October 15, 2008

== Results summary ==
Dist.	Incumbent				This race (Note: Not all totals add up to 100% due to scattering)
Dist.	Member	Party	First elected	Status	Candidates
02	Robert Cowles	Rep.	1987 (special)	Incumbent re-elected	▌ ✓ Robert Cowles (Rep.) 99.35%
04	Lena Taylor	Dem.	2004	Incumbent re-elected	▌ ✓ Lena Taylor (Dem.) 98.82%
06	Spencer Coggs	Dem.	2003 (recall)	Incumbent Ran	▌ ✓ Spencer Coggs (Dem.) 98.85%
08	Alberta Darling	Rep.	1992	Incumbent re-elected	▌ ✓ Alberta Darling (Rep.) 50.46%; ▌Sheldon Wasserman (Dem.) 49.45%
10	Sheila Harsdorf	Rep.	2000	Incumbent re-elected	▌ ✓ Sheila Harsdorf (Rep.) 56.40%; ▌Alison H. Page (Dem.) 43.49%
12	--Vacant (Note: Roger Breske (D) resigned June 4, 2008)--			Previous incumbent resigned Jun. 4, 2008; New member elected. Democratic hold	▌ ✓ Jim Holperin (Dem.) 51.21%; ▌Tom Tiffany (Rep.) 48.73%
14	Luther Olsen	Rep.	2004	Incumbent re-elected	▌ ✓ Luther Olsen (Rep.) 99.36%
16	Mark Miller	Dem.	2004	Incumbent re-elected	▌Mark Miller (Dem.) 99.29%
18	--Vacant (Note: Carol Roessler (R) resigned July 4, 2008)--			Previous incumbent resigned Jul. 4, 2008; New member elected. Republican hold	▌ ✓ Randy Hopper (Rep.) 50.05%; ▌Jessica King (Dem.) 49.86%
20	Glenn Grothman	Rep.	2004	Incumbent re-elected	▌ ✓ Glenn Grothman (Rep.) 80.26%; ▌Clyde Winter (Ind.) 19.64%
22	Robert Wirch	Dem.	1996	Incumbent re-elected	▌ ✓ Robert Wirch (Dem.) 66.65%; ▌Benjamin Lee Bakke (Rep.) 33.21%
24	Julie Lassa	Dem.	2003 (special)	Incumbent re-elected	▌ ✓ Julie Lassa (Dem.) 67.67%; ▌Tom Kimmet (Rep.) 32.28%
26	Fred Risser	Dem.	1962 (special)	Incumbent re-elected	▌ ✓ Fred Risser (Rep.) 99.13%
28	Mary Lazich	Rep.	1998 (special)	Incumbent re-elected	▌ ✓ Mary Lazich (Rep.) 99.24%
30	Dave Hansen	Dem.	2000	Incumbent re-elected	▌ ✓ Dave Hansen (Dem.) 66.06%; ▌Chad Fradette (Rep.) 33.88%
32	Dan Kapanke	Rep.	2004	Incumbent re-elected	▌ ✓ Dan Kapanke (Rep.) 51.38%; ▌Tara Johnson (Dem.) 48.53%
