= William Murat =

American politician (born 1957)

Member of the Wisconsin State Assembly from the 71st district
- In office January 2, 1995 – January 4, 1999
- Preceded by: Stan Gruszynski
- Succeeded by: Julie Lassa

District Attorney of Portage County, Wisconsin
- In office June 1988 – January 7, 1991
- Preceded by: John Runde
- Succeeded by: Susan Lynch

Personal details
- Born: December 4, 1957 (age 68) Stevens Point, Wisconsin, U.S.
- Party: Democratic
- Education: University of Wisconsin–Stevens Point (B.S.); University of Wisconsin Law School (J.D.); Columbia Business School (M.B.A.)
- Profession: Lawyer, politician, lobbyist

William M. "Bill" Murat (born December 4, 1957) is an American lobbyist, attorney, and Democratic politician from Stevens Point, Wisconsin. He served nearly 20 years as chief of staff to U.S. Senator Tammy Baldwin (beginning while she was a U.S. representative; 2001–2020). Before joining Baldwin's staff, he served two terms in the Wisconsin State Assembly, representing the Stevens Point area from 1995 to 1999, and served as district attorney of Portage County, Wisconsin.

== Early life and career ==
Bill Murat was born and raised in Stevens Point, Wisconsin. He graduated from Stevens Point Area Senior High School in 1976 and went on to attend the University of Wisconsin–Stevens Point, earning his bachelor's degree in 1980. He immediately continued his education at the University of Wisconsin Law School, earned his J.D., and was admitted to the Wisconsin bar.

After completing law school, Murat returned to Stevens Point and was hired as an assistant district attorney in 1984. While serving as district attorney, Murat was active in politics with the Democratic Party of Wisconsin, served as campaign chairman for state representative Stan Gruszynski, and was elected chairman of the Democratic Party of Portage County, Wisconsin.

Murat climbed the ranks in the district attorney's office, and was appointed acting district attorney in June 1988 after the resignation of the incumbent, John Runde. He decided to run for a full term as district attorney that fall, and won the race without opposition. He declined to run for re-election in 1990, and instead resumed his education, attending Columbia Business School and earning an M.B.A. in 1992.

== Political career ==
Murat was first elected to the Assembly in 1994 as a Democrat and was a member until 1999.

While serving in the Assembly, Murat developed a strong professional and personal relationship with his Assembly colleague Tammy Baldwin. Baldwin was elected to the U.S. House of Representatives in 1998, and hired Murat as her district director. After two years in that role, Murat moved to Washington, D.C., to serve as Baldwin's chief of staff. Murat would remain as Baldwin's top government aide for the next twenty years, moving with her to the U.S. Senate after her 2012 election. Murat retired from government service in 2020, earning a heartfelt tribute from his longtime boss on the Senate floor. He now works as a senior advisor to the D.C. lobbying firm Pyxis Partners.

== Personal life and family ==
Bill Murat is a son of James L. Murat. Bill is the fourth generation of his family to work as a lawyer in Portage County. His great-grandfather, John A. Murat served 30 years as county judge (1890–1920).
