= Rick Gudex =

American politician

Richard Gudex

President pro tempore of the Wisconsin Senate
- In office January 5, 2015 – October 12, 2016
- Preceded by: Joe Leibham
- Succeeded by: Howard Marklein

Member of the Wisconsin Senate from the 18th district
- In office January 3, 2013 – October 12, 2016
- Preceded by: Jessica King
- Succeeded by: Dan Feyen

Mayor of Mayville, Wisconsin
- In office 1998–2000

Personal details
- Born: July 23, 1968 Eden, Wisconsin, U.S.
- Died: October 12, 2016 (aged 48) Eden, Wisconsin, U.S.
- Party: Republican
- Spouse: Kimberly Gudex
- Children: 2
- Occupation: Legislator, production manager

Richard Gudex (July 23, 1968 – October 12, 2016) was an American manufacturing production manager and Republican politician from Fond du Lac, Wisconsin. He was the former Fond du Lac City Council president, and on November 6, 2012, he defeated incumbent Democrat Jessica King from her seat in the Wisconsin State Senate's 18th District by 590 votes.

== Background ==
According to his campaign biography, Gudex was born in Eden, Wisconsin, in 1968, graduated from St. Mary's Springs High School, and worked full-time for the family business before becoming a shop worker at the Gehl Company, soon becoming a supervisor. As of 2012, he was a production manager at Brenner Tank.

== Public office ==
In 1998, he was living in Mayville, Wisconsin, and was elected the city's Mayor. When he moved back to Eden, he was elected to the Village Board. Gudex and his wife Kim moved to Fond du Lac in 2005; in 2009, he won a seat on the Fond du Lac City Council and was re-elected in 2011. In 2012, he began his third term as President of the Council.

== Personal life and death ==
Gudex was married to Kim; the couple had two children. He was an active member of his Catholic parish and belonged to the Knights of Columbus.

Gudex died on October 12, 2016, aged 48 of a self-inflicted gunshot wound. At the time of his death he had been serving as President pro tempore of the Wisconsin Senate.

State Senator Scott Fitzgerald was quoted as saying "I was deeply saddened to hear this morning of the passing of Senator Rick Gudex. Rick will be deeply missed by his Senate colleagues; our thoughts and prayers are with his family at this difficult time."

== Electoral history ==
=== Wisconsin Senate (2012) ===
Wisconsin Senate, 18th District Election, 2012
Party	Candidate	Votes	%	±%
General Election, November 6, 2012
Republican	Rick Gudex	43,079	50.29%	+1.46pp
Democratic	Jessica King (incumbent)	42,479	49.60%	−1.50pp
	Scattering	80	0.08%	
Plurality		600	0.70%	-1.57pp
Total votes		85,648	100.0%	+155.24%
Republican gain from Democratic				
