= Vinnie Miresse =

21st-century American politician

Member of the Wisconsin State Assembly from the 71st district
- Incumbent
- Assumed office January 6, 2025
- Preceded by: Katrina Shankland

Member of the Board of Supervisors of Portage County, Wisconsin, from the 1st district
- Incumbent
- Assumed office January 17, 2017
- Preceded by: Tom Mallison

Personal details
- Born: Vincent Jordan Miresse; November 26, 1977 (age 48) Fond du Lac, Wisconsin, U.S.
- Party: Democratic
- Spouse: Gina Victoria Sinisi
- Children: 2
- Education: University of Wisconsin–Stevens Point
- Occupation: Small business owner
- Website: Campaign website

Vincent Jordan "Vinnie" Miresse (born November 26, 1977) is an American sustainable building contractor and Democratic politician from Stevens Point, Wisconsin. He is a member of the Wisconsin State Assembly, representing Wisconsin's 71st Assembly district since 2025. He also serves as a member of the board of supervisors of Portage County, Wisconsin, since 2017.

== Biography ==
Vinnie Miresse was born in Fond du Lac, Wisconsin, in November 1977. He was raised and educated there, graduating from Fond du Lac's Goodrich High School in 1996. He went on to attend college at the University of Wisconsin–Stevens Point, where he earned his bachelor's degree in social sciences in 2001.

After graduating from college, Miresse remained in Stevens Point, Wisconsin, and began his career there. He initially worked for the Central Wisconsin Environmental Station, a camp site run by the university, where he worked as site manager and taught environmental education. Miresse is also a musician and partially funded his education through paid musical performances. In the early 2000s, he moved to Boise, Idaho, where musical performance and musical instruction was his primary source of income. During the 2008 Great Recession, Miresse returned to the Stevens Point area, working for Central Waters Brewing Company and Northwind Renewable Energy, before starting his own residential remodeling business, Wholistic Home Solutions LLC, in 2011. Since 2011, Wholistic Home Solutions has been his primary occupation, the business focuses on building or adapting homes with sustainable, energy efficient, and environmentally friendly design.

== Political career ==
Miresse first entered public office in January 2017, when the Portage County Board of Supervisors voted to appoint him to replace 1st district supervisor Tom Mallison, who had resigned to become county treasurer. He was elected to a full two-year term in 2018 and re-elected in 2020 and 2022, without facing any opposition. In 2024, he faced his first contested race against contractor Stephen Klein, but prevailed by a wide margin in the April general election. While serving on the county board, Miresse continued his education and graduated from the University of Wisconsin–Extension local government academy program.

While running for re-election in 2024, Miresse announced that he would run for a seat in the Wisconsin State Assembly that fall. Miresse sought to succeed Stevens Point's six-term incumbent state representative Katrina Shankland in the 71st Assembly district; Shankland had previously announced she would forgo re-election to seek the Democratic nomination for Congress in the 3rd congressional district. Miresse faced no opposition in the Democratic primary and went on to face Republican Bob Pahmeier, a former federal corrections officer and union leader. Miresse prevailed by 2,215 votes, taking 53% in the general election.

In August 2025, Miresse, alongside state senator Jodi Habush Sinykin proposed legislation to reauthorize the Knowles-Nelson Stewardship Program for another six years.

In October, Miresse authored a bill to grant "rights of nature" to Devil's Lake State Park as well as a bill to reinstate a law regulating mining.

== Personal life and family ==
Vinnie Miresse is the only son of Bruce A. and Anna Lynn (née Gallegos) Miresse. His parents divorced when he was five years old. Both parents subsequently remarried; Vinnie has a half-sister through his mother's second marriage.

Vinnie married Gina Sinisi, who works in fundraising for the University of Wisconsin–Stevens Point. They reside in Stevens Point and have two school-age children.

== Electoral history ==
=== Wisconsin Assembly (2024) ===
Wisconsin Assembly, 71st District Election, 2024
Party	Candidate	Votes	%	±%
General Election, November 5, 2024
Democratic	Vinnie Miresse	18,631	53.13%	−3.92pp
Republican	Bob Pahmeier	16,416	46.82%	+3.93pp
	Scattering	18	0.05%	
Plurality		2,215	6.32%	-7.84pp
Total votes		35,065	100.0%	+25.58%
Democratic hold				

Wisconsin State Assembly
Preceded by Katrina Shankland	Member of the Wisconsin State Assembly from the 71st district January 6, 2025 – present	Incumbent
