= Jessica King =

American lawyer and politician

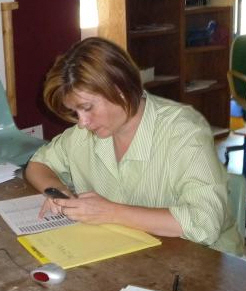

Member of the Wisconsin Senate from the 18th district
- In office August 25, 2011 – January 3, 2013
- Preceded by: Randy Hopper
- Succeeded by: Rick Gudex

Personal details
- Born: July 21, 1975 (age 51) Fond du Lac County, Wisconsin, U.S.
- Party: Democratic
- Education: University of Wisconsin, Oshkosh (BA); Thomas Jefferson School of Law (JD)
- Website: Campaign website

Jessica Jeane King (born July 21, 1975) is an American lawyer and politician from Wisconsin. She is a former Democratic member of the Wisconsin Senate, representing the 18th district when elected in 2011. She defeated incumbent Republican Senator Randy Hopper in a special recall election on August 9, 2011, and took office August 25, 2011; but lost the seat the following year to another Republican, Rick Gudex, in the November 2012 general election, which reverted that chamber back to Republican control.

== Background ==
King was born and raised in Fond du Lac County, Wisconsin. Her parents were disabled, and she became a ward of the state at age 15.

She put herself through the University of Wisconsin, Oshkosh, working in a juicebox factory and doing similar work, and went on to earn a J.D. degree from Thomas Jefferson School of Law in California.

In 2004, she returned to Wisconsin to care for her aging parents. She opened a small business, and served as an adjunct professor at University of Wisconsin-Oshkosh.

She is a former associate attorney who was with Steinhilber, Swanson, Mares, Marone & McDermott.

King was elected to the Oshkosh Common Council, eventually becoming deputy mayor, In 2008, she ran against Hopper for the Senate losing by only 163 votes (41,741 to 41,904).

== Wisconsin Senate ==
In the wake of the 2011 Wisconsin protests, King was one of two Wisconsin Democratic challengers successful in unseating Republican incumbent senators who had supported Governor Walker. The 18th district includes Fond du Lac, Oshkosh, and Waupun. She narrowly defeated Hopper by 1254 votes (28,191 votes to 26,937).

On November 13, 2012, King conceded to Republican Rick Gudex, then Fond du Lac City Council president. As a result of the race, the Wisconsin Senate reverted to Republican control by a two-vote majority in January 2013.

== 2020 congressional election ==
She ran against incumbent Glenn Grothman for Wisconsin's 6th congressional district in 2020. She received 164,239 votes, or 40.72% of the total votes cast, losing the election.

== Electoral history ==
=== Wisconsin Senate (2008–2012) ===
| Year | Election | Date | Elected | | | | Defeated | | | | Total | Plurality |
|---|---|---|---|---|---|---|---|---|---|---|---|---|
| 2008 | General | Nov. 4 | Randy Hopper | Republican | 41,904 | 50.05% | Jessica King | Dem. | 41,741 | 49.86% | 83,724 | 163 |
| 2011 | Primary | Jul. 12 | Jessica King | Democratic | 19,562 | 68.21% | John D. Buckstaff | Dem. | 8,995 | 31.37% | 28,677 | 10,567 |
| 2011 | Recall | Aug. 9 | Jessica King | Democratic | 28,191 | 51.10% | Randy Hopper (inc) | Rep. | 26,937 | 48.83% | 55,170 | 1,254 |
| 2012 | General | Nov. 6 | Rick Gudex | Republican | 43,079 | 50.29% | Jessica King (inc) | Dem. | 42,479 | 49.60% | 85,648 | 600 |

=== U.S. House (2020) ===
| Year | Election | Date | Elected | | | | Defeated | | | | Total | Plurality |
|---|---|---|---|---|---|---|---|---|---|---|---|---|
| 2020 | Primary | Aug. 11 | Jessica J. King | Democratic | 38,043 | 75.89% | Michael G. Beardsley | Dem. | 7,896 | 15.75% | 50,128 | 30,147 |
| 2020 | Primary | Aug. 11 | Jessica J. King | Democratic | 38,043 | 75.89% | Matthew L. Boor | Dem. | 4,165 | 8.31% | 50,128 | 30,147 |
| 2020 | General | Nov. 3 | Glenn Grothman (inc) | Republican | 238,874 | 59.23% | Jessica J. King | Dem. | 164,239 | 40.72% | 403,333 | 74,635 |

Wisconsin Senate
| Preceded by Randy Hopper | Member of the Wisconsin Senate from the 18th district 2011–2013 | Succeeded by Rick Gudex |
