= Stan Gruszynski =

American politician (born 1949)

Member of the Wisconsin State Assembly from the 71st district
- In office January 7, 1985 – January 3, 1995
- Preceded by: Donald K. Stitt
- Succeeded by: William Murat

Member of the Board of Supervisors of Marinette County, Wisconsin
- Incumbent
- Assumed office April 2020

Personal details
- Born: February 6, 1949 (age 77) Marinette, Wisconsin, U.S.
- Party: Democratic
- Occupation: Farmer, politician

Stan Gruszynski (born February 6, 1949) is an American farmer and Democratic politician from Marinette County, Wisconsin. He is a member of the Marinette County board of supervisors since 2020. During the presidency of Barack Obama, he was Wisconsin state director for USDA Rural Development. Earlier in his career, he served five terms in the Wisconsin State Assembly, representing the 71st Assembly district from 1985 to 1995. He was also one of Wisconsin's representatives on the Democratic National Committee in 2008, and thus served as a superdelegate to the 2008 Democratic National Convention.

== Early life ==
Gruszynski was born in Marinette, Wisconsin. He graduated from Northland College, with a bachelor's degree in sociology and political science, and pursued graduate studies at the University of Wisconsin–Stevens Point.

== Assembly career ==
As a member of the State Assembly, Gruszynski authored the Wisconsin Environmental Education Law, Farms for the Future Act, and served as chairman of the Assembly's Colleges and Universities Committee.

== Later elections ==
In 1994, Gruszynski decided against seeking reelection, and instead ran unsuccessfully for United States House of Representatives from Wisconsin's 8th congressional district losing to the incumbent, Toby Roth. Gruszynski again ran for the House of Representatives in 1996, but failed to receive the nomination of the Democratic Party, losing to Jay W. Johnson, who would go on to win the seat.

== Later career ==
Gruszynski formerly served as the director of the Global Environmental Management (GEM) Rural Leadership and Community Development Program at the University of Wisconsin–Stevens Point.

In 2008, he attempted to return to the Wisconsin State Assembly, challenging incumbent Republican Jeffrey Mursau in the 36th Assembly district. He lost the general election, but received a respectable 48% of the vote in the generally safe Republican district.

In 2009 he was appointed by the Obama administration to be the Wisconsin State Director of U.S.D.A. Rural Development.

He was elected to the Marinette County board of supervisors in 2020.

He lives in the town of Porterfield, Wisconsin.
