= Glenn Grothman =

American politician and lawyer (born 1955)

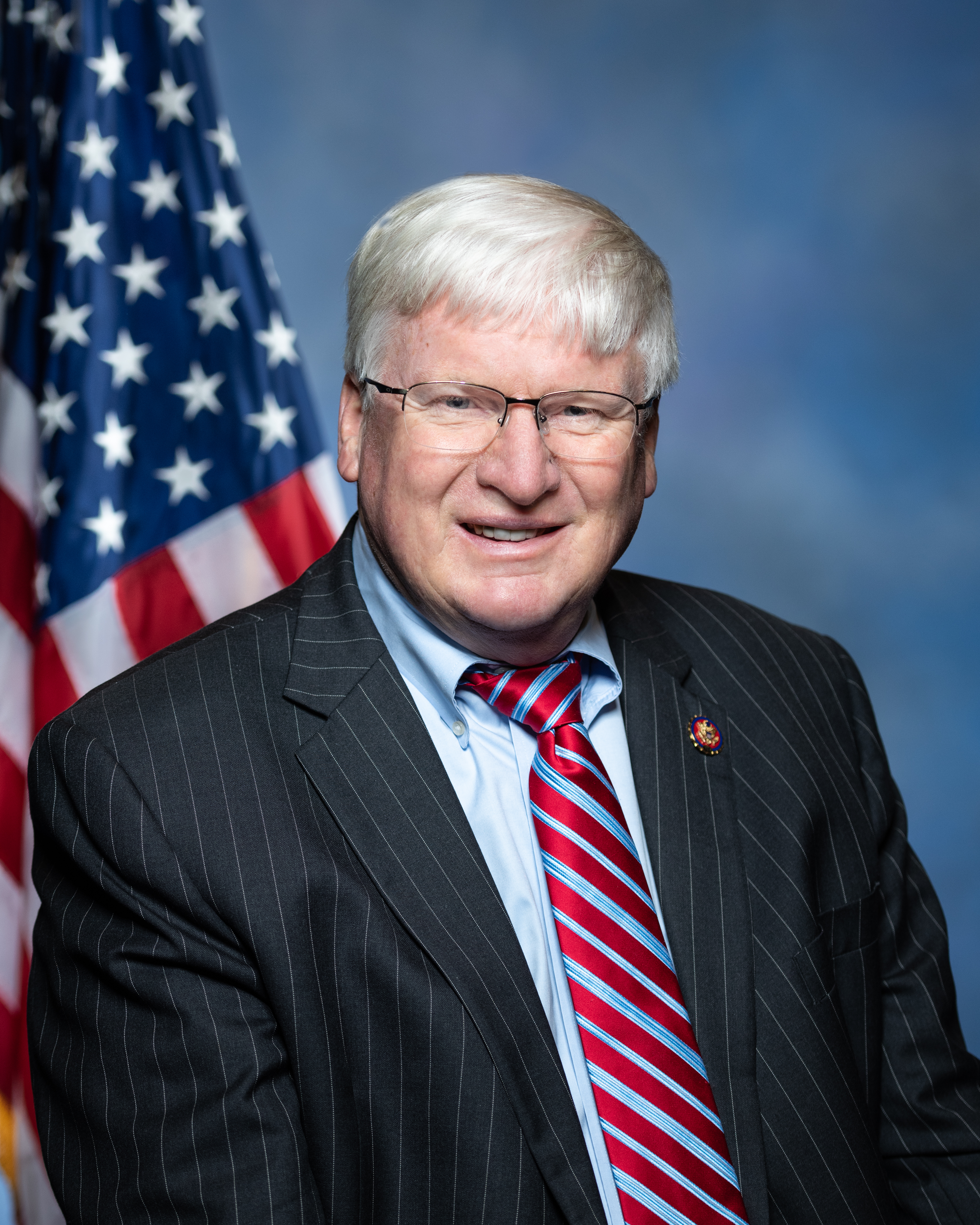
- Official portrait, 2020

Member of the U.S. House of Representatives from Wisconsin's 6th district
- Incumbent
- Assumed office January 3, 2015
- Preceded by: Tom Petri

Member of the Wisconsin Senate from the 20th district
- In office January 3, 2005 – January 3, 2015
- Preceded by: Mary Panzer
- Succeeded by: Duey Stroebel

Member of the Wisconsin State Assembly
- In office January 5, 2003 – January 3, 2005
- Preceded by: Michael A. Lehman
- Succeeded by: Patricia Strachota
- Constituency: 58th district
- In office December 16, 1993 – January 5, 2003
- Preceded by: Mary Panzer
- Succeeded by: Daniel LeMahieu
- Constituency: 59th district

Personal details
- Born: Glenn Sholes Grothman; July 3, 1955 (age 71)
- Party: Republican
- Education: University of Wisconsin, Madison (BBA, JD)
- Website: House website Campaign website

Glenn Sholes Grothman (/ˈɡroʊθmən/ GROHTH-mən; born July 3, 1955) is an American attorney and politician serving as the U.S. representative from Wisconsin's 6th congressional district. A member of the Republican Party, he was first elected to his seat in 2014.

Grothman represented the 58th district in the Wisconsin State Assembly from 1993 until 2005 and was vice chair of the Assembly's Republican caucus from 1999 to 2004. He represented the 20th district in the Wisconsin Senate from 2005 to 2015, and was the assistant majority leader from 2011 to 2015.

== Early life and education ==
Grothman graduated from Homestead High School in Mequon in 1973. In 1978, he graduated from the University of Wisconsin–Madison with a BBA degree. He received a Juris Doctor from the University of Wisconsin Law School in 1983, was admitted to the bar, and became an attorney with a firm in West Bend, Wisconsin.

== Wisconsin legislature ==
=== Elections ===
Grothman was elected to the Wisconsin 58th Assembly District in a special election in December 1993 to succeed Mary Panzer, who had won a special election for the state senate. He was reelected five times, from 1994 to 2002. From 1999 to 2004, he was vice chairman of the Republican caucus.

In 2004, Grothman ran for the state senate seat in the 20th district, challenging Panzer, who had by then risen to state senate majority leader, in the Republican primary. The district included the city of West Bend, other parts of Washington County, and parts of Fond du Lac, Dodge, Sheboygan, and Ozaukee Counties.

Running well to Panzer's right, Grothman won the nomination with 79% of the vote to Panzer's 21%. He was unopposed in the general election in the heavily Republican district, and reelected in 2008 and 2012.

=== Tenure ===
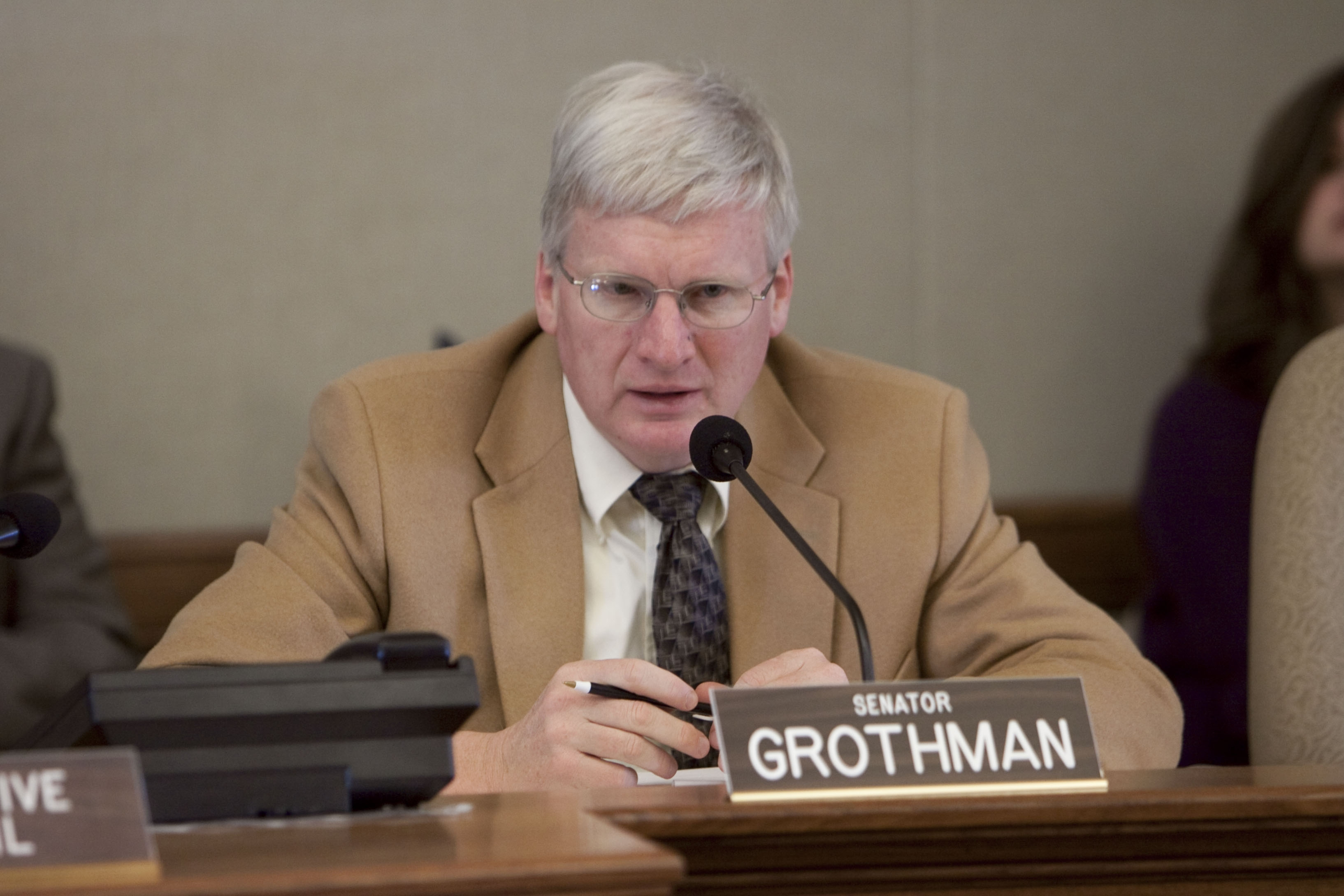
Grothman in 2009

From 2007 to 2008, Grothman was the Senate Minority Caucus Chair. He became the assistant Republican leader in 2009, serving as assistant minority leader from 2009 to 2010 and as assistant majority leader from 2011 to 2015.

Grothman was a member of the American Legislative Exchange Council (ALEC).

=== 2011 Wisconsin budget protests ===
Grothman was a vocal proponent of SB11, a controversial bill proposed by Governor Scott Walker in early 2011. He said he supported the budget repair bill because it was fiscally responsible. In a press interview, he said he did not "find it impressive" that over 70,000 protesters had marched on the Capitol.

During the protests, Grothman was cornered by almost 200 pro-union protesters yelling "Shame! Shame!" outside the Capitol. He said he was not concerned about violence at the time, adding, "They're loud, they'll give you the finger, and they yell at you, but I really think deep down inside they're just mostly college kids having fun, just like they're having fun sleeping with their girlfriends on air mattresses. That's the guts of that crowd." He also called the protesters "a different breed of person" and "a bunch of slobs taking up the building."

During this time, Grothman advocated that the Wisconsin Department of Natural Resources hire more business-friendly people. In doing so, he went out of his way to single out one University of Wisconsin campus as a target: "Maybe you look to hire those people who know what the real world is like, rather than a recent graduate from UW-Stevens Point who doesn't know what the real world is like." This was only days before he appeared at UW–Stevens Point with the Joint Finance Committee for a day of hearings on Walker's budget bill.

Grothman was subject to a recall effort in the spring of 2011, but the effort failed, collecting only 75% of the required signatures.

== U.S. House of Representatives ==
=== Elections ===
==== 2014 ====
On April 3, 2014, Grothman announced he would run in that year's Republican primary for Wisconsin's 6th congressional district against 17-term incumbent Tom Petri. He positioned himself well to Petri's right; in his campaign announcement he called Petri a "decent, genial person" who lacked the "sense of urgency" to put more curbs on "a federal government that seems to be out of control." Grothman did not have to give up his state senate seat to run for Congress; state senators serve staggered four-year terms, and he was not up for reelection until 2016. Shortly after Grothman entered the race, Petri dropped out.

Grothman's longtime home in West Bend was in the 5th District, represented by Jim Sensenbrenner, but his state senate district included much of the southeastern part of the 6th congressional district. In the summer of 2014, Grothman moved to Campellsport, a suburb of Fond du Lac, which is in the 6th District.

In the general election, Grothman defeated the Democratic nominee, Winnebago County Executive Mark Harris, with 57% of the vote to Harris's 41%.

==== 2016 ====
Grothman was reelected over Democratic nominee Sarah Lloyd, getting 57% of the vote to Lloyd's 37%.

==== 2018 ====
Grothman was reelected over Democratic nominee Dan Kohl, getting 55.5% of the vote to Kohl's 44.5%.

==== 2020 ====
Grothman was reelected over Democratic nominee Jessica King, getting 59.23% of the vote to King's 40.72%.

==== 2022 ====
Grothman had only token opposition from Douglas Mullenix in the Republican primary, and ran unopposed in the general election.

=== Committee assignments ===
- Committee on the Budget
- Committee on Education and the Workforce
  - Subcommittee on Early Childhood, Elementary and Secondary Education
  - Subcommittee on Health, Employment, Labor, and Pensions
- Committee on Oversight and Government Reform
  - Subcommittee on Government Operations
  - Subcommittee on Transportation and Public Assets
- Joint Economic Committee

=== Caucus memberships ===
- Republican Study Committee
- Second Amendment Caucus
- Congressional Coalition on Adoption
- Congressional Taiwan Caucus
- Congressional Motorcycle Caucus
- Rare Disease Caucus

== Political positions ==
The Washington Post has described Grothman as "a shambling, strident conservative with a Trumpian tell-it-like-it-is streak who typically votes with the House GOP leadership".

=== Donald Trump ===
According to Axios in October 2020, Grothman had a "Trump Loyalty Index" – measuring both his congressional votes and public reaction to certain statements from President Donald Trump – of 93, higher than any other member of Congress.

Grothman praised the first month of work by the second Donald Trump presidency, "This is moving very quickly compared to other administrations, and I think, across the board, he’s done some very good things."

=== Socio-economic issues ===
Grothman said Governor Scott Walker should defund Wisconsin's kindergarten program for 4-year-olds, saying that any academic benefits disappear by fourth grade. Politifact rated this "False", writing, "Some studies reached that conclusion. But Grothman is citing one small portion of a much broader debate and declaring the whole matter settled when there is considerable evidence on the other side."

Speaking in support of Walker's decision to repeal the Wisconsin Equal Pay Act, Grothman said that the alleged pay differential is explainable: "Once you break it down by married and unmarried, the differential disappears." A study by the American Association of University Women in 2007 found that life choices and family circumstances explain only part of the difference in pay between genders. Grothman rejected that study and added, "You could argue that money is more important for men. I think a guy in their first job, maybe because they expect to be a breadwinner someday, may be a little more money-conscious. To attribute everything to a so-called bias in the workplace is just not true."

In June 2013, Grothman proposed changing Wisconsin's welfare system to require that nondisabled single adults either work 20 hours per week or attend 20 hours of job training per week to continue receiving FoodShare benefits.

=== Concealed carry ===
Grothman is a longtime supporter of concealed carry legislation, but does not advocate allowing concealed weapons in taverns. He believes concealed carry laws will deter criminal behavior, with permits being given to law-abiding citizens who pass a gun safety course.

Grothman co-introduced 2011 SB 93, which Walker signed into law. This bill made Wisconsin the 49th state to legalize concealed carry.

=== LGBT rights ===
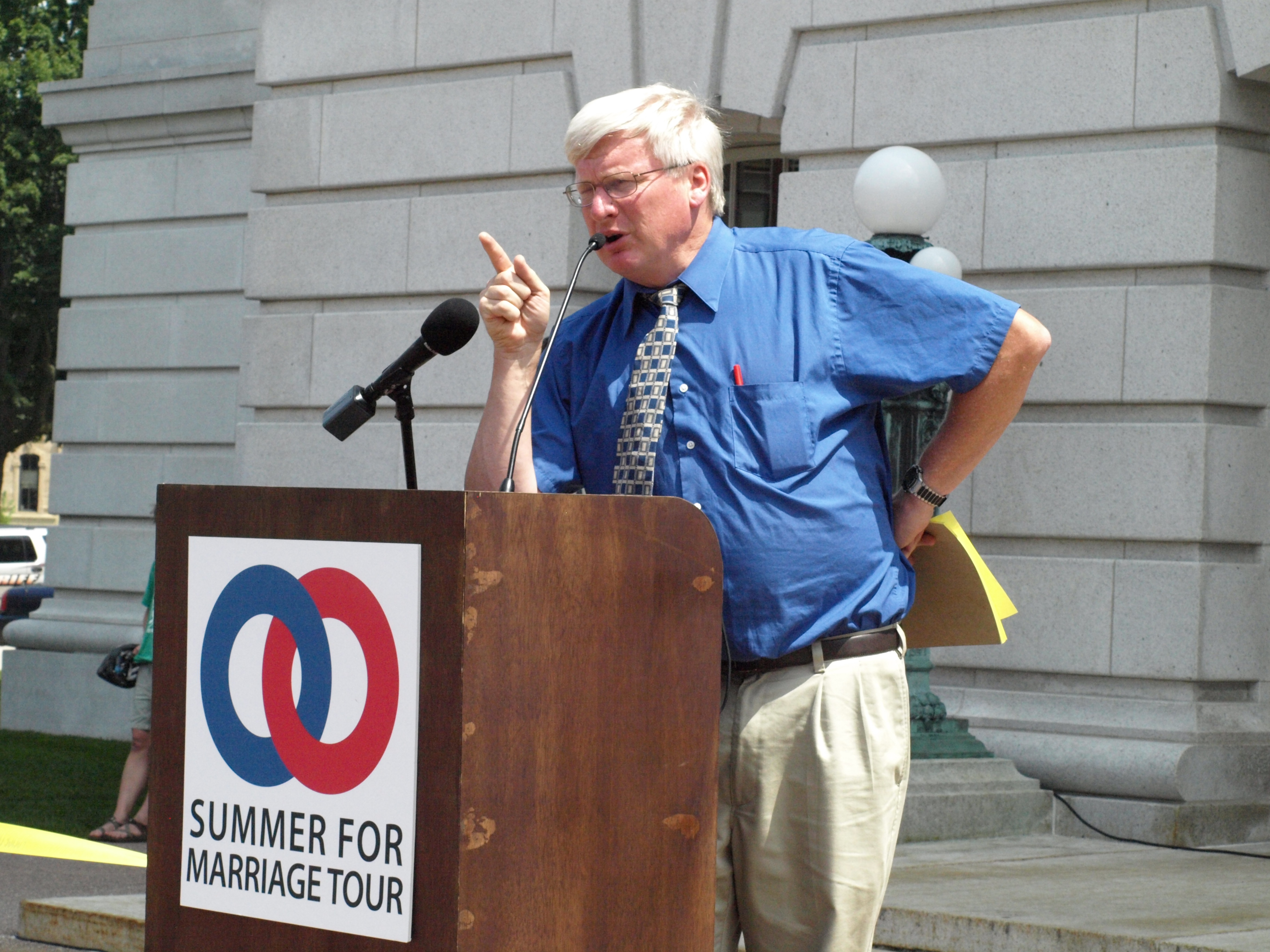
Grothman speaking in opposition to same-sex marriage in 2009 at the Wisconsin State Capitol

Grothman opposed a provision in a 2010 sex education law that prohibited teachers from promoting bias based on sexual orientation, saying he did not believe the topic should be discussed at all in public schools. According to the Capitol Times, Grothman's opposition was based on the belief that instructors who lead these talks would have what he called an "agenda" to persuade students to become gay. He postulated that "Part of that agenda which is left unsaid is that some of those who throw it out as an option would like it if more kids became homosexuals."

In April 2014, Grothman said that he was concerned about what God might think of the United States after Secretary of State John Kerry announced plans to send scientists to Uganda in response to a new law against homosexuality; Grothman described Kerry's plans as a way "to say how wonderful the homosexual lifestyle is" and said Republicans, conservatives, and church leaders were not confronting the issue of homosexuality and were "losing the issue": "We had such a great country in the relatively recent past. Now America, supposed to be the light of the world, instead we're the light going in the opposite direction."

In 2015, Grothman cosponsored a resolution to amend the US constitution to ban same-sex marriage. Grothman also cosponsored a resolution disagreeing with the Supreme Court ruling in Obergefell v. Hodges, which held that same-sex marriage bans violated the constitution.

=== Racial politics ===
In a December 2012 press release, Grothman said that Kwanzaa is not a real holiday: "Of course, almost no black people today care about Kwanzaa—just white left-wingers who try to shove this down black people's throats in an effort to divide Americans."

Grothman has argued that Martin Luther King Jr. Day should not be a state employee holiday, calling it "an insult to all the other taxpayers around the state." He has expressed doubts that "state workers would be 'checking out DVDs or reading books' about King", saying they "would probably just be out shopping or watching television instead."

During a debate on the American Rescue Plan Act of 2021, Grothman made reference on the House floor to the Black Lives Matter website for once stating "We disrupt the Western-prescribed nuclear family structure ". He also claimed that President Joe Biden′s inauguration speech was divisive.

=== Health ===
Grothman has voted to repeal the Affordable Care Act.

Grothman co-sponsored Senate Bill 19 (2011), which removes the requirement of mandatory chlorination of groundwater in municipal water systems. The bill was supported by the League of Wisconsin Municipalities.

Grothman is a vocal supporter of decriminalizing raw milk sales.

"Everybody knows you're not supposed to smoke!", he wrote. Grothman also voted against the ban on smoking in bars, restaurants and other small business that became effective in July 2010. After the bill passed, he introduced new legislation to allow lodging establishments, such as hotels, to designate certain rooms as smoking rooms; the bill failed. He also co-sponsored a bill to exempt electronic cigarettes from the smoking ban.

=== Marriage ===
In February 2012, Grothman introduced Senate Bill 507, which would amend Wisconsin statutes to emphasize non-marital parenthood as a contributing factor to child abuse and neglect. Politifact investigated his claim that kids living with a parent and parent's partner are "20 times" more likely to be sexually abused, and rated it True.

He also sponsored State Bill 202, which would have repealed the Equal Pay Enforcement Act, saying that the "Left and the social welfare establishment want children born out of wedlock because they are far more likely to be dependent on the government."

=== Foreign policy ===
Grothman voted to support Israel following the October 7 attacks.

In 2024, Grothman voted against the $60 billion military aid package for Ukraine; The Washington Post reported that some of the funding would have supported defense jobs in his constituency.

== Public image ==
In October 2016, Grothman was featured in the "People Who Somehow Got Elected" segment on HBO's program Last Week Tonight with John Oliver. The segment made reference to Grothman's controversial comments about women and race during his time as an elected official.

== Personal life ==
Grothman is a resident of unincorporated Greenbush, west of Plymouth in Sheboygan County, and practices the Lutheran faith.

== Electoral history ==
=== Wisconsin Assembly, 59th district (1992–2000) ===
Year	Election	Date	Elected				Defeated				Total	Plurality
1993	Primary	November 9	Glenn Grothman	Republican	3,121	52.41%	Betty Pearson	Rep.	1,408	23.64%	5,955	1,713
1993	Primary	November 9	Glenn Grothman	Republican	3,121	52.41%	John Torinus	Rep.	720	12.09%	5,955	1,713
1993	Primary	November 9	Glenn Grothman	Republican	3,121	52.41%	William S. Reid	Rep.	389	6.53%	5,955	1,713
1993	Primary	November 9	Glenn Grothman	Republican	3,121	52.41%	Ruth A. Schmitt	Rep.	214	3.59%	5,955	1,713
1993	Primary	November 9	Glenn Grothman	Republican	3,121	52.41%	Mark A. Helmle	Rep.	103	1.73%	5,955	1,713
1993	Special	December 7	Glenn Grothman	Republican	3,410	78.70%	Richard M. Buntrock	Ind.	624	14.40%	4,333	2,786
1993	Special	December 7	Glenn Grothman	Republican	3,410	78.70%	Kevin Scheunemann	Lib.	103	1.73%	4,333	2,786
1994	General	November 8	Glenn Grothman (inc.)	Republican	13,222	100.0%					13,222	13,222
1996	General	November 5	Glenn Grothman (inc.)	Republican	18,216	100.0%					18,216	18,216
1998	General	November 3	Glenn Grothman (inc.)	Republican	15,074	100.0%					15,074	15,074
2000	General	November 7	Glenn Grothman (inc.)	Republican	22,729	98.98%					22,964	22,494

=== Wisconsin Assembly, 59th district (2002) ===
Year	Election	Date	Elected				Defeated	Total	Plurality
2002	General	November 5	Glenn Grothman	Republican	14,032	99.48%		14,105	13,959

=== Wisconsin Senate (2004–2012) ===
Year	Election	Date	Elected				Defeated				Total	Plurality
2004	Primary	September 14	Glenn Grothman	Republican	27,732	78.84%	Mary Panzer (inc.)	Rep.	7,430	21.12%	35,175	20,302
2004	General	November 2	Glenn Grothman	Republican	75,424	99.15%	--unopposed--				76,073	74,775
2008	General	November 4	Glenn Grothman (inc.)	Republican	69,942	80.26%	Clyde Winter	Ind.	17,113	19.64%	87,146	52,829
2012	General	November 6	Glenn Grothman (inc.)	Republican	66,882	68.63%	Tanya Lohr	Dem.	30,504	31.30%	97,460	36,378

=== U.S. House of Representatives (2014–2024) ===
Year	Election	Date	Elected				Defeated				Total	Plurality
2014	Primary	August 12	Glenn Grothman	Republican	23,247	36.16%	Joe Leibham	Rep.	23,028	35.82%	64,295	219
2014	Primary	August 12	Glenn Grothman	Republican	23,247	36.16%	Duey Stroebel	Rep.	15,873	24.69%	64,295	219
2014	Primary	August 12	Glenn Grothman	Republican	23,247	36.16%	Tom Denow	Rep.	2,117	3.29%	64,295	219
2014	General	November 4	Glenn Grothman	Republican	169,767	56.77%	Mark L. Harris	Dem.	122,212	40.87%	299,033	47,555
2014	General	November 4	Glenn Grothman	Republican	169,767	56.77%	Gus Fahrendorf	Ind.	6,865	2.30%	299,033	47,555
2016	General	November 8	Glenn Grothman (inc.)	Republican	204,147	57.15%	Sarah Lloyd	Dem.	133,072	37.26%	357,183	71,075
2016	General	November 8	Glenn Grothman (inc.)	Republican	204,147	57.15%	Jeff Dahlke	Ind.	19,716	5.52%	357,183	71,075
2018	General	November 6	Glenn Grothman (inc.)	Republican	180,311	55.47%	Dan Kohl	Dem.	144,536	44.46%	325,065	35,775
2020	General	November 3	Glenn Grothman (inc.)	Republican	238,874	59.23%	Jessica King	Dem.	164,239	40.72%	403,333	74,635
2022	General	November 8	Glenn Grothman (inc.)	Republican	239,231	94.94%	--unopposed--				251,999	
2024	General	November 5	Glenn Grothman (inc.)	Republican	251,889	61.23%	John Zarbano	Dem.	159,042	38.66%	411,349	92,847

U.S. House of Representatives
Preceded by Tom Petri	Member of the U.S. House of Representatives from Wisconsin's 6th congressional district 2015–present	Incumbent
U.S. order of precedence (ceremonial)
Preceded by Tom Emmer	United States representatives by seniority 135th	Succeeded by French Hill
