= Amy Binsfeld =

American politician (born 1976)

Member-elect of the Wisconsin Senate from the 9th district
- Assuming office January 4, 2027
- Succeeding: Devin LeMahieu

Member of the Wisconsin State Assembly from the 27th district
- In office January 3, 2023 – January 6, 2025
- Preceded by: Tyler Vorpagel
- Succeeded by: Lindee Brill

Personal details
- Born: Amy Radue; October 5, 1976 (age 50) Howards Grove, Wisconsin, U.S.
- Party: Republican
- Spouse: Nicholas Binsfeld (m. 2002)
- Children: 2
- Education: Lakeshore Technical College (AA)
- Website: Campaign website

Amy Binsfeld (née Radue; born October 5, 1976) is an American Republican politician from Sheboygan County, Wisconsin. She is a member-elect of the Wisconsin Senate, and will represent Wisconsin's 9th Senate district in the 108th Wisconsin Legislature (2027–2028). She previously served in the Wisconsin State Assembly, representing Wisconsin's 27th Assembly district during the 106th Wisconsin Legislature (2023–2025).

== Biography ==
Amy Binsfeld was born Amy Radue in Howards Grove, Wisconsin, and graduated from Manitowoc Lutheran High School in Manitowoc, Wisconsin. Shortly after graduating, she went to work in her family's 100-year-old business, Bitter Neumann Appliance Furniture Mattress, which has been her primary employer ever since. She returned to school later in life and earned a degree in paralegal studies in 2012.

== Political career ==
In April 2022, incumbent Wisconsin state representative Tyler Vorpagel announced that he would not run for re-election later that year. A week later, Binsfeld announced her candidacy for the Republican nomination in Vorpagel's heavily Republican 27th Assembly district. Surprisingly, no other candidates chose to stand for election in the 27th district, and Binsfeld was unopposed in the Republican primary. Another candidate did eventually join the general election race, when retired former five-term Democratic state representative Chester A. Gerlach chose to come out of retirement to try to win the seat as an independent.

Binsfeld ultimately prevailed in the 2022 general election with 64% of the vote. She took office in January 2023, at the start of the 106th Wisconsin Legislature.

In 2023 the Wisconsin Supreme Court struck down Wisconsin's legislative maps and new maps were enacted under pressure from the Court. Under the new maps, Binsfeld was drawn out of the 27th district and was drawn into the new 25th Assembly district. In the 25th district, she would have faced an incumbent-vs-incumbent primary election against Paul Tittl, whose home city of Manitowoc anchors the district. Instead, Binsfeld chose to establish residency in the new 26th Assembly district, where there is no incumbent. The 26th district comprises all of the city of Sheboygan, which had previously been divided between the 26th and 27th districts to dilute the political power of the Democratic votes of the city. Under the new maps, the 26th district is one of the most politically competitive districts in the state.

In the 2024 election, Binsfeld faced a challenge from Democrat Joe Sheehan, a former superintendent of Sheboygan schools and executive director of the Sheboygan County Economic Development Corporation. Binsfeld was defeated by a narrow 900 vote margin.

In March 2026, state senator Devin LeMahieu announced he would not run for re-election in 2026, leaving an open seat in the 9th state Senate district. Within 24 hours, Binsfield announced that she would run in the 2026 election to succeed him. The 9th Senate district comprises most of Sheboygan County, along with eastern Manitowoc County and parts of northeast Fond du Lac County. No Democratic candidate ran in this district, and local Democrats instead rallied behind independent candidate Christian Ellis. The race was not initially seen as competitive, but as polling and other data began to point to a large Democratic wave in the final month of the campaign, outside PACs began to spend significantly in this race. Ultimately, Binsfeld prevailed with 56% of the vote, and is set to return to the state Legislature in January 2027.

== Personal life and family ==
Amy Radue took the name Binsfeld when she married Nicholas "Lurch" Binsfeld in July 2002. They lived for several years in Plymouth, Wisconsin, before moving to their present home in the town of Mosel. They have two children. Nick works for the Department of Public Works in the city of Sheboygan.

== Electoral history ==
=== Wisconsin Assembly, 27th district (2022) ===
Year	Election	Date	Elected				Defeated				Total	Plurality
2022	General	Nov. 5	Amy Binsfeld	Republican	17,132	64.41%	Chet Gerlach	Ind.	9,373	35.24%	26,599	7,759

=== Wisconsin Assembly, 26th district (2024) ===
Year	Election	Date	Elected				Defeated				Total	Plurality
2024	General	Nov. 5	Joe Sheehan	Democratic	14,887	51.35%	Amy Binsfeld	Rep.	14,042	48.43%	28,993	845

=== Wisconsin Senate (2026) ===
Year	Election	Date	Elected				Defeated				Total	Plurality
2026	General	Nov. 3	Amy Binsfeld	Republican	41,378	56.22%	Christian Ellis	Ind.	32,225	43.78%	73,603	9,153

Wisconsin State Assembly
Preceded by Tyler Vorpagel	Member of the Wisconsin State Assembly from the 27th district January 3, 2023 – January 6, 2025	Succeeded by Lindee Brill
