= 107th Wisconsin Legislature =

Wisconsin legislative term for 2025–2026

←	106th	108th	→
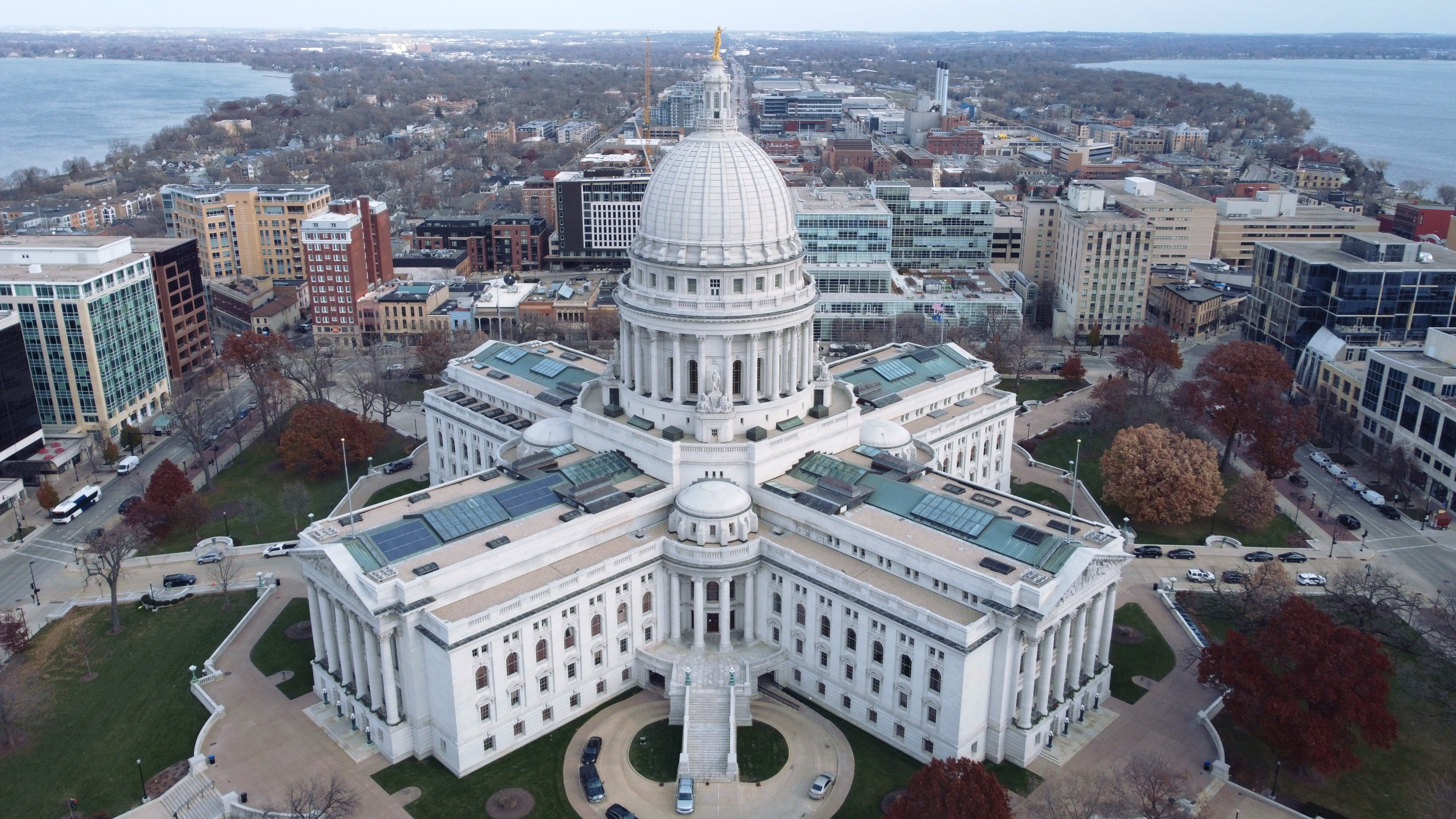
- Wisconsin State Capitol

Overview
- Legislative body: Wisconsin Legislature
- Meeting place: Wisconsin State Capitol
- Term: January 6, 2025 – January 4, 2027
- Election: November 5, 2024

Senate
- Members: 33
- Senate President: Mary Felzkowski (R)
- President pro tempore: Patrick Testin (R)
- Party control: Republican

Assembly
- Members: 99
- Assembly Speaker: Robin Vos (R)
- Speaker pro tempore: Kevin D. Petersen (R)
- Party control: Republican

Sessions
- Regular: January 6, 2025 – present

Special sessions
- Apr. 2026 Spec.: April 14, 2026 – May 14, 2026
- May. 2026 Spec.: May 13, 2026 – May 14, 2026

The One Hundred Seventh Wisconsin Legislature is the current ongoing legislative term in Wisconsin. It was convened on January 6, 2025, in regular session, and is scheduled to conclude on January 4, 2027, though it adjourned for legislative activity on February 20, 2026. The governor has called two special sessions of the legislature, both ended on May 14, 2026, without resolution: a special session to consider a constitutional amendment to ban partisan redistricting began April 14, 2026; a special session to consider a plan to spend down some of the state's budget surplus began May 13, 2026.

This is the first legislative session after the redistricting of the Senate and Assembly according to an act of the previous session.

Senators representing even-numbered districts are newly elected for this session and are serving the first two years of a four-year term. Assembly members are elected to a two-year term. Assembly members and even-numbered senators were elected in the general election of November 5, 2024. Senators representing odd-numbered districts are serving the third and fourth year of their four-year term, having been elected in the general election of November 8, 2022.

The governor of Wisconsin during this term is Democrat Tony Evers, of Dane County, serving the second two years of his second four-year term, having won re-election in the 2022 Wisconsin gubernatorial election. Both the Wisconsin State Assembly and the Wisconsin Senate are led by Republicans, meaning the Legislature faces a rival party in the governor's mansion.

== Major events ==
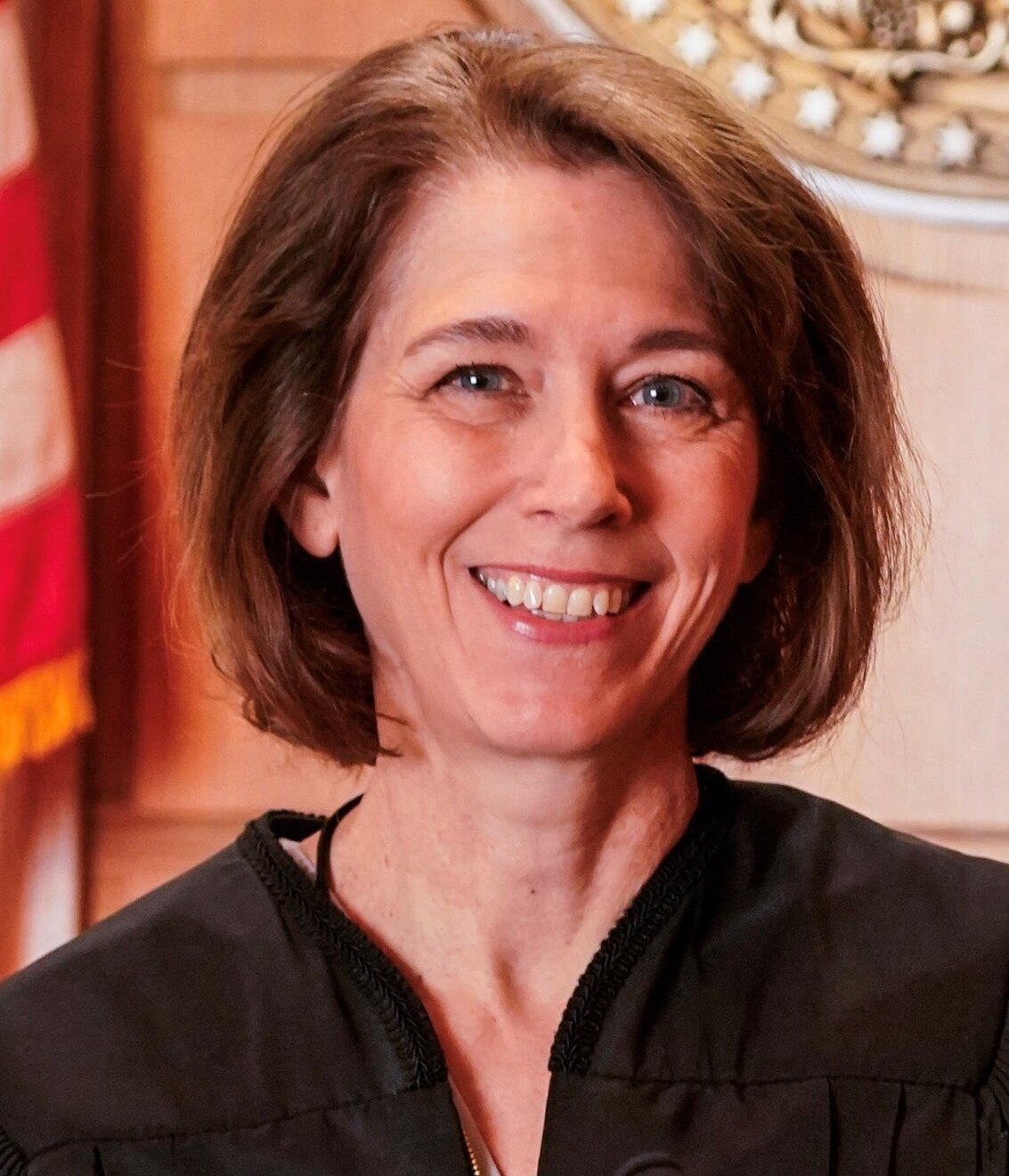
Justice Susan M. Crawford

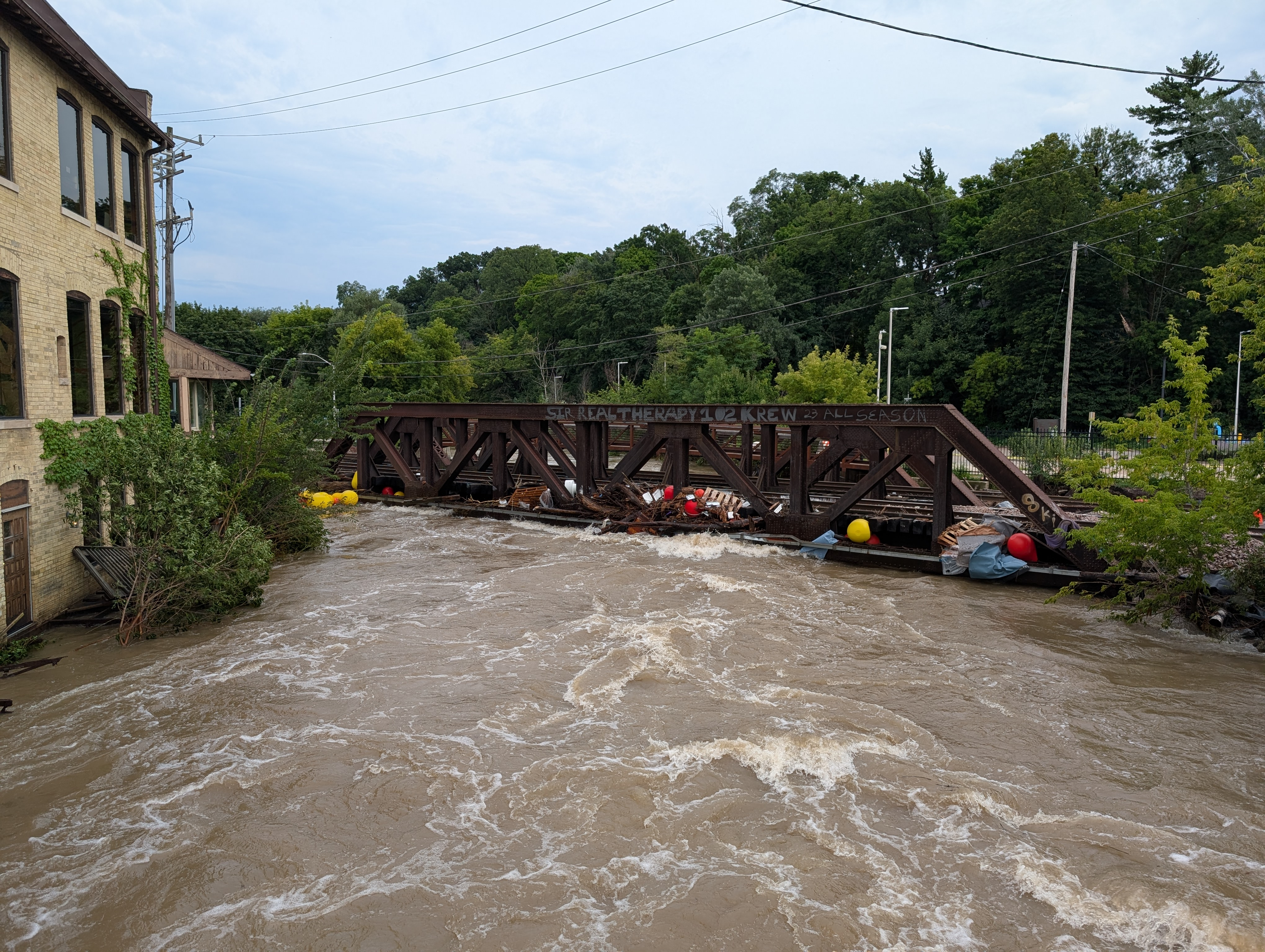
Flooding in Wauwatosa

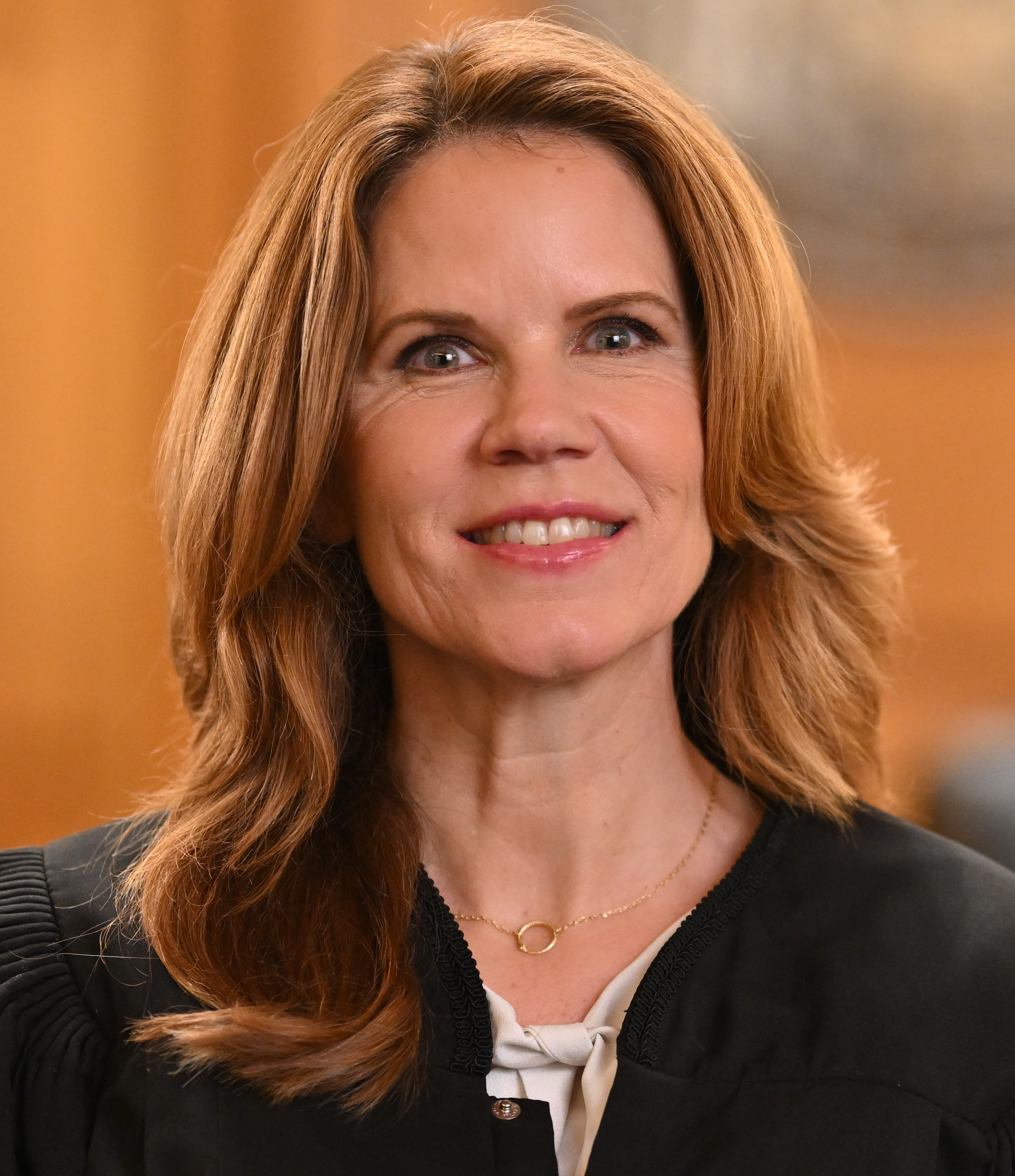
Justice Chris Taylor

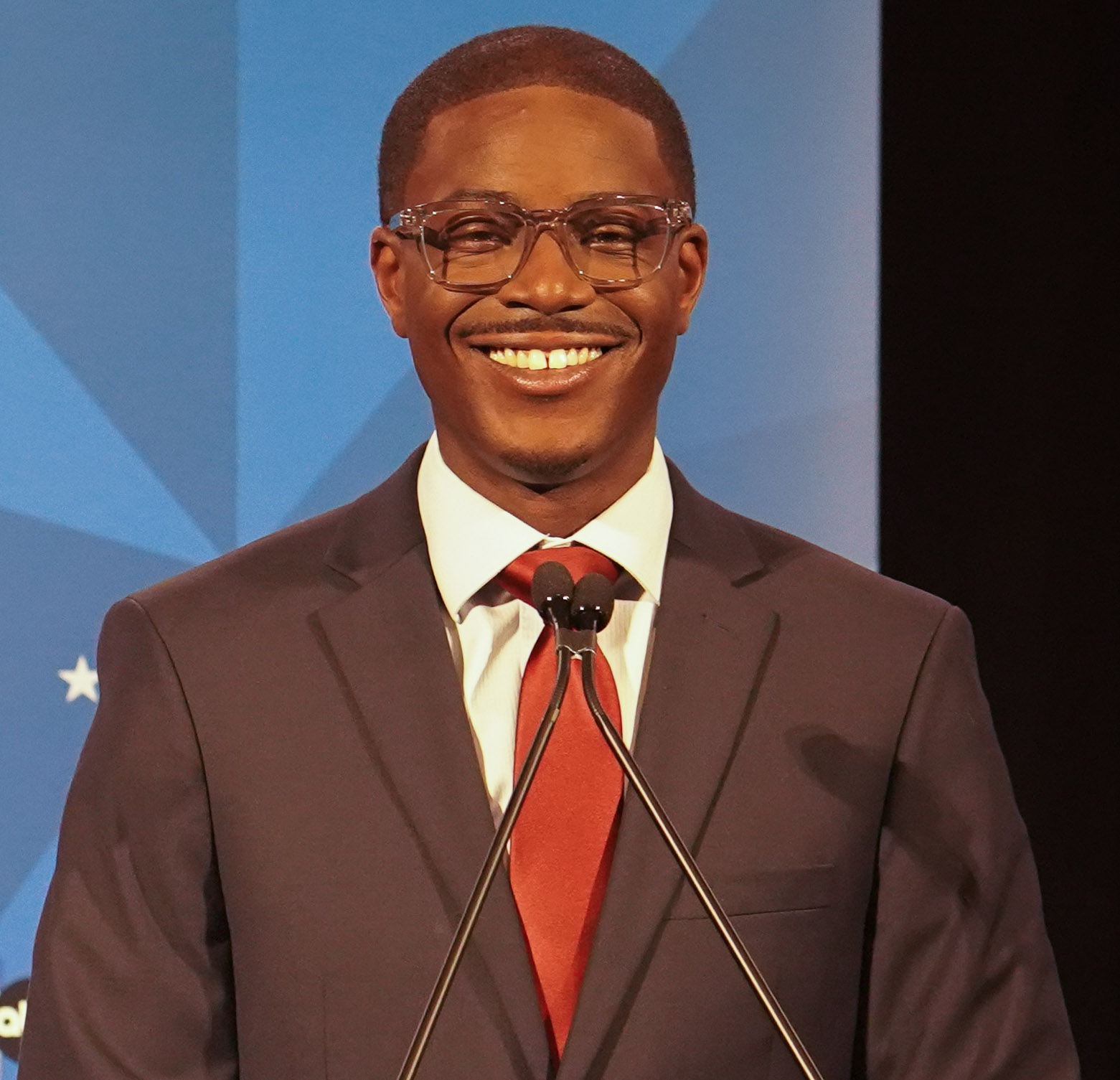
Governor-elect David Crowley

- April 1, 2025: 2025 Wisconsin Spring election:
  - Susan M. Crawford was elected to the Wisconsin Supreme Court to succeed Ann Walsh Bradley.
  - Wisconsin voters ratified an amendment to the state constitution related to voter ID requirements.
- April 24, 2025: Wisconsin circuit court judge Hannah Dugan was arrested by federal agents at the Milwaukee County Courthouse for allegedly assisting an undocumented immigrant evade arrest.
- May 1, 2025: Ann Walsh Bradley became the 28th chief justice of the Wisconsin Supreme Court by a majority vote of the court's members.
- June 14, 2025: Minnesota state representative Melissa Hortman and her husband were assassinated; in a separate incident, the assassin also shot and wounded Minnesota state senator John Hoffman and his wife. A search of the assassin's vehicle revealed a hitlist of 70 further targets, including 11 Wisconsin officials.
- July 1, 2025: Jill Karofsky became the 29th chief justice of the Wisconsin Supreme Court by a majority vote of the court's members.
- July 2, 2025: The Wisconsin Supreme Court released their decision in the case of Kaul v. Urmanski, finding that an 1849 Wisconsin law criminalizing the intentional destruction of an unborn child was implied repealed by subsequent decades of more specific legislation on the topic of abortion. The ruling effectively restored abortion rights in Wisconsin.
- August 9, 2025: Historic rainfall resulted in significant flooding in Milwaukee, Waukesha, Washington, and Ozaukee counties, causing at least two deaths.
- October 23, 2025: The Federal Emergency Management Agency denied Wisconsin's request for federal assistance in the aftermath of August 2025 flooding.
- February 28, 2026: United States and Israeli military forces began strikes against Iran initiating a new war. Iran responded by closing the Strait of Hormuz, causing significant impacts on the global economy. In addition to a spike in the price of energy—which had broad affects—the closure also acutely affected Wisconsin farmers, causing a shortage of fertilizer ahead of farm planting season.
- April 7, 2026:
  - 2026 Wisconsin Spring election:
    - Chris Taylor was elected to the Wisconsin Supreme Court to succeed Rebecca Bradley.
  - The University of Wisconsin Board of Regents voted to fire University president Jay Rothman.
- April 14, 2026: Special legislative session on redistricting began.
- May 13, 2026: Special legislative session on tax relief and education funding began.
- May 14, 2026: Both open special legislative sessions adjourned without passing new legislation.
- October 28, 2026: The Milwaukee Brewers won the 2026 World Series.
- November 3, 2026: 2026 United States general election:
  - David Crowley (D) was elected governor of Wisconsin.
  - 2026 Wisconsin Senate election.
  - 2026 Wisconsin State Assembly election.
  - Voters ratified two amendments to the state constitution:
    - to amend the governor's line-item veto power to prohibit using the power to create, increase, or authorize the creation or increase of any tax or fee.
    - to add a new section to the enumerated rights to prohibit state government from discriminating against or granting preferential treatment to any individual or group on the basis of race, sex, color, ethnicity, or national origin.
  - Voters rejected an amendment to the state constitution which would have exempted religious institutions from state government emergency orders.

== Major legislation ==
- Voter ID amendment (2025 SJR 2): January 14, 2025 – Joint Resolution to create section 1m of article III of the constitution; relating to: requiring photographic identification to vote in any election (second consideration). Second legislative passage of a proposed amendment to the Constitution of Wisconsin, creating a constitutional requirement to present photo identification before voting. This amendment was ratified by voters at the April 2025 election.
- State Budget 2025–2027 (2025 Act 15): July 3, 2025 – An Act relating to: state finances and appropriations, constituting the executive budget act of the 2025 legislature. Governor Tony Evers and speaker Robin Vos urgently negotiated a compromise budget, signing the bill after midnight on July 3 to save more than a billion dollars in federal funding that they would have otherwise lost due to the impending passage of the federal One Big Beautiful Bill Act.
- Banning mobile phones in school classrooms (2025 Act 42): November 1, 2025 – An Act relating to: requiring school boards to adopt policies to prohibit the use of wireless communication devices during instructional time. Wisconsin became the 36th state in the nation to ban mobile phones and other similar devices from classrooms.
- Anti-discrimination amendment (2026 AJR 102): January 27, 2026 – Joint Resolution to create section 27 of article I of the constitution; relating to: prohibiting governmental entity discrimination (second consideration). Second legislative passage of a proposed amendment to the Constitution of Wisconsin, creating a new section clarifying that the state, local, or public school entities cannot give preferential treatment to any group on the basis of race, sex, color, ethnicity, or national origin. This amendment was written to be an anti-affirmative action amendment, but could have far-reaching legal consequences in practice. This amendment was ratified by voters at the 2026 fall general election.
- Line-item veto amendment (2025 SJR 116): February 23, 2026 – Joint Resolution to amend section 10 (1) (c) of article V of the constitution; relating to: prohibiting the governor from using the partial veto to create or increase any tax or fee (second consideration). Second legislative passage of a proposed amendment to the Constitution of Wisconsin, adding new limits to the governor's expansive line-item veto power to prevent the governor from creating a new sentence through partial deletion of other sentences, or from making any partial veto that would result in the creation of a new tax or fee. This amendment was ratified by voters at the 2026 fall general election.
- Extending the safe haven law (2025 Act 94): March 14, 2026 – An Act relating to: various changes to the safe haven law. Allowed for the safe haven law to apply to infants as old as 30 days—increased from 72 hours.
- Postpartum Medicaid coverage (2025 Act 102): March 18, 2026 – An Act relating to: extension of eligibility under the Medical Assistance program for postpartum women. Extends postpartum Medicaid coverage for eligible mothers up to one year after the birth of a child.
- Breast cancer screening "Gail's Law" (2025 Act 103): March 19, 2026 – An Act relating to: coverage of breast cancer screenings by the Medical Assistance program and health insurance policies and plans. The law already required insurance plans to cover an annual mammogram, but this law expanded coverage to include follow-up screenings for women identified as being at high risk of developing cancer. The law was named for activist Gail Zeamer of Neenah, Wisconsin, who died of breast cancer in 2024 after earlier indications of cancer could not be verified due to lack of insurance coverage for screening procedures.
- Name, Image, and Likeness rights for Wisconsin student athletes (2025 Act 203): April 9, 2026 – An Act relating to: name, image, and likeness rights for University of Wisconsin System student athletes; maintenance costs for University of Wisconsin–Madison intercollegiate athletic facilities; employment status of certain student athletes at private nonprofit institutions; and making an appropriation.
- Legalized mobile sports betting (2025 Act 247): April 10, 2026 – An Act relating to: excluding certain event or sports wagers from the definition of "bet". Specified that a bet placed via mobile device located in Wisconsin interacting with a server located on Native American tribal land are deemed to have "taken place" on those Indian lands.

== Party summary ==
=== Senate summary ===
Senate Partisan composition Democratic: 15 seats Republican: 18 seats

Affiliation	Party (Shading indicates majority caucus)		Total	
Affiliation	Democratic	Republican	Total	Vacant
End of previous legislature	10	22	32	1
Start of session	15	18	33	0
Current voting share	45.45%	54.55%		
Beginning of next session	18	15	33	0

=== Assembly summary ===
Assembly Partisan composition Democratic: 45 seats Republican: 54 seats

Affiliation	Party (Shading indicates majority caucus)		Total	
Affiliation	Democratic	Republican	Total	Vacant
End of previous legislature	34	64	98	1
Start of session	45	54	99	0
Current voting share	45.45%	54.55%		
Beginning of next session	53	46	99	0

== Sessions ==
- Regular session: January 6, 2025 – present
- April 2026 special session: April 14, 2026 – May 14, 2026
- May 2026 special session: May 13, 2026 – May 14, 2026

== Leadership ==
=== Senate leadership ===
- President of the Senate: Mary Felzkowski (R–Tomahawk)
- President pro tempore: Patrick Testin (R–Stevens Point)

Senate majority leadership (Republican)

- Senate Majority Leader: Devin LeMahieu (R–Oostburg)
- Assistant Majority Leader: Dan Feyen (R–Fond du Lac)
- Senate Majority Caucus Chair: Van H. Wanggaard (R–Racine)
- Senate Majority Caucus Vice Chair: Rachael Cabral-Guevara (R–Appleton)

Senate minority leadership (Democratic)

- Senate Minority Leader: Dianne Hesselbein (D–Middleton)
- Assistant Minority Leader: Jeff Smith (D–Brunswick)
- Senate Minority Caucus Chair: Mark Spreitzer (D–Beloit)
- Senate Minority Caucus Vice Chair: Dora Drake (D–Milwaukee)

=== Assembly leadership ===
- Speaker of the Assembly: Robin Vos (R–Rochester)
- Speaker pro tempore: Kevin David Petersen (R–Waupaca)

Assembly majority leadership (Republican)

- Assembly Majority Leader: Tyler August (R–Walworth)
- Assistant Majority Leader: Scott Krug (R–Rome)
- Assembly Majority Caucus Chair: Rob Summerfield (R–Bloomer)
- Assembly Majority Caucus Vice Chair: Cindi Duchow (R–Delafield)
- Assembly Majority Caucus Secretary: Nancy VanderMeer (R–Tomah)
- Assembly Majority Caucus Sergeant-at-Arms: Treig Pronschinske (R–Mondovi)

Assembly minority leadership (Democratic)

- Assembly Minority Leader: Greta Neubauer (D–Racine)
- Assistant Minority Leader: Kalan Haywood (D–Milwaukee)
- Assembly Minority Caucus Chair: Lisa Subeck (D–Madison)
- Assembly Minority Caucus Vice Chair: Jill Billings (D–La Crosse)
- Assembly Minority Caucus Secretary: Clinton Anderson (D–Beloit)
- Assembly Minority Caucus Sergeant-at-Arms: Jodi Emerson (D–Eau Claire)

== Members ==
=== Members of the Senate ===
Members of the Senate for the One Hundred Seventh Wisconsin Legislature:

Dist.	Senator	Party	Age	Home	First elected
01	André Jacque	Rep.	46	New Franken, Brown County	2018
02	Eric Wimberger	Rep.	47	Oconto, Oconto County	2020
03	Tim Carpenter	Dem.	66	Milwaukee, Milwaukee County	2002
04	Dora Drake	Dem.	33	Milwaukee, Milwaukee County	2024
05	Rob Hutton	Rep.	59	Brookfield, Waukesha County	2022
06	LaTonya Johnson	Dem.	54	Milwaukee, Milwaukee County	2016
07	Chris Larson	Dem.	44	Milwaukee, Milwaukee County	2010
08	Jodi Habush Sinykin	Dem.	57	Whitefish Bay, Milwaukee County	2024
09	Devin LeMahieu	Rep.	52	Oostburg, Sheboygan County	2014
10	Rob Stafsholt	Rep.	49	New Richmond, St. Croix County	2020
11	Stephen Nass	Rep.	72	Whitewater, Walworth County	2014
12	Mary Felzkowski	Rep.	61	Tomahawk, Lincoln County	2020
13	John Jagler	Rep.	57	Watertown, Jefferson County	2021
14	Sarah Keyeski	Dem.	56	Lodi, Columbia County	2024
15	Mark Spreitzer	Dem.	39	Beloit, Rock County	2022
16	Melissa Ratcliff	Dem.	50	Cottage Grove, Dane County	2024
17	Howard Marklein	Rep.	72	Spring Green, Sauk County	2014
18	Kristin Dassler-Alfheim	Dem.	55	Appleton, Outagamie County	2024
19	Rachael Cabral-Guevara	Rep.	50	Appleton, Outagamie County	2022
20	Dan Feyen	Rep.	58	Fond du Lac, Fond du Lac County	2016
21	Van H. Wanggaard	Rep.	74	Racine, Racine County	2014
22	Robert Wirch	Dem.	82	Pleasant Prairie, Kenosha County	1996
23	Jesse James	Rep.	54	Thorp, Clark County	2022
24	Patrick Testin	Rep.	38	Stevens Point, Portage County	2016
25	Romaine Quinn	Rep.	36	Birchwood, Washburn County	2022
26	Kelda Roys	Dem.	47	Madison, Dane County	2020
27	Dianne Hesselbein	Dem.	55	Middleton, Dane County	2022
28	Julian Bradley	Rep.	45	New Berlin, Waukesha County	2020
29	Cory Tomczyk	Rep.	64	Mosinee, Marathon County	2022
30	Jamie Wall	Dem.	55	Green Bay, Brown County	2024
31	Jeff Smith	Dem.	71	Brunswick, Eau Claire County	2018
32	Brad Pfaff	Dem.	58	Onalaska, La Crosse County	2020
33	Chris Kapenga	Rep.	54	Delafield, Waukesha County	2015

=== Members of the Assembly ===
Members of the Assembly for the One Hundred Seventh Wisconsin Legislature:

Assembly partisan composition Democratic: 45 seats Republican: 54 seats

Sen. Dist.	Dist.	Representative	Party	Age	Residence	First Elected
01	01	Joel Kitchens	Rep	69	Sturgeon Bay	2014
01	02	Shae Sortwell	Rep	41	Two Rivers	2018
01	03	Ron Tusler	Rep	42	Harrison	2016
02	04	David Steffen	Rep	54	Howard	2014
02	05	Joy Goeben	Rep	54	Hobart	2022
02	06	Elijah Behnke	Rep	43	Angelica	2021
03	07	Karen Kirsch	Dem	58	Greenfield	2024
03	08	Sylvia Ortiz-Velez	Dem		Milwaukee	2020
03	09	Priscilla Prado	Dem	43	Milwaukee	2024
04	10	Darrin Madison	Dem	29	Milwaukee	2022
04	11	Sequanna Taylor	Dem	47	Milwaukee	2024
04	12	Russell Goodwin	Dem	44	Milwaukee	2024
05	13	Robyn Vining	Dem	50	Wauwatosa	2018
05	14	Angelito Tenorio	Dem	30	West Allis	2024
05	15	Adam Neylon	Rep	41	Pewaukee	2013
06	16	Kalan Haywood	Dem	27	Milwaukee	2018
06	17	Supreme Moore Omokunde	Dem	47	Milwaukee	2020
06	18	Margaret Arney	Dem	43	Wauwatosa	2024
07	19	Ryan Clancy	Dem	49	Milwaukee	2022
07	20	Christine Sinicki	Dem	66	Milwaukee	1998
07	21	Jessie Rodriguez	Rep	49	Oak Creek	2013
08	22	Paul Melotik	Rep	69	Grafton	2023
08	23	Deb Andraca	Dem	56	Whitefish Bay	2020
08	24	Dan Knodl	Rep	69	Germantown	2008
09	25	Paul Tittl	Rep	64	Manitowoc	2012
09	26	Joe Sheehan	Dem	69	Sheboygan	2024
09	27	Lindee Brill	Rep	45	Sheboygan Falls	2024
10	28	Robin Kreibich	Rep	67	New Richmond	1992
10	29	Treig Pronschinske	Rep	50	Mondovi	2016
10	30	Shannon Zimmerman	Rep	54	River Falls	2016
11	31	Tyler August	Rep	43	Walworth	2010
11	32	Amanda Nedweski	Rep	50	Pleasant Prairie	2022
11	33	Robin Vos	Rep	58	Rochester	2004
12	34	Rob Swearingen	Rep	63	Rhinelander	2012
12	35	Calvin Callahan	Rep	27	Tomahawk	2020
12	36	Jeffrey Mursau	Rep	72	Crivitz	2004
13	37	Mark Born	Rep	50	Beaver Dam	2012
13	38	William Penterman	Rep	30	Hustisford	2021
13	39	Alex Dallman	Rep	34	Markesan	2020
14	40	Karen DeSanto	Dem	62	Baraboo	2024
14	41	Tony Kurtz	Rep	59	Wonewoc	2018
14	42	Maureen McCarville	Dem	68	DeForest	2024
15	43	Brienne Brown	Dem	53	Whitewater	2024
15	44	Ann Roe	Dem	60	Janesville	2024
15	45	Clinton Anderson	Dem	33	Beloit	2022
16	46	Joan Fitzgerald	Dem	62	Fort Atkinson	2024
16	47	Randy Udell	Dem	65	Fitchburg	2024
16	48	Andrew Hysell	Dem	55	Sun Prairie	2024
17	49	Travis Tranel	Rep	41	Cuba City	2010
17	50	Jenna Jacobson	Dem	44	Oregon	2022
17	51	Todd Novak	Rep	61	Dodgeville	2014
18	52	Lee Snodgrass	Dem	57	Appleton	2020
18	53	Dean Kaufert	Rep	69	Neenah	1990
18	54	Lori Palmeri	Dem	59	Oshkosh	2022
19	55	Nate Gustafson	Rep	31	Omro	2022
19	56	Dave Murphy	Rep	71	Hortonville	2012
19	57	Kevin David Petersen	Rep	61	Waupaca	2006
20	58	Rick Gundrum	Rep	61	Slinger	2018
20	59	Robert Brooks	Rep	59	Saukville	2014
20	60	Jerry L. O'Connor	Rep	73	Fond du Lac	2022
21	61	Bob Donovan	Rep	70	Greenfield	2022
21	62	Angelina Cruz	Dem	47	Racine	2024
21	63	Robert Wittke	Rep	69	Caledonia	2018
22	64	Tip McGuire	Dem	39	Kenosha	2019
22	65	Ben DeSmidt	Dem	53	Kenosha	2024
22	66	Greta Neubauer	Dem	35	Racine	2018
23	67	David Armstrong	Rep	65	Rice Lake	2020
23	68	Rob Summerfield	Rep	46	Bloomer	2016
23	69	Karen Hurd	Rep	54	Withee	2022
24	70	Nancy VanderMeer	Rep	67	Tomah	2014
24	71	Vinnie Miresse	Dem	48	Stevens Point	2024
24	72	Scott Krug	Rep	51	Rome	2010
25	73	Angela Stroud	Dem	45	Ashland	2024
25	74	Chanz Green	Rep	35	Mason	2022
25	75	Duke Tucker	Rep	56	Grantsburg	2024
26	76	Francesca Hong	Dem	38	Madison	2020
26	77	Renuka Mayadev	Dem	51–52	Madison	2024
26	78	Shelia Stubbs	Dem	55	Madison	2018
27	79	Lisa Subeck	Dem	55	Madison	2014
27	80	Mike Bare	Dem	43	Verona	2022
27	81	Alex Joers	Dem	34	Waunakee	2022
28	82	Scott Allen	Rep	60	Waukesha	2014
28	83	Dave Maxey	Rep	53	New Berlin	2022
28	84	Chuck Wichgers	Rep	61	Muskego	2016
29	85	Patrick Snyder	Rep	70	Weston	2016
29	86	John Spiros	Rep	65	Marshfield	2012
29	87	Brent Jacobson	Rep	42	Mosinee	2024
30	88	Ben Franklin	Rep	44	De Pere	2024
30	89	Ryan Spaude	Dem	33	Ashwaubanon	2024
30	90	Amaad Rivera-Wagner	Dem	44	Green Bay	2024
31	91	Jodi Emerson	Dem	53	Eau Claire	2018
31	92	Clint Moses	Rep	50	Menomonie	2020
31	93	Christian Phelps	Dem	33	Eau Claire	2024
32	94	Steve Doyle	Dem	68	Onalaska	2011
32	95	Jill Billings	Dem	64	La Crosse	2011
32	96	Tara Johnson	Dem	64	Shelby	2024
33	97	Cindi Duchow	Rep	67	Delafield	2015
33	98	Jim Piwowarczyk	Rep	56	Hubertus	2024
33	99	Barbara Dittrich	Rep	62	Oconomowoc	2018

== Committees ==
=== Senate committees ===
- Senate Committee on Administrative Rules – Sen. Nass, chair
- Senate Committee on Agriculture and Revenue – Sen. Testin, chair
- Senate Committee on Education – Sen. Jagler, chair
- Senate Committee on Finance – Sen. Marklein, chair
- Senate Committee on Financial Institutions and Sporting Heritage – Sen. Stafsholt, chair
- Senate Committee on Government Operations, Labor and Economic Development – Sen. Feyen, chair
- Senate Committee on Health – Sen. Cabral-Guevara, chair
- Senate Committee on Insurance, Housing, Rural Issues and Forestry – Sen. Quinn, chair
- Senate Committee on Judiciary and Public Safety – Sen. Wanggaard, chair
- Senate Committee on Licensing, Regulatory Reform, State and Federal Affairs – Sen. Kapenga, chair
- Senate Committee on Mental Health, Substance Abuse Prevention, Children and Families – Sen. James, chair
- Senate Committee on Natural Resources, Veteran and Military Affairs – Sen. Jacque, chair
- Senate Committee on Senate Organization – Sen. LeMahieu, chair
- Senate Committee on Transportation and Local Government – Sen. Tomczyk, chair
- Senate Committee on Universities and Technical Colleges – Sen. Hutton, chair
- Senate Committee on Utilities, Technology and Tourism – Sen. Bradley, chair
- Senate Special Committee on Oversight of the Department of Justice – Sen. Felzkowski, chair

=== Assembly committees ===
- Assembly Committee for Review of Administrative Rules – Rep. Neylon, co-chair
- Assembly Committee on Agriculture – Rep. Tranel, chair
- Assembly Committee on Assembly Organization – Rep. Vos, chair
- Assembly Committee on Audit – Rep. Wittke, chair
- Assembly Committee on Campaigns and Elections – Rep. Maxey, chair
- Assembly Committee on Children and Families – Rep. Snyder, chair
- Assembly Committee on Colleges and Universities – Rep. Murphy, chair
- Assembly Committee on Commerce – Rep. Kreibich, chair
- Assembly Committee on Constitution and Ethics – Rep. Wichgers, chair
- Assembly Committee on Consumer Protection – Rep. Callahan, chair
- Assembly Committee on Corrections – Rep. Kaufert, chair
- Assembly Committee on Criminal Justice and Public Safety – Rep. Spiros, chair
- Assembly Committee on Education – Rep. Kitchens, chair
- Assembly Committee on Employment Relations – Rep. Vos, co-chair
- Assembly Committee on Energy and Utilities – Rep. Steffen, chair
- Assembly Committee on Environment – Rep. Goeben, chair
- Assembly Committee on Finance – Rep. Born, co-chair
- Assembly Committee on Financial Institutions – Rep. Duchow, chair
- Assembly Committee on Forestry, Parks and Outdoor Recreation – Rep. Mursau, chair
- Assembly Committee on Government Operations, Accountability, and Transparency – Rep. Nedweski, chair
- Assembly Committee on Health, Aging and Long-Term Care – Rep. Moses, chair
- Assembly Committee on Housing and Real Estate – Rep. Brooks, chair
- Assembly Committee on Insurance – Rep. Dittrich, chair
- Assembly Committee on Jobs and Economy – Rep. Gundrum, chair
- Assembly Committee on Judiciary – Rep. Tusler, chair
- Assembly Committee on Local Government – Rep. Novak, chair
- Assembly Committee on Mental Health and Substance Abuse Prevention – Rep. Tittl, chair
- Assembly Committee on Public Benefit Reform – Rep. Knodl, chair
- Assembly Committee on Regulatory Licensing Reform – Rep. Sortwell, chair
- Assembly Committee on Rules – Rep. August, chair
- Assembly Committee on Rural Development – Rep. Behnke, chair
- Assembly Committee on Science, Technology, and AI – Rep. Gustafson, chair
- Assembly Committee on Small Business Development – Rep. Armstrong, chair
- Assembly Committee on Sporting Heritage – Rep. Pronschinske, chair
- Assembly Committee on State Affairs – Rep. Swearingen, chair
- Assembly Committee on State and Federal Relations – Rep. Allen, chair
- Assembly Committee on Tourism – Rep. Green, chair
- Assembly Committee on Transportation – Rep. VanderMeer, chair
- Assembly Committee on Urban Revitalization – Rep. Donovan, chair
- Assembly Committee on Veterans and Military Affairs – Rep. Penterman, chair
- Assembly Committee on Ways and Means – Rep. O'Connor, chair
- Assembly Committee on Workforce Development, Labor, and Integrated Employment – Rep. Melotik, chair
- Assembly Speaker's Task Force on Elder Services – Rep. Snyder, chair
- Assembly Speaker's Task Force on Government Efficiency and Modernization – Rep. Piwowarczyk, chair
- Assembly Speaker's Task Force on Protecting Kids – Rep. Brill, chair
- Assembly Speaker's Task Force on Rulemaking – Rep. B. Jacobson, chair

=== Joint committees ===
- Joint Legislative Audit Committee – Sen. Wimberger & Rep. Wittke, co-chairs
- Joint Legislative Council – Sen. Felzkowski & Rep. Vos, co-chairs
- Joint Committee for Review of Administrative Rules – Sen. Nass & Rep. Neylon, co-chairs
- Joint Committee on Employment Relations – Sen. Felzkowski & Rep. Vos, co-chairs
- Joint Committee on Finance – Sen. Marklein & Rep. Born, co-chairs
- Joint Committee on Information Policy and Technology – Sen. Bradley & Rep. Gustafson, co-chairs
- Joint Committee on Legislative Organization – Sen. Felzkowski & Rep. Vos, co-chairs
- Joint Review Committee on Criminal Penalties – Sen. Hutton & Rep. Krug, co-chairs
- Joint Survey Committee on Retirement Systems – Sen. Feyen & Rep. August, co-chairs
- Joint Survey Committee on Tax Exemptions – Sen. Testin & Rep. August, co-chairs

== Employees ==
=== Senate employees ===
- Chief Clerk: Rick Champagne
- Sergeant at Arms: Tom Engels

=== Assembly employees ===
- Chief Clerk: Ted Blazel
- Sergeant at Arms: Anne Tonnon Byers

== See also ==
- 2022 Wisconsin elections
  - 2022 Wisconsin Senate election
  - 2022 Wisconsin State Assembly election
- 2024 Wisconsin elections
  - 2024 Wisconsin Senate election
  - 2024 Wisconsin State Assembly election
