= Calvin Potter =

20th century American politician

Member of the Wisconsin Senate from the 9th district
- In office January 7, 1991 – January 4, 1999
- Preceded by: William Te Winkle
- Succeeded by: James Baumgart

Member of the Wisconsin State Assembly
- In office January 7, 1985 – January 7, 1991
- Preceded by: Wayne W. Wood
- Succeeded by: James Baumgart
- Constituency: 26th Assembly district
- In office January 3, 1983 – January 7, 1985
- Preceded by: Midge Miller
- Succeeded by: Spencer Black
- Constituency: 77th Assembly district
- In office January 6, 1975 – January 3, 1983
- Preceded by: Bill B. Bruhy
- Succeeded by: Marlin Schneider
- Constituency: 59th Assembly district

Personal details
- Born: November 3, 1945 (age 81) Sheboygan, Wisconsin, U.S.
- Party: Democrat
- Spouse: married
- Education: Lakeland College (B.A.)
- Profession: Educator

Calvin Potter (born November 3, 1945) is a retired American teacher and Democratic politician from Sheboygan County, Wisconsin. He served 8 years in the Wisconsin Senate (1991–1999) and 16 years in the State Assembly (1975–1991).

== Early life and education ==
Potter was born and raised in Sheboygan, Wisconsin. He graduated from Sheboygan North High School and attended the University of Wisconsin-Sheboygan, before earning his bachelor's degree from Lakeland College in 1968.

== Career ==
Potter was elected to the Assembly in 1974. Later, he was a member of the Senate. Previously, he had chaired the Sheboygan County Democratic Party.

Wisconsin State Assembly
Preceded by Bill B. Bruhy	Member of the Wisconsin State Assembly from the 59th district January 6, 1975 – January 3, 1983	Succeeded by Marlin Schneider
Preceded by Midge Miller	Member of the Wisconsin State Assembly from the 77th district January 3, 1983 – January 7, 1985	Succeeded by Spencer Black
Preceded by Wayne W. Wood	Member of the Wisconsin State Assembly from the 26th district January 7, 1985 – January 7, 1991	Succeeded by James Baumgart
Wisconsin Senate
Preceded by William Te Winkle	Member of the Wisconsin Senate from the 9th district January 7, 1991 – January 4, 1999	Succeeded by James Baumgart
