= Lindee Brill =

21st century American politician

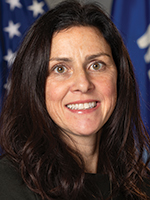
- Official portrait

Member of the Wisconsin State Assembly from the 27th district
- Incumbent
- Assumed office January 6, 2025
- Preceded by: Amy Binsfeld

Personal details
- Born: Lindee Rae Claerbout; June 27, 1981 (age 45) Kohler, Wisconsin, U.S.
- Party: Republican
- Spouses: Cesar Salazar (m. 2009; div. 2011); Eric J. Brill
- Children: 3
- Education: Hope College (B.A.)
- Occupation: Marketing professional, politician
- Website: Official website Campaign website

Lindee Rae Brill (née Claerbout; born June 27, 1981) is an American marketing professional and Republican politician from Sheboygan County, Wisconsin. She is a member of the Wisconsin State Assembly, representing Wisconsin's 27th Assembly district since 2025. She was also previously known as Lindee Rae Salazar, during her first marriage.

== Early life and education ==
Lindee Brill was born Lindee Claerbout, in June 1981 at Kohler, Wisconsin, just outside of Sheboygan. She was raised in the Sheboygan area, graduating from Oostburg High School in 1999. She went on to attend Hope College in Holland, Michigan, earning her bachelor's degree in 2003, studying management and Spanish. While attending Hope College, she spent a semester abroad at Pontifical Catholic University of Chile in 2001.

After graduating from college, she worked for about a year in human resources at Sterling Plumbing in Union City, Tennessee, before returning to the Sheboygan area as human resources director for Dutchland Plastics in 2005. She had previously worked at Dutchland in entry-level roles during high school. Over the next 2 decades, she worked in marketing for a number of other Sheboygan businesses and nonprofits, including the Sheboygan County YMCA, Oostburg State Bank, and Anchor of Hope Health Center (a pro-life pregnancy center), and finally Samaritan's Hand (an addiction treatment center).

== Political career ==
Brill made her first run for elected office in 2024, when she announced that she would run for Wisconsin State Assembly in the 27th Assembly district. The 27th district had been represented by Amy Binsfeld, but the 2024 redistricting act had dramatically redrawn the districts in the Sheboygan area, and Binsfield was drawn out of the district. Another Republican incumbent, Terry Katsma, was drawn into the district, but chose to retire. The new 27th district was safely Republican, and Brill faced a challenging Republican Party primary against Oostburg village president Brian Hilbelink. The primary was fiercely contested, and Brill was a target of negative ads from a PAC called Stronger Wisconsin Fund, which advertised against several Republican primary candidates. The PAC was funded by another PAC, known as Americans for Security Inc., which had also been a major contributor to a PAC which exclusively supported Republican Assembly speaker Robin Vos. Brill won the primary by just 249 votes. She easily won the general election with 67% of the vote. She took office in January 2025.

During the opening session of the 107th Wisconsin legislature, Brill abstained from voting for incumbent Speaker of the Assembly, and fellow Republican, Robin Vos.

On October 3, Brill, alongside fellow freshman representative Jim Piwowarczyk, proposed a ban on the sale of hemp-derived THC products in the state of Wisconsin. Additionally, Brill has opposed the legalization of marijuana in the state.

On November 4, Brill proposed banning ballot drop-boxes in the state.

In January 2026, a proposal authored by Brill, alongside state senator Stephen Nass, that would prevent individuals from changing the biological sex listed on their birth certificates, while also defining sex based on sex chromosomes.

== Personal life and family ==
Lindee Brill is one of two children born to Daven and Teresa (née Wachter) Claerbout. Her mother was an active volunteer for the Republican Party and pro-life causes.

Lindee Claerbout took the last name Salazar when she married Cesar Salazar in 2009. They had been coworkers at Dutchland Plastics, but divorced just two years later.

Lindee subsequently married Eric J. Brill of Sheboygan and took his last name. They have three children and reside in the town of Sheboygan Falls, Wisconsin.

== Electoral history ==
=== Wisconsin Assembly (2024) ===
Year	Election	Date	Elected				Defeated				Total	Plurality
2024	Primary	Aug. 13	Lindee Rae Brill	Republican	4,670	51.33%	Brian Hilbelink	Rep.	4,421	48.59%	9,098	249
2024	General	Nov. 5	Lindee Rae Brill	Republican	25,477	67.66%	Kay Ladson	Dem.	12,139	32.24%	37,657	13,338

Wisconsin State Assembly
Preceded by Amy Binsfeld	Member of the Wisconsin State Assembly from the 27th district January 6, 2025 – present	Incumbent
