= James Baumgart =

American politician

Member of the Wisconsin Senate from the 9th district
- In office January 1, 1999 – January 1, 2003
- Preceded by: Calvin Potter
- Succeeded by: Joe Leibham

Member of the Wisconsin State Assembly from the 26th district
- In office January 7, 1991 – January 4, 1999
- Preceded by: Calvin Potter
- Succeeded by: Joe Leibham

Personal details
- Born: December 22, 1938 (age 87) Sheboygan, Wisconsin, U.S.
- Party: Democratic
- Children: 1
- Profession: Politician

James Baumgart (born December 22, 1938) is a former member of the Wisconsin State Assembly and the Wisconsin State Senate.

He was born in Gibson, Wisconsin, United States. He graduated from Sheboygan North High School in Sheboygan, Wisconsin before attending the University of Wisconsin-Sheboygan and the University of Wisconsin-Stevens Point. Baumgart has served in the United States Army and has been active with the Boy Scouts of America and the Izaak Walton League. He is married and has one daughter from a previous marriage.

== Political career ==
Baumgart was elected to the Senate in 1998. Previously, he had been a member of the Assembly from 1990 to 1996. He is a Democrat.
