= Steve Kestell =

American politician

Member of the Wisconsin State Assembly from the 27th district
- In office January 4, 1999 – January 5, 2015
- Preceded by: Clifford Otte
- Succeeded by: Tyler Vorpagel

Personal details
- Born: June 15, 1955 (age 71) Lyndon, Sheboygan County, Wisconsin
- Party: Republican
- Profession: Politician

Steve Kestell (born June 15, 1955) is a Wisconsin politician, legislator, and business owner.

Kestell was born in Lyndon, Wisconsin Kestell graduated from Plymouth High School

== Political career ==
In 1998, Kestell was elected to the Wisconsin State Assembly and has been in the assembly since 1999.

Kestell voted against the state budget in 2013, citing too many non-fiscal policy items contained within the budget. It was Kestell's contention that policy changes should pass through the regular legislative process.

== Personal life ==
Kestell is married and has three children.

Wisconsin State Assembly
Preceded by Clifford Otte	Member of the Wisconsin State Assembly from the 27th district 1999-2015	Succeeded by Tyler Vorpagel
