= Joe Sheehan (politician) =

21st century American politician

Joe Sheehan Ph.D.

Member of the Wisconsin State Assembly from the 26th district
- Incumbent
- Assumed office January 6, 2025
- Preceded by: Terry Katsma

Superintendent of the Sheboygan Area School District
- In office November 1999 – July 1, 2018 Serving with Jeanne Bitkers (until Jul. 2005)
- Preceded by: Bill Hittman
- Succeeded by: Seth Harvatine

Personal details
- Born: December 22, 1957 (age 68) Binghamton, New York, U.S.
- Party: Democratic
- Spouses: Lynn J. Wilder (m. 1984; div. 1998); Barbara Ann Kesner (m. 2002)
- Children: 4
- Education: Michigan State University (B.A.); University of Houston (M.Ed.); Marquette University (Ph.D.)
- Occupation: Educator, politician
- Website: Official website Campaign website

Joseph Milton Sheehan (born December 22, 1957) is an American educator and Democratic politician from Sheboygan, Wisconsin. He is a member of the Wisconsin State Assembly, representing Wisconsin's 26th Assembly district since 2025. He previously served two years as executive director of the Sheboygan County Economic Development Corporation, and served 18 years as the superintendent of the Sheboygan Area School District.

== Biography ==
Joe Sheehan was born on December 22, 1957, in Binghamton, New York, and raised in Michigan. During his youth he attended North Muskegon High School, graduating in 1976. Following his graduation he attended Michigan State University, earning two bachelor's degrees in 1981, in social science secondary education and psychology. He continued his education at the University of Houston, where he obtained his master's degree in 1987.

After working as a teacher and assistant principal in Houston, Sheehan was hired as an assistant principal in the Sheboygan Area School District, at Urban Middle School, in 1989. He then became principal of James Madison Elementary School in 1990. While working in Sheboygan, Sheehan pursued a doctorate at Marquette University, earning his Ph.D. in 1995.

Shortly after completing his doctorate, he was hired as director of personnel for the Sheboygan Area School District, before becoming co-superintendent of the district in 1999. The shared office continued until 2005, when Sheehan became sole superintendent. He ultimately served 18 years as co-superintendent and superintendent.

He retired from his role as superintendent in 2018, but was then hired to become the first executive director of the Sheboygan County Economic Development Corporation. He served two more years in that role before retiring to work as a private leadership coach.

== Political career ==
In April 2024, Sheehan announced his candidacy for Wisconsin State Assembly in the recently redrawn 26th Assembly district. Since the 2011 redistricting, Sheboygan had been split between two Assembly districts in order to dilute the political power of the Democratic votes in the city. The 2024 redistricting act reunited all of Sheboygan in the 26th district, making it one of the most competitive swing districts in the state. No incumbent resided in the new 26th district, but 27th district incumbent Republican Amy Binsfeld chose to relocate to run in the 26th district rather than facing a difficult primary against fellow incumbent Paul Tittl.

The general election in the 26th district was one of the closest in the state; Sheehan prevailed with about 51.4% of the vote.

== Personal life and family ==
Sheehan married Lynn J. Wilder on July 21, 1984, in Muskegon, Michigan; they divorced in 1998. He subsequently married fellow divorcee, Barbara Ann Ackley (née Kesner). He has four adult children and two grandchildren.

== Electoral history ==
=== Wisconsin Assembly (2024) ===
Wisconsin Assembly, 26th District Election, 2024
Party	Candidate	Votes	%	±%
General Election, November 5, 2024
Democratic	Joe Sheehan	14,887	51.35%	+14.23pp
Republican	Amy Binsfeld	14,042	48.43%	−14.37pp
	Scattering	64	0.22%	
Plurality		845	2.91%	-22.77pp
Total votes		28,993	100.0%	+13.37%
Democratic gain from Republican				

Wisconsin State Assembly
Preceded by Terry Katsma	Member of the Wisconsin State Assembly from the 26th district January 6, 2025 – present	Incumbent
Educational offices
Preceded by Bill Hittman	Superintendent of the Sheboygan Area School District; November 1999 – July 1, 2018; Served alongside: Jeanne Bitkers (until Jul. 2005)	Succeeded by Seth Harvatine
