= Devin LeMahieu =

American politician (born 1972)

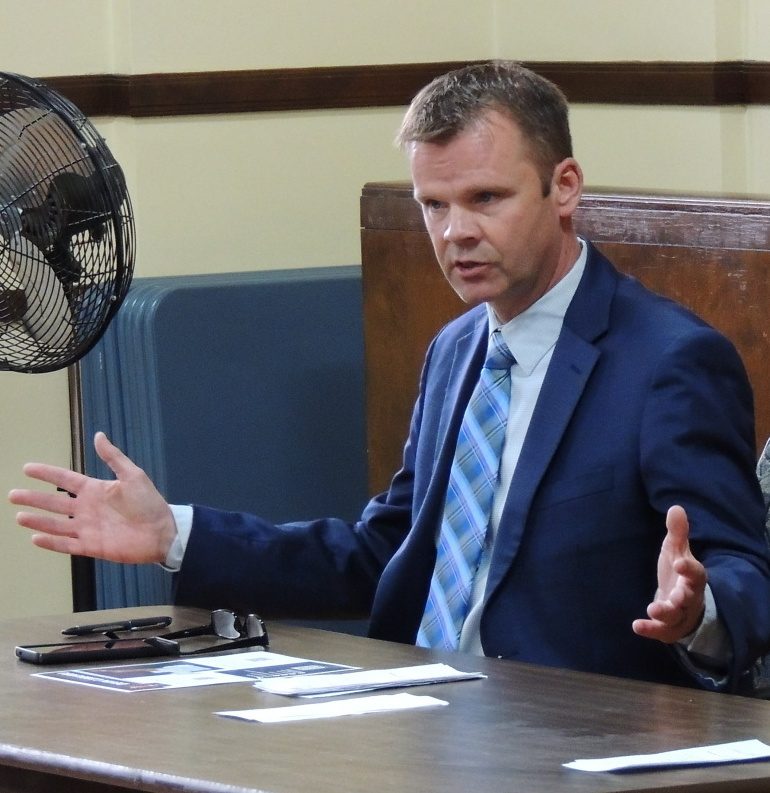
- LeMahieu in 2025

Majority Leader of the Wisconsin Senate
- Incumbent
- Assumed office January 4, 2021
- Preceded by: Scott L. Fitzgerald

Member of the Wisconsin Senate from the 9th district
- Incumbent
- Assumed office January 3, 2015
- Preceded by: Joe Leibham

Personal details
- Born: August 8, 1972 (age 54) Sheboygan, Wisconsin, U.S.
- Party: Republican
- Relatives: Daniel LeMahieu (father)
- Education: Dordt University (BA)
- Website: Official website

Devin LeMahieu (born August 8, 1972) is an American businessman and Republican politician from Sheboygan County, Wisconsin. He is the current majority leader of the Wisconsin Senate, since 2021, and has represented Wisconsin's 9th Senate district since 2015. He previously served nine years on the Sheboygan County board of supervisors. His father, Daniel LeMahieu, served 12 years in the Wisconsin State Assembly.

== Early life, education and career ==
Devin LeMahieu was born in Sheboygan, Wisconsin, and has lived most of his life in the Sheboygan area. He graduated from Sheboygan County Christian High School in 1991, and went on to attend Dordt College/Dordt University, in Sioux Center, Iowa; he earned his bachelor's degree in 1995 with a double major in business administration and political science.

After college, LeMahieu began working for the Lakeshore Weekly advertiser, which his father owned. He later took over ownership of the paper.

== Early political career ==
LeMahieu was involved in politics from an early age because of his father's active role in the local Republican Party. In 2006, he made his first bid for public office, running for an open seat on the Sheboygan County board of supervisors. He won the election without opposition and went on to serve on the board for the next nine years.

LeMahieu made his first run for the Wisconsin Legislature in 2012, when he launched a primary challenge against Republican incumbent Mike Endsley in the 26th Assembly district. In announcing his run, LeMahieu stated that his campaign wasn't intended as opposition to any particular policy or vote from Endsley, but was merely an acknowledgement that the district had been significantly reshaped by the 2011 redistricting act to include vast portions of southern Sheboygan County, including LeMahieu's home in Oostburg. LeMahieu ultimately fell short in the primary, receiving 40% of the vote.

== Wisconsin Senate ==
Two years after his loss in the Assembly primary, LeMahieu seized another opportunity to run for state office when incumbent state senator Joe Leibham announced he would run for U.S. House of Representatives rather than seeking another term representing Wisconsin's 9th Senate district. This time, LeMahieu faced no opponent in the primary and went on to the general election against Democratic candidate Martha Laning. The 9th Senate district then comprised most of Sheboygan and Manitowoc counties and part of Calumet County, and was a safely Republican seat; LeMahieu prevailed with 60% of the vote. He took office at the start of the 101st Wisconsin Legislature, and resigned from the county board.

During his first term in the Senate, he was assigned chair of the Senate Committee on Elections and Local Government, and was Senate co-chair of the Joint Survey Committee on Tax Exemptions. LeMahieu was easily re-elected in 2018.

In the 2020 general election, Wisconsin Senate majority leader Scott L. Fitzgerald was elected to the U.S. House of Representatives, leaving his leadership position vacant. In a closed caucus meeting, the Senate Republicans elected LeMahieu as their majority leader just days after the 2020 election.

He supports flattening Wisconsin's tax code to provide tax relief to the middle class, and has proposed gradually transitioning Wisconsin to a flat tax, a move he said would "fundamentally transform Wisconsin's individual income tax and keep more money in the pockets of hardworking families." During his tenure as majority leader, the two largest income tax cuts in Wisconsin's history were signed into law with bipartisan support.

In 2017, LeMahieu authored the Regulations from the Executive in Need of Scrutiny (REINS) Act. REINS improved transparency in Wisconsin's rulemaking process by allowing additional public input and required that administrative rules costing more than $10 million be passed by the legislature as a whole. Similar legislation has since been considered at the federal level and in statehouses across the country.

LeMahieu is known for his calm, pragmatic demeanor and was featured in the Capital Times for legislating out of the limelight.

On March 19, 2026, LeMahieu announced that he would not run for re-election in the 2026 election.

== Electoral history ==
=== Wisconsin Assembly (2012) ===
Year	Election	Date	Elected				Defeated				Total	Plurality
2012	Primary	Aug. 14	Mike Endsley (inc)	Republican	5,144	59.93%	Devin LeMahieu	Rep.	3,427	39.93%	8,583	1,717

=== Wisconsin Senate (2014–2022) ===
Year	Election	Date	Elected				Defeated				Total	Plurality
2014	General	Nov. 4	Devin LeMahieu	Republican	43,186	59.95%	Martha Laning	Dem.	28,770	39.94%	72,035	14,416
2018	General	Nov. 6	Devin LeMahieu (inc)	Republican	44,680	58.47%	Kyle Whelton	Dem.	31,684	41.47%	76,409	12,996
2022	Primary	Aug. 9	Devin LeMahieu (inc)	Republican	16,963	71.36%	Ruth Villareal	Rep.	4,342	10.23%	23,770	12,621
2022	Primary	Aug. 9	Devin LeMahieu (inc)	Republican	16,963	71.36%	Jeanette Deschene	Rep.	2,431	18.27%	23,770	12,621
2022	General	Nov. 8	Devin LeMahieu (inc)	Republican	57,836	93.64%	Jarrod Schroeder (write-in)	Dem.	1,237	2.00%	61,765	56,599

Wisconsin Senate
Preceded by Scott L. Fitzgerald	Majority Leader of the Wisconsin Senate; 2021–present	Incumbent
