= Joe Leibham =

American business executive (born 1969)

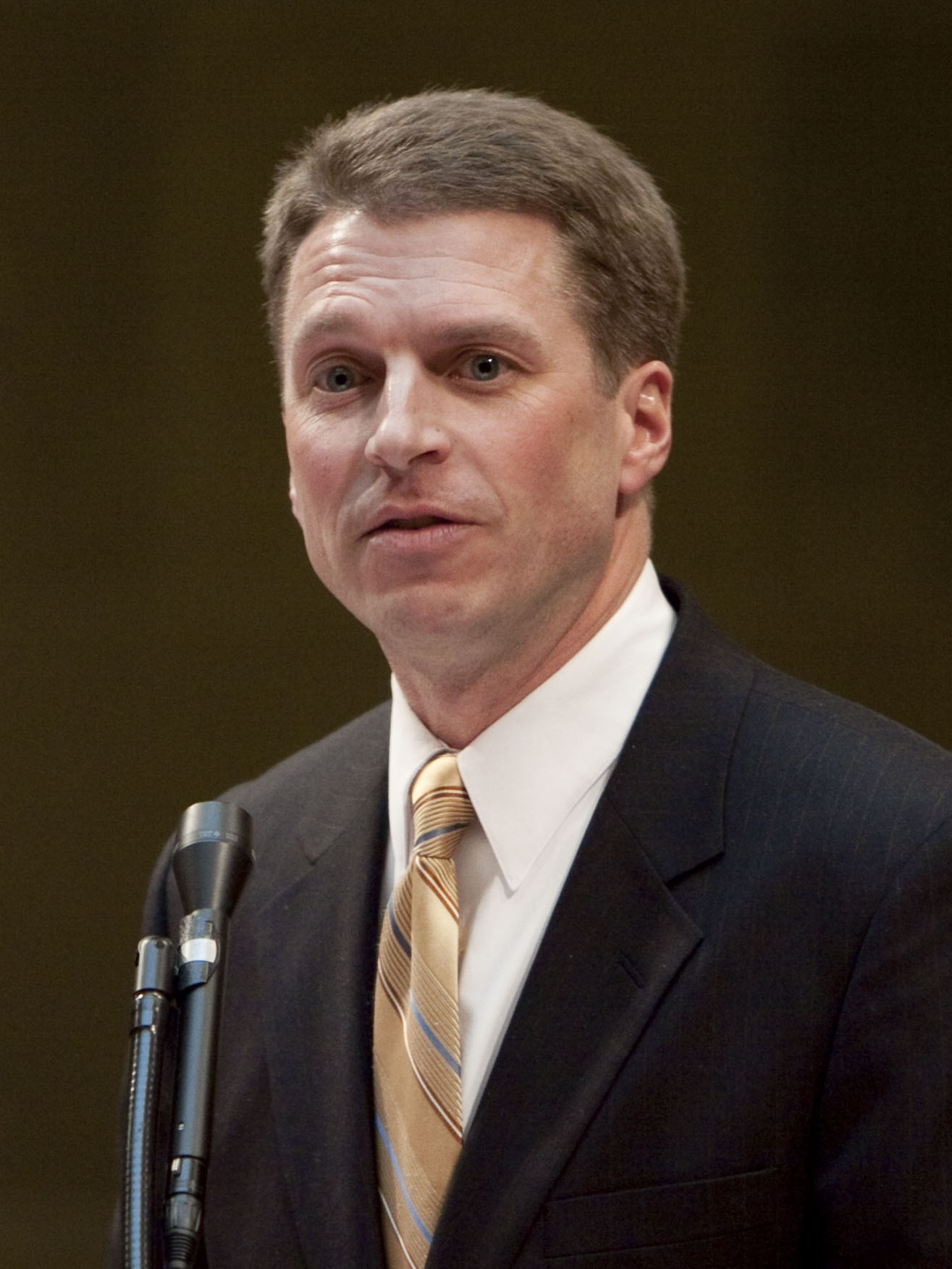
- Leibham in 2009

Member of the Wisconsin Senate from the 9th district
- In office January 6, 2003 – December 1, 2014
- Preceded by: James Baumgart
- Succeeded by: Devin LeMahieu

Member of the Wisconsin State Assembly from the 26th district
- In office January 4, 1999 – January 6, 2003
- Preceded by: James Baumgart
- Succeeded by: Terry Van Akkeren

Personal details
- Born: June 6, 1969 (age 57) Sheboygan, Wisconsin, U.S.
- Party: Republican
- Spouse(s): Heather (née Hanson); 3 children
- Profession: Businessman, lobbyist

Joseph K. Leibham (born June 6, 1969) is an American business executive and lobbyist who served as a Republican member of the Wisconsin Senate, representing the 9th District from 2002 to 2014. He previously served in the Wisconsin Assembly, representing the 26th district from 1998 to 2002.

In December 2014, he resigned from the Senate, to become chief lobbyist for the Milwaukee-based law firm of Foley & Lardner.

Leibham is married to Heather (née Hanson); they have two sons and a daughter.

== Early life, education and career ==
Leibham was born and raised in Sheboygan, the fourth oldest of 13 children. He attended Pigeon River Public Elementary School, Trinity Lutheran School and Sheboygan Area Lutheran High School. He attended the University of Wisconsin–La Crosse and Ealing College (London) before graduating from the University of Wisconsin–Madison in 1991 with a B.A. in Political Science and Public Administration.

He worked in the food service industry as an account executive for Sargento Foods and the manager of membership development for the Sheboygan County Chamber of Commerce.

== Political career ==
=== Sheboygan City Council ===
From 1993 to 2000, Leibham served on the Sheboygan City Council serving as its president from 1995 to 1996.

=== Wisconsin State Assembly ===
Leibham served in the Wisconsin State Assembly from 1998 to 2002, representing Sheboygan, Sheboygan Falls, Kohler and surrounding areas.

=== Wisconsin State Senate ===
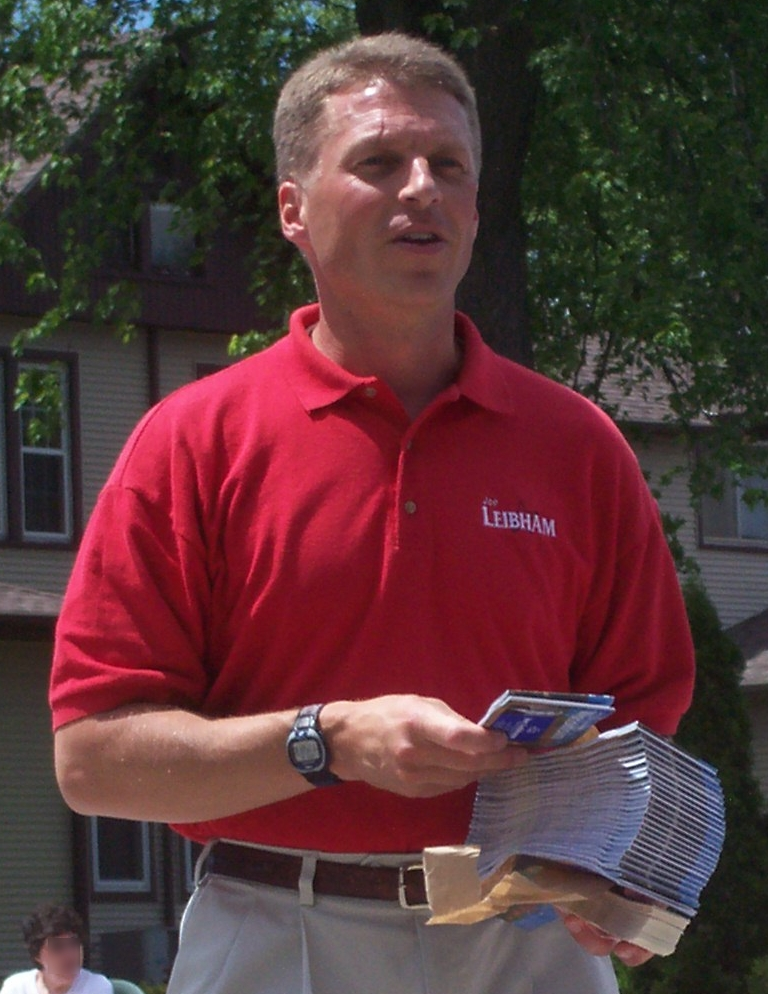
Leibham in 2008

In 2002, Leibham announced his candidacy for the 9th Senate District. He narrowly defeated, by 46 votes, James Baumgart.

His 9th Senate District comprises the northern half of Sheboygan and southern half of Manitowoc counties, as well as portions of Calumet and Fond du Lac counties. He served as the Senate President Pro Tempore. He was the assistant minority leader in 2007 and the majority caucus vice chairperson in 2003.

Leibham has called for the repeal of the Affordable Care Act, calling it a "top priority."

In December 2014, he resigned from the Senate, saying he was prohibited by state law from discussing job offers in the private sector while he was a sitting legislator. Two days later, it was announced that Leibham would accept a position as chief lobbyist for the Milwaukee-based law firm of Foley & Lardner.

== Congressional bid ==
In 2014, rather than seek re-election, Leibham ran in the Republican primary election for the United States House of Representatives; he lost to Glenn Grothman.

Wisconsin State Assembly
Preceded by James Baumgart	Member of the Wisconsin State Assembly from the 26th district 1999–2003	Succeeded by Terry Van Akkeren
Wisconsin Senate
Preceded by James Baumgart	Member of the Wisconsin Senate from the 9th district 2003-2014	Succeeded by Devin LeMahieu
