= William Te Winkle =

American politician

William Te Winkle (born June 30, 1954) is a former member of the Wisconsin State Senate.

== Biography ==
Te Winkle was born in Sheboygan, Wisconsin. He graduated from Sheboygan North High School before graduating magna cum laude from Hope College and from the University of Wisconsin Law School. Te Winkle became a member of Phi Beta Kappa society and Pi Sigma Alpha. Later, he served as an instructor at Lakeshore Technical College. He is married with two children.

== Political career ==
Te Winkle was a member of the Senate during the 1987 and 1989 sessions. Previously, he chaired the Sheboygan County, Wisconsin Democratic Party.
