= Tyler Vorpagel =

American politician

Member of the Wisconsin State Assembly from the 27th district
- In office January 5, 2015 – June 1, 2022
- Preceded by: Steve Kestell
- Succeeded by: Amy Binsfeld

Personal details
- Born: March 24, 1985 (age 41) Plymouth, Wisconsin, U.S.
- Party: Republican
- Spouse: Jenny
- Children: 1
- Education: University of Wisconsin–Green Bay (BA, BS)

Tyler Vorpagel (born March 24, 1985) is an American Republican politician. He is a former member of the Wisconsin State Assembly, representing the 27th Assembly district from 2015 through 2022.

== Biography ==
Born in Plymouth, Wisconsin, Vorpagel graduated from Plymouth High School in 2003. He went on to the University of Wisconsin–Green Bay, where he earned his bachelor's degree in political science and public administration in 2007. After graduating, he was employed as a staffer for Congressman Tom Petri, and was later promoted to district director. Vorpagel became well known in the local Republican Party of Wisconsin and was elected as a delegate to the 2012 Republican National Convention.

In 2014, Vorpagel entered the race for Wisconsin State Assembly in the 5th district seat being vacated by Steve Kestell, who was not running for another term. Vorpagel immediately unveiled endorsements from Plymouth Mayor Don Pohlman and State Representative André Jacque, of the neighboring 2nd State Assembly district. He faced a close contest in the Republican primary, and prevailed with 36% of the vote. He went on to defeat Democrat Scott Grover Heinig with 64% of the vote in the November general election. He was subsequently reelected in 2016 and 2018 by a similar margin. He did not face an opponent in 2020.

In November 2020, Vorpagel was elected by his colleagues to serve as the Chair of the Majority Caucus.

In April 2022, Vorpagel announced he would not run for a fifth term to the state legislature.

Wisconsin State Assembly
Preceded by Steve Kestell	Member of the Wisconsin State Assembly from the 27th district January 5, 2015 – June 1, 2022	Succeeded by Amy Binsfeld
