= Terry Van Akkeren =

American politician (born 1954)

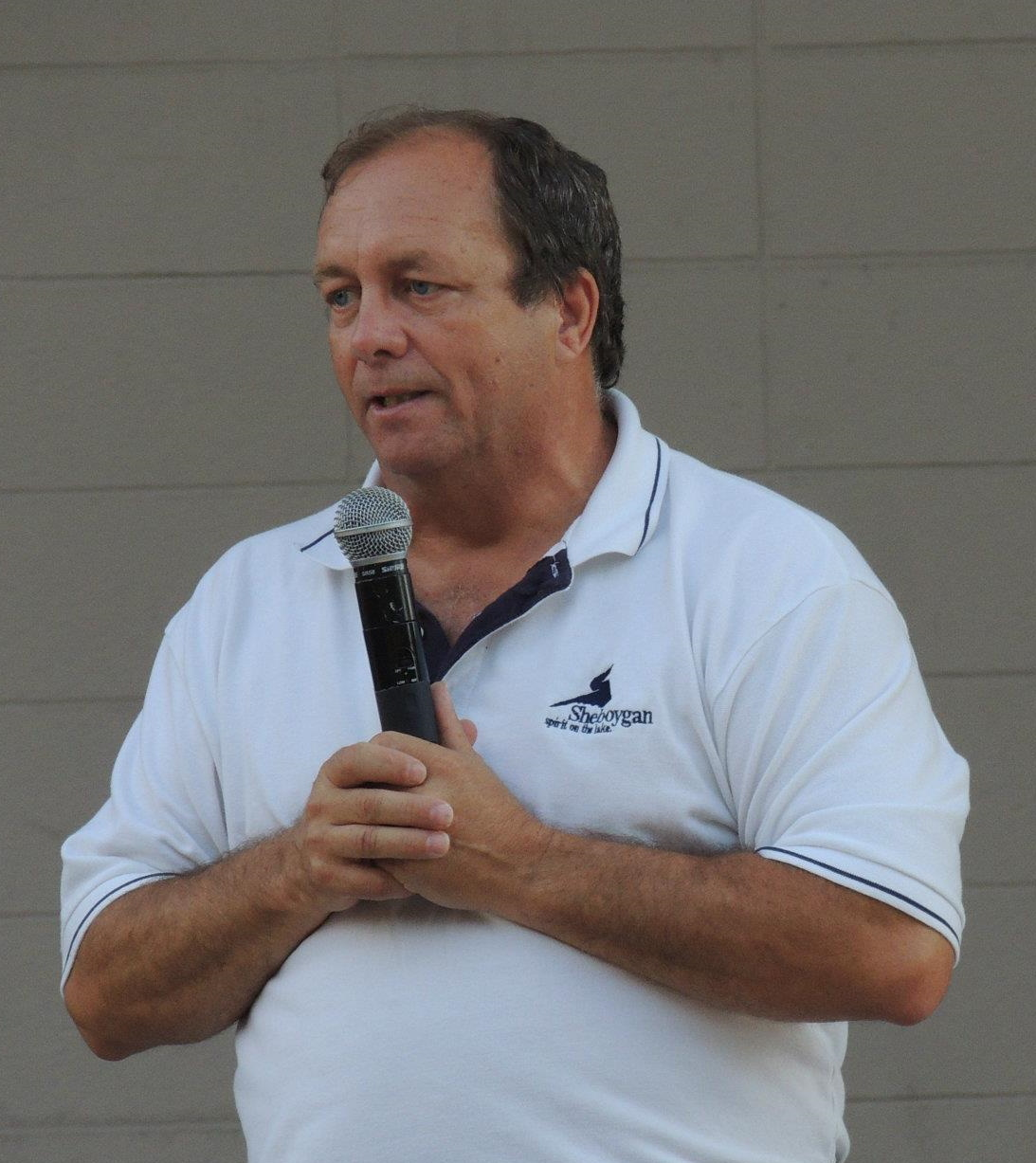

53rd Mayor of Sheboygan, Wisconsin
- In office March 5, 2012 – April 16, 2013
- Preceded by: Bob Ryan
- Succeeded by: Mike Vandersteen

Member of the Wisconsin State Assembly from the 26th district
- In office January 6, 2003 – January 3, 2011
- Preceded by: Joe Leibham
- Succeeded by: Mike Endsley

Personal details
- Born: March 10, 1954 (age 72) Sheboygan, Wisconsin, U.S.
- Party: Democratic
- Spouse: Sue Van Akkeren (div. 2022)
- Children: Beth, Peter, David, and Amy

Terry Van Akkeren (born March 10, 1954) is an American engineering technician, die and tool maker, and Democratic politician from Sheboygan, Wisconsin. He represented Sheboygan for eight years in the Wisconsin State Assembly (2003–2011) and served one year as mayor of Sheboygan after a successful recall of the previous mayor, Bob Ryan.

== Career ==
Van Akkeren graduated from Sheboygan North High School and went to Lakeshore Technical College. He worked as an engineering technician and tool and die maker. He also served on the Sheboygan County Board of Supervisors.

== Elections ==
From 2002 until 2010, Van Akkeren served in the Wisconsin State Assembly, as a Democrat, representing the 26th Assembly District. On November 2, 2010, Van Akkeren was defeated for election by Mike Endsley.

Van Akkeren unsuccessfully ran for Mayor of Sheboygan in 2009. He lost to Alderman Bob Ryan 3,968 votes to 5,891. He ran again in 2012 when a special recall election was called.

On February 21, 2012, Van Akkeren defeated Mayor Bob Ryan in the mayoral recall election. On March 5, 2012, Van Akkeren was sworn in as Mayor of Sheboygan. After serving the remaining months of former Mayor Ryan's four-year term, Van Akkeren lost his reelection bid to Sheboygan County Supervisor Mike Vandersteen by a vote of 4,059 to 3,862. On November 4, 2014, Terry Katsma defeated Van Akkeren for the Wisconsin State Assembly seat.

== See also ==
- List of mayors of Sheboygan, Wisconsin

Wisconsin State Assembly
Preceded by Joe Leibham	Member of the Wisconsin State Assembly from the 26th district 2003-2011	Succeeded by Mike Endsley
