= Clifford Otte =

American politician (1933–2026)

Member of the Wisconsin State Assembly from the 27th district
- In office January 4, 1993 – January 4, 1999
- Preceded by: Wilfrid J. Turba
- Succeeded by: Steve Kestell

Personal details
- Born: January 15, 1933 Wilson, Sheboygan County, Wisconsin, U.S.
- Died: April 11, 2026 (aged 93) Sheboygan, Wisconsin, U.S.
- Party: Republican
- Spouse: Haleta
- Profession: Politician

Clifford Otte (January 15, 1933 – April 11, 2026) was an American politician who was a member of the Wisconsin State Assembly.

== Early life and education ==
Otte was born on January 15, 1933. He graduated from Oostburg High School in Oostburg, Wisconsin, and served in the United States Navy during the Korean War. Otte was also a member of the fire department in the Town of Sheboygan Falls, Wisconsin.

== Political career ==
Otte was first elected to the Assembly in 1992. Additionally, he was a member of the Town of Sheboygan Falls School Board from 1973 to 1984, the Town of Sheboygan Falls Clerk and Supervisor from 1977 to 1984 and a Sheboygan County, Wisconsin, supervisor from 1982 to 1993. He was a Republican.

== Death ==
Otte was married with six children. He died on April 11, 2026, at the age of 93.

Wisconsin State Assembly
Preceded by Wilfrid J. Turba	Member of the Wisconsin State Assembly from the 27th district 1993–1999	Succeeded by Steve Kestell
