= Terry Katsma =

American businessman and legislator

Member of the Wisconsin State Assembly from the 26th district
- In office January 5, 2015 – January 6, 2025
- Preceded by: Mike Endsley
- Succeeded by: Joe Sheehan

Personal details
- Born: April 23, 1958 (age 68) Sheboygan, Wisconsin, U.S.
- Party: Republican
- Children: 3
- Education: Dordt University (BA); Marquette University (MBA)

Terry Katsma (born April 23, 1958) is an American Republican politician and businessman. He served five terms as a member of the Wisconsin State Assembly, representing Wisconsin's 26th Assembly district from 2015 to 2025.

== Early life and education ==
Katsma was born in Sheboygan, Wisconsin. He graduated from Sheboygan County Christian High School. He then received his bachelor's degree in business administration from Dordt College and his master's degree in business administration from Marquette University.

== Business career ==
He worked in the banking business, having served as the senior vice president at Oostburg State Bank and later president and chief executive officer. Katsma had served on the Oostburg Village Board and is a Republican.

== Wisconsin state legislature ==
On November 4, 2014, Katsma was elected to the Wisconsin State Assembly after defeating Democrat Terry Van Akkeren in the general election. He was re-elected to the state legislature in 2016, 2018 2020, and 2022. He retired in 2024

Wisconsin State Assembly
Preceded by Mike Endsley	Member of the Wisconsin State Assembly from the 26th district January 5, 2015 – January 6, 2025	Succeeded by Joe Sheehan
