= Wisconsin's 27th Assembly district =

American legislative district in eastern Wisconsin

Wisconsin's 27th State Assembly district
- 2024 map defined in 2023 Wisc. Act 94; 2022 map defined in Johnson v. Wisconsin Elections Commission; 2011 map was defined in 2011 Wisc. Act 43
Assemblymember
Lindee Brill; R–Sheboygan Falls
since January 6, 2025 (1 years)
- Demographics: 92.71% White; 1.8% Black; 2.66% Hispanic; 1.23% Asian; 1.12% Native American; 0.06% Hawaiian/Pacific Islander
- Population (2020) • Voting age: 60,058; 47,890
- Website: Official website
- Notes: Eastern Wisconsin

The 27th Assembly district of Wisconsin is one of 99 districts in the Wisconsin State Assembly. Located in eastern Wisconsin, the district comprises much of Sheboygan County and parts of southeast Manitowoc County and northeast Fond du Lac County. It includes the cities of Sheboygan Falls, Plymouth, and Kiel, and the villages of Oostburg, Elkhart Lake, Howards Grove, and Kohler. It also contains Lakeland University, the Blackwolf Run golf course, the Road America motorsport course, and the Sheboygan County Memorial Airport. The district is represented by Republican Lindee Brill, since January 2025.

The 27th Assembly district is located within Wisconsin's 9th Senate district, along with the 25th and 26th Assembly districts.

== History ==
The district was created in the 1972 redistricting act (1971 Wisc. Act 304) which first established the numbered district system, replacing the previous system which allocated districts to specific counties. The 27th district was drawn somewhat in line with the boundaries of the previous Milwaukee County 12th district (downtown Milwaukee) with the addition of northern parts of what had been the Milwaukee County 17th district (Port of Milwaukee).

Following the 1982 court-ordered redistricting, which scrambled all State Assembly districts, the 1983 redistricting moved the 27th district to Sheboygan County, comprising the rural towns surrounding the more suburban municipalities of Sheboygan, Kohler, and Sheboygan Falls. The controversial 2011 redistricting plan (2011 Wisc. Act 43) split the city of Sheboygan between the 26th and 27th districts, in order to create two safe Republican districts from what had previously been the competitive 26th and safe Republican 27th. The 2024 redistricting removed all of Sheboygan back to the 26th district and the 27th district reverted to a more expansive rural district.

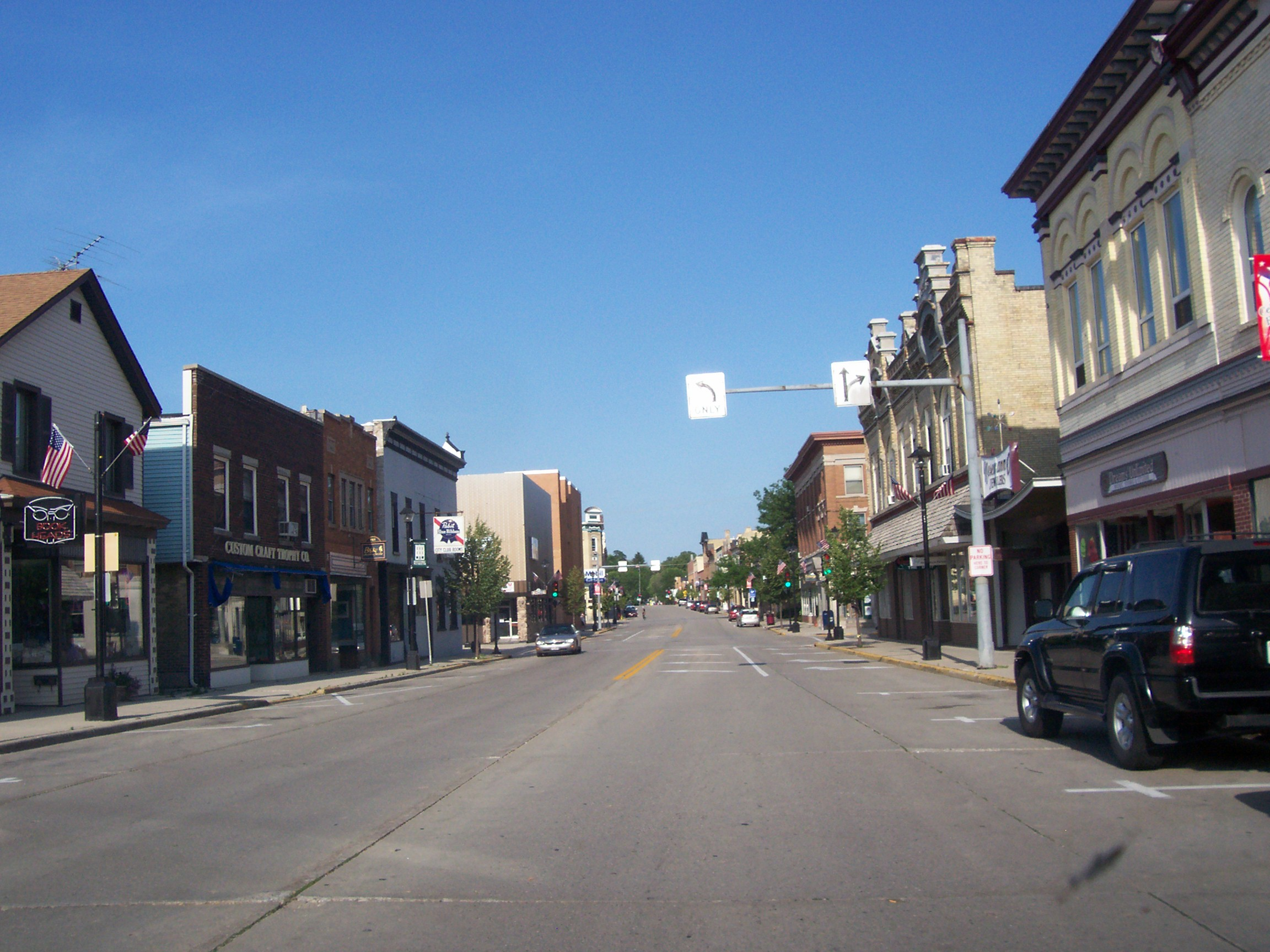
City of Plymouth

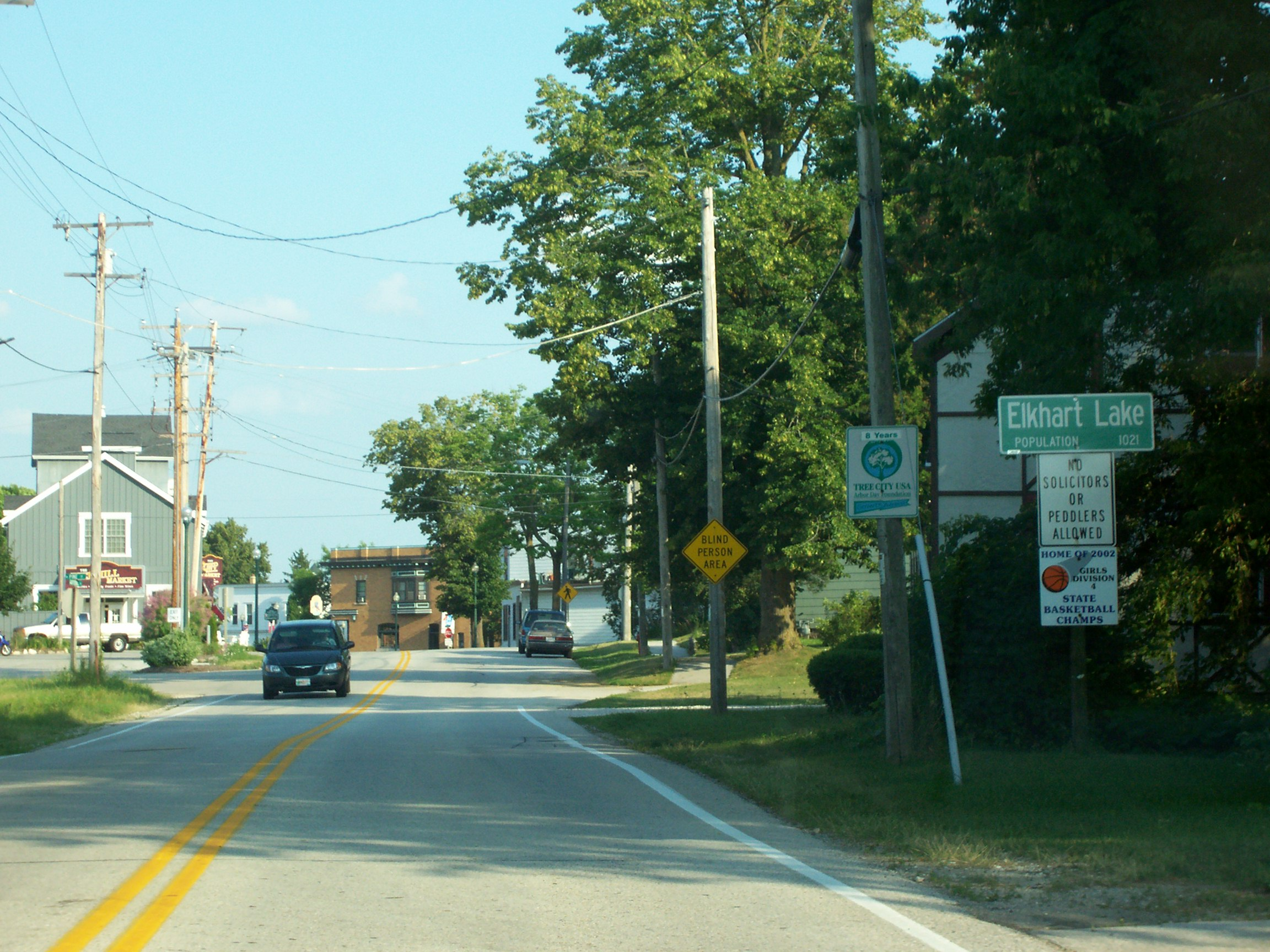
Village of Elkhart Lake

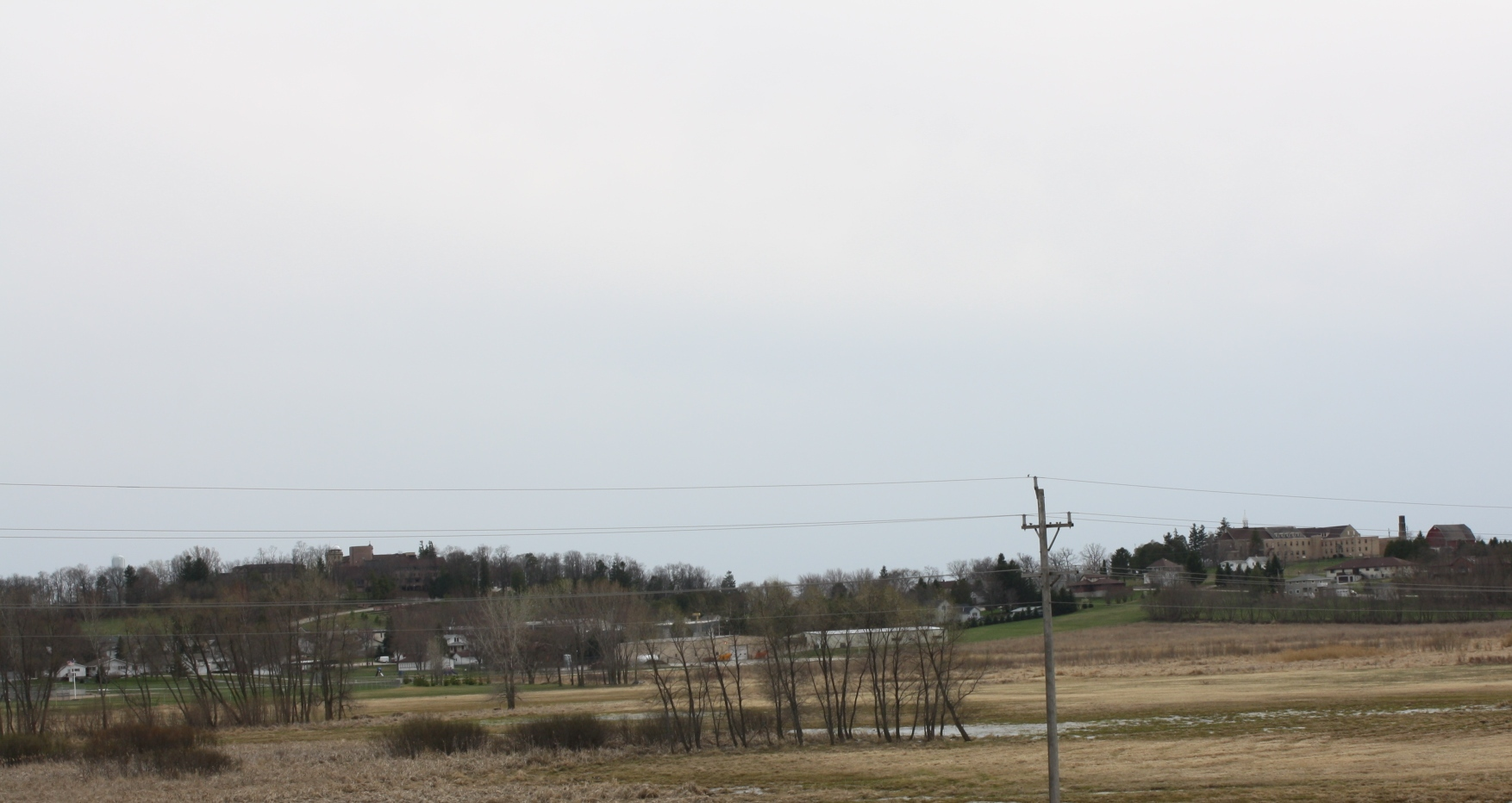
Mount Calvary

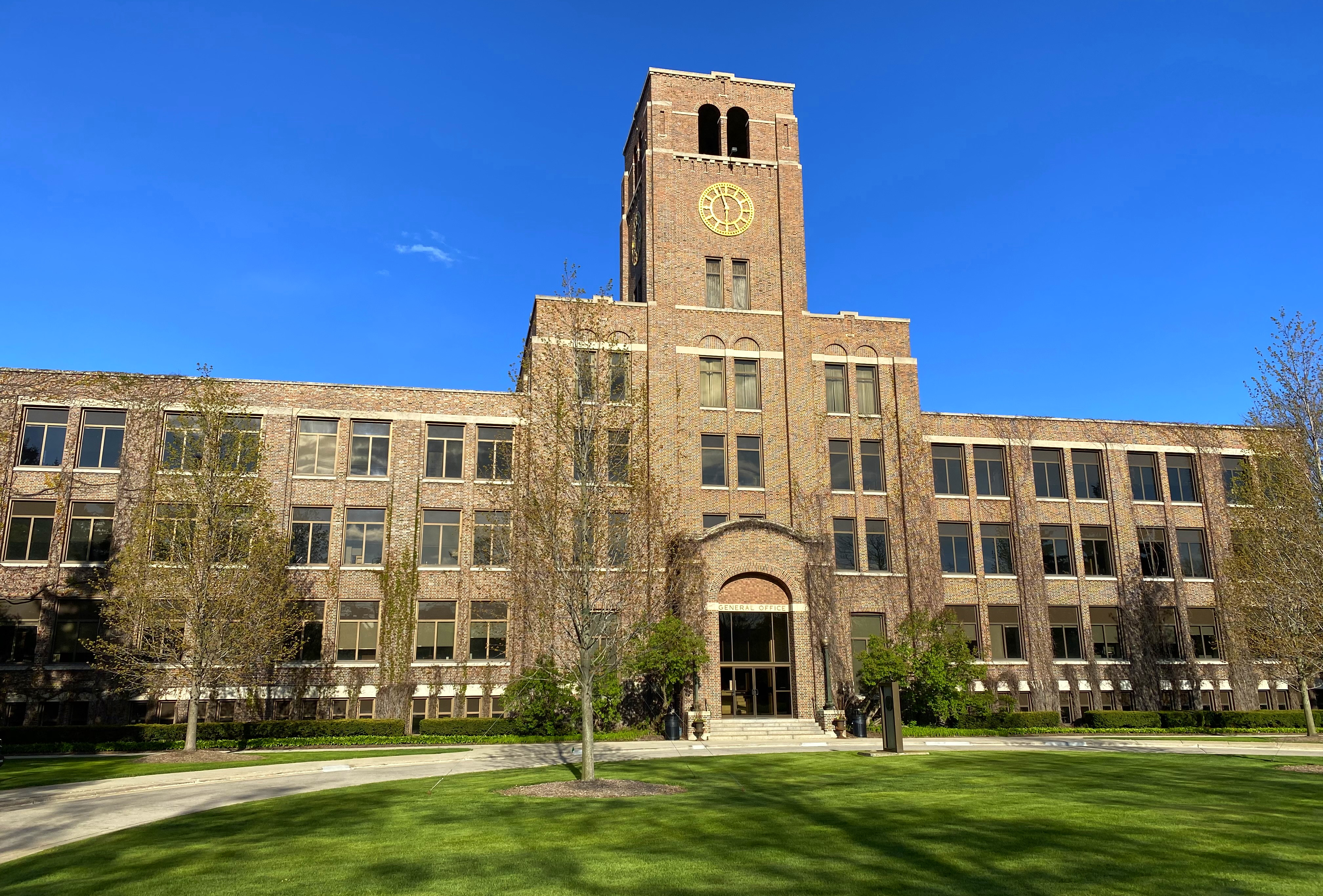
Kohler Co. main office

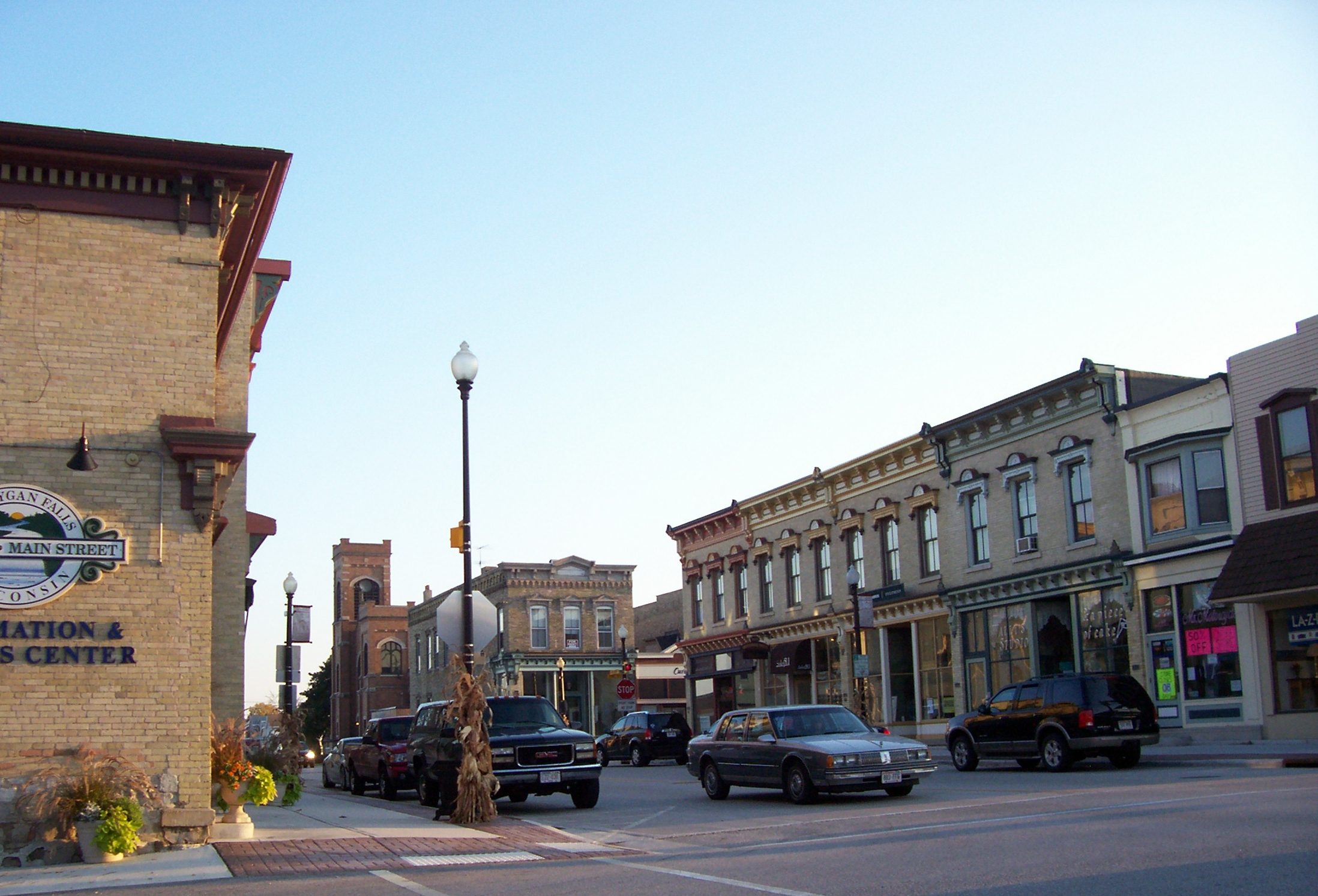
downtown Sheboygan Falls

== List of past representatives ==
List of representatives to the Wisconsin State Assembly from the 27th district
Member	Party	Residence	Counties represented	Term start	Term end	Ref.
District created
Joseph Czerwinski	Dem.	Milwaukee	Milwaukee	January 1, 1973	January 5, 1981	
Walter Kunicki	Dem.	Milwaukee	Milwaukee	January 5, 1981	January 3, 1983	
Charles W. Coleman	Rep.	Richmond	Walworth	January 3, 1983	January 7, 1985	
Wilfrid J. Turba	Rep.	Elkhart Lake	Calumet, Sheboygan	January 7, 1985	January 4, 1993	
Clifford Otte	Rep.	Sheboygan Falls	Calumet, Sheboygan	January 4, 1993	January 4, 1999	
Steve Kestell	Rep.	Elkhart Lake	Calumet, Fond du Lac, Manitowoc, Sheboygan	January 4, 1999	January 5, 2015	
Tyler Vorpagel	Rep.	Plymouth	Manitowoc, Sheboygan	January 5, 2015	June 1, 2022	
--Vacant--			Manitowoc, Sheboygan	June 1, 2022	January 3, 2023	
Amy Binsfeld	Rep.	Mosel	Manitowoc, Sheboygan	January 3, 2023	January 6, 2025	
Lindee Brill	Rep.	Sheboygan Falls	Fond du Lac, Manitowoc, Sheboygan	January 6, 2025	Current	
