= Bill B. Bruhy =

American politician (1916-1977)

Bill B. Bruhy (July 16, 1916 – July 15, 1977) was an American politician and telephone company executive.

Born in West Bend, Wisconsin, Bruhy went to school in Plymouth, Wisconsin and to Ripon College, in Ripon, Wisconsin. Bruhy served in the United States Army during World War II. He worked as an outside plant manager for General Telephone. Bruhy served in the Wisconsin State Assembly in 1973 and was a Republican. Bruhy also served as mayor of Plymouth from 1966 until his death in 1977. Bruhy died of cancer in Plymouth, Wisconsin.
