= Mike Endsley =

American politician (1962–2023)

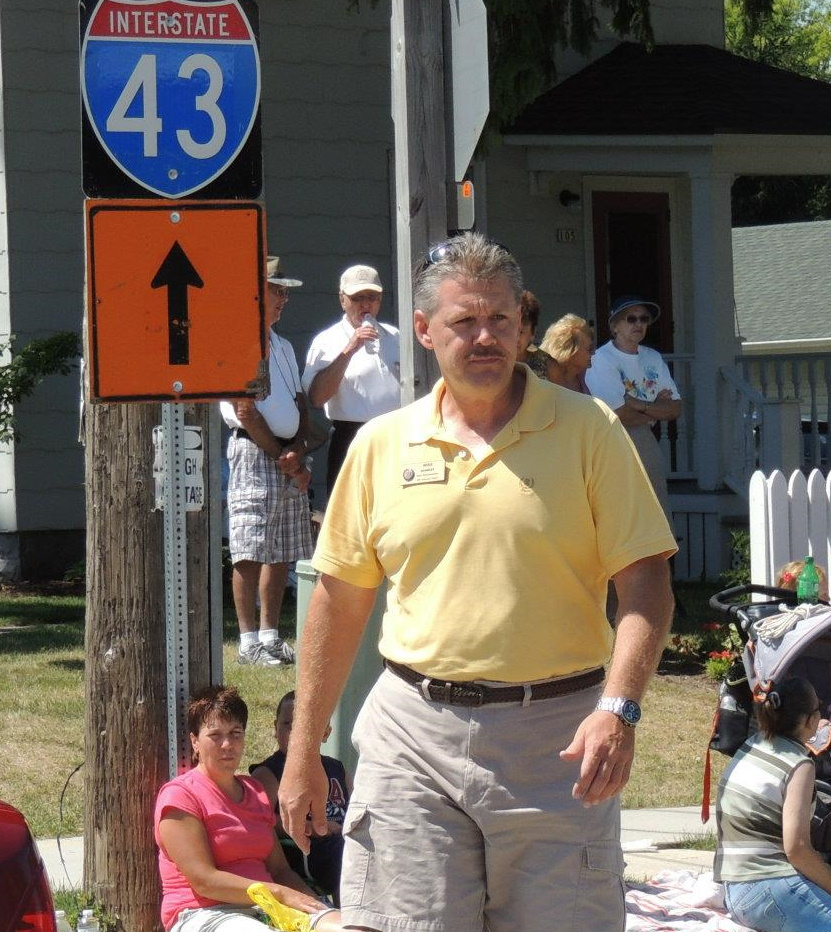
- Endsley in 2013

Member of the Wisconsin State Assembly from the 26th district
- In office January 3, 2011 – January 5, 2015
- Preceded by: Terry Van Akkeren
- Succeeded by: Terry Katsma

Personal details
- Born: March 4, 1962 Sheboygan Falls, Wisconsin, U.S.
- Died: July 13, 2023 (aged 61)
- Party: Republican
- Education: UW-Platteville
- Profession: Politician

Michael Dee Endsley (March 4, 1962 – July 13, 2023) was an American Republican politician and legislator in the state of Wisconsin.

== Early life and education ==
Michael Dee Endsley was born in Sheboygan Falls, Wisconsin, on March 4, 1962. He graduated with a BS in Psychology from the University of Wisconsin–Platteville in 1984.

== Wisconsin State Legislature ==
Endsley was elected to the Wisconsin State Assembly in 2010 but left after two terms due to early-onset Alzheimer's disease.

Endsley described himself as a pro-life social conservative.

== Personal life and death ==
Endsley was diagnosed with Alzheimer's disease in 2014. He died on July 13, 2023, at the age of 61.

Wisconsin State Assembly
Preceded by Terry Van Akkeren	Member of the Wisconsin State Assembly from the 26th district January 3, 2011 – January 5, 2015	Succeeded by Terry Katsma
