= Lakeshore College =

Community college in Cleveland, Wisconsin, US

Coordinates: 43.9243°N 87.7525°W

- Logo used as Lakeshore Technical College
- Former names: Lakeshore Technical Institute (1967–1888); Lakeshore Technical College (1988–2024)
- Motto: "A Comprehensive Community and Technical College"
- Type: Public community college
- Established: 1967
- President: Paul Carlsen
- Location: Cleveland, Wisconsin
- Colors: Dark blue, navy blue, and white
- Nickname: Snow Leopards
- Mascot: Lenny the Snow Leopard
- Website: lakeshore.edu

Lakeshore College is a public community college in Cleveland, Wisconsin. It is part of the Wisconsin Technical College System. The college offers associate degree and technical diploma programs as well as certifications and adult continuing education programs.

== History ==
In 1960, the former Sheboygan Central High School was renovated and the building was converted to house Sheboygan Vocational and Adult Education and the administrative offices of the Sheboygan Area School District.

In 1968, the Sheboygan School of Vocational and Adult Education was renamed to Lakeshore Technical Institute (LTI). In 1974, LTI's main campus in Cleveland opened, constructed at a cost of $5 million.

In 1978, student housing was first proposed at the Cleveland campus. In 1981, LTI's board of directors decided against being directly involved in student housing but in March 1990, the board endorsed a proposal to develop housing on a five-acre property just south of the campus along North Avenue.

In 1988, LTI changed its name to Lakeshore Technical College (LTC) to reflect a shift in course offerings.

In 2022, LTC began offering Associate of Arts and Associate of Science degrees, the first non-technical degrees to be offered at the college. In 2024, the board of trustees voted to change the college's name from Lakeshore Technical College to Lakeshore College.

== Images ==
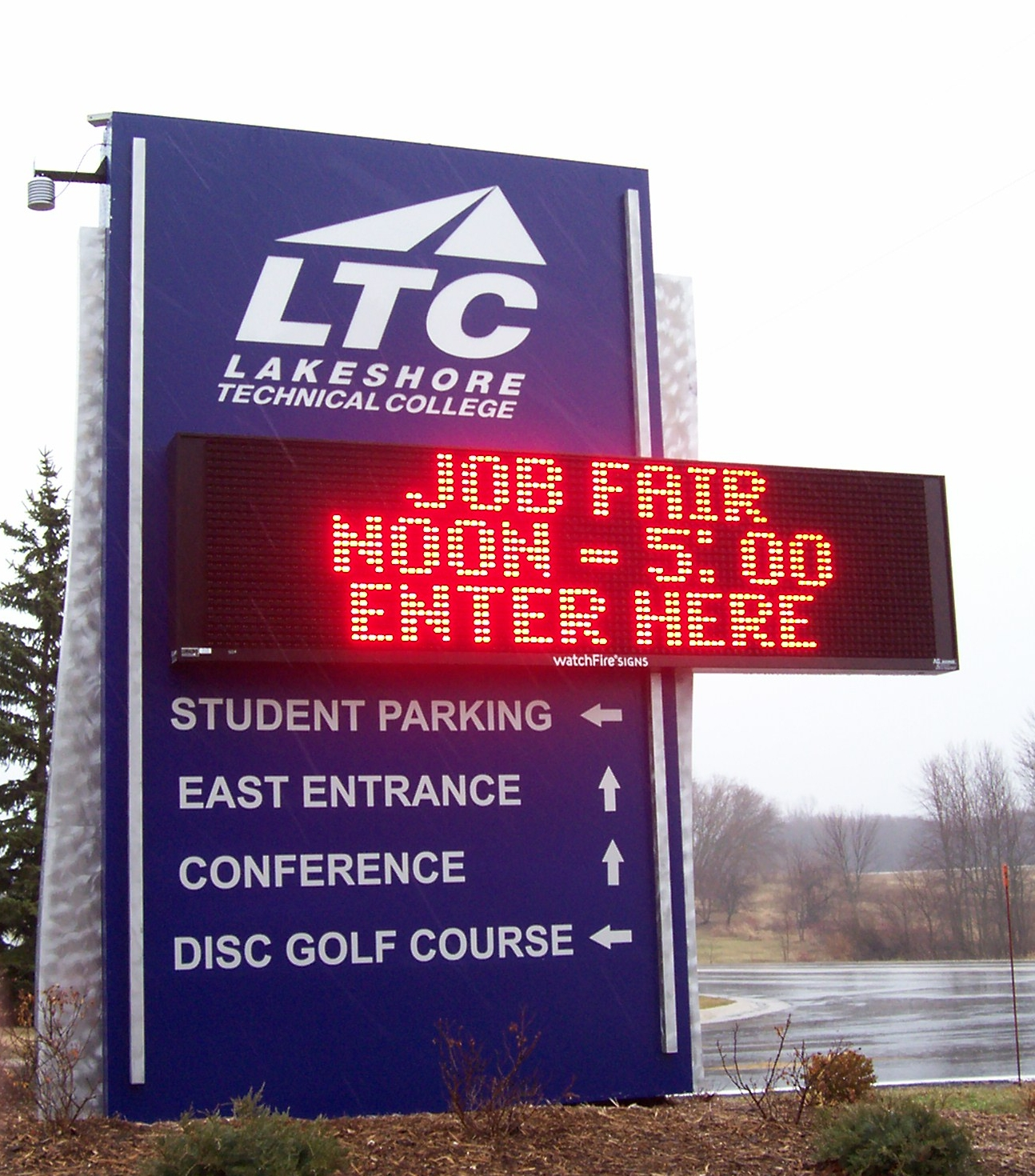
Former Welcome sign

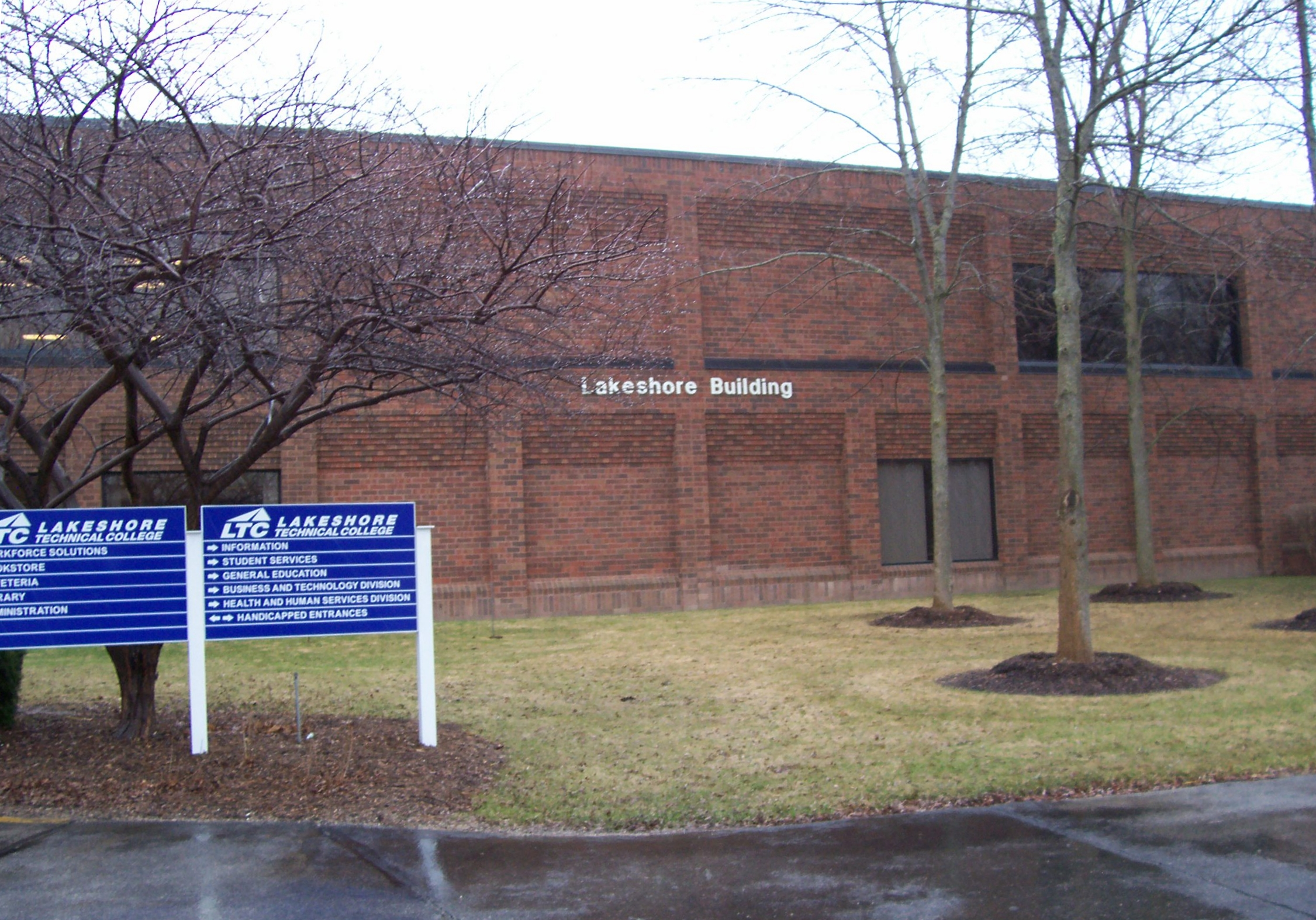
Lakeshore Building on Cleveland campus

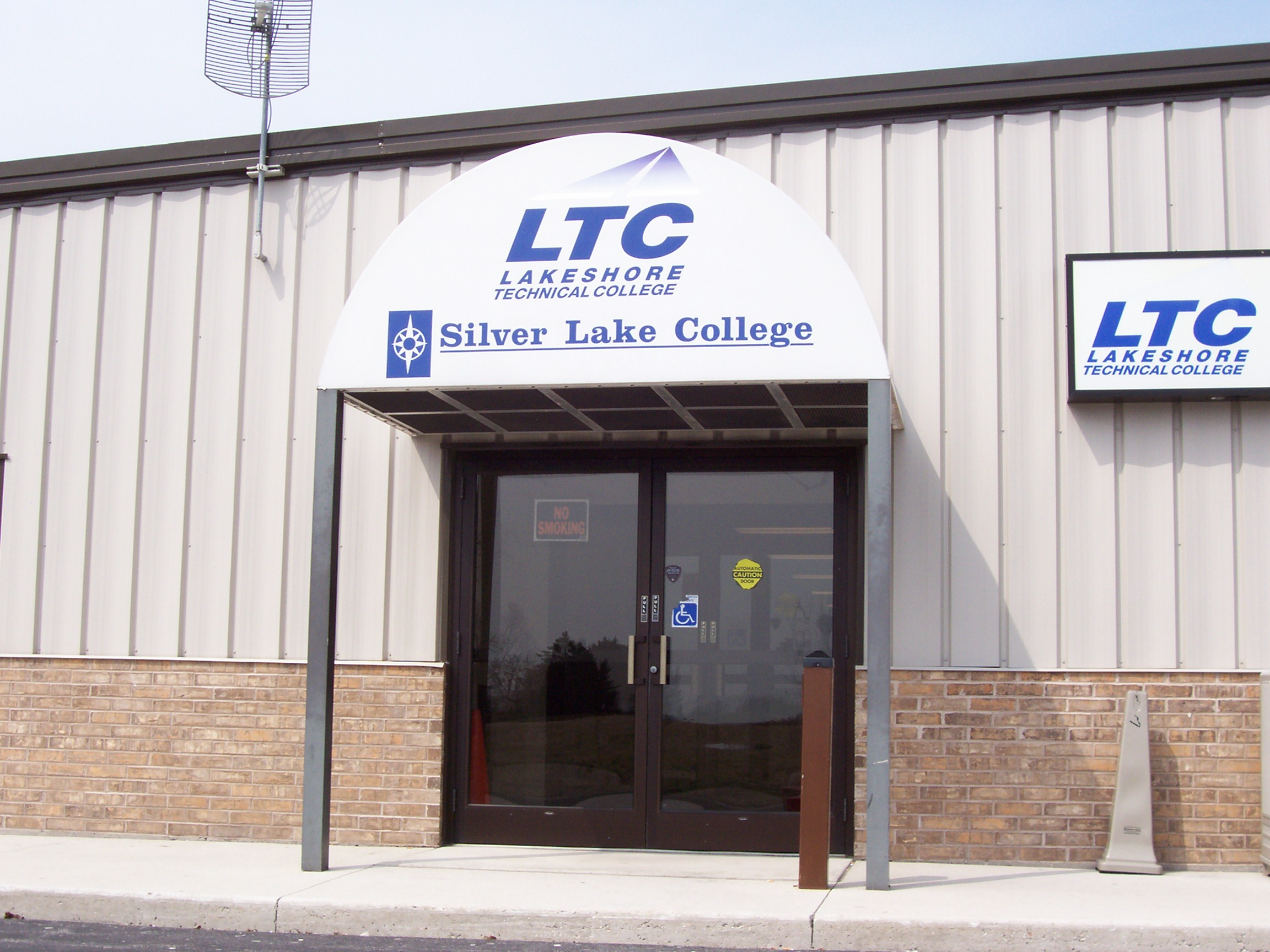
Former Sheboygan campus entrance (moved to a new location in August 2019)

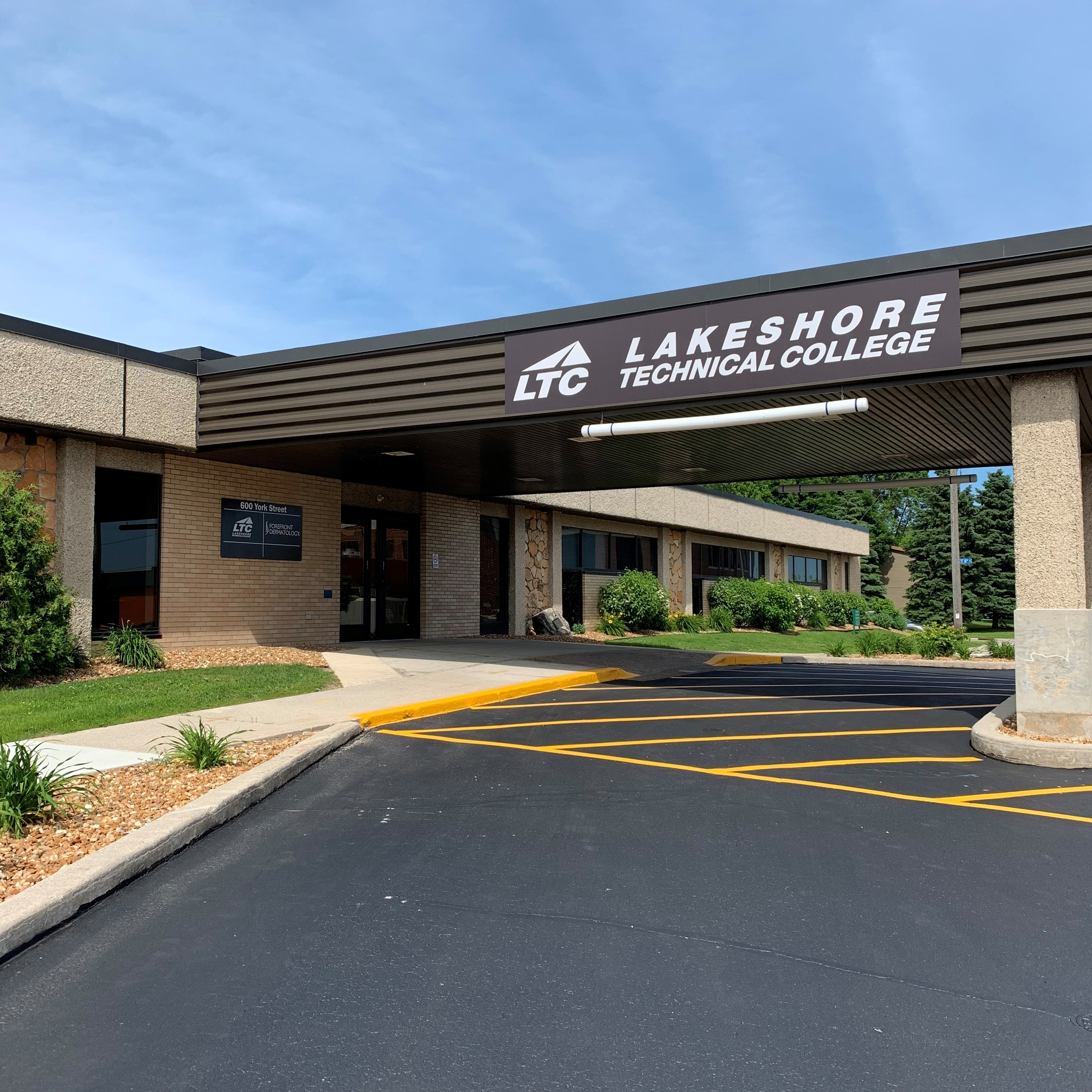
Former LTC Manitowoc campus

== Notable alumni ==
- Trevor Casper, Wisconsin State Trooper
- Terry Van Akkeren, former mayor of Sheboygan and former member of the Wisconsin State Assembly
