= Wisconsin's 26th Assembly district =

American legislative district for Sheboygan, Wisconsin

Wisconsin's 26th State Assembly district
- 2024 map defined in 2023 Wisc. Act 94; 2022 map defined in Johnson v. Wisconsin Elections Commission; 2011 map was defined in 2011 Wisc. Act 43
Assemblymember
Joe Sheehan; D–Sheboygan
since January 6, 2025 (1 years)
- Demographics: 77.36% White; 2.94% Black; 8.85% Hispanic; 8.82% Asian; 1.83% Native American; 0.16% Hawaiian/Pacific Islander
- Population (2020) • Voting age: 59,217; 45,459
- Website: Official website
- Notes: Eastern Wisconsin

The 26th Assembly district of Wisconsin is one of 99 districts in the Wisconsin State Assembly. Located in eastern Wisconsin, the district comprises part of eastern Sheboygan County, including the city of Sheboygan. It also contains the University of Wisconsin–Green Bay, Sheboygan Campus and Kohler-Andrae State Park. The district is represented by Democrat Joe Sheehan, since January 2025.

The 26th Assembly district is located within Wisconsin's 9th Senate district, along with the 25th and 27th Assembly districts.

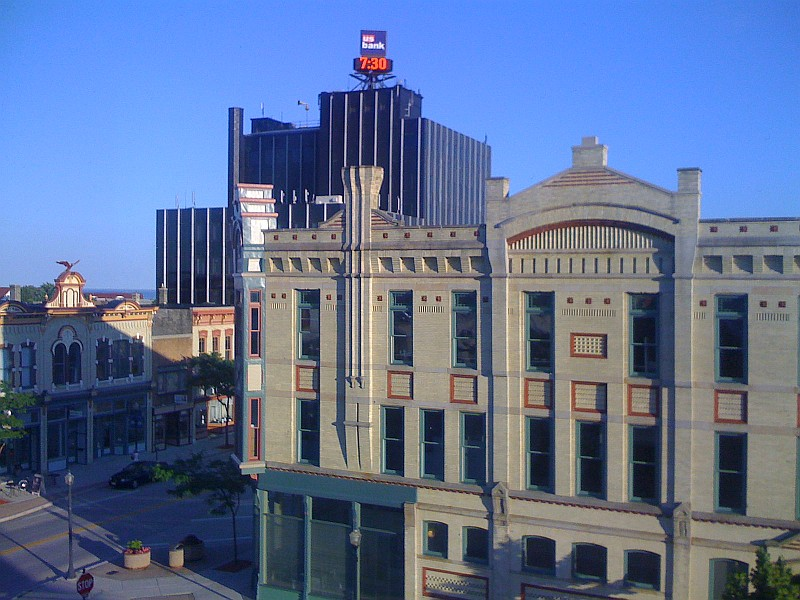
Downtown Sheboygan, Wisconsin

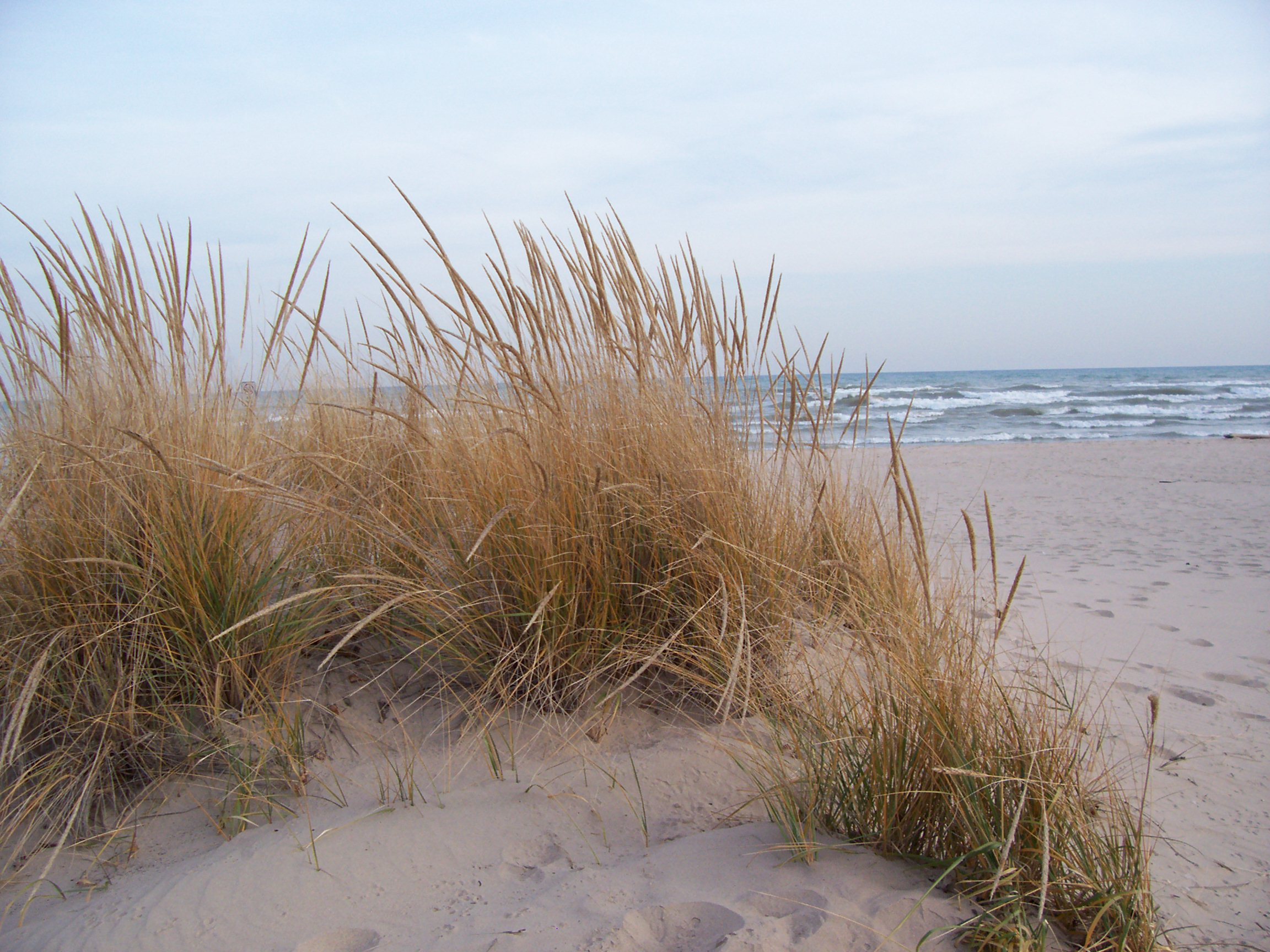
American Marram Grass dunes with Lake Michigan in background within Kohler-Andrae State Park

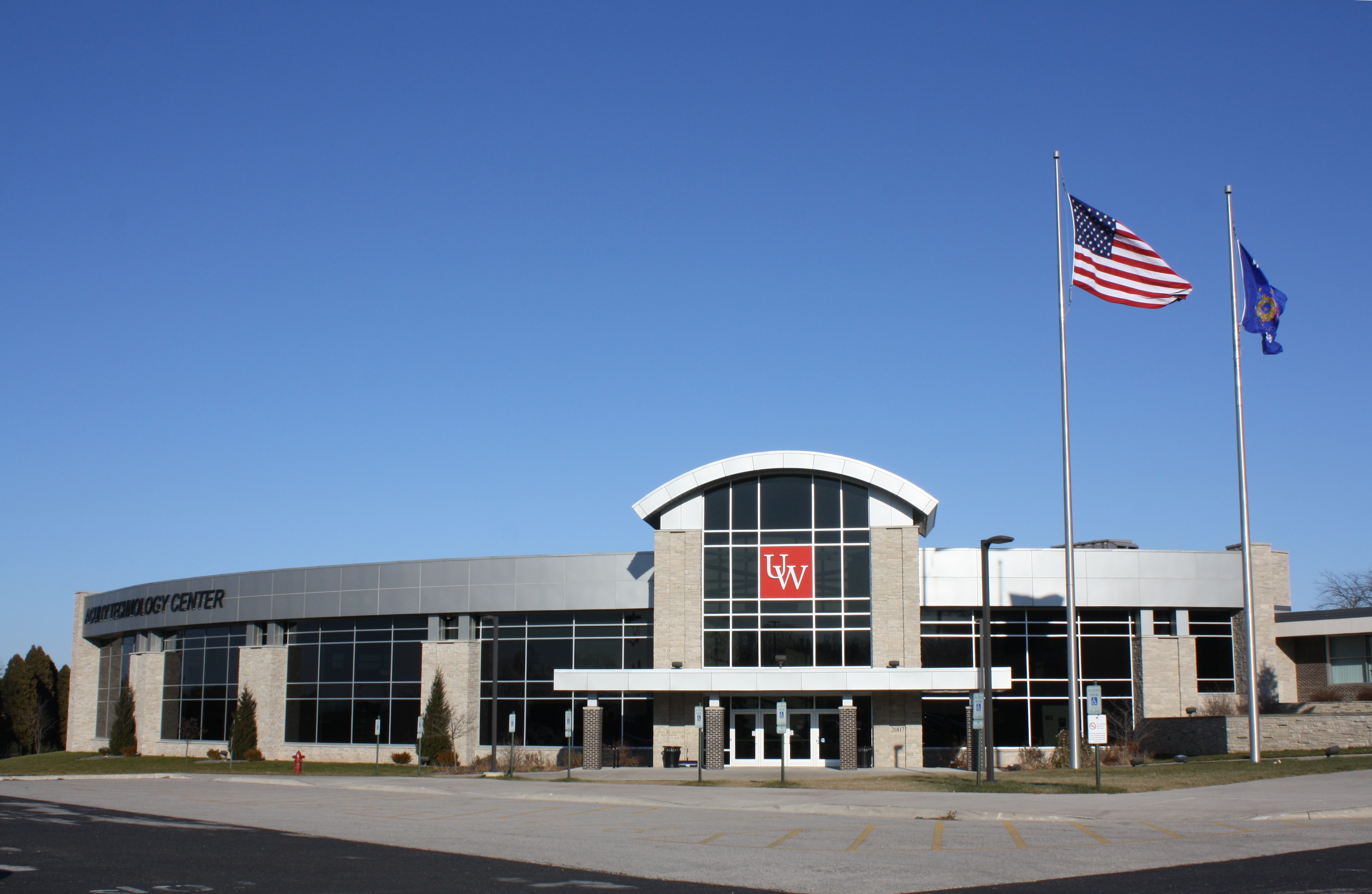
University of Wisconsin–Green Bay, Sheboygan Campus

== History ==
The district was created in the 1972 redistricting act (1971 Wisc. Act 304) which first established the numbered district system, replacing the previous system which allocated districts to specific counties. The 26th district was drawn roughly in line with the boundaries of the previous Milwaukee County 4th district (downtown Milwaukee).

Following the 1982 court-ordered redistricting, which scrambled all State Assembly districts, the 1983 redistricting moved the 26th district to Sheboygan County, based in the city of Sheboygan. The boundaries remained mostly consistent since 1984. The controversial 2011 redistricting plan (2011 Wisc. Act 43) split the city of Sheboygan between the 26th and 27th districts, keeping just the southern half in the 26th district and adding number of rural towns, in order to create two safe Republican districts from what had previously been the competitive 26th and safe Republican 27th. The 2024 redistricting restored all of Sheboygan to the 26th district.

== List of past representatives ==
List of representatives to the Wisconsin State Assembly from the 26th district
Member	Party	Residence	Counties represented	Term start	Term end	Ref.
District created
Harout O. Sanasarian	Dem.	Milwaukee	Milwaukee	January 1, 1973	January 3, 1977	
Stephen R. Leopold	Dem.	Milwaukee	Milwaukee	January 3, 1977	January 3, 1983	
Wayne W. Wood	Dem.	Janesville	Rock	January 3, 1983	January 7, 1985	
Calvin Potter	Dem.	Kohler	Sheboygan	January 7, 1985	January 7, 1991	
James Baumgart	Dem.	Sheboygan	Sheboygan	January 7, 1991	January 4, 1999	
Joe Leibham	Rep.	Sheboygan	Sheboygan	January 4, 1999	January 6, 2003	
Terry Van Akkeren	Dem.	Sheboygan	Sheboygan	January 6, 2003	January 3, 2011	
Mike Endsley	Rep.	Sheboygan	Sheboygan	January 3, 2011	January 5, 2015	
Terry Katsma	Rep.	Oostburg	Sheboygan	January 5, 2015	January 6, 2025	
Joe Sheehan	Dem.	Sheboygan	Sheboygan	January 6, 2025	Current	
