= 2026 Wisconsin State Assembly election =

American state election

- November 3, 2026

All 99 seats in the Wisconsin State Assembly 50 seats needed for a majority
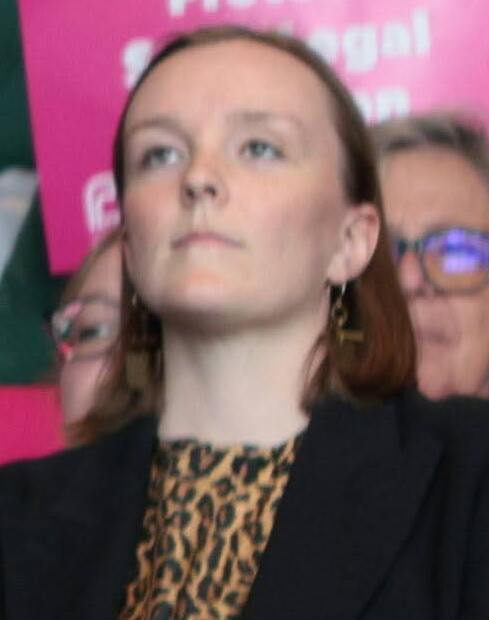

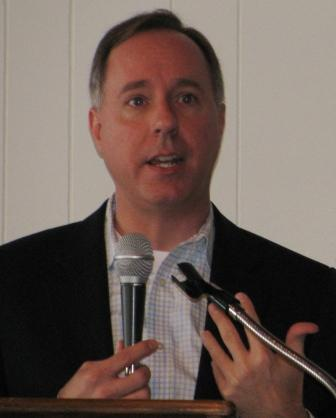
	Majority party	Minority party
Leader	Greta Neubauer	Robin Vos (retired)
Party	Democratic	Republican
Leader since	January 10, 2022	January 7, 2013
Leader's seat	66th–Racine	33rd–Rochester
Last election	45 seats, 48.74%	54 seats, 50.58%
Seats before	45	54
Seats won	53	46
Seat change	▲8	▼8
- Results by district: Democratic hold Democratic gain Republican hold
Speaker before election
Robin Vos
Republican
Elected Speaker
Greta Neubauer
Democratic

The 2026 Wisconsin State Assembly election was held on Tuesday, November 3, 2026. All 99 seats in the Wisconsin State Assembly were up for election. The primary election was held on August 11, 2026. Prior to the election, 54 seats were held by Republicans and 45 were held by Democrats.

Democrats flipped eight seats from Republican control in this election and achieved an Assembly majority. This will be the first Democratic Party majority in the state Assembly since the 99th Wisconsin Legislature (2009–2010). Democrats are projected to enter the 108th Wisconsin Legislature with 53 of 99 seats.

== Background ==
=== Partisan background ===
In the 2024 US Presidential Election, Donald Trump won 50 districts, while Kamala Harris won 49. Republicans represent five districts where Harris had won in 2024, while one Democrat represents a district which voted for Donald Trump:

- District 21 (Harris +4.05%), represented by Jessie Rodriguez
- District 51 (Harris +3.49%), represented by Todd Novak
- District 53 (Harris +4.35%), represented by Dean Kaufert
- District 61 (Harris +2.20%), represented by Bob Donovan
- District 88 (Harris +0.35%), represented by Ben Franklin
- District 94 (Trump +2.15%), represented by Steve Doyle

Harris 40–50% 50–60% 60–70% 70–80% 80–90% / Trump 40–50% 50–60% 60–70% 70–80%

=== Background ===
Following redistricting as a result of the Wisconsin Supreme Court's decision in Clarke v. Wisconsin Elections Commission, the 2024 Wisconsin State Assembly election saw the Democrats gain 10 seats, putting them at 45 seats to the Republicans' 54. The Democratic Party had also gained 4 seats in the simultaneous state senate election.

== Predictions ==
=== Statewide ===
Source	Ranking	As of
Marquette University Law	Tossup	July 20, 2026
Sabato's Crystal Ball	Tossup	January 22, 2026
State Navigate	Lean D (flip)	September 22, 2026

=== Competitive districts ===
District	Incumbent	Previous result	Marquette July 20, 2026	State Navigate (Note: Ratings simplified from percentages: <60% = "Tilt"; 60–75% = "Lean"; 75–95% = "Likely"; >95% = "Safe") Nov. 2, 2026
15th	Adam Neylon	59.07% R	Safe R	Likely R
21st	Jessie Rodriguez (retiring)	51.27% R	Lean D (flip)	Likely D (flip)
22nd	Paul Melotik	58.00% R	Safe R	Likely R
24th	Dan Knodl	59.94% R	Safe R	Likely R
26th	Joe Sheehan	51.35% D	Safe D	Likely D
30th	Shannon Zimmerman	54.21% R	Lean R	Tilt R
51st	Todd Novak	51.66% R	Tossup	Tilt D (flip)
53rd	Dean Kaufert (retiring)	50.51% R	Lean D (flip)	Likely D (flip)
60th	Jerry L. O'Connor (retiring)	60.11% R	Safe R	Likely R
61st	Bob Donovan	51.54% R	Tossup	Lean D (flip)
82nd	Scott Allen (retiring)	57.18% R	Safe R	Likely R
85th	Patrick Snyder	53.17% R	Lean R	Lean D (flip)
88th	Ben Franklin	50.29% R	Tossup	Likely D (flip)
89th	Ryan Spaude	51.32% D	Safe D	Likely D
92nd	Clint Moses	53.25% R	Lean R	Tilt D (flip)
94th	Steve Doyle	50.29% D	Lean D	Likely D
Overall			Rep – 49; Dem – 47; 3 Tossups	Dem – 52; Rep – 47

== Summary ==
		Party (majority caucus shading)		Total
		Democratic	Republican	Total
Last election (2024)		35	64	99
Total after last election (2024)		45	54	99
Total before this election		45	54	99
Up for election		45	54	99
of which:	Incumbent retiring	3	9	12
of which:	Open	3	9	12
of which:	Vacated	0	0	0
of which:	Unopposed	2	5	7
This election		53	46	99
Change from last election		▲8	▼8	
Total after this election		53	46	99
Change in total		▲8	▼8	

=== Close results ===
Seats where the margin of victory was under 10%:

- State Assembly district 82, 2.4%
- State Assembly district 30, 6.0% (gain)
- State Assembly district 22, 6.2%
- State Assembly district 92, 6.8% (gain)
- State Assembly district 63, 7.0%
- State Assembly district 24, 8.2%
- State Assembly district 85, 8.2% (gain)
- State Assembly district 88, 8.6% (gain)
- State Assembly district 15, 9.8%
- State Assembly district 25, 10.0%

Seats where the margin of victory was between 10-15%:

- State Assembly district 51, 10.9% (gain)
- State Assembly district 55, 11.4%
- State Assembly district 5, 12.2%
- State Assembly district 61, 12.4% (gain)
- State Assembly district 89, 13.0%
- State Assembly district 60, 13.2%
- State Assembly district 94, 13.4%
- State Assembly district 49, 13.6%
- State Assembly district 1, 14.8%

== Outgoing incumbents ==
Map of the incumbents: Republican incumbent Republican incumbent retiring Democratic incumbent Democratic incumbent retiring

=== Retirements ===
- Scott Allen (R–Waukesha), representing district 82 since 2025, (Note: Previously represented the 97th district from 2015–2025) retired.
- Robert Brooks (R–Saukville), representing district 59 since 2025, (Note: Previously represented the 60th district from 2015–2025) retired.
- Rick Gundrum (R–Slinger), representing district 58 since 2018, retired.
- Dean Kaufert (R-Neenah), representing district 53 since 2025, (Note: Previously represented the 55th district from 1991–2013.) retired.
- Dave Murphy (R–Hortonville), representing district 56 since 2013, retired.
- Jerry L. O'Connor (R–Fond du Lac), representing district 60 since 2025, (Note: Previously represented the 52nd district in 2023–2025) retired.
- Kevin David Petersen (R–Waupaca), representing district 57 since 2025, (Note: Previously represented the 40th district from 2007–2025.) retired.
- Jessie Rodriguez (R–Oak Creek), representing district 21 since 2013 retired.
- Robin Vos (R–Rochester), representing district 33 since 2025, (Note: Previously represented the 63rd district from 2005–2025.) retired.

=== Seeking other office ===
- Francesca Hong (D–Madison), representing district 76 since 2021, retired to run for governor
- Jenna Jacobson (D–Oregon), representing district 50 since 2025, (Note: Previously represented the 43rd district from 2023–2025) retired to run for Senate in the 17th district.
- Robyn Vining (D–Wauwatosa), representing district 13 since 2025, (Note: Previously represented the 14th district from 2019–2025) retired to run for Senate in 5th district

=== Lost renomination ===
- Sylvia Ortiz-Velez (D–Milwaukee), representing district 8 since 2021, lost renomination to Ismael Luna (D–Milwaukee)

=== Lost re-election ===
- Shannon Zimmerman (R–River Falls), representing district 30 since 2017, lost reelection to Kevin Knoke (D–Hudson)
- Todd Novak (R–Dodgeville), representing district 51 since 2015, lost reelection to Ben Gruber (D–Arena)
- Bob Donovan (R–Greenfield), representing district 61 since 2025, (Note: Previously represented the 84th district from 2023–2025.) lost reelection to Ben Brist (D–Greendale)
- Patrick Snyder (R–Weston), representing district 85 since 2017, lost reelection to John Kroll (D–Wausau)
- Ben Franklin (R–De Pere), representing district 88 since 2025, lost reelection to Brandy Tollefson (D–De Pere)
- Clint Moses (R–Menomonie), representing district 92 since 2025, (Note: Previously represented the 29th district from 2021–2025.) lost reelection to Jeremiah Fredrickson (D–Elk Mound)

== Incumbents and candidates ==
District	2024 Pres.	Incumbent				This race
District	2024 Pres.	Member	Party	First elected	Status	Candidates
01	R+14.8	Joel Kitchens	Republican	2014	Incumbent re-elected.	▌ ✓ Joel Kitchens (Rep.); ▌Renee Paplham (Dem.)
02	R+23.5	Shae Sortwell	Republican	2018	Incumbent re-elected.	▌ ✓ Shae Sortwell (Rep.); ▌Alicia Saunders (Dem.)
03	R+22.9	Ron Tusler	Republican	2016	Incumbent re-elected.	▌ ✓ Ron Tusler (Rep.); ▌Michael J. Goodwin (Dem.)
04	R+29	David Steffen	Republican	2014	Incumbent re-elected.	▌ ✓ David Steffen (Rep.); ▌Alexia Unertl (Dem.)
05	R+21.2	Joy Goeben	Republican	2022	Incumbent re-elected.	▌ ✓ Joy Goeben (Rep.); ▌Justin Schumacher (Dem.); ▌David Schupbach (Grn.)
06	R+32.2	Elijah Behnke	Republican	2021 (special)	Incumbent re-elected.	▌ ✓ Elijah Behnke (Rep.); ▌Shirley Hinze (Dem.)
07	D+14.5	Karen Kirsch	Democratic	2024	Incumbent re-elected.	▌ ✓ Karen Kirsch (Dem.); ▌Lee Whiting (Rep.)
08	D+46.3	Sylvia Ortiz-Velez	Democratic	2020	Incumbent lost renomination. New member elected. Democratic hold.	▌ ✓ Ismael Luna (Dem.); ▌Angel Sanchez (Rep.)
09	D+33.7	Priscilla Prado	Democratic	2024	Incumbent re-elected.	▌ ✓ Priscilla Prado (Dem.); ▌Samuel Guerreo (Rep.)
10	D+69.3	Darrin Madison	Democratic	2022	Incumbent re-elected.	▌ ✓ Darrin Madison (Dem.); ▌Robert Longwell-Grice (Grn.)
11	D+75.2	Sequanna Taylor	Democratic	2024	Incumbent re-elected.	▌ ✓ Sequanna Taylor (Dem.); ▌Shandowlyon Reaves (Rep.)
12	D+59.6	Russell Goodwin	Democratic	2024	Incumbent re-elected.	▌ ✓ Russell Goodwin (Dem.)
13	D+20.5	Robyn Vining	Democratic	2018	Incumbent retired to run for state senate. New member elected. Democratic hold.	▌ ✓ Amy Zimmerman (Dem.); ▌Mike Morgan (Rep.)
14	D+10.1	Angelito Tenorio	Democratic	2024	Incumbent re-elected.	▌ ✓ Angelito Tenorio (Dem.); ▌AmyRose Murphy (Rep.)
15	R+12.4	Adam Neylon	Republican	2013 (special)	Incumbent re-elected.	▌ ✓ Adam Neylon (Rep.); ▌Stephen Tryon (Dem.)
16	D+71.5	Kalan Haywood	Democratic	2018	Incumbent re-elected.	▌ ✓ Kalan Haywood (Dem.); ▌Alciro Deacon (Rep.)
17	D+67.6	Supreme Moore Omokunde	Democratic	2020	Incumbent re-elected.	▌ ✓ Supreme Moore Omokunde (Dem.); ▌Charlene Abughrin (Rep.)
18	D+66.3	Margaret Arney	Democratic	2024	Incumbent re-elected.	▌ ✓ Margaret Arney (Dem.); ▌Joel Richmond (Rep.)
19	D+59.8	Ryan Clancy	Democratic	2022	Incumbent re-elected.	▌ ✓ Ryan Clancy (Dem.); ▌Yasmine B. Outlaw (Rep.)
20	D+18.8	Christine Sinicki	Democratic	1998	Incumbent re-elected.	▌ ✓ Christine Sinicki (Dem.); ▌Kyle Cleary (Rep.)
21	D+4.1	Jessie Rodriguez	Republican	2013 (special)	Incumbent retired. New member elected. Democratic gain.	▌ ✓ Dan J. Bukiewicz (Dem.); ▌Dylan Pfaffenbach (Rep.)
22	R+9.8	Paul Melotik	Republican	2023 (special)	Incumbent re-elected.	▌ ✓ Paul Melotik (Rep.); ▌Dana Glasstein (Dem.)
23	D+28.5	Deb Andraca	Democratic	2020	Incumbent re-elected.	▌ ✓ Deb Andraca (Dem.); ▌Aleaner Pabonnie (Rep.)
24	R+9.9	Dan Knodl	Republican	2008 (Note: Resigned in 2023.); 2024	Incumbent re-elected.	▌ ✓ Dan Knodl (Rep.); ▌Matt Brown (Dem.)
25	R+15.4	Paul Tittl	Republican	2012	Incumbent re-elected.	▌ ✓ Paul Tittl (Rep.); ▌Chris Able (Dem.)
26	D+2.7	Joe Sheehan	Democratic	2024	Incumbent re-elected.	▌ ✓ Joe Sheehan (Dem.); ▌John Belanger (Rep.)
27	R+30	Lindee Brill	Republican	2024	Incumbent re-elected.	▌ ✓ Lindee Brill (Rep.)
28	R+30.4	Robin Kreibich	Republican	1992 (Note: Defeated in 2006 general election.); 2024	Incumbent re-elected.	▌ ✓ Robin Kreibich (Rep.); ▌Robin Lillesve (Dem.)
29	R+27.8	Treig Pronschinske	Republican	2016	Incumbent re-elected.	▌ ✓ Treig Pronschinske (Rep.); ▌Chris Danou (Dem.)
30	R+4.4	Shannon Zimmerman	Republican	2016	Incumbent lost re-election. Democratic gain.	▌ ✓ Kevin Knoke (Dem.); ▌Shannon Zimmerman (Rep.)
31	R+22.6	Tyler August	Republican	2010	Incumbent re-elected.	▌ ✓ Tyler August (Rep.); ▌John Perryman (Dem.)
32	R+31.3	Amanda Nedweski	Republican	2022	Incumbent re-elected.	▌ ✓ Amanda Nedweski (Rep.); ▌Greg Miller (Dem.)
33	R+29.5	Robin Vos	Republican	2004	Incumbent retired. New member elected. Republican hold.	▌ ✓ Rick Stacey (Rep.); ▌Maria Elena Bisabarros (Dem.)
34	R+19.7	Rob Swearingen	Republican	2012	Incumbent re-elected.	▌ ✓ Rob Swearingen (Rep.); ▌Merlin Van Buren (Dem.)
35	R+30.4	Calvin Callahan	Republican	2020	Incumbent re-elected.	▌ ✓ Calvin Callahan (Rep.); ▌Elizabeth McCrank (Dem.)
36	R+38.2	Jeffrey Mursau	Republican	2004	Incumbent re-elected.	▌ ✓ Jeffrey Mursau (Rep.); ▌Shena Chapman (Ind.)
37	R+28.4	Mark Born	Republican	2012	Incumbent re-elected.	▌ ✓ Mark Born (Rep.); ▌LaToya Bates (Dem.)
38	R+30.5	William Penterman	Republican	2021 (special)	Incumbent re-elected.	▌ ✓ William Penterman (Rep.); ▌Terri Wenkman (Dem.)
39	R+33.3	Alex Dallman	Republican	2020	Incumbent re-elected.	▌ ✓ Alex Dallman (Rep.); ▌Michael Skivington (Dem.)
40	D+4.9	Karen DeSanto	Democratic	2024	Incumbent re-elected.	▌ ✓ Karen DeSanto (Dem.); ▌Julie Helmer (Rep.)
41	R+17.4	Tony Kurtz	Republican	2018	Incumbent re-elected.	▌ ✓ Tony Kurtz (Rep.); ▌Zach Commons (Dem.)
42	D+14.9	Maureen McCarville	Democratic	2024	Incumbent re-elected.	▌ ✓ Maureen McCarville (Dem.); ▌Keith F. Miller (Rep.)
43	D+5.2	Brienne Brown	Democratic	2024	Incumbent re-elected.	▌ ✓ Brienne Brown (Dem.); ▌Paul McGraw (Rep.)
44	D+10.8	Ann Roe	Democratic	2024	Incumbent re-elected.	▌ ✓ Ann Roe (Dem.); ▌Ron Woodman (Rep.)
45	D+7.3	Clinton Anderson	Democratic	2022	Incumbent re-elected.	▌ ✓ Clinton Anderson (Dem.); ▌Jocelyn Jordan (Rep.)
46	D+8.1	Joan Fitzgerald	Democratic	2024	Incumbent re-elected.	▌ ✓ Joan Fitzgerald (Dem.); ▌John Donahue (Rep.)
47	D+43.3	Randy Udell	Democratic	2024	Incumbent re-elected.	▌ ✓ Randy Udell (Dem.); ▌Sandy Bakk (Rep.)
48	D+37	Andrew Hysell	Democratic	2024	Incumbent re-elected.	▌ ✓ Andrew Hysell (Dem.); ▌Mark Kjorlie (Rep.)
49	R+17.2	Travis Tranel	Republican	2010	Incumbent re-elected.	▌ ✓ Travis Tranel (Rep.); ▌John Rindy (Dem.)
50	D+14.3	Jenna Jacobson	Democratic	2022	Incumbent retiring to run for state senate. New member elected. Democratic hold.	▌ ✓ Bill Oemichen (Dem.); ▌Jon Aleckson (Rep.)
51	D+5.2	Todd Novak	Republican	2014	Incumbent lost re-election. Democratic gain.	▌ ✓ Ben Gruber (Dem.); ▌Todd Novak (Rep.); ▌Nathan Tataje (Sol.)
52	D+14.6	Lee Snodgrass	Democratic	2020	Incumbent re-elected.	▌ ✓ Lee Snodgrass (Dem.); ▌Reive Pullen (Rep.)
53	D+4.4	Dean Kaufert	Republican	1990 (Note: Did not run for re-election in 2014.); 2024	Incumbent retired. New member elected. Democratic gain.	▌ ✓ Becky Nichols (Dem.); ▌David Daniels (Rep.); ▌Rachael Dowling (Ind.)
54	D+6.9	Lori Palmeri	Democratic	2022	Incumbent re-elected.	▌ ✓ Lori Palmeri (Dem.); ▌Tim Paterson (Rep.)
55	R+16.6	Nate Gustafson	Republican	2022	Incumbent re-elected.	▌ ✓ Nate Gustafson (Rep.); ▌Alex Corrigan (Dem.)
56	R+27.2	Dave Murphy	Republican	2012	Incumbent retired. New member elected. Republican hold.	▌ ✓ Anthony Phillips (Rep.); ▌Grace Abitz (Dem.)
57	R+34.3	Kevin David Petersen	Republican	2006	Incumbent retired. New member elected. Republican hold.	▌ ✓ Kevin Krentz (Rep.); ▌Joey Marschall (Dem.)
58	R+36.5	Rick Gundrum	Republican	2018 (special)	Incumbent retired. New member elected. Republican hold.	▌ ✓ Bernie Newman (Rep.); ▌Dennis D. Degenhardt (Dem.)
59	R+47.8	Robert Brooks	Republican	2014	Incumbent retired. New member elected. Republican hold.	▌ ✓ Bradley Petersen (Rep.); ▌Jack Holzman (Dem.)
60	R+14.3	Jerry L. O'Connor	Republican	2022	Incumbent retired. New member elected. Republican hold.	▌ ✓ Marty Ryan (Rep.); ▌Tiffany Brault (Ind.)
61	D+2.2	Bob Donovan	Republican	2022	Incumbent lost re-election. Democratic gain.	▌ ✓ Ben Brist (Dem.); ▌Bob Donovan (Rep.)
62	D+22.1	Angelina Cruz	Democratic	2024	Incumbent re-elected.	▌ ✓ Angelina Cruz (Dem.); ▌Mike Bellagio (Rep.)
63	R+14.2	Robert Wittke	Republican	2018	Incumbent re-elected.	▌ ✓ Robert Wittke (Rep.); ▌Eddie Phanichkul (Dem.)
64	D+6.3	Tip McGuire	Democratic	2019 (special)	Incumbent re-elected.	▌ ✓ Tip McGuire (Dem.); ▌Ed Hibsch (Rep.)
65	D+7	Ben DeSmidt	Democratic	2024	Incumbent re-elected.	▌ ✓ Ben DeSmidt (Dem.); ▌Valerie Kretchmer (Rep.)
66	D+9.4	Greta Neubauer	Democratic	2018 (special)	Incumbent re-elected.	▌ ✓ Greta Neubauer (Dem.); ▌Gina Cefalu Paulick (Rep.)
67	R+29.5	David Armstrong	Republican	2020	Incumbent re-elected.	▌ ✓ David Armstrong (Rep.); ▌Indiana Thompson (Dem.)
68	R+37.6	Rob Summerfield	Republican	2016	Incumbent re-elected.	▌ ✓ Rob Summerfield (Rep.); ▌Elisha King (Dem.)
69	R+41.3	Karen Hurd	Republican	2022	Incumbent re-elected.	▌ ✓ Karen Hurd (Rep.); ▌Roger Halls (Dem.); ▌Josh Kelley (Ind.)
70	R+25.8	Nancy VanderMeer	Republican	2014	Incumbent re-elected.	▌ ✓ Nancy VanderMeer (Rep.); ▌Stephanie Stuve-Bodeen (Dem.)
71	D+6.7	Vinnie Miresse	Democratic	2024	Incumbent re-elected.	▌ ✓ Vinnie Miresse (Dem.); ▌Jeff Disher (Rep.)
72	R+22.8	Scott Krug	Republican	2010	Incumbent re-elected.	▌ ✓ Scott Krug (Rep.); ▌Christine Maltese (Dem.)
73	D+15.5	Angela Stroud	Democratic	2024	Incumbent re-elected.	▌ ✓ Angela Stroud (Dem.); ▌Frank Kostka (Rep.)
74	R+21.9	Chanz Green	Republican	2022	Incumbent re-elected.	▌ ✓ Chanz Green (Rep.); ▌Paul Johnson (Dem.)
75	R+31.2	Duke Tucker	Republican	2024	Incumbent re-elected.	▌ ✓ Duke Tucker (Rep.); ▌Keith Mogel (Dem.)
76	D+79	Francesca Hong	Democratic	2020	Incumbent retired to run for Governor. New member elected. Democratic hold.	▌ ✓ Dina Nina Martinez-Rutherford (Dem.); ▌Nina Chat (Rep.)
77	D+64.9	Renuka Mayadev	Democratic	2024	Incumbent re-elected.	▌ ✓ Renuka Mayadev (Dem.); ▌Jane McCormick (Rep.)
78	D+61.7	Shelia Stubbs	Democratic	2018	Incumbent re-elected.	▌ ✓ Shelia Stubbs (Dem.); ▌Henry Johnson (Rep.)
79	D+71.8	Lisa Subeck	Democratic	2014	Incumbent re-elected.	▌ ✓ Lisa Subeck (Dem.); ▌John Fons (Rep.)
80	D+48.3	Mike Bare	Democratic	2022	Incumbent re-elected.	▌ ✓ Mike Bare (Dem.); ▌Simran Arora (Rep.)
81	D+38.8	Alex Joers	Democratic	2022	Incumbent re-elected.	▌ ✓ Alex Joers (Dem.); ▌Mark S. Maier (Rep.)
82	R+8.1	Scott Allen	Republican	2014	Incumbent retired. New member elected. Republican hold.	▌ ✓ Bryson Reyes (Rep.); ▌Rico Camacho (Dem.)
83	R+17.4	Dave Maxey	Republican	2022	Incumbent re-elected.	▌ ✓ Dave Maxey (Rep.)
84	R+38.1	Chuck Wichgers	Republican	2016	Incumbent re-elected.	▌ ✓ Chuck Wichgers (Rep.)
85	R+0.6	Patrick Snyder	Republican	2016	Incumbent lost re-election. Democratic gain.	▌ ✓ John Kroll (Dem.); ▌Patrick Snyder (Rep.)
86	R+27.8	John Spiros	Republican	2012	Incumbent re-elected.	▌ ✓ John Spiros (Rep.); ▌Andy Wuethrich (Dem.)
87	R+26.1	Brent Jacobson	Republican	2024	Incumbent re-elected.	▌ ✓ Brent Jacobson (Rep.); ▌Bob Look (Dem.)
88	D+0.4	Ben Franklin	Republican	2024	Incumbent lost re-election. Democratic gain.	▌ ✓ Brandy Tollefson (Dem.); ▌Ben Franklin (Rep.)
89	D+2	Ryan Spaude	Democratic	2024	Incumbent re-elected.	▌ ✓ Ryan Spaude (Dem.); ▌Bobby Lindsey (Rep.)
90	D+10	Amaad Rivera-Wagner	Democratic	2024	Incumbent re-elected.	▌ ✓ Amaad Rivera-Wagner (Dem.); ▌Jessica Henderson (Rep.)
91	D+4.5	Jodi Emerson	Democratic	2018	Incumbent re-elected.	▌ ✓ Jodi Emerson (Dem.); ▌Bruce Stabenow (Rep.)
92	R+7	Clint Moses	Republican	2020	Incumbent lost re-election. Democratic gain.	▌ ✓ Jeremiah Fredrickson (Dem.); ▌Clint Moses (Rep.)
93	D+8.3	Christian Phelps	Democratic	2024	Incumbent re-elected.	▌ ✓ Christian Phelps (Dem.); ▌Michael Ayala (Rep.)
94	R+2.2	Steve Doyle	Democratic	2011 (special)	Incumbent re-elected.	▌ ✓ Steve Doyle (Dem.); ▌Keith Purnell (Rep.)
95	D+2.2	Jill Billings	Democratic	2011 (special)	Incumbent re-elected.	▌ ✓ Jill Billings (Dem.); ▌Cedric Schnitzler (Rep.); ▌Paul Michael Weber (Ind.)
96	D+8.3	Tara Johnson	Democratic	2024	Incumbent re-elected.	▌ ✓ Tara Johnson (Dem.); ▌Jim Green (Rep.)
97	R+33.7	Cindi Duchow	Republican	2015 (special)	Incumbent re-elected.	▌ ✓ Cindi Duchow (Rep.)
98	R+35.3	Jim Piwowarczyk	Republican	2024	Incumbent re-elected.	▌ ✓ Jim Piwowarczyk (Rep.); ▌Matt Philibert (Dem.)
99	R+31.9	Barbara Dittrich	Republican	2018	Incumbent re-elected.	▌ ✓ Barbara Dittrich (Rep.)

== Detailed results ==
=== District 1 ===
Incumbent Republican Joel Kitchens ran for re-election. He faced Democrat Renee Paplham in a rematch of the 2024 race.

District 1 general election (unofficial results)
Party	Candidate	Votes	%
Republican	Joel Kitchens (incumbent)	18,292	57.4%
Democratic	Renee Paplham	13,603	42.6%
Write-in			
Total votes			100.0
Republican hold			

=== District 2 ===
Incumbent Republican Shae Sortwell ran for re-election. He faced Democrat Alicia Saunders in a rematch of the 2024 race.

District 2 general election (unofficial results)
Party	Candidate	Votes	%
Republican	Shae Sortwell (incumbent)	16,071	57.7%
Democratic	Alicia Saunders	11,774	42.3%
Write-in			
Total votes			100.0
Republican hold			

=== District 3 ===
Incumbent Republican Ron Tusler ran for re-election. He faced Democrat Michael J. Goodwin. Tusler was initially running unopposed, but Goodwin won the Democratic nomination after running a write-in campaign in the Democratic primary.

District 3 general election (unofficial results)
Party	Candidate	Votes	%
Republican	Ron Tusler (incumbent)	16,727	59.1%
Democratic	Michael J. Goodwin	11,596	40.9%
Write-in			
Total votes			100.0
Republican hold			

=== District 4 ===
Incumbent Republican David Steffen ran for re-election. He faced Democrat Alexia Unertl in the general election.

District 4 general election (unofficial results)
Party	Candidate	Votes	%
Republican	David Steffen (incumbent)	17,935	61.9%
Democratic	Alexia Unertl	11,061	38.1%
Write-in			
Total votes			100.0
Republican hold			

=== District 5 ===
Incumbent Republican Joy Goeben ran for re-election. She faced Democrat Justin Schumacher and Green party candidate David Schupbach in the general election.

District 5 general election (unofficial results)
Party	Candidate	Votes	%
Republican	Joy Goeben (incumbent)	14,759	54.8%
Democratic	Justin Schumacher	11,456	42.6%
Green	David Schupbach	702	2.6%
Total votes			100.0
Republican hold			

=== District 6 ===
Incumbent Republican Elijah Behnke ran for re-election. He faced Democrat Shirley Hinze in a rematch of the 2024 race.

District 6 general election (unofficial results)
Party	Candidate	Votes	%
Republican	Elijah Behnke (incumbent)	15,894	63.9%
Democratic	Shirley Hinze	8,980	36.1%
Write-in			
Total votes			100.0
Republican hold			

=== District 7 ===
Incumbent Democrat Karen Kirsch ran for re-election. She faced Republican Lee Whiting in a rematch of the 2024 race.

District 7 general election (unofficial results)
Party	Candidate	Votes	%
Democratic	Karen Kirsch (incumbent)	14,184	67.3%
Republican	Lee Whiting	6,891	32.7%
Write-in			
Total votes			100.0
Democratic hold			

=== District 8 ===
Results by precinct: Luna—50–60% Luna—60–70% Luna—70–80% Luna—80–90% Ortiz-Velez—60–70% No Votes

Incumbent Democrat Sylvia Ortiz-Velez ran for re-election. She faced one candidate in the Democratic primary, community activist and first-time candidate Ismael Luna, who had begun his challenge to Ortiz-Velez following her break with the Democratic caucus in late 2025, as well as due to alleged threats she had made against several Democratic colleagues. During her tenure as representative, Ortiz-Velez had also drawn criticism for voting with Republicans on several pieces of legislation. During the campaign, the two candidates shared broadly similar platforms, including support for an AI data center moratorium, renewing the lapsed Knowles-Nelson Stewardship Program, and opposing cooperation between ICE and local and state governments. However, the two candidates differed on the issue of the failed proposed budget-surplus deal, with Ortiz-Velez having voted in favor of the proposal, while Luna stated he would have voted against it. Throughout the primary, Luna saw his campaign gain the support of the Assembly Democratic Campaign Committee and the Working Families Party, as well as Milwaukee alder JoCasta Zamarripa, who represented the district prior to Ortiz-Velez, while Ortiz-Velez was supported by the Jobs First Coalition Political Fund, a Republican donor-group. Ortiz-Velez was defeated in her bid for renomination by a 40-point margin.

Following her defeat in the primary, Ortiz-Velez sought to remove Luna from the ballot and challenged his residency in the district, alleging that he lived in an apartment outside of the district. However the Wisconsin Election Commission dismissed the complaint. Ortiz-Velez subsequently filed to run in the general election as a write-in candidate.

Luna faced Republican Angel Sanchez in the general election. Additionally, Ortiz-Velez ran in the general election as a write-in candidate.

District 8 Democratic primary
Party	Candidate	Votes	%
Democratic	Ismael Luna	2,201	70.25
Democratic	Sylvia Ortiz-Velez (incumbent)	928	29.62
Write-in		4	0.13
Total votes		3,133	100.0

District 8 general election (unofficial results)
Party	Candidate	Votes	%
Democratic	Ismael Luna	8,039	85.8%
Republican	Angel Sanchez	1,327	14.2%
Write-in			
Total votes			100.0
Democratic hold			

=== District 9 ===
Incumbent Democrat Priscilla Prado ran for re-election. She faced Milwaukee school board member Mimi D. Reza in the Democratic primary. During the primary the two Democrats agreed on several issues, such as increasing funding for public schools, renewing the lapsed Knowles-Nelson Stewardship Fund, prohibiting local and state involvement with ICE, as well as protecting local communities from the harms of AI data centers. However, the two candidates diverged on the issue of how the state should regulate AI data centers. The campaign also notably became a proxy for the feud between Prado and fellow Milwaukee legislator Sylvia Ortiz-Velez, as Reza's candidacy had been endorsed and promoted by Ortiz-Velez. Prado defeated Reza by 42-point margin.

Prado faced Republican college student Samuel Guerreo in the general election.

District 9 Democratic primary
Party	Candidate	Votes	%
Democratic	Priscilla Prado (incumbent)	3,019	70.67
Democratic	Mimi D. Reza	1,237	28.96
Write-in		16	0.37
Total votes		4,272	100.0

District 9 general election (unofficial results)
Party	Candidate	Votes	%
Democratic	Priscilla Prado (incumbent)	10,861	80.4%
Republican	Samuel Guerreo	2,654	19.6%
Write-in			
Total votes			100.0
Democratic hold			

=== District 10 ===
Incumbent Democrat Darrin Madison ran for re-election. He faced Green Party candidate Robert Longwell-Grice in the general election.

District 10 general election (unofficial results)
Party	Candidate	Votes	%
Democratic	Darrin Madison (incumbent)	20,564	89.9%
Green	Robert Longwell-Grice	2,303	10.1%
Write-in			
Total votes			100.0
Democratic hold			

=== District 11 ===
Incumbent Democrat Sequanna Taylor ran for re-election. She faced Republican Shandowlyon Reaves in the general election.

District 11 general election (unofficial results)
Party	Candidate	Votes	%
Democratic	Sequanna Taylor (incumbent)	15,331	91.5%
Republican	Shandowlyon Reaves	1,420	8.5%
Write-in			
Total votes			100.0
Democratic hold			

=== District 12 ===
Precinct results: Goodwin—50–60% Goodwin—60–70% Roman—50–60%

Incumbent Democrat Russell Goodwin ran for re-election unopposed. He faced local activist Jordan Roman in the Democratic primary. During the primary Goodwin, who has been characterized as a moderate throughout his first term, faced opposition from more liberal Democrats. He additionally drew criticism and lost support from LGBTQ+ rights groups for voting with Republicans on bills which would prohibit transgender students participation in school sports. The two candidates offered similar proposals to foster police-community relationships, renew the lapsed Knowles-Nelson Stewardship Program, and oppose cooperation between ICE and local and state governments. The two candidates, however, differed on several major issues which faced the legislature that term. One such issue was over a moratorium on the construction of AI data centers, with Goodwin opposing a moratorium and Roman supporting one. Another major area the candidates diverged was on the failed proposed budget-surplus deal, with Goodwin having voted in favor of the proposal, while Roman argued the proposal was imperfect and should have been renegotiated. On election night, Goodwin defeated Roman by an eight-point margin. Goodwin ran unopposed in the general election.

District 12 Democratic primary
Party	Candidate	Votes	%
Democratic	Russell Goodwin (incumbent)	3,746	53.89
Democratic	Jordan Roman	3,184	45.81
Write-in		21	0.30
Total votes		6,951	100.0

District 12 general election (unofficial results)
Party	Candidate	Votes	%
Democratic	Russell Goodwin (incumbent)		100.0%
Write-in			
Total votes			100.0
Democratic hold			

=== District 13 ===
Precinct results: Zimmerman—50–60% Zimmerman—60–70% Zimmerman—70–80% Sanchez—50–60% Sanchez—60–70% No votes

Incumbent Democrat Robyn Vining has declined to seek re-election, instead running for state senate. Democrats David Sanchez and Amy Zimmerman ran to succeed her, with Zimmerman winning the nomination by a close three-point margin. Zimmerman faced Republican Mike Morgan in the general election.

District 13 Democratic primary
Party	Candidate	Votes	%
Democratic	Amy Zimmerman	6,409	51.12
Democratic	David Sanchez	6,118	48.80
Write-in		10	0.08
Total votes		12,537	100.0

District 13 general election (unofficial results)
Party	Candidate	Votes	%
Democratic	Amy Zimmerman	21,117	62.8%
Republican	Mike Morgan	12,515	37.2%
Write-in			
Total votes			100.0
Democratic hold			

=== District 14 ===
Incumbent Democrat Angelito Tenorio ran for re-election. He faced Republican AmyRose Murphy in the general election.

District 14 general election (unofficial results)
Party	Candidate	Votes	%
Democratic	Angelito Tenorio (incumbent)	14,060	62.7%
Republican	AmyRose Murphy	8,367	37.3%
Write-in			
Total votes			100.0
Democratic hold			

=== District 15 ===
Incumbent Republican Adam Neylon ran for re-election. He faced Democrat Stephen Tryon in the general election.

District 15 general election (unofficial results)
Party	Candidate	Votes	%
Republican	Adam Neylon (incumbent)	17,074	54.9%
Democratic	Stephen Tryon	14,036	45.1%
Write-in			
Total votes			100.0
Republican hold			

=== District 16 ===
Incumbent Democrat Kalan Haywood ran for re-election. He faced Republican Alciro Deacon in the general election.

District 16 general election (unofficial results)
Party	Candidate	Votes	%
Democratic	Kalan Haywood (incumbent)	14,774	93.4%
Republican	Alciro Deacon	1,043	6.6%
Write-in			
Total votes			100.0
Democratic hold			

=== District 17 ===
Incumbent Democrat Supreme Moore Omokunde ran for re-election. He faced Republican Charlene Abughrin in the general election.

District 17 general election (unofficial results)
Party	Candidate	Votes	%
Democratic	Supreme Moore Omokunde (incumbent)	19,592	87.6%
Republican	Charlene Abughrin	2,783	12.4%
Write-in			
Total votes			100.0
Democratic hold			

=== District 18 ===
Incumbent Democrat Margaret Arney ran for re-election. She faced Republican Joel Richmond in the general election.

District 18 general election (unofficial results)
Party	Candidate	Votes	%
Democratic	Margaret Arney (incumbent)	17,410	87.0%
Republican	Joel Richmond	2,598	13.0%
Write-in			
Total votes			100.0
Democratic hold			

=== District 19 ===
Results by precinct: Clancy—50–60% Clancy—60–70% Clancy—70–80% Maniaci—50–60% Maniaci—60–70% No votes

Incumbent Democrat Ryan Clancy ran for re-election. He defeated Democrat Bridget Maniaci in the Democratic primary. Clancy faced Republican Yasmine B. Outlaw in the general election.

District 19 Democratic primary
Party	Candidate	Votes	%
Democratic	Ryan Clancy (incumbent)	8,257	54.31
Democratic	Bridget Maniaci	6,914	45.47
Write-in		34	0.22
Total votes		15,205	100.0

District 19 general election (unofficial results)
Party	Candidate	Votes	%
Democratic	Ryan Clancy (incumbent)	26,030	87.1%
Republican	Yasmine B. Outlaw	3,852	12.9%
Write-in			
Total votes			100.0
Democratic hold			

=== District 20 ===
Incumbent Democrat Christine Sinicki ran for re-election. She faced Republican Kyle Cleary in the general election.

District 20 general election (unofficial results)
Party	Candidate	Votes	%
Democratic	Christine Sinicki (incumbent)	17,979	68.9%
Republican	Kyle Cleary	8,106	31.1%
Write-in			
Total votes			100.0
Democratic hold			

=== District 21 ===
Precinct results: Bukiewicz—50–60% Bukiewicz—60–70% Bukiewicz—70–80% Liners—50–60% Liners—60–70% No votes

Incumbent Republican Jessie Rodriguez has declined to seek re-election. Republican Carroll University student Dylan Pfaffenbach ran to succeed her. Two Democrats, union leader Dan J. Bukiewicz and former priest David Liners, ran for the Democratic nomination. Bukiewicz defeated Liners by a 13-point margin. Pfaffenbach faced Bukiewicz in the general election. The district is highly competitive, having voted for both former Vice President Kamala Harris and incumbent Rodriguez. During the 2026 campaign Bukiewicz has ran a campaign on community safety, increasing oversight for AI data centers, while Pfaffenbach focused on lowering property taxes, increasing access to affordable healthcare, and regulating data centers as well.

Precinct results: Bukiewicz—50–60% Bukiewicz—60–70% Bukiewicz—70–80% Bukiewicz—80–90% Pfaffenbach—50–60%

District 21 Democratic primary
Party	Candidate	Votes	%
Democratic	Dan J. Bukiewicz	4,585	56.69
Democratic	David Liners	3,485	43.09
Write-in		18	0.22
Total votes		8,088	100.0

District 21 general election (unofficial results)
Party	Candidate	Votes	%
Democratic	Dan J. Bukiewicz	15,942	62.5%
Republican	Dylan Pfaffenbach	9,567	37.5%
Write-in			
Total votes			100.0
Democratic gain from Republican			

=== District 22 ===
Incumbent Republican Paul Melotik ran for re-election. He faced Democrat Dana Glasstein in a rematch of the 2024 election.

District 22 general election (unofficial results)
Party	Candidate	Votes	%
Republican	Paul Melotik (incumbent)	17,739	53.1%
Democratic	Dana Glasstein	15,696	46.9%
Write-in			
Total votes			100.0
Republican hold			

=== District 23 ===
Incumbent Democrat Deb Andraca ran for re-election. She faced Republican Aleaner Pabonnie.

District 23 general election (unofficial results)
Party	Candidate	Votes	%
Democratic	Deb Andraca (incumbent)	22,387	68.6%
Republican	John Belanger	10,263	31.4%
Write-in			
Total votes			100.0
Democratic hold			

=== District 24 ===
Incumbent Republican Dan Knodl ran for re-election. He faced Democrat Matt Brown.

District 24 general election (unofficial results)
Party	Candidate	Votes	%
Republican	Dan Knodl (incumbent)	17,687	54.1%
Democratic	Matt Brown	15,036	45.9%
Write-in			
Total votes			100.0
Republican hold			

=== District 25 ===
Incumbent Republican Paul Tittl ran for re-election. He faced Democrat Chris Able.

District 25 general election (unofficial results)
Party	Candidate	Votes	%
Republican	Paul Tittl (incumbent)	13,268	55.0%
Democratic	Chris Able	10,867	45.0%
Write-in			
Total votes			100.0
Republican hold			

=== District 26 ===
Incumbent Democrat Joe Sheehan ran for re-election. He defeated Republican John Belanger. During the campaign Sheehan has promoted legislation he authored during his first term to make over-the-counter medication and childcare more affordable, and pushed to expand medicaid in the state. Belganger has ran a campaign focused on affordability and regulating data centers, while calling for measures to make healthcare more affordable.

District 26 Republican primary
Party	Candidate	Votes	%
Republican	John Belanger	2,080	63.45
Republican	James Brotz	748	22.82
Republican	Tyler Schneekloth	444	13.55
Write-in		6	0.18
Total votes		3,278	100.0

District 26 general election (unofficial results)
Party	Candidate	Votes	%
Democratic	Joe Sheehan (incumbent)	12,937	58.3%
Republican	John Belanger	9,268	41.7%
Write-in			
Total votes			100.0
Democratic hold			

=== District 27 ===
Incumbent Republican Lindee Brill ran for re-election unopposed.

District 27 general election
Party	Candidate	Votes	%
Republican	Lindee Brill (incumbent)		
Write-in			
Total votes			100.0
Republican hold			

=== District 28 ===
Incumbent Republican Robin Kreibich ran for re-election. He faced Democrat Robin Lillesve.

District 28 general election (unofficial results)
Party	Candidate	Votes	%
Republican	Robin Kreibich (incumbent)	17,609	63.2%
Democratic	Robin Lillesve	10,274	36.8%
Write-in			
Total votes			100.0
Republican hold			

=== District 29 ===
Incumbent Republican Treig Pronschinske ran for re-election. He faced Democrat and former legislator Chris Danou in a rematch of the 2016 race in what was then the 92nd Assembly district.

District 29 general election (unofficial results)
Party	Candidate	Votes	%
Republican	Treig Pronschinske (incumbent)	15,887	60.8%
Democratic	Chris Danou	10,243	39.2%
Write-in			
Total votes			100.0
Republican hold			

=== District 30 ===
Incumbent Republican Shannon Zimmerman ran for re-election. He faced Democrat and educator Kevin Knoke in the general election. During the campaign AI data centers have taken a prominent role, as Zimmerman helped author a sales tax exemption for companies seeking to build data centers. Knoke has also criticized Zimmerman for potential conflicts of interest, citing Zimmerman's past ties to AI companies. The two candidates also broke on education funding, while agreeing that the funding formula needed reform, with Zimmerman favoring following Iowa's model of consoliation, while Knoke has sought to abolish the state-wide school voucher program and redistribute its funds. He has also faced criticism from Knoke and other opponents over having missed over 225 votes during the 107th Wisconsin legislature. Knoke, a former teacher, has focused his campaign on affordability, increasing access to housing, and increasing funding for public schools. He has also made opposition to data centers a major focus of his candidacy, having attended several protests against new AI data centers in the district.

Precinct results: Knoke—50–60% Knoke—60–70% Zimmerman—50–60%

District 30 general election (unofficial results)
Party	Candidate	Votes	%
Democratic	Kevin Knoke	16,336	53.0%
Republican	Shannon Zimmerman (incumbent)	14,513	47.0%
Write-in			
Total votes			100.0
Democratic gain from Republican			

=== District 31 ===
Incumbent Republican Tyler August ran for re-election. He faced Democrat John Perryman in the general election.

District 31 general election (unofficial results)
Party	Candidate	Votes	%
Republican	Tyler August (incumbent)	15,232	58.9%
Democratic	John Perryman	10,613	41.1%
Write-in			
Total votes			100.0
Republican hold			

=== District 32 ===
Incumbent Republican Amanda Nedweski ran for re-election. She faced Democrat Greg Miller in the general election.

District 32 general election (unofficial results)
Party	Candidate	Votes	%
Republican	Amanda Nedweski (incumbent)	16,364	61.5%
Democratic	Greg Miller	10,239	38.5%
Write-in			
Total votes			100.0
Republican hold			

=== District 33 ===
Incumbent Republican and Assembly speaker Robin Vos has declined to seek re-election. Republican and Union Grove village president Steve Wicklund faced Democrat and business owner Maria Elena Bisabarros in the general election.

District 33 Republican primary
Party	Candidate	Votes	%
Republican	Rick Stacey	3,950	54.42
Republican	Steve Wicklund	3,301	45.47
Write-in		8	0.11
Total votes		7,259	100.0

District 33 Democratic primary
Party	Candidate	Votes	%
Democratic	Maria Elena Bisabarros	2,924	61.73
Democratic	Rick Bailey	1,807	38.15
Write-in		6	0.13
Total votes		4,737	100.0

District 33 general election (unofficial results)
Party	Candidate	Votes	%
Republican	Rick Stacey	17,160	62.3%
Democratic	Maria Elena Bisabarros	10,367	37.7%
Write-in			
Total votes			100.0
Republican hold			

=== District 34 ===
Incumbent Republican Rob Swearingen ran for re-election. He faced Democrat Merlin Van Buren in a rematch of the 2012 race for this seat.

District 34 general election (unofficial results)
Party	Candidate	Votes	%
Republican	Rob Swearingen (incumbent)	19,083	59.2%
Democratic	Merlin Van Buren	13,142	40.8%
Write-in			
Total votes			100.0
Republican hold			

=== District 35 ===
Incumbent Republican Calvin Callahan ran for re-election. He faced Democrat Elizabeth McCrank in a rematch of the 2024 race for this seat.

District 35 general election (unofficial results)
Party	Candidate	Votes	%
Republican	Calvin Callahan (incumbent)	17,863	63.3%
Democratic	Elizabeth McCrank	10,354	36.7%
Write-in			
Total votes			100.0
Republican hold			

=== District 36 ===
Incumbent Republican Jeffrey Mursau ran for re-election. He faced Independent Shena Chapman in the general election.

District 36 general election (unofficial results)
Party	Candidate	Votes	%
Republican	Jeffrey Mursau (incumbent)	18,485	70.4%
Independent	Shena Chapman	7,762	29.6%
Write-in			
Total votes			100.0
Republican hold			

=== District 37 ===
Incumbent Republican Mark Born ran for re-election. He faced Republican Steve Rydzewski in the primary, defeating him by 30-points. Born faced Democrat LaToya Bates in a rematch of the 2024 race for this seat.

District 37 Republican primary
Party	Candidate	Votes	%
Republican	Mark Born (incumbent)	4,124	65.66
Republican	Steve Rydzewski	2,157	34.34
Write-in		0	0.00
Total votes		6,281	100.0

District 37 general election (unofficial results)
Party	Candidate	Votes	%
Republican	Mark Born (incumbent)	14,331	62.9%
Democratic	LaToya Bates	8,435	37.1%
Write-in			
Total votes			100.0
Republican hold			

=== District 38 ===
Incumbent Republican William Penterman ran for re-election. He faced Democrat Terri Wenkman in the general election.

District 38 general election (unofficial results)
Party	Candidate	Votes	%
Republican	William Penterman (incumbent)	15,482	62.0%
Democratic	Terri Wenkman	9,474	38.0%
Write-in			
Total votes			100.0
Republican hold			

=== District 39 ===
Incumbent Republican Alex Dallman ran for re-election. He faced Democrat Michael Skivington in the general election.

District 39 general election (unofficial results)
Party	Candidate	Votes	%
Republican	Alex Dallman (incumbent)	17,484	66.3%
Democratic	Michael Skivington	8,886	33.7%
Write-in			
Total votes			100.0
Republican hold			

=== District 40 ===
Incumbent Democrat Karen DeSanto ran for re-election. She faced Republican Julie Helmer in the general election.

District 40 general election (unofficial results)
Party	Candidate	Votes	%
Democratic	Karen DeSanto (incumbent)	15,372	58.0%
Republican	Julie Helmer	11,139	42.0%
Write-in			
Total votes			100.0
Democratic hold			

=== District 41 ===
Incumbent Republican Tony Kurtz ran for re-election. He faced Democrat Zach Commons in the general election.

District 41 general election (unofficial results)
Party	Candidate	Votes	%
Republican	Tony Kurtz (incumbent)	14,728	59.8%
Democratic	Zach Commons	9,888	40.2%
Write-in			
Total votes			100.0
Republican hold			

=== District 42 ===
Incumbent Democrat Maureen McCarville ran for re-election. She faced Republican Keith F. Miller in the general election.

District 42 general election (unofficial results)
Party	Candidate	Votes	%
Democratic	Maureen McCarville (incumbent)	19,180	62.0%
Republican	Keith F. Miller	11,772	38.0%
Write-in			
Total votes			100.0
Democratic hold			

=== District 43 ===
Incumbent Democrat Brienne Brown ran for re-election. She faced Republican Paul McGraw in the general election.

District 43 general election (unofficial results)
Party	Candidate	Votes	%
Democratic	Brienne Brown (incumbent)	15,461	58.8%
Republican	Keith F. Miller	10,848	41.2%
Write-in			
Total votes			100.0
Democratic hold			

=== District 44 ===
Incumbent Democrat Ann Roe ran for re-election. She faced Republican Ron Woodman in the general election.

District 44 general election (unofficial results)
Party	Candidate	Votes	%
Democratic	Ann Roe (incumbent)	14,786	61.8%
Republican	Ron Woodman	9,144	38.2%
Write-in			
Total votes			100.0
Democratic hold			

=== District 45 ===
Incumbent Democrat Clinton Anderson ran for re-election. He faced Republican Jocelyn Jordan in the general election.

District 45 general election (unofficial results)
Party	Candidate	Votes	%
Democratic	Clinton Anderson (incumbent)	12,831	60.8%
Republican	Jocelyn Jordan	8,276	39.2%
Write-in			
Total votes			100.0
Democratic hold			

=== District 46 ===
Incumbent Democrat Joan Fitzgerald ran for re-election. She faced Republican John Donahue in the general election.

District 46 general election
Party	Candidate	Votes	%
Democratic	Joan Fitzgerald (incumbent)	17,545	59.7%
Republican	John Donahue	11,838	40.3%
Write-in			
Total votes			100.0
Democratic hold			

=== District 47 ===
Incumbent Democrat Randy Udell ran for re-election. He faced Republican Sandy Bakk in the general election.

District 47 general election (unofficial results)
Party	Candidate	Votes	%
Democratic	Randy Udell (incumbent)	25,146	76.8%
Republican	Sandy Bakk	7,577	23.2%
Write-in			
Total votes			100.0
Democratic hold			

=== District 48 ===
Incumbent Democrat Andrew Hysell ran for re-election. He faced Republican Mark Kjorlie in the general election.

District 48 general election (unofficial results)
Party	Candidate	Votes	%
Democratic	Andrew Hysell (incumbent)	22,012	73.7%
Republican	Mark Kjorlie	7,875	26.3%
Write-in			
Total votes			100.0
Democratic hold			

=== District 49 ===
Incumbent Republican Travis Tranel ran for re-election. He faced Democrat John Rindy in the general election.

District 49 general election (unofficial results)
Party	Candidate	Votes	%
Republican	Travis Tranel (incumbent)	13,392	56.8%
Democratic	John Rindy	10,186	43.2%
Write-in			
Total votes			100.0
Republican hold			

=== District 50 ===
Precinct results: Oemichen—30–40% Oemichen—40–50% Oemichen—50–60% Oemichen—60–70% Oemichen—70–80% Oemichen—80–90% Mittness—40–50% Mittness—50–60% Mittness—60–70% Caves—30–40% Caves—40–50%

Incumbent Democrat Jenna Jacobson declined to seek re-election, instead running for Wisconsin State Senate. Democrat Bill Oemichen defeated Josh Mittness and Bryna Caves and faced Republican Jon Aleckson in the general election.

District 50 Democratic primary
Party	Candidate	Votes	%
Democratic	Bill Oemichen	5,058	50.47
Democratic	Josh Mittness	3,089	30.82
Democratic	Bryna Caves	1,869	18.65
Write-in		6	0.06
Total votes		10,022	100.0

District 50 general election (unofficial results)
Party	Candidate	Votes	%
Democratic	Bill Oemichen	18,462	61.2%
Republican	Jon Aleckson	11,709	38.8%
Write-in			
Total votes			100.0
Democratic hold			

=== District 51 ===
Incumbent Republican Todd Novak ran for re-election. He faced Democrat Ben Gruber and American Solidarity candidate Nathan Tataje in the general election.

District 51 general election (unofficial results)
Party	Candidate	Votes	%
Democratic	Ben Gruber	14,863	54.6%
Republican	Todd Novak (incumbent)	11,907	43.7%
American Solidarity	Nathan Tataje	447	1.6%
Write-in			
Total votes			100.0
Democratic gain from Republican			

=== District 52 ===
Incumbent Democrat Lee Snodgrass ran for re-election. She faced Republican Reive Pullen in the general election.

District 52 general election (unofficial results)
Party	Candidate	Votes	%
Democratic	Lee Snodgrass (incumbent)	15,878	63.6%
Republican	Reive Pullen	9,086	36.4%
Write-in			
Total votes			100.0
Democratic hold			

=== District 53 ===
Incumbent Republican Dean Kaufert has declined to seek re-election. Republican David Daniels faced Democrat Becky Nichols and independent Rachael Dowling in the general election.

District 53 general election (unofficial results)
Party	Candidate	Votes	%
Democratic	Becky Nichols	13,177	54.7%
Republican	David Daniels	9,394	39.0%
Independent	Rachael Dowling	1,530	6.3%
Write-in			
Total votes			100.0
Democratic gain from Republican			

=== District 54 ===
Incumbent Democrat Lori Palmeri ran for re-election. She faced Republican Tim Paterson in the general election in a rematch of the 2024 race.

District 54 general election (unofficial results)
Party	Candidate	Votes	%
Democratic	Lori Palmeri (incumbent)	12,294	60.7%
Republican	Tim Paterson	7,964	39.3%
Write-in			
Total votes			100.0
Democratic hold			

=== District 55 ===
Incumbent Republican Nate Gustafson ran for re-election. He faced Democrat Alex Corrigan in the general election.

District 55 general election (unofficial results)
Party	Candidate	Votes	%
Republican	Nate Gustafson (incumbent)	16,608	55.7%
Democratic	Alex Corrigan	13,197	44.3%
Write-in			
Total votes			100.0
Republican hold			

=== District 56 ===
Incumbent Republican Dave Murphy has declined to seek re-election. Republican Anthony Phillips faced Democrat Grace Abitz, who defeated Shawna Riley in the Democratic primary, in the general election.

District 56 Democratic primary
Party	Candidate	Votes	%
Democratic	Grace Abitz	3,251	58.94
Democratic	Shawna Riley	2,264	41.04
Write-in		1	0.02
Total votes		5,516	100.0

District 56 general election (unofficial results)
Party	Candidate	Votes	%
Republican	Anthony Phillips	17,183	59.8%
Democratic	Grace Abitz	11,540	40.2%
Write-in			
Total votes			100.0
Republican hold			

=== District 57 ===
Incumbent Republican Kevin David Petersen has declined to seek re-election. Republican candidate and dairy farmer Kevin Krentz defeated salesperson Ed Delgado, former representative and perennial candidate Bill Lorge, and 2024 independent candidate Dylan Testin in the Republican primary. Krentz faced Democratic candidate and bartender Joey Marschall in the general election.

District 57 Republican primary
Party	Candidate	Votes	%
Republican	Kevin Krentz	5,120	55.72
Republican	Dylan Testin	2,396	26.08
Republican	Bill Lorge	870	9.47
Republican	Ed Delgado	799	8.70
Write-in		3	0.03
Total votes		9,188	100.0

District 57 general election (unofficial results)
Party	Candidate	Votes	%
Republican	Kevin Krentz	18,148	65.8%
Democratic	Joey Marschall	9,434	34.2%
Write-in			
Total votes			100.0
Republican hold			

=== District 58 ===
Incumbent Republican Rick Gundrum has declined to seek re-election. Republican Bernie Newman faced and defeated Chris Bossert in the Republican primary, Newman faced Democrat Dennis D. Degenhardt in the general election.

District 58 Republican primary
Party	Candidate	Votes	%
Republican	Bernie Newman	4,284	59.52
Republican	Chris Bossert	2,909	40.41
Write-in		5	0.07
Total votes		7,198	100.0

District 58 general election (unofficial results)
Party	Candidate	Votes	%
Republican	Bernie Newman	19,724	67.1%
Democratic	Dennis D. Degenhardt	9,680	32.9%
Write-in			
Total votes			100.0
Republican hold			

=== District 59 ===
Incumbent Republican Robert Brooks has declined to seek re-election. Republican Bradley Petersen faced Democrat Jack Holzman in the general election.

District 59 general election (unofficial results)
Party	Candidate	Votes	%
Republican	Bradley Petersen	22,111	72.6%
Democratic	Jack Holzman	8,332	27.4%
Write-in			
Total votes			100.0
Republican hold			

=== District 60 ===
Incumbent Republican Jerry L. O'Connor has declined to seek re-election. Republican Marty Ryan faced independent Tiffany Brault in the general election.

District 60 general election (unofficial results)
Party	Candidate	Votes	%
Republican	Marty Ryan	12,091	56.6%
Independent	Tiffany Brault	9,273	43.4%
Write-in			
Total votes			100.0
Republican hold			

=== District 61 ===
Primary results by precinct: Brist—40–50% Brist—50–60% Chambers—40–50% Chambers—50–60% Tie—43.51% No Votes

Incumbent Republican Bob Donovan ran for re-election. He faced Democrat Ben Brist in the general election. Brist defeated Lawanda Chambers and Brian Bock in the Democratic primary.

District 61 Democratic primary
Party	Candidate	Votes	%
Democratic	Ben Brist	3,605	44.07
Democratic	Lawanda Chambers	3,077	37.62
Democratic	Brian Bock	1,489	18.20
Write-in		9	0.11
Total votes		8,180	100.0

District 61 general election (unofficial results)
Party	Candidate	Votes	%
Democratic	Ben Brist	15,100	56.2%
Republican	Bob Donovan (incumbent)	11,745	43.8%
Write-in			
Total votes			100.0
Democratic gain from Republican			

=== District 62 ===
Incumbent Democrat Angelina Cruz ran for re-election. She faced Republican Mike Bellagio.

District 62 general election (unofficial results)
Party	Candidate	Votes	%
Democratic	Angelina Cruz (incumbent)	13,444	66.4%
Republican	Mike Bellagio	6,789	33.6%
Write-in			
Total votes			100.0
Democratic hold			

=== District 63 ===
Incumbent Republican Robert Wittke ran for re-election. He faced Democrat Eddie Phanichkul in the general election.

District 63 general election (unofficial results)
Party	Candidate	Votes	%
Republican	Robert Wittke (incumbent)	15,635	53.5%
Democratic	Eddie Phanichkul	13,594	46.5%
Write-in			
Total votes			100.0
Republican hold			

=== District 64 ===
Incumbent Democrat Tip McGuire ran for re-election. He faced four-time candidate for this district Ed Hibsch in the general election.

District 64 general election (unofficial results)
Party	Candidate	Votes	%
Democratic	Tip McGuire (incumbent)	13,561	62.2%
Republican	Ed Hibsch	8,255	37.8%
Write-in			
Total votes			100.0
Democratic hold			

=== District 65 ===
Incumbent Democrat Ben DeSmidt ran for re-election. He faced Republican Valerie Kretchmer in the general election.

District 65 general election (unofficial results)
Party	Candidate	Votes	%
Democratic	Ben DeSmidt (incumbent)	13,336	60.7%
Republican	Valerie Kretchmer	8,636	39.3%
Write-in			
Total votes			100.0
Democratic hold			

=== District 66 ===
Incumbent Democrat and minority leader Greta Neubauer ran for re-election. She faced Republican Gina Cefalu Paulick in the general election.

District 66 general election (unofficial results)
Party	Candidate	Votes	%
Democratic	Greta Neubauer (incumbent)	13,985	59.9%
Republican	Gina Cefalu Paulick	9,354	40.1%
Write-in			
Total votes			100.0
Democratic hold			

=== District 67 ===
Incumbent Republican David Armstrong ran for re-election. He faced Democrat Indiana Thompson in the general election.

District 67 general election (unofficial results)
Party	Candidate	Votes	%
Republican	David Armstrong (incumbent)	16,587	63.4%
Democratic	Indiana Thompson	9,566	36.6%
Write-in			
Total votes			100.0
Republican hold			

=== District 68 ===
Incumbent Republican Rob Summerfield ran for re-election. He faced Elisha King in the general election.

District 68 general election (unofficial results)
Party	Candidate	Votes	%
Republican	Rob Summerfield (incumbent)	19,381	68.7%
Democratic	Elisha King	8,818	31.3%
Write-in			
Total votes			100.0
Republican hold			

=== District 69 ===
Incumbent Republican Karen Hurd ran for re-election. She faced Democrat Roger Hall and independent Josh Kelley in a rematch of the 2024 election.

District 69 general election (unofficial results)
Party	Candidate	Votes	%
Republican	Karen Hurd (incumbent)	13,880	67.3%
Democratic	Roger Hall	5,689	27.6%
Independent	Josh Kelley	1,045	5.1%
Write-in			
Total votes			100.0
Republican hold			

=== District 70 ===
Incumbent Republican Nancy VanderMeer ran for re-election. She faced Democratic candidate and author Stephanie Stuve-Bodeen.

District 70 general election (unofficial results)
Party	Candidate	Votes	%
Republican	Nancy VanderMeer (incumbent)	13,850	61.2%
Democratic	Stephanie Stuve-Bodeen	8,794	38.8%
Write-in			
Total votes			100.0
Republican hold			

=== District 71 ===
Incumbent Democrat Vinnie Miresse ran for re-election. He faced Republican Jeff Disher in the general election.

District 71 general election (unofficial results)
Party	Candidate	Votes	%
Democratic	Vinnie Miresse (incumbent)	17,135	60.2%
Republican	Jeff Disher	11,309	39.8%
Write-in			
Total votes			100.0
Democratic hold			

=== District 72 ===
Incumbent Republican Scott Krug ran for re-election. He faced Democrat Christine Maltese in the general election.

District 72 general election (unofficial results)
Party	Candidate	Votes	%
Republican	Scott Krug (incumbent)	16,343	60.2%
Democratic	Christine Maltese	10,814	39.8%
Write-in			
Total votes			100.0
Republican hold			

=== District 73 ===
Incumbent Democrat Angela Stroud ran for re-election. She faced Republican Frank Kostka in a rematch of the 2024 election.

District 73 general election (unofficial results)
Party	Candidate	Votes	%
Democratic	Angela Stroud (incumbent)	17,146	64.5%
Republican	Frank Kostka	9,455	35.5%
Write-in			
Total votes			100.0
Democratic hold			

=== District 74 ===
Precinct results: Green—50–60% Green—60–70% Green—70–80% Green—80–90% Green—90–100% Harbridge—50–60% Harbridge—60–70% Harbridge—70–80% Tie—50%

Incumbent Republican Chanz Green ran for re-election. He defeated Republican Scott Harbridge by a 30-point margin in the primary. Green faced Democrat Paul Johnson in the general election.

District 74 Republican primary
Party	Candidate	Votes	%
Republican	Chanz Green (incumbent)	6,578	63.34
Republican	Scott Harbridge	3,797	36.56
Write-in		10	0.10
Total votes		10,365	100.0

District 74 general election (unofficial results)
Party	Candidate	Votes	%
Republican	Chanz Green (incumbent)	17,956	58.3%
Democratic	Paul Johnson	12,864	41.7%
Write-in			
Total votes			100.0
Republican hold			

=== District 75 ===
Incumbent Republican Duke Tucker ran for re-election. He faced Democrat Keith Mogel in the general election.

District 75 general election (unofficial results)
Party	Candidate	Votes	%
Republican	Duke Tucker (incumbent)	18,486	63.3%
Democratic	Keith Mogel	10,734	36.7%
Write-in			
Total votes			100.0
Republican hold			

=== District 76 ===
Results by precinct: Martinez-Rutherford—20-30% Martinez-Rutherford—30–40% Martinez-Rutherford—40–50% Bennett—30–40% Bennett—30–40% Bennett—40–50% Ben-Ami—20-30% Ben-Ami—30–40% Martinez-Rutherford–Ben-Ami tie—26.63%

Incumbent Democrat Francesca Hong declined to seek re-election, instead seeking the Democratic nomination for governor. Madison District 15 Alderwoman Dina Nina Martinez-Rutherford defeated former District 8 Alderwoman Juliana Bennett, policy director to Assistant Assembly Minority Leader Kalan Haywood Isaia Ben-Ami, activist Tony Castañeda, and journalist Zoe Sullivan in the primary election and faced Republican Nina Chat.

District 76 Democratic primary
Party	Candidate	Votes	%
Democratic	Dina Nina Martinez-Rutherford	6,170	29.42
Democratic	Juliana Bennett	5,668	27.03
Democratic	Isaia Ben-Ami	4,573	21.81
Democratic	Tony Castañeda	3,213	15.32
Democratic	Zoe Sullivan	1,313	6.26
Write-in		33	0.16
Total votes		20,970	100.0

District 76 general election (unofficial results)
Party	Candidate	Votes	%
Democratic	Dina Nina Martinez-Rutherford	31,577	92.7%
Republican	Nina Chat	2,497	7.3%
Write-in			
Total votes			100.0
Democratic hold			

=== District 77 ===
Incumbent Democrat Renuka Mayadev ran for re-election. She faced Republican Jane McCormick in the general election.

District 77 general election (unofficial results)
Party	Candidate	Votes	%
Democratic	Renuka Mayadev (incumbent)	24,232	89.5%
Republican	Jane McCormick	2,830	10.5%
Write-in			
Total votes			100.0
Democratic hold			

=== District 78 ===
Incumbent Democrat Shelia Stubbs ran for re-election. She faced Republican Henry Johnson in the general election.

District 78 general election (unofficial results)
Party	Candidate	Votes	%
Democratic	Shelia Stubbs (incumbent)	26,206	85.2%
Republican	Henry Johnson	4,537	14.8%
Write-in			
Total votes			100.0
Democratic hold			

=== District 79 ===
Incumbent Democrat Lisa Subeck ran for re-election. She faced Republican John Fons in the general election.

District 79 general election (unofficial results)
Party	Candidate	Votes	%
Democratic	Lisa Subeck (incumbent)	29,409	88.8%
Republican	John Fons	3,704	11.2%
Write-in			
Total votes			100.0
Democratic hold			

=== District 80 ===
Incumbent Democrat Mike Bare ran for re-election. He faced Republican Simran Arora in the general election.

District 80 general election (unofficial results)
Party	Candidate	Votes	%
Democratic	Mike Bare (incumbent)	28,840	78.8%
Republican	Simran Arora	7,778	21.2%
Write-in			
Total votes			100.0
Democratic hold			

=== District 81 ===
Incumbent Democrat Alex Joers ran for re-election. He faced Republican Mark S. Maier in the general election.

District 81 general election (unofficial results)
Party	Candidate	Votes	%
Democratic	Alex Joers (incumbent)	25,180	72.6%
Republican	Mark S. Maier	9,494	27.4%
Write-in			
Total votes			100.0
Democratic hold			

=== District 82 ===
Incumbent Republican Scott Allen declined to seek re-election. Republican Bryson Reyes faced Democrat Rico Camacho in the general election.

District 82 general election (unofficial results)
Party	Candidate	Votes	%
Republican	Bryson Reyes	12,603	51.2%
Democratic	Rico Camacho	12,002	48.8%
Write-in			
Total votes			100.0
Republican hold			

=== District 83 ===
Incumbent Republican Dave Maxey ran for re-election unopposed.

District 83 general election (unofficial results)
Party	Candidate	Votes	%
Republican	Dave Maxey (incumbent)		100.0%
Write-in			
Total votes			100.0
Republican hold			

=== District 84 ===
Incumbent Republican Chuck Wichgers ran for re-election unopposed.

District 84 general election (unofficial results)
Party	Candidate	Votes	%
Republican	Chuck Wichgers (incumbent)		100.0%
Write-in			
Total votes			100.0
Republican hold			

=== District 85 ===
Incumbent Republican Patrick Snyder ran for re-election. He faced Democrat John Kroll in the general election.

District 85 general election (unofficial results)
Party	Candidate	Votes	%
Democratic	John Kroll	12,377	54.1%
Republican	Patrick Snyder (incumbent)	10,512	45.9%
Write-in			
Total votes			100.0
Democratic gain from Republican			

=== District 86 ===
Incumbent Republican John Spiros ran for re-election. He faced Democrat Andy Wuethrich in the general election.

District 86 general election (unofficial results)
Party	Candidate	Votes	%
Republican	John Spiros (incumbent)	16,760	61.5%
Democratic	Andy Wuethrich	10,477	38.5%
Write-in			
Total votes			100.0
Republican hold			

=== District 87 ===
Incumbent Republican Brent Jacobson ran for re-election. He faced Democrat Bob Look in the general election.

District 87 general election (unofficial results)
Party	Candidate	Votes	%
Republican	Brent Jacobson (incumbent)	17,269	61.1%
Democratic	Bob Look	10,977	38.9%
Write-in			
Total votes			100.0
Republican hold			

=== District 88 ===
Incumbent Republican Ben Franklin ran for re-election. He faced Democrat Brandy Tollefson in the general election.

District 88 general election (unofficial results)
Party	Candidate	Votes	%
Democratic	Brandy Tollefson	14,593	54.3%
Republican	Ben Franklin (incumbent)	12,267	45.7%
Write-in			
Total votes			100.0
Democratic gain from Republican			

=== District 89 ===
Incumbent Democrat Ryan Spaude ran for re-election. He faced Republican Bobby Lindsey in the general election.

District 89 general election (unofficial results)
Party	Candidate	Votes	%
Democratic	Ryan Spaude (incumbent)	12,608	56.5%
Republican	Bobby Lindsey	9,717	43.5%
Write-in			
Total votes			100.0
Democratic hold			

=== District 90 ===
Incumbent Democrat Amaad Rivera-Wagner ran for re-election. He faced Republican Jessica Henderson in a rematch of the 2024 election.

District 90 general election (unofficial results)
Party	Candidate	Votes	%
Democratic	Amaad Rivera-Wagner (incumbent)	11,320	61.3%
Republican	Jessica Henderson	7,133	38.7%
Write-in			
Total votes			100.0
Democratic hold			

=== District 91 ===
Incumbent Democrat Jodi Emerson ran for re-election. She faced Republican Bruce Stabenow in the general election.

District 91 general election (unofficial results)
Party	Candidate	Votes	%
Democratic	Jodi Emerson (incumbent)	16,495	59.5%
Republican	Bruce Stabenow	11,209	40.5%
Write-in			
Total votes			100.0
Democratic hold			

=== District 92 ===
Incumbent Republican Clint Moses ran for re-election. He faced Democrat Jeremiah Fredrickson, who defeated candidate Mel Martin in the Democratic primary.

District 92 Democratic primary
Party	Candidate	Votes	%
Democratic	Jeremiah Fredrickson	4,955	79.19
Democratic	Mel M. Martin	1,295	20.70
Write-in		7	0.11
Total votes		6,257	100.0

District 92 general election (unofficial results)
Party	Candidate	Votes	%
Democratic	Jeremiah Fredrickson	13,870	53.4%
Republican	Clint Moses (incumbent)	12,106	46.6%
Write-in			
Total votes			100.0
Democratic gain from Republican			

=== District 93 ===
Incumbent Democrat Christian Phelps ran for re-election. He faced Republican Michael Ayala in the general election.

District 93 general election (unofficial results)
Party	Candidate	Votes	%
Democratic	Christian Phelps (incumbent)	17,627	61.7%
Republican	Michael Ayala	10,953	38.3%
Write-in			
Total votes			100.0
Democratic hold			

=== District 94 ===
Incumbent Democrat Steve Doyle ran for re-election. He faced Republican Keith Purnell in the general election.

District 94 general election (unofficial results)
Party	Candidate	Votes	%
Democratic	Steve Doyle (incumbent)	16,847	56.7%
Republican	Keith Purnell	12,861	43.3%
Write-in			
Total votes			100.0
Democratic hold			

=== District 95 ===
Incumbent Democrat Jill Billings ran for re-election. She faced Republican Cedric Schnitzler and independent candidate Paul Michael Weber in the general election.

District 95 general election (unofficial results)
Party	Candidate	Votes	%
Democratic	Jill Billings (incumbent)	14,451	58.7%
Republican	Cedric Schnitzler	9,677	39.3%
Independent	Paul Michael Weber	484	2.0%
Write-in			
Total votes			100.0
Democratic hold			

=== District 96 ===
Incumbent Democrat Tara Johnson ran for re-election. She faced Republican Jim Green in the general election.

District 96 general election (unofficial results)
Party	Candidate	Votes	%
Democratic	Tara Johnson (incumbent)	16,250	60.9%
Republican	Jim Green	10,418	39.1%
Write-in			
Total votes			100.0
Democratic hold			

=== District 97 ===
Incumbent Republican Cindi Duchow ran for re-election unopposed.

District 97 general election (unofficial results)
Party	Candidate	Votes	%
Republican	Cindi Duchow (incumbent)		100.0%
Write-in			
Total votes			100.0
Republican hold			

=== District 98 ===
Incumbent Republican Jim Piwowarczyk ran for re-election. He faced Democrat Matt Philibert in the general election.

District 98 general election (unofficial results)
Party	Candidate	Votes	%
Republican	Jim Piwowarczyk (incumbent)	21,681	67.1%
Democratic	Matt Philibert	10,617	32.9%
Write-in			
Total votes			100.0
Republican hold			

=== District 99 ===
Incumbent Republican Barbara Dittrich ran for re-election unopposed.

District 99 general election (unofficial results)
Party	Candidate	Votes	%
Republican	Barbara Dittrich (incumbent)		100.0%
Write-in			
Total votes			100.0
Republican hold			

== See also ==
- Redistricting in Wisconsin
  - Clarke v. Wisconsin Elections Commission
- 2026 Wisconsin elections
  - 2026 Wisconsin gubernatorial election
  - 2026 Wisconsin Attorney General election
  - 2026 Wisconsin Senate election
  - 2026 United States House of Representatives elections in Wisconsin
- 2026 United States elections
- Elections in Wisconsin
- Wisconsin State Assembly
