= Anthony Phillips (Wisconsin politician) =

American politician

Member of the Wisconsin State Assembly from the 56th district
- member-elect
- Assumed office January 4, 2027
- Preceded by: Dave Murphy

Personal details
- Party: Republican
- Website: Campaign website

Anthony Phillips is an American politician. A member of the Republican Party, he is the member-elect of the Wisconsin State Assembly for the 56th district. He was elected at the 2026 election.
