= Kevin David Petersen =

American politician (born 1964)

Kevin Petersen

Speaker pro tempore of the Wisconsin Assembly
- Incumbent
- Assumed office January 3, 2023
- Preceded by: Tyler August

Member of the Wisconsin State Assembly
- Incumbent
- Assumed office January 6, 2025
- Preceded by: Lee Snodgrass
- Succeeded by: Kevin Krentz (elect)
- Constituency: 57th district
- In office January 4, 2007 – January 6, 2025
- Preceded by: Jean Hundertmark
- Succeeded by: Karen DeSanto
- Constituency: 40th district

Personal details
- Born: December 14, 1964 (age 61) Waupaca, Wisconsin, U.S.
- Party: Republican
- Education: University of New Mexico (BS)
- Website: State Assembly website

Military service
- Allegiance: United States
- Branch/service: United States Navy
- Years of service: 1983–1994 (active); 1994–2008 (reserve)
- Unit: United States Navy Reserve
- Battles/wars: Gulf War

Kevin David Petersen (born December 14, 1964) is an American small business owner and Republican politician from Waupaca County, Wisconsin. He is the speaker pro tempore of the Wisconsin State Assembly, since 2023, and has served in the Assembly since 2007. He represents Wisconsin's 57th Assembly district since 2025 and previously represented the 40th Assembly district from 2007 to 2025.

== Biography ==
Petersen was born in Waupaca, Wisconsin, and graduated from Waupaca High School in 1983. After graduation, he served in the U.S. Navy in submarine service from 1983 to 1994. Petersen received a Bachelor of Science degree in mechanical engineering from the University of New Mexico in 1989. After leaving the U.S. Navy in 1994, Petersen remained with the U.S. Navy Reserve until 2008.

Petersen served as a Town of Dayton supervisor from 2001 to 2007. He won a three-way primary in 2006 to become the Republican candidate for Wisconsin State Assembly in the 40th district and went on to narrowly defeat Democrat Dan Naylor in the general election. He is currently in his 8th term and has served as Assistant Majority Leader since 2021.

Petersen announced in March 2026 that he would not run for re-election in the 2026 election.

== Electoral history ==
=== Wisconsin Assembly, 40th district (2006–2022) ===
Year	Election	Date	Elected				Defeated				Total	Plurality
2006	Primary	Sep. 12	Kevin David Petersen	Republican	3,563	64.20%	Andrew David Lorge	Rep.	1,295	23.33%	5,550	2,268
2006	Primary	Sep. 12	Kevin David Petersen	Republican	3,563	64.20%	Hyde H. Murray	Rep.	690	12.43%	5,550	2,268
2006	General	Nov. 7	Kevin David Petersen	Republican	10,430	52.63%	Dan Naylor	Dem.	9,380	47.34%	19,816	900
2008	General	Nov. 4	Kevin David Petersen (inc)	Republican	14,741	58.29%	Kevin M. Huehl	Dem.	10,537	41.67%	25,289	4,204
2010	General	Nov. 2	Kevin David Petersen (inc)	Republican	12,749	69.13%	Jon Baltmanis	Dem.	5,682	30.81%	18,442	7,067
2012	General	Nov. 6	Kevin Petersen (inc)	Republican	21,127	98.71%	--Unopposed--				21,403	20,851
2014	General	Nov. 4	Kevin Petersen (inc)	Republican	18,424	98.96%	--Unopposed--				18,617	18,231
2016	General	Nov. 8	Kevin Petersen (inc)	Republican	17,866	64.55%	Dmitri Martin	Dem.	9,801	35.41%	27,678	8,065
2018	General	Nov. 6	Kevin Petersen (inc)	Republican	15,794	64.32%	Erin Tracy	Dem.	8,759	35.67%	24,555	7,035
2020	General	Nov. 3	Kevin Petersen (inc)	Republican	21,902	69.38%	Deb Silvers	Dem.	9,654	30.58%	31,568	12,248
2022	General	Nov. 8	Kevin Petersen (inc)	Republican	19,361	75.29%	Henry Fries	Ind.	6,296	24.48%	25,716	13,065

=== Wisconsin Assembly, 57th district (2024) ===
Year	Election	Date	Elected				Defeated				Total	Plurality
2024	Primary	Aug. 13	Kevin Petersen	Republican	6,156	62.97%	Duane Wilson	Rep.	3,606	36.89%	9,776	2,550
2024	General	Nov. 5	Kevin Petersen	Republican	22,044	62.31%	Ruth Caves	Dem.	10,048	28.40%	35,377	11,996
2024	General	Nov. 5	Kevin Petersen	Republican	22,044	62.31%	Dylan Testin	Ind.	3,261	9.22%	35,377	11,996

Wisconsin State Assembly
Preceded by Tyler August	Speaker pro tempore of the Wisconsin Assembly; 2023–present	Incumbent
