= Jeremiah Fredrickson =

American politician

Member-elect of the Wisconsin State Assembly from the 92nd district
- Assuming office January 2027
- Succeeding: Clint Moses

Personal details
- Born: 1976 or 1977 (age 49–50)
- Party: Democratic
- Education: University of Wisconsin–River Falls; St. Mary's University of Minnesota

Jeremiah Fredrickson (born 1976 or 1977) is an American politician, farmer, and former teacher. A Democrat, he is a member-elect of the Wisconsin State Assembly, representing the 92nd district.

== Biography ==
Fredrickson graduated from the University of Wisconsin–River Falls in 2001 with a degree in agriculture, and from Saint Mary's University of Minnesota in 2010 with a Master's degree. He taught agriculture and worked as an athletics coach in Elk Mound, Wisconsin for 16 years. He owns a fish farm south of Menomonie, Wisconsin.

Fredrickson ran for office after a former student of his suggested the idea to him. He defeated Republican incumbent Clint Moses in the 2026 Wisconsin State Assembly election.
