= Amy Zimmerman =

American politician

Member-elect of the Wisconsin State Assembly from the 13th district
- Member-elect
- Assuming office January 4, 2027
- Succeeding: Robyn Vining

Personal details
- Born: Amy Elizabeth Haffner
- Party: Democratic
- Spouse: Joshua M. Zimmerman (m. 2016)
- Children: 2
- Education: Marquette University
- Profession: project manager
- Website: Campaign website

Amy Elizabeth Zimmerman (née Haffner) is an American project management professional, small business owner, and Democratic politician from Brookfield, Wisconsin. She is a member-elect of the Wisconsin State Assembly, and will represent Wisconsin's 13th Assembly district in the 108th Wisconsin Legislature (2027–2028). She currently serves as a member of Brookfield's Parks & Recreation Commission.

== Early life and career ==
Amy Zimmerman was born Amy Haffner. She moved to Wisconsin to attend Marquette University; she graduated with her bachelor's degree in business administration in 2010. She remained in Milwaukee and worked as in IT project management for Robert W. Baird & Co. for several years.

In 2018, she moved to nearby Brookfield, Wisconsin, in Waukesha County, and was employed as a program manager at Trissential Business Management Consulting. She is also co-owner of Brown Dog Gadgets, a small business started by her husband.

== Political career ==
Zimmerman became involved in local government, through school board elections; in 2022, she was appointed to the city's Parks and Recreation Commission. Her political activity increased as she found motivation in the effort to overturn Wisconsin's gerrymandered legislative maps during the 2023 Wisconsin Supreme Court election.

In July 2025, Brookfield's state representative, Robyn Vining, announced that she would run for Wisconsin Senate, leaving an open seat in the 13th Assembly district. Two weeks after Vining's announcement, Zimmerman announced that she would seek the Democratic Party nomination to succeed Vining in the Wisconsin State Assembly. In her announcement, Zimmerman said that she intended to prioritize school funding, working family needs, healthcare, and small business. During the campaign, Zimmerman self-identified as progressive.

Zimmerman faced a competitive primary election against Wauwatosa attorney David Sanchez, a former law clerk for Wisconsin Supreme Court justice Rebecca Dallet. A third candidate, Elmbrook School Board member Wes Sylla, withdrew before the primary. During the primary campaign, Zimmerman associated herself with the healthcare plan being promoted by Democratic gubernatorial candidate Kelda Roys, to effectively create a state health insurance public option by raising eligibility for BadgerCare and enabling all Wisconsin residents to buy into the state employee health plan. She also said she would support a gradual phase-out of the state's costly school voucher program. On the hot topic of AI data centers, Zimmerman said she would support a moratorium on large "hyperscale" data centers, but would carve out small traditional data centers with lower water and energy needs. Zimmerman narrowly prevailed over Sanchez in the August 11 primary, receiving 51% of the vote.

Zimmerman won the general election in a landslide, defeating Republican Mike Morgan, and carrying 62% of the vote. She is set to take office in January 2027.

== Personal life and family ==
Amy Haffner took the last name Zimmerman when she married former school teacher Joshua Zimmerman in August 2016. They reside in Brookfield and have two young children.

Zimmerman is a member of the Unitarian Universalist church.

== Electoral history ==
=== Wisconsin Assembly (2026) ===
Year	Election	Date	Elected				Defeated				Total	Plurality
2026	Primary	Aug. 11	Amy Zimmerman	Democratic	6,409	51.12%	David Sanchez	Dem.	6,118	48.80%	12,537	291
2026	General	Nov. 3	Amy Zimmerman	Democratic	21,117	62.79%	Mike Morgan	Rep.	12,515	37.21%	33,632	8,602
