= Bill Oemichen =

21st-century American politician

Member-elect of the Wisconsin State Assembly from the 50th district
- Assuming office January 2027
- Succeeding: Jenna Jacobson

President of the New Glarus Board of Education
- Incumbent
- Assumed office April 2020
- Preceded by: Kari Morrison

Personal details
- Born: 1959 or 1960 (age 66–67) Minnesota, U.S.
- Party: Democratic
- Spouse: Mary Anne Colovic (m. 1987)
- Children: William, Amy
- Education: Carleton College (B.A.); University of Wisconsin Law School (J.D.); University of Saskatchewan
- Profession: Lawyer
- Website: Campaign website

William Lee Oemichen (born 1959/1960) is an American lawyer, public administrator, and Democratic politician from New Glarus, Wisconsin. He is a member-elect of the Wisconsin State Assembly, and will represent Wisconsin's 50th Assembly district in the 108th Wisconsin Legislature (2027–2028). He also currently serves as a member of the New Glarus Board of Education, and has served as president of the board since 2020. Early in his political career, he also served on the Board of Supervisors of St. Croix County, Wisconsin, from 1989 to 1996.

He previously served in high-level state government positions in Wisconsin and Minnesota, serving as counsel and deputy commissioner in the Minnesota Department of Agriculture from 1989 to 1996, then serving as Wisconsin's chief consumer protection official in the Wisconsin Department of Agriculture, Trade and Consumer Protection from 1996 to 2001. From 2001 to 2015, he worked as president and C.E.O. of the Cooperative Network, an organization supporting all forms of cooperative associations in Wisconsin and Minnesota. He returned briefly to state government in 2016, leading the Office of Preparedness & Emergency Health Care in the Wisconsin Department of Health Services.

Oemichen also held several academic roles, serving as a public policy fellow and adjunct professor at the Humphrey School of Public Affairs. Since 2023, he has also served as a professor of practice on law and local government for the University of Wisconsin–Extension, and serves as a senior researcher at the University of Wisconsin Law School and the College of Agricultural and Life Sciences at the University of Wisconsin–Madison.

== Early life and education ==
Bill Oemichen was raised in Vadnais Heights, Minnesota, and graduated from White Bear Lake Area High School. He went on to attend Carleton College, where he earned his bachelor's degree in 1982, majoring in economics with a concentration in science, technology, and public policy. He continued his education at the University of Wisconsin Law School, and earned his J.D. in 1986.

== Political career ==
After completing law school, Oemichen returned to Minnesota and was employed as counsel at the Minnesota Department of Agriculture, working as a top aide to controversial populist state agriculture commissioner James W. Nichols. In 1990, Oemichen became an active volunteer for the political campaign of his former Carleton professor, Paul Wellstone, who was making a longshot bid for election to the United States Senate. Wellstone won his election, but Democratic governor Rudy Perpich was defeated by Republican Arne Carlson. Oemichen's boss, James W. Nichols, was replaced by Republican appointee Elton Redalen, but Redalen decided to retain Oemichen as department counsel. Under Redalen's successor, Gene Hugoson, Oemichen was promoted to deputy commissioner of the department in 1995; at the time Hugoson praised Oemichen as a nationally recognized expert in food safety and dairy pricing policy. In that role, he also chaired the Minnesota Rural Finance Authority.

While working for the Minnesota Department of Agriculture, Oemichen and his family moved across the state border into western Wisconsin, residing near Hudson, Wisconsin. While residing there, he won his first elected offices, when he was elected to four consecutive terms on the Board of Supervisors of St. Croix County, Wisconsin; he also served with the county's Economic Development Corporation.

A year later, Oemichen was hired by the Wisconsin Department of Agriculture, Trade and Consumer Protection, to serve as administrator of the Division of Trade and Consumer Protection. In taking the job, Oemichen said that the deputy commissioner role in Minnesota had been too bureaucratic for his liking—focused more on department budget and personnel—and he wanted to get back to working in policy. He and his family moved to the village of Waunakee, Wisconsin, near Wisconsin's capitol city, Madison; he also resigned his seats on the St. Croix County Board of Supervisors and the St. Croix County Economic Development Corporation.

One of his first tasks at the Wisconsin agency was to oversee the consolidation of the state's consumer protection investigation and enforcement operations into his division, in accordance with recently-passed legislation; this included the transfer of several staff and responsibilities from the Wisconsin Department of Justice—Oemichen said that he was unaware when accepting this job that these responsibilities had been transferred by the Legislature from Justice to Agriculture in order to remove the authority from Wisconsin's assertive Democratic attorney general, Jim Doyle. During his first several months in office, Doyle and his allies delivered scathing criticism of Oemichen's enforcement agency as ineffective or too slow to act. Despite the early friction, Oemichen and Doyle developed a collaborative working relationship as Oemichen's division developed investigations and Doyle's department handled prosecutions. Over the next four years, Oemichen was almost constantly in the Wisconsin newspapers discussing various consumer protection investigations, fraud alerts, and enforcement actions.

In August 2001, Oemichen resigned from state government to accept a role as senior vice president of the Wisconsin Federation of Cooperatives and the Minnesota Association of Cooperatives. Coinciding with his departure from state government, Oemichen and his family moved from Waunakee to New Glarus, Wisconsin, in Green County. After just a year in his new role, Oemichen was named president and C.E.O. of WFC/MAC—the organization would later change its name to the Cooperative Network. In this role, he was active in lobbying the legislature and state government.

He retired from the Cooperative Network in 2015, but shortly after returned for another brief stint in state government, working as director of the Office of Preparedness and Emergency Health Care in the Wisconsin Department of Health Services from 2016 to 2018.

Oemichen returned to local office in 2019 when he was elected to the New Glarus School Board. After a year on the board, the members elected him president of the school board in 2020. He was re-elected to the board in 2022 and 2025, and has served as president of the board throughout those years. Since 2023, he has also served as a professor of practice on law and local government for the University of Wisconsin–Extension, and serves as a senior researcher at the University of Wisconsin Law School and the College of Agricultural and Life Sciences at the University of Wisconsin–Madison.

In July 2025, incumbent state representative Jenna Jacobson announced that she would run for Wisconsin Senate, leaving an open seat in the 50th district of the Wisconsin State Assembly. The 50th district comprises all of Green County and part of southwest Dane County, and is considered a Democratic leaning seat. Oemichen entered the race to succeed her in the spring of 2026. He was the second of three candidates to enter the Democratic Party primary field; also seeking the nomination were Josh Mittness of Monroe and registered nurse Bryna Caves. Caves and Mittness favored a statewide moratorium on AI data center construction, Oemichen said he would only favor a moratorium if it was necessary to get proper regulation enacted. Oemichen said he was compelled to run for the Assembly after serving on the school board and dealing with the equalization formula, which forced many school boards around the state to frequently use referenda to maintain basic operations. Oemichen was endorsed by nearby state representatives Mike Bare and Clinton Anderson; Mittness was endorsed by former U.S. senator Russ Feingold, who had been a colleague of Mittness' grandfather Lewis T. Mittness in the state legislature. Oemichen won the primary with 50% of the vote, and went on to defeat Republican Jon Aleckson by a wide margin in the general election. He is set to take office in January 2027.

== Personal life and family ==
Bill Oemichen and his twin sister were the eldest of five children born to William P. Oemichen and his second wife Lucylee (née Conger). The elder William Oemichen was born into a dairy farming family in Sheboygan County, Wisconsin; his career was largely shaped by his experience of the agricultural devastation caused by the 1930s Dust Bowl. He went on to serve 32 years with the U.S. Soil Conservation Service in Minnesota, working to train farmers on soil and water conservation best practices. After retiring from the SCS, he continued to offer his expertise to conservation organizations in Minnesota. The elder Oemichen's notoriety and reputation among the Minnesota farming community likely contributed to Bill's early career opportunities in the state agriculture department.

Bill Oemichen married Mary Anne Colovic in 1987, and have now been married for nearly 30 years. Mary Anne is executive director of a non-profit serving seniors and people with disabilities in the New Glarus area.

Bill and Mary Anne Oemichen reside in New Glarus; they have two adult children. Their son Will represented New Glarus for two terms on the Green County Board of Supervisors; their daughter is a small business owner.

== Electoral history ==
=== New Glarus school board (2019, 2022, 2025) ===
Year	Election	Date	Elected				Defeated				Total	Plurality
2019	General	Apr. 2	Debra Fairbanks (inc)	Nonpartisan	674	36.83%	Steve Wicklund	Non.	565	30.87%	1,830	26
2019	General	Apr. 2	Bill Oemichen	Nonpartisan	591	32.30%	Steve Wicklund	Non.	565	30.87%	1,830	26
2022	General	Apr. 5	Bill Oemichen (inc)	Nonpartisan	819	31.22%	Jenny Julseth	Non.	606	23.10%	2,623	4
2022	General	Apr. 5	Ron Roesslein	Nonpartisan	610	23.26%	Alex Bean	Non.	588	22.42%	2,623	4
2025	General	Apr. 5	Bill Oemichen (inc)	Nonpartisan	131	55.74%	--unopposed--				235	
2025	General	Apr. 5	Ron Roesslein (inc)	Nonpartisan	99	42.13%	--unopposed--				235	

=== Wisconsin Assembly (2026) ===
Year	Election	Date	Elected				Defeated				Total	Plurality
2026	Primary	Aug. 11	Bill Oemichen	Democratic	5,058	50.47%	Josh Mittness	Dem.	3,089	30.82%	10,022	1,969
2026	Primary	Aug. 11	Bill Oemichen	Democratic	5,058	50.47%	Bryna Caves	Dem.	1,869	18.65%	10,022	1,969
2026	General	Nov. 3	Bill Oemichen	Democratic	17,472	61.75%	Jon Aleckson	Rep.	10,817	38.23%	28,296	6,655
