= Bradley Petersen =

American politician

Member of the Wisconsin State Assembly from the 59th district
- member-elect
- Assumed office January 4, 2027
- Preceded by: Robert Brooks

Personal details
- Party: Republican
- Website: Campaign website

Bradley Petersen is an American politician. A member of the Republican Party, he is the member-elect of the Wisconsin State Assembly for the 59th district. He was elected at the 2026 election.
