= Rick Stacey =

21st-century American politician

Member-elect of the Wisconsin State Assembly from the 33rd district
- Assuming office January 2027
- Succeeding: Robin Vos

Chairman of the Board of Supervisors of Walworth County, Wisconsin
- Incumbent
- Assumed office April 19, 2022
- Preceded by: Nancy Russell

Personal details
- Party: Republican
- Spouses: Janell Doyscher (div. 2004); Lisa Taubert (m. 2020)
- Children: 2
- Occupation: Farmer
- Website: Campaign website

Richard John Stacey Jr. (born August 1966) is an American farmer and Republican politician from Walworth County, Wisconsin. He is a member-elect of the Wisconsin State Assembly, and will represent Wisconsin's 33rd Assembly district in the 108th Wisconsin Legislature (2027–2028). He currently serves as chairman of the Board of Supervisors of Walworth County.

== Biography ==
Rick Stacey was raised around his family's farm in rural western Racine County, Wisconsin. He graduated from Waterford Union High School in 1984. He worked with his family to operate their farm for cash crops and vegetables, and sold their produce at a roadside stand near Waterford, Wisconsin, on Wisconsin Highway 36. Rick established Stacey's Hay and Straw to sell their hay products to retail garden centers around the area.

In 1987, Stacey expanded the family land holdings by purchasing 361 acres of farmland in the town of East Troy, and incorporating as Stacey Farms. With the new farm, he established the recreational Stacey Farms Corn Maze and Pumpkin Farm.

Stacey grew frustrated through interactions with the local government, and in 2004 he decided to run for county board. He won the election and went on to serve continuously on the board up to the present. In 2022, he was elected chairman of the board of supervisors, and was re-elected in 2024 and 2026.

In February 2026, Assembly speaker Robin Vos announced he would not run for re-election, creating an open seat in the state's 33rd Assembly district. Stacey decided to seek the Republican Party nomination to succeed Vos. He faced a contested primary election against Union Grove village president Steve Wicklund. The two largely agreed on policy positions, Stacey prevailed with about 54% of the vote. He won by a large majority in the general election, defeating Democrat Maria Elena Bisabarros. Stacey is set to take office in January 2027.

== Personal life and family ==
Rick Stacey was the elder of two children born to Richard Stacey Sr. and his wife Carol (née Schumacher).

Rick Stacey has been married twice. His first wife was Janell Doyscher; they divorced in 2004. In 2020 he married fellow divorcee, Lisa Sweet (née Taubert). They are parents to two adult children, and they reside just outside the village of East Troy, Wisconsin.

== Electoral history ==
=== Wisconsin Assembly (2026) ===
Year	Election	Date	Elected				Defeated				Total	Plurality
2026	Primary	Aug. 11	Rick Stacey	Republican	3,950	54.42%	Steve Wicklund	Rep.	3,301	45.47%	7,259	649
2026	General	Nov. 3	Rick Stacey	Republican	17,160	62.34%	Maria Elena Bisabarros	Dem.	10,367	37.66%	27,527	6,793
