= Ben Gruber (politician) =

American politician (born 1983)

Member-elect of the Wisconsin State Assembly from the 51st district
- Assuming office January 4, 2027
- Succeeding: Todd Novak

Personal details
- Born: 1983 (age 42–43) Arena, Wisconsin, U.S.
- Party: Democratic
- Website: Campaign website

Benjamin William Gruber (born 1983) is an American Democratic politician and conservation warden from Arena, Wisconsin. He is a member-elect of the Wisconsin State Assembly, and will represent Wisconsin's 51st Assembly district in the 108th Wisconsin Legislature (2027).

== Early life and career ==
Gruber was born in 1983 in Arena, Wisconsin, and spent his childhood working several farming jobs. He also attended River Valley High School. Following his education he went into public service, working as an EMT, firefighter, and paramedic. Later on serving as a conservation warden for the Wisconsin Department of Natural Resources.

In 2024, the DNR became embroiled in controversy regarding prior reports from 2020 that female recruits were singled out for harassment by trainers. Gruber, then president of AFSCME Local 1215, was fired from his position as warden after speaking out on the allegations. However, Gruber later sued the Department, and was reinstated.

== Political career ==
Gruber announced his campaign in January 2026, to face incumbent Republican Todd Novak. He defeated Novak by an 11-point margin on election day.

== Electoral history ==
=== Wisconsin Assembly (2026) ===
Wisconsin Assembly, 51st District Election, 2026
Party	Candidate	Votes	%	±%
General Election, November 3, 2026
Democratic	Ben Gruber	14,863	54.61%	+6.34pp
Republican	Todd Novak (incumbent)	11,907	43.75%	−7.91pp
American Solidarity	Nathan Tataje	447	1.64%	+1.64pp
	Scattering			
Plurality		2,956	10.86%	+7.48pp
Total votes		27,217	100.0%	-20.49%
Democratic gain from Republican				
