= Sylvia Ortiz-Velez =

21st century American politician

Member of the Wisconsin State Assembly from the 8th district
- Incumbent
- Assumed office January 4, 2021
- Preceded by: JoCasta Zamarripa

Member of the Milwaukee County Board of Supervisors from the 12th district
- In office April 2018 – April 2022
- Preceded by: Peggy West
- Succeeded by: Juan Martinez

Personal details
- Born: Milwaukee, Wisconsin, U.S.
- Party: Democratic
- Education: University of Wisconsin, Milwaukee (BA)
- Website: County website; Campaign website

Sylvia Ortiz-Velez is an American real estate broker and Democratic politician from Milwaukee, Wisconsin. She is a member of the Wisconsin State Assembly, representing Wisconsin's 8th Assembly district since 2021. She previously served on the Milwaukee County Board of Supervisors from 2018 until 2022.

In September 2025 Ortiz-Velez quit the Assembly Democratic caucus after a heated disagreement in August in which she allegedly threatened to shoot three of her colleagues. She was charged with misdemeanor disorderly conduct in February 2026 over the incident, and pled no contest to the charge.

== Early life and education ==
Sylvia Ortiz-Velez was born and raised in Milwaukee, Wisconsin. She earned a B.A. in political science from the University of Wisconsin–Milwaukee. She worked as a real estate broker for several years in Milwaukee before being elected to the County Board.

== Political career ==
In 2012, Ortiz-Velez made her first attempt at election to the Milwaukee County Board of Supervisors, challenging four term incumbent supervisor Peggy A. West (then going by the name "Peggy Romo West"). West prevailed in the spring election with 55.71%. Ortiz-Velez challenged West again in 2018, however, and this time defeated her, taking 57% of the vote. Ortiz-Velez was one of several candidates to benefit from the support of then-County Executive Chris Abele in his attempts to reshape the County Board in 2018. She was re-elected without opposition in April 2020.

During her time on the County Board, she was a member of the Intergovernmental Relations Committee, the Judiciary, Safety and General Services Committee, and the Transportation, Public Works and Transit Committee. She was also a member of the Mitchell Park Domes Task Force, tasked with developing a long-term plan for the 50-year-old nature conservatory—Ortiz-Velez committed to preserving the domes for future generations in her campaign platform. In addition to her service on the County Board, Ortiz-Velez serves on the advisory board of the United Migrant Opportunity Services (UMOS).

In the spring 2020 election, incumbent state representative JoCasta Zamarripa was elected to the Milwaukee Common Council and announced she would not run for another term in the Wisconsin State Assembly. On April 14, 2020, Ortiz-Velez formally announced her candidacy for Zamarripa's assembly seat. In the primary, she faced JoAnna Bautch, the sister of outgoing Assemblymember JoCasta Zamarripa, and the Wisconsin Director of Citizen Action. In the primary, Ortiz-Velez supported expanding BadgerCare (Wisconsin's Medicaid program) and legalization of medical marijuana. Despite trailing in the early in-person vote returns, Ortiz Velez narrowly won the primary, taking 53% of the vote after absentee ballots were counted. Ortiz-Velez earned 78% of the vote in the general election, defeating Republican Angel Sanchez.

=== Caucus split ===
In September 2025, Ortiz-Velez quit the Assembly Democratic caucus after months of conflict with other members, and was then briefly banned from the Wisconsin State Capitol after she allegedly threatened to shoot three Democratic colleagues. Ortiz-Velez had previously split from the Democratic caucus on several high-profile votes since joining the Assembly in 2021; one of her first major floor speeches opposed Democratic redistricting efforts. Recently, Ortiz-Velez has been in a heated feud with fellow Milwaukee representative Priscilla Prado over the Legislature's new Hispanic Legislative Caucus— which Ortiz-Velez declined to join. Ortiz-Velez also plans to testify on an upcoming bill about local executive emergency powers to accuse Milwaukee County executive David Crowley of exceeding his authority in requesting county officials to disclose their COVID-19 vaccination status.

=== 2026 election ===
Ortiz-Velez ran for re-election in 2026, but lost renomination by a wide margin to progressive challenger Ismael Luna.

== Personal life and family ==
Ortiz-Velez is the daughter of a former evangelical minister; she has seven siblings.

== Electoral history ==
=== Milwaukee County Board (2012) ===
Year	Election	Date	Elected				Defeated				Total	Plurality
2012	General	Apr. 3	Peggy Romo West (inc)	Nonpartisan	1,278	55.71%	Sylvia Ortiz	Non.	1,003	43.72%	2,294	275

=== Milwaukee County Board (2018, 2020) ===
Year	Election	Date	Elected				Defeated				Total	Plurality
2018	General	Apr. 3	Sylvia Ortiz-Velez	Nonpartisan	815	57.11%	Peggy West (inc)	Non.	602	42.19%	1,427	213
2020	General	Apr. 7	Sylvia Ortiz-Velez	Nonpartisan	2,025	98.93%	--Unopposed--				2,047	2,003

=== Wisconsin Assembly (2020–2026) ===
Year	Election	Date	Elected				Defeated				Total	Plurality
2020	Primary	Aug. 11	Sylvia Ortiz-Velez	Democratic	901	53.06%	JoAnna Bautch	Dem.	793	46.70%	1,698	108
2020	General	Nov. 3	Sylvia Ortiz-Velez	Democratic	8,914	78.70%	Angel C. Sanchez	Rep.	2,375	20.97%	11,326	6,539
2022	General	Nov. 8	Sylvia Ortiz-Velez (inc)	Democratic	6,573	98.10%	--Unopposed--				6,700	6,446
2024	Primary	Aug. 13	Sylvia Ortiz-Velez (inc)	Democratic	1,430	80.61%	Enrique Murguia	Dem.	336	18.94%	1,774	1,094
2024	General	Nov. 5	Sylvia Ortiz-Velez (inc)	Democratic	10,987	97.97%	--Unopposed--				11,215	10,759
2026	Primary	Aug. 11	Ismael Luna	Democratic	2,201	70.25%	Sylvia Ortiz-Velez (inc)	Dem.	928	29.62%	3,133	1,273

Wisconsin State Assembly
Preceded by JoCasta Zamarripa	Member of the Wisconsin State Assembly from the 8th district January 4, 2021 – present	Incumbent
