= Ismael Luna =

21st-century American politician (born 2000)

Member-elect of the Wisconsin State Assembly from the 8th district
- Assuming office January 2027
- Succeeding: Sylvia Ortiz-Velez

Personal details
- Born: 2000 (age 25–26) Kenosha, Wisconsin, U.S.
- Party: Democratic
- Education: Cardinal Stritch University (B.S.); George Washington University (M.P.P.)
- Website: Campaign website

Ismael Luna (born 2000) is an American nonprofit professional, community organizer, and Democratic politician from Milwaukee, Wisconsin. He is a member-elect of the Wisconsin State Assembly, and will represent Wisconsin's 8th Assembly district in the 108th Wisconsin Legislature (2027–2028). He was elected after defeating the previous Democratic incumbent, Sylvia Ortiz-Velez, in a primary challenge.

== Early life and education ==
Ismael Luna was born in Kenosha, Wisconsin. Shortly after his birth, his family moved to the south side of Milwaukee, Wisconsin, where Luna was raised and educated. His father was deported when he was a child, and his mother remarried; Luna was put out of his stepfather's home at age 14 and struggled with homelessness, but received support from neighbors and community groups. Luna began working to support himself, and by age 16 he was a restaurant server and assistant manager at La Canoa Mexican restaurant.

Despite his difficult home life, Luna excelled in school; he attended Milwaukee Public Schools and graduated from Riverside University High School. He did not know how to apply for college, but he knew friends who were attending Milwaukee's Cardinal Stritch University, and he figured out how to apply online. While attending college, he purchased his first home, using money he had saved from his restaurant work. He became the first member of his family to graduate from college, earning his bachelor's degree in political science in 2022. He continued to work at the Mexican restaurant through his college years, and was also active in local community volunteer organizations.

In 2023, he went on to attend George Washington University, in Washington, D.C., where he earned his master's in public policy in 2025. While residing in Washington, D.C., Luna became active in government service, working as an intern in the office of U.S. senator Tammy Baldwin (D–Wisconsin), and then working as an intern at the U.S. State Department in the fall of 2024.

After completing his master's education, he returned to Milwaukee and was employed as a case manager at the Cathedral Center—a nonsectarian emergency shelter. With the money he was able to save from his employment, he purchased two more properties in Milwaukee.

== Political career ==
In September 2025, Democratic state representative Sylvia Ortiz-Velez—who represented the 8th Assembly district, comprising the heart of Milwaukee's south side—quit the Assembly Democratic caucus after months of internal conflict with other members of the party. Even before her public split with the caucus, Ortiz-Velez had frustrated state and local Democrats by siding with Republicans on critical topics including the 2025 budget and the 2024 redistricting. Luna decided to launch a primary challenge against Ortiz-Velez in the 2026 Democratic Party primary, announcing his campaign in February 2026. Luna was endorsed by several important organizations in his primary campaign, including the Fair Wisconsin, Citizen Action of Wisconsin, Wisconsin Progress, and the Wisconsin Laborers' District Council.

Luna won the Democratic primary by a wide margin, receiving about 70% of the vote. Ortiz-Velez challenged the results with the Wisconsin Elections Commission, alleging that Luna was not a resident of the district, but the Elections Commission dismissed her complaints, finding nothing that rose to the level of reasonable suspicion. Ortiz-Velez attempted a write-in campaign against Luna in the general election, but did not muster significant support. Luna easily won the general election in the heavily Democratic district, and will take office in January 2027.

== Personal life and family ==
Ismael Luna is the fourth of five children born to Mexican American parents with mixed immigration status. His father worked in construction, but was deported back to Mexico around 2010, leaving his mother to support Luna and his siblings. His mother remarried, but Luna described a difficult home life with his stepfather, who eventually kicked him out of their home at age 14. Luna is also a survivor of child sexual abuse, committed by a family member.

Ismael Luna identifies as gay and is a member of the Catholic church.

== Electoral history ==
=== Wisconsin Assembly (2026) ===
Year	Election	Date	Elected				Defeated				Total	Plurality
2026	Primary	Aug. 11	Ismael Luna	Democratic	2,201	70.25%	Sylvia Ortiz-Velez (inc)	Dem.	928	29.62%	3,133	1,273
2026	General	Nov. 3	Ismael Luna	Democratic	8,039	85.53%	Angel Sanchez	Rep.	1,327	14.12%	9,399	6,712
