= Dina Nina Martinez-Rutherford =

American politician and comedian, born 1970

Member-elect of the Wisconsin State Assembly from the 76th district
- Assuming office January 4, 2027
- Succeeding: Francesca Hong

Member of the Madison Common Council from the 15th district
- Incumbent
- Assumed office April 18, 2023
- Preceded by: Grant Foster

Personal details
- Born: May 1970 (age 56)
- Party: Democratic
- Website: Official website Campaign website

Dina Nina Martinez-Rutherford (born 1970) is an American comedian and Democratic politician from Madison, Wisconsin. She is a member-elect of the Wisconsin State Assembly, and will represent Wisconsin's 76th Assembly district in the 108th Wisconsin Legislature (2027–2028). She currently serves as a member of the Madison Common Council, since 2023. She is the first openly transgender woman and second openly transgender person to be elected to public office in Wisconsin, and the first openly trans person to be elected to the state's legislature.

== Early life and comedy career ==
Born in May 1970, Martinez-Rutherford grew up in Texas. In her early adulthood, she was a small group pastor for non-denominational evangelical churches. She moved to California in the early 2000s, where she began her career as a stand-up comic, and began her gender transition in 2007.

Martinez-Rutherford moved to Madison, Wisconsin in 2012. In 2015, she founded Lady Laughs Comedy, a production company that runs an annual comedy festival in Madison and offers classes in stand-up comedy.

== Early political career ==
In 2023, after seeing multiple anti-LGBTQ hate crimes including the Pulse nightclub shooting and the Club Q shooting in Colorado, Martinez-Rutherford decided to run for office. She announced her candidacy for alder on the Common Council, in district 15 in the Willy Street, Marquette, and Eastmorland neighborhoods. On April 4, 2023, she was elected to the council by a narrow 54-vote margin, becoming the first openly transgender woman elected to public office in Wisconsin. Since 2023, the city has raised the transgender pride flag over City Hall on Transgender Day of Visibility each year, an initiative started by Martinez-Rutherford.

Martinez-Rutherford launched a re-election campaign in the 2025 spring election. Prior to Election Day, she withdrew from the race to recover from a surgery, but her name remained on the ballot due to state statute. Following her withdrawal, she endorsed her opponent, Ryan Koglin. Despite her withdrawal, she won 51% of the vote on April 1, 2025, then decided to accept her re-election, remaining in office.

== State legislature ==
In 2025, state representative Francesca Hong—who then represented the east side of the city of Madison in the Wisconsin State Assembly—announced she would forego re-election to run instead for governor of Wisconsin in 2026. This created an open seat in one of the 76th Assembly district. Martinez-Rutherford announced her campaign for Assembly on September 18, 2025, the day after Hong's gubernatorial campaign launch. Four other candidates ultimately jumped into the Democratic primary contest for the overwhelmingly Democratic district, in what became one of the most hotly-contested legislative primaries in the state that year.

Martinez-Rutherford's opponents included former alder and former legislative staffer Juliana Bennett, current legislative staffer Isaia Ben-Ami, local organizer Tony Castañeda, and freelance journalist Zoe Sullivan. All five candidates shared similar policy platforms. Three of the candidates—Bennett, Ben-Ami, and Sullivan—identified as democratic socialists; the Madison chapter of the Democratic Socialists of America endorsed Bennett. At the August 11 primary, Martinez-Rutherford prevailed with 29% of the vote, finishing 502 votes ahead of Bennett. Martinez-Rutherford defeated Republican Nina Chat in the 2026 general election; she will become Wisconsin's first openly transgender state legislator.

== Positions ==
Martinez-Rutherford supports increased funding for the University of Wisconsin System, a moratorium on data centers, and legislation for affordable housing. She opposes school vouchers and has advocated for rolling back Wisconsin's school choice system.

== Electoral history ==
=== Madison Common Council (2023, 2025) ===
Year	Election	Date	Elected				Defeated				Total	Plurality
2023	General	Apr. 3	Dina Nina Martinez-Rutherford	Nonpartisan	3,609	50.08%	Brad Hinkfuss	Non.	3,555	49.33%	7,207	54
2025	General	Apr. 1	Dina Nina Martinez-Rutherford (inc) (withdrawn)	Nonpartisan	3,833	51.16%	Ryan Koglin	Non.	3,614	48.24%	7,492	219

=== Wisconsin Assembly (2026) ===
Year	Election	Date	Elected				Defeated				Total	Plurality
2026	Primary	Aug. 11	Dina Nina Martinez-Rutherford	Democratic	6,170	29.42%	Juliana Bennett	Dem.	5,668	27.03%	20,970	501
2026	Primary	Aug. 11	Dina Nina Martinez-Rutherford	Democratic	6,170	29.42%	Isaia Ben-Ami	Dem.	4,573	21.81%	20,970	501
2026	Primary	Aug. 11	Dina Nina Martinez-Rutherford	Democratic	6,170	29.42%	Tony Castañeda	Dem.	3,213	15.32%	20,970	501
2026	Primary	Aug. 11	Dina Nina Martinez-Rutherford	Democratic	6,170	29.42%	Zoe Sullivan	Dem.	1,313	6.26%	20,970	501
