= Dan J. Bukiewicz =

21st-century American politician

Daniel J. Bukiewicz

Member-elect of the Wisconsin State Assembly from the 21st district
- Assuming office January 2027
- Succeeding: Jessie Rodriguez

9th Mayor of Oak Creek, Wisconsin
- Incumbent
- Assumed office March 8, 2017 (interim until April 3, 2018)
- Preceded by: Ken Gehl (acting); Stephen Scaffidi (elected)

President of the Milwaukee Building and Construction Trades Council
- Incumbent
- Assumed office January 2014
- Preceded by: Lyle Balistreri

Personal details
- Born: January 1965 (age 61) Milwaukee, Wisconsin, U.S.
- Party: Democratic
- Spouse: Carolyn Campbell
- Occupation: Electrician
- Website: Campaign website

Daniel James Bukiewicz (born January 1965) is an American electrician, labor union leader, and Democratic politician from Milwaukee County, Wisconsin. He is the mayor of Oak Creek, Wisconsin, and a member-elect of the Wisconsin State Assembly; he is set to represent Wisconsin's 21st Assembly district in the 108th Wisconsin Legislature (2027–2028). Since 2014, he has also served as president of the Milwaukee Building and Construction Trades Council—a council of labor unions representing 15,000 Milwaukee trades workers.

== Early life and career ==
Dan Bukiewicz was born and raised in Milwaukee, Wisconsin. He attended the Milwaukee Public Schools and graduated from Milwaukee's Alexander Hamilton High School in 1983. After high school, he entered the workforce, and in 1987 became an apprentice electrician with the International Brotherhood of Electrical Workers Local 494. A short time later, he moved to the Milwaukee suburb of Oak Creek, Wisconsin, where he has resided up to the present day. For more than 19 years he worked as an electrical contractor, rising in responsibility and prominence among his union colleagues, before moving from frontline work into union leadership and management positions.

== Political career ==
Through involvement in community volunteer activities, Bukiewicz became interested in local politics. Bukiewicz was elected to the Oak Creek City Council in 2010, and was re-elected three times.

In 2012, he became the business representative for IBEW Local 494, representing his members on contracts, apprenticeships, pensions, grievances, and labor-management relations. Two years later, Bukiewicz was elected president of the Milwaukee Building and Construction Trades Council—a council to coordinate the activity of 18 local unions to ensure fair wages, job security, and strong safety standards across the region's commercial and industrial building sectors—making him one of the most influential labor leaders in the Milwaukee area.

In early 2017, Oak Creek mayor Stephen Scaffidi resigned to pursue a career as a broadcaster on Milwaukee's popular WTMJ (AM) radio station. City council president Ken Gehl became the immediate acting mayor on Scaffidi's resignation, but the city council would vote to appoint an interim mayor to serve the remainder of the term. Bukiewicz—then a member of the city council—had already been planning a run for mayor in 2018, and announced immediately that he was interested in the role. On March 7, the city council voted and selected Bukiewicz to fill out the remaining year of Scaffidi's mayoral term, he began work as mayor the next day.

Bukewicz was elected to a full term as mayor at the April 2018 general election, defeating city councilmember Mark Verhalen. He was re-elected without opposition in 2021 and 2024. Bukiewicz's decade as mayor coincided with significant population and economic growth in Oak Creek, including the establishment of a massive IKEA retail store, an Amazon fulfillment center, the state's first Buc-ee's travel center, and the relocation of Astronautics Corporation of America corporate headquarters to the city.

In January 2026, Bukiewicz announced that he would run as a Democrat for Wisconsin State Assembly in the 2026 elections. Bukiewicz's city of Oak Creek represented the bulk of the population making up Wisconsin's 21st Assembly district—a critical swing district long represented by moderate Republican Jessie Rodriguez. Bukiewicz was immediately endorsed by Democratic Assembly minority leader Greta Neubauer and Milwaukee mayor Cavalier Johnson. Rodriguez ultimately announced in May that she would not run for another term.

Before reaching the general election, Bukiewicz faced a challenging primary election against progressive former Catholic priest David Liners. Liners principal policy proposals included a moratorium on AI data center construction, expansion of BadgerCare, and raising the minimum wage; Liners was endorsed by other prominent Wisconsin progressives including Madison state representative Francesca Hong—who at that time was making a compelling run in the Democratic Primary for governor of Wisconsin—and local state senator Chris Larson, and also won the endorsement of the American Federation of Teachers. Bukiewicz ran on a more moderate platform; he did not favor a full moratorium on data centers, preferring to target policies toward ensuring local control and local benefit from such projects. In addition to his endorsements from Neubauer and Mayor Johnson, Bukiewicz also won endorsements from U.S. senator Tammy Baldwin, U.S. representative Gwen Moore, and the AFL-CIO.

Bukiewicz won the August 11 primary with 56% of the vote and went on to face 21-year-old Republican nominee Dylan Pfaffenbach in the general election. Pfaffenbach was a college student, and had a history of incendiary social media activity that he attempted to scrub during the election campaign. Bukiewicz won the election in a landslide, receiving roughly 62% of the vote. He is set to take office in January 2027, and has said he intends to continue serving as mayor of Oak Creek and president of the Milwaukee Building and Construction Trades Council.

== Personal life and family ==
Dan Bukiewicz has been married to his wife, Carolyn, for about 15 years. They have two adult children.

== Electoral history ==
=== Oak Creek mayor (2018, 2021, 2024) ===
Year	Election	Date	Elected				Defeated				Total	Plurality
2018	General	Apr. 3	Dan Bukiewicz (inc)	Nonpartisan	3,292	59.95%	Mark Verhalen	Non.	2,184	39.77%	5,491	1,108
2021	General	Apr. 6	Dan Bukiewicz (inc)	Nonpartisan	2,817	96.64%	--unopposed--				2,915	
2024	General	Apr. 2	Dan Bukiewicz (inc)	Nonpartisan	3,814	97.20%	--unopposed--				3,924	

=== Wisconsin Assembly (2026) ===
Year	Election	Date	Elected				Defeated				Total	Plurality
2026	Primary	Aug. 11	Daniel J. Bukiewicz	Democratic	4,585	56.69%	David Liners	Dem.	3,485	43.09%	8,088	1,100
2026	General	Nov. 3	Daniel J. Bukiewicz	Democratic	15,942	62.50%	Dylan Pfaffenbach	Rep.	9,567	37.50%	33,632	8,602
