= John Kroll =

21st-century American politician

Member-elect of the Wisconsin State Assembly from the 85th district
- Assuming office January 4, 2027
- Succeeding: Patrick Snyder

Personal details
- Born: 1983 (age 42–43)
- Party: Democratic
- Spouse: Elizabeth Meinen
- Children: 2
- Education: Western Technical College
- Website: Campaign website

John Joseph Kroll (born 1983) is an American small business owner and Democratic politician from Wausau, Wisconsin. He is a member-elect of the Wisconsin State Assembly, and will represent Wisconsin's 85th Assembly district in the 108th Wisconsin Legislature (2027–2028). He previously represented Wausau on the Board of Supervisors of Marathon County, Wisconsin, from 2024 to 2026.
