= Ben Brist =

21st-century American politician

Member-elect of the Wisconsin House of Representatives from the 61st district
- Assuming office January 2027
- Succeeding: Bob Donovan

Personal details
- Party: Democratic
- Parent: Steven C. Brist (father)
- Education: U.S. Military Academy; Harvard Kennedy School (M.P.P.)
- Website: Campaign website

Ben Brist is an American politician. A member of the Democratic Party, he is the member-elect for the 61st district of the Wisconsin State Assembly.

Brist attended the United States Military Academy, earning his bachelor's degree in 2017. He also attended Harvard Kennedy School, earning his Master of Public Policy degree in 2026.
