= Todd Novak =

21st century American politician

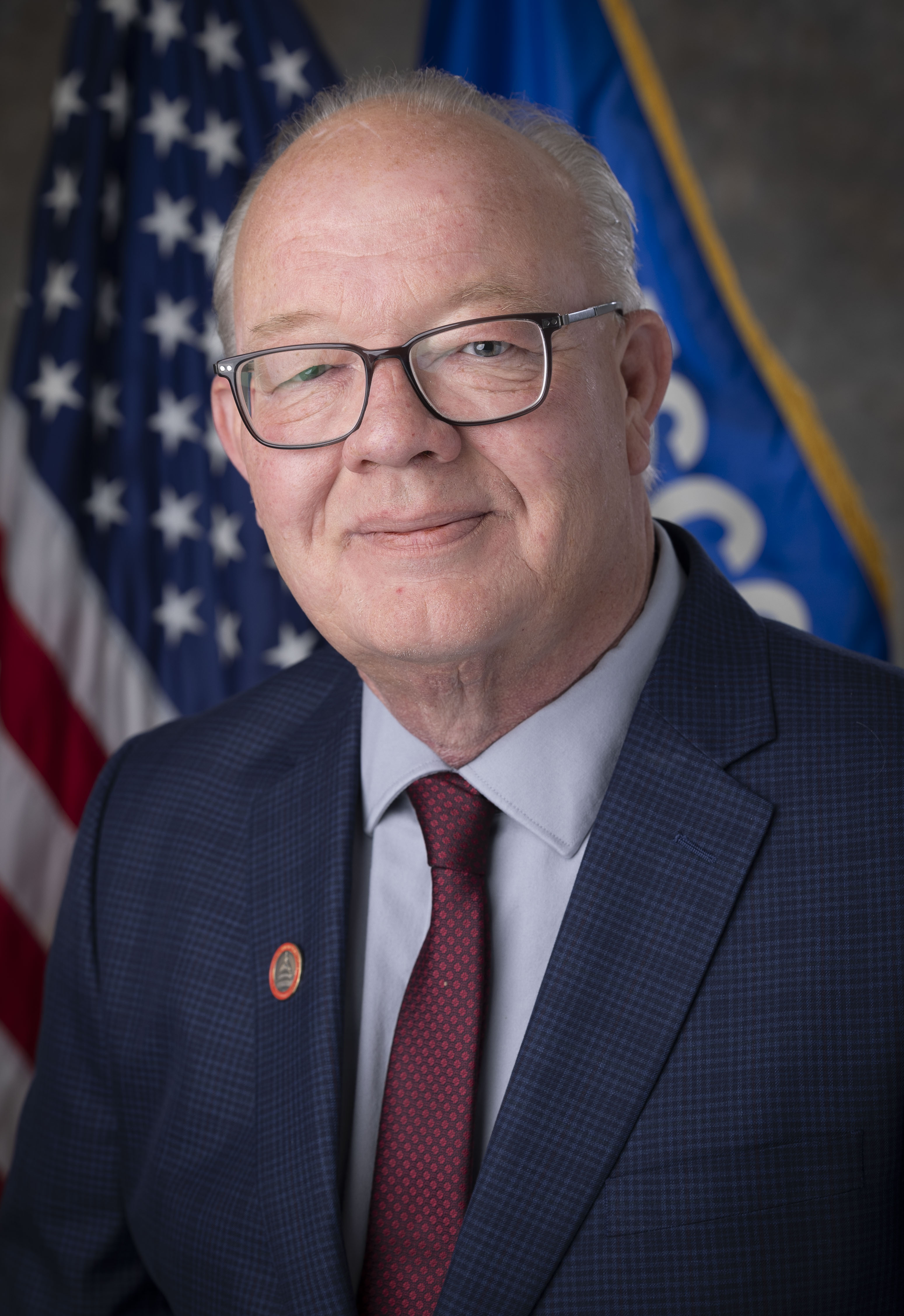
- Official portrait, 2025

Member of the Wisconsin State Assembly from the 51st district
- Incumbent
- Assumed office January 3, 2015
- Preceded by: Howard Marklein
- Succeeded by: Ben Gruber (elect)

Mayor of Dodgeville, Wisconsin
- In office April 2012 – April 16, 2024
- Preceded by: James McCaulley
- Succeeded by: Barry Hottmann

Personal details
- Born: April 23, 1965 (age 61) Cobb, Wisconsin, U.S.
- Party: Republican
- Occupation: Newspaper editor, politician
- Website: Official website Campaign website

Todd Daniel Novak (born April 23, 1965) is an American Republican politician and retired newspaper editor from Iowa County, Wisconsin. He is a member of the Wisconsin State Assembly, representing Wisconsin's 51st Assembly district since 2015. He previously served 12 years as mayor of Dodgeville, Wisconsin, from 2012 to 2024.

== Biography ==
Born in Cobb, Wisconsin, and currently residing in Dodgeville, Wisconsin, Novak was the government and assistant editor of the Dodgeville Chronicle newspaper from 1990 until his retirement in 2014. In 2012, Novak was elected mayor of Dodgeville, Wisconsin.

In November 2014, Novak was elected to the Wisconsin State Assembly as a Republican by a 64-vote margin. The Democratic candidate, Dick Cates, did not seek a recount.

On November 8, 2016, Novak was re-elected to the Wisconsin State Assembly by a margin of 723 votes, defeating Democrat Jeff Wright.

In 2018, Novak defeated Jeff Wright for a second time. Novak was also successful in winning an Assembly District also won by Democratic Governor Tony Evers.

On November 3, 2020, Novak was re-elected to his fourth term in the Wisconsin State Assembly. Novak defeated his challenger, Democrat Kriss Marion by a margin of 1,258 votes. This was his largest margin since first being elected to the Wisconsin State Assembly. He further increased his margin two years later, when he was re-elected to his fifth term in the Wisconsin State Assembly. Novak defeated his challenger, Democrat Leah Spicer, by a margin of 3,214 votes.

Although a Republican, Novak has positioned himself as an "independent voice" and has touted a bipartisan voting record, which is helpful in his liberal-leaning district.

== Wisconsin State Assembly ==
For the 2025–2027 Legislative Cycle, Novak served on the following committees:

- Assembly Committee on Local Government (Chair)
- Assembly Committee on Agriculture
- Assembly Committee on Criminal Justice & Public Safety
- Joint Review Committee on Criminal Penalties

In his first term in the State Assembly, Novak authored a bill creating the Frank Lloyd Wright Trail which links the architect's notable creations using existing roadways.

In the spring of 2018, in response to the Parkland High School shooting, Representative Novak authored legislation to establish the Office of School Safety (OSS). The bill was signed into law by Governor Scott Walker later that spring. The legislation created a $100 million grant program to be administered by the newly created Office of School Safety for public, private, and choice schools. The funds were designated for critical incident mapping, physical and technological security improvements, and a 24/7 hotline to report threats of violence.

On February 11, 2019, Speaker Vos appointed Novak chairman of a 16-member bipartisan task force on water quality. The task force was created to provide recommendations on assessing and improving the quality of surface water and groundwater throughout the state of Wisconsin. The task force traveled throughout the state, visiting the cities of Milwaukee, Madison, Green Bay, Janesville, Racine, Lancaster, LaCrosse, Mauston, Stevens Point, Menomonie, Tomahawk, Marinette, and Superior holding public hearings to gather information on specific concerns in the various regions of the state.

Representative Novak authored two bills as a result of the task force's findings. The first bill, 2019 Assembly Bill 790 increases funding for Wisconsin Land and Water Conservation staff. The bill also adds new language calling for conservation staff to work to implement the Conservation Reserve Enhancement Program (CREP). The CREP leverages federal and state funding to compensate farmers to voluntarily decommission farmland and implement conservation practices. The second bill, 2019 Assembly Bill 801 provides funding to the University of Wisconsin System to implement the Freshwater Collaborative. The Freshwater Collaborative Program is designed to address two unique challenges relevant in Wisconsin, Agriculture Water Management, and Water Quality Safety and emerging contaminants. As part of the Freshwater Collaborative, the UW System will work to establish and develop a variety of undergraduate programs focused on preparing the Wisconsin Workforce to address Water Management and Water Quality safety issues while expanding opportunities for research and collaboration across campuses.

During the 2023-24 budget cycle, the Office of School Safety was excluded from the state budget request. On February 2, 2024, Novak introduced legislation to continue funding for the Office of School Safety through the 2025 fiscal year. The bill was signed into law by Governor Tony Evers on March 28, 2024, ensuring that the highly regarded office would continue its operations into 2025.

== Electoral history ==
=== Wisconsin Assembly (2014–present) ===
Year	Election	Date	Elected				Defeated				Total	Plurality
2014	Primary	Aug. 12	Todd Novak	Republican	2,262	48.29%	Dennis Polivka	Rep.	922	19.68%	4,684	1,340
2014	Primary	Aug. 12	Todd Novak	Republican	2,262	48.29%	Tyler G. Schultz	Rep.	859	18.34%	4,684	1,340
2014	Primary	Aug. 12	Todd Novak	Republican	2,262	48.29%	Ken Rhino Rynes	Rep.	639	13.64%	4,684	1,340
2014	General	Nov. 4	Todd Novak	Republican	10,642	47.48%	Dick Cates	Dem.	10,577	47.19%	22,413	65
2014	General	Nov. 4	Todd Novak	Republican	10,642	47.48%	Adam Laufenberg	Ind.	1,177	5.25%	22,413	65
2016	General	Nov. 8	Todd Novak (inc.)	Republican	13,912	51.29%	Jeff Wright	Dem.	13,189	48.62%	27,124	723
2018	General	Nov. 6	Todd Novak (inc.)	Republican	12,445	50.65%	Jeff Wright	Dem.	12,113	49.29%	24,573	332
2020	General	Nov. 3	Todd Novak (inc.)	Republican	15,937	52.04%	Kriss Marion	Dem.	14,679	47.93%	30,624	1,258
2022	General	Nov. 8	Todd Novak (inc.)	Republican	14,760	56.08%	Leah Spicer	Dem.	11,546	43.87%	26,320	3,214
2024	General	Nov. 5	Todd Novak (inc.)	Republican	17,682	51.66%	Elizabeth Grabe	Dem.	16,524	48.27%	34,230	1,158

Wisconsin State Assembly
Preceded by Howard Marklein	Member of the Wisconsin State Assembly from the 51st district January 3, 2015 – present	Incumbent
Political offices
Preceded by James McCaulley	Mayor of Dodgeville, Wisconsin; April 2012 – April 2024	Succeeded by Barry Hottmann
