= Dave Murphy (politician) =

American businessman and politician

David Murphy
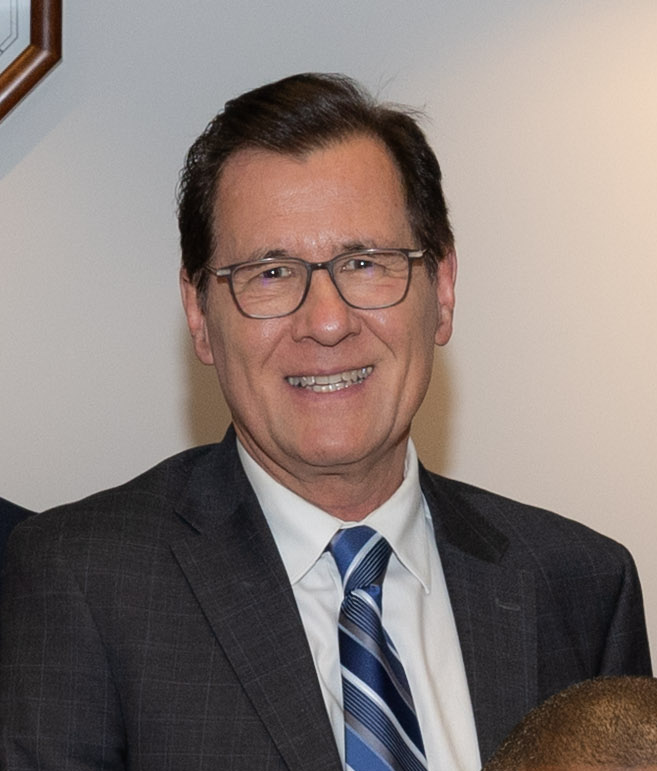
- Dave Murphy in 2023

Member of the Wisconsin State Assembly from the 56th district
- Incumbent
- Assumed office January 7, 2013
- Preceded by: Michelle Litjens
- Succeeded by: Anthony Phillips (elect)

Personal details
- Born: November 26, 1954 (age 71) Appleton, Wisconsin
- Party: Republican
- Education: University of Wisconsin–Fox Valley
- Profession: Politician
- Website: Official website

David J. Murphy (born November 26, 1954) is an American businessman and politician.

== Biogarphy ==
From Greenville, Wisconsin, Murphy is the owner of a fitness center and went to the University of Wisconsin–Fox Valley. In November 2012, Murphy was elected to the Wisconsin State Assembly as a Republican.

In December 2016, Murphy pressured the University of Wisconsin–Madison to cancel a course entitled "The Problem of Whiteness" and fire the lecturer teaching it.

== Electoral history ==
=== Wisconsin Assembly (2012–2024) ===
| Year | Election | Date | Elected | | | | Defeated | | | | Total | Plurality |
|---|---|---|---|---|---|---|---|---|---|---|---|---|
| 2012 | Primary | Aug. 14 | Dave Murphy | Republican | 3,639 | 51.46% | Jim Pleuss | Rep. | 3,415 | 48.29% | 7,072 | 224 |
| 2012 | General | Nov. 6 | Dave Murphy | Republican | 18,306 | 58.29% | Richard B. Schoenbohm | Dem. | 13,071 | 41.62% | 31,407 | 5,235 |
| 2014 | General | Nov. 4 | Dave Murphy (inc) | Republican | 20,844 | 99.57% | --Unopposed-- | | | | 20,935 | 20,753 |
| 2016 | General | Nov. 8 | Dave Murphy (inc) | Republican | 21,022 | 64.52% | Mariana Stout | Dem. | 11,551 | 35.45% | 32,583 | 9,471 |
| 2018 | General | Nov. 6 | Dave Murphy (inc) | Republican | 18,033 | 59.82% | Diana Lawrence | Dem. | 12,110 | 40.17% | 30,147 | 5,923 |
| 2020 | General | Nov. 3 | Dave Murphy (inc) | Republican | 23,083 | 60.52% | Diana Lawrence | Dem. | 15,054 | 39.47% | 38,142 | 8,029 |
| 2022 | General | Nov. 8 | Dave Murphy (inc) | Republican | 16,875 | 59.03% | Patrick Hayden | Dem. | 11,710 | 40.97% | 28,585 | 5,165 |
| 2024 | General | Nov. 5 | Dave Murphy (inc) | Republican | 23,789 | 64.74% | Emily Tseffos | Dem. | 12,950 | 35.24% | 37,464 | 10,839 |
