= Kevin Krentz =

American politician

Member-elect of the Wisconsin State Assembly from the 57th district
- Assuming office January 2027
- Succeeding: Kevin David Petersen

Personal details
- Party: Republican

Kevin Krentz is an American politician. A member of the Republican Party, he is the member-elect for the 57th district of the Wisconsin State Assembly.
