= Bryson Reyes =

American politician

Member-elect of the Wisconsin State Assembly from the 82nd district
- Assuming office January 2027
- Succeeding: Scott Allen

Personal details
- Party: Republican

Bryson Reyes is an American politician. A member of the Republican Party, he is the member-elect for the 82nd district of the Wisconsin State Assembly.
