= Karen DeSanto =

21st century American entertainer and politician

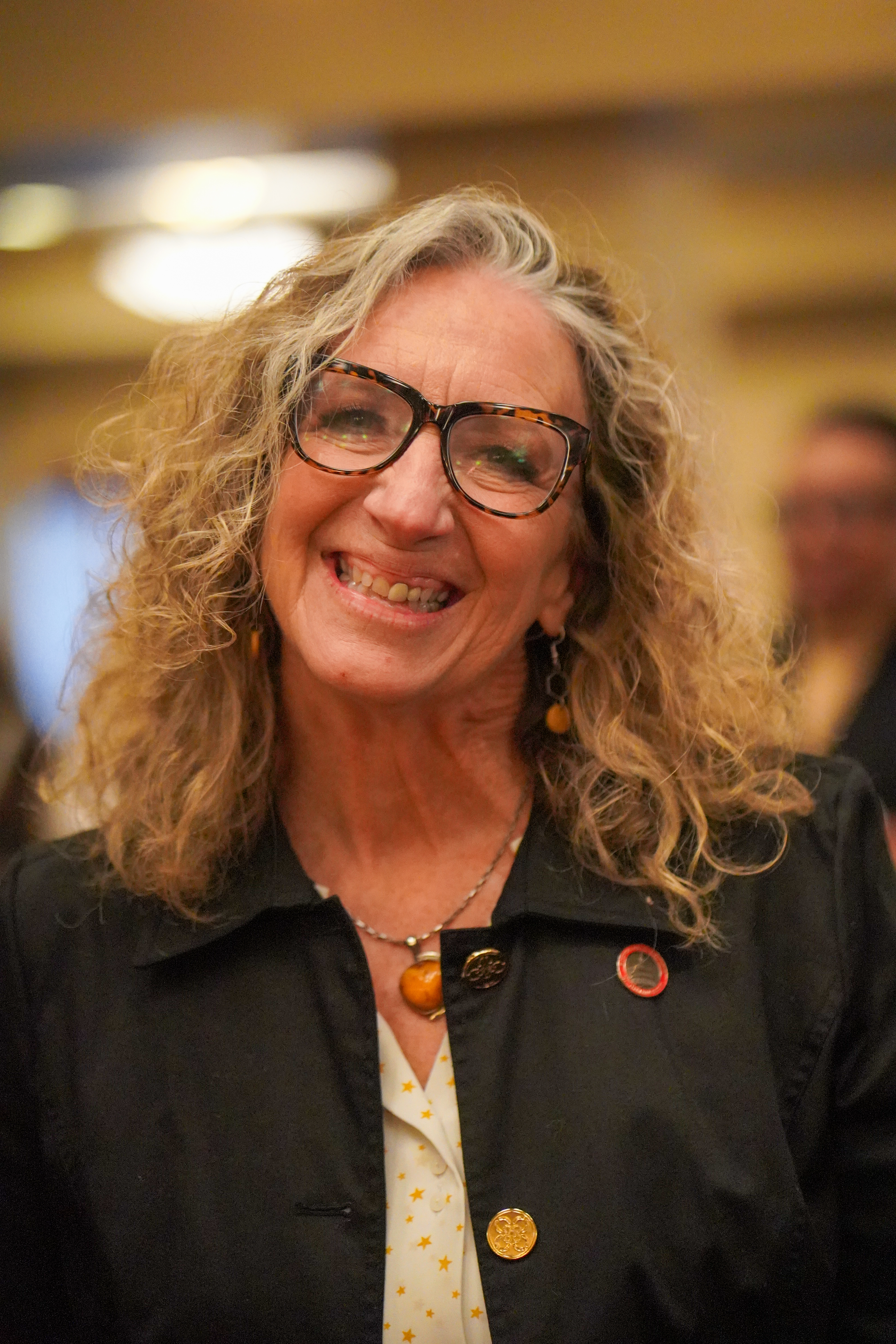
- DeSanto in 2026

Member of the Wisconsin State Assembly from the 40th district
- Incumbent
- Assumed office January 6, 2025
- Preceded by: Kevin David Petersen

Personal details
- Born: Karen Cecile Rylander; July 3, 1964 (age 62) Sacramento, California, U.S.
- Party: Democratic
- Spouse: Gregory R. DeSanto (m. 1995; div. 2019)
- Children: 1
- Education: Cosumnes River College
- Occupation: Entertainer, educator, politician

Karen Cecile DeSanto (née Rylander; born July 3, 1964) is an American educator, Democratic politician, and former entertainer from Baraboo, Wisconsin. She is a member of the Wisconsin State Assembly, representing Wisconsin's 40th Assembly district since 2025. Earlier in her career, she performed with her former husband, Greg DeSanto, as professional circus clowns in a husband-and-wife act.

== Early life and education ==
Karen DeSanto was born Karen Rylander in Sacramento, California, on July 3, 1964. She was raised and educated in Sacramento, graduating from Luther Burbank High School. She began working as a professional clown, specializing in children's birthday parties.

== Professional career ==
In the early 1990s, she attended a clown camp in Wisconsin and was encouraged to apply to Ringling Clown College. She attended and graduated in 1993, and was then featured in Ringling's Blue unit. A member of the Clown Care (SM) hospital clowning program of the Big Apple Circus, Karen was one of the country's leading clown instructors and has developed teaching programs for the Circus's Arts-In-Education program, the National Circus Project and Ocean Park Amusements. Her performances have taken her to the stages of Carnegie Hall, the State Capital of California, and the Macy's Thanksgiving Day Parade. Karen is also a published author with articles in Rosie magazine and the children's book, Star Saves the Circus.

Together with her husband, the DeSantos have served as consultants for Feld Entertainment and have directed the clown material for many editions of Ringling Brothers and Barnum & Bailey. They have been featured comics on cruise lines and in circuses around the world. For seven seasons, Greg and Karen were the resident clowns at Circus World Museum in Baraboo, Wisconsin, and appeared together in the Big Apple Circus' 2005-06 production Grandma Goes To Hollywood.

Karen served as C.E.O. of the Boys & Girls Clubs of West Central Wisconsin from 2011 to 2024. Over the course of her twelve years, she doubled the number of boys & girls club facilities in her region from 2 to 4. She was awarded Women in Industry award by InBusiness Madison in 2018. Additionally, she was named 2019 Wisconsin CEO of the Year, 2020 CEO of the Year Midwest Region, and 2021 CEO of the Year, National Boys & Girls Clubs of America.

== Political career ==
DeSanto made her first bid for public office in 2024, running for Wisconsin State Assembly in the 40th Assembly district. Wisconsin had just undergone a dramatic legislative redistricting, after the state Supreme Court struck down a decade-old Republican gerrymander. DeSanto's home region of Sauk County was significantly affected by the redistricting. The new 40th district stretched from northwest Columbia County through eastern and southern Sauk County; no incumbent representative resided in the new district. DeSanto was one of three candidates seeking the Democratic Party nomination, including realtor Brad Cook and engineer Kyle Kunicki, son of former Assembly speaker Walter Kunicki. DeSanto won the primary by a comfortable margin, taking 53% of the vote. In the general election, she defeated Jerry Helmer, the chairman of the Sauk County Republican Party. She took office in January 2025.

== Personal life and family ==
Karen DeSanto is one of four children born to Roy and Marguerite (née Brandt) Rylander.

Karen Rylander took the last name DeSanto after she married fellow performer Greg DeSanto in 1995. They have one adult child.

Greg DeSanto graduated in 1985 from the acclaimed Ringling Brothers and Barnum & Bailey Clown College. He was the featured producing clown and created, wrote, and directed original clown material for Ringling's Blue, Red, and Gold units. His work as a performer has been featured in the center ring of Madison Square Garden, the historic vaudeville stage of the Sarasota Opera House, Lincoln Center, and the White House. He was also a featured performer in the 1996-97 Big Apple Circus tour, Medicine Show. He was inducted into the EHS Hall of Fame in 2001.

They separated professionally and were divorced in 2019. Greg continues to serve as executive director of the International Clown Hall of Fame and Research Center in Baraboo. He also consults, directs, writes and appears in a variety of circus and festival performances. He was named a "Circus Legend" by the Association of Circus Fans of America in 2019.

== Electoral history ==
=== Wisconsin Assembly (2024) ===
Wisconsin Assembly, 40th District Election, 2024
Party	Candidate	Votes	%	±%
Democratic Primary, August 13, 2024
Democratic	Karen DeSanto	4,408	53.29%	
Democratic	Kyle Kunicki	2,004	24.23%	
Democratic	Brad Cook	1,858	22.46%	
	Scattering	2	0.02%	
Plurality		2,404	29.06%	
Total votes		8,272	100.0%	
General Election, November 5, 2024
Democratic	Karen DeSanto	17,949	54.09%	+29.60pp
Republican	Jerry Helmer	15,221	45.87%	−29.42pp
	Scattering	16	0.05%	
Plurality		2,728	8.22%	
Total votes		33,186	100.0%	+29.05%
Democratic gain from Republican				

Wisconsin State Assembly
Preceded by Kevin David Petersen	Member of the Wisconsin State Assembly from the 40th district January 6, 2025 – present	Incumbent
