= Kevin Knoke =

American politician

Member-elect of the Wisconsin State Assembly from the 30th district
- Assuming office January 2027
- Succeeding: Shannon Zimmerman

Personal details
- Party: Democratic
- Spouse: Jill Greener (m. 1995)
- Children: 2
- Education: University of St. Thomas; University of Minnesota Duluth
- Profession: Geologist, educator
- Website: Campaign website

Military service
- Allegiance: United States
- Branch/service: U.S. Army Reserve

Kevin Knoke is an American geologist, educator, and Democratic politician from Hudson, Wisconsin. He is a member-elect of the Wisconsin State Assembly, and will represent Wisconsin's 30th Assembly district in the 108th Wisconsin Legislature (2027–2028). He previously worked as an elementary school teacher in the Hudson School District for more than 26 years, retiring in 2025.

== Early life and education ==
Kevin Knoke was raised and educated in Rochester, Minnesota, graduating from Mayo High School. He went on to attend the University of St. Thomas in Minneapolis–Saint Paul. He then pursued a master's degree in hydrology from the University of Minnesota Duluth.

Knoke ultimately settled in Hudson, Wisconsin, where he worked as a teacher in the Hudson School District from 1998 until 2025; for most of those years as a fifth grade teacher. During those years, he also served eight years as an officer in the United States Army Reserve, and was deployed in 2002, during the Global War on Terror.

== Political career ==
In February 2026, Knoke announced that he would run as a Democrat for Wisconsin State Assembly in the 30th Assembly district. Knoke faced no opposition for the Democratic Party nomination, and went on to face five-term incumbent Republican state representative Shannon Zimmerman in the general election. The race was identified by observers as one of the critical battleground districts for control of the legislative majority, and saw significant campaign spending. Knoke emphasized the cost of living and state funding of education in his campaign, saying he wants to pursue policies to lower healthcare costs and provide property tax relief. He also described the state's school voucher program as an unsustainable financial drain on state education funding, and a threat to the state's ability to fund other state services. At the November 2026 general election, Knoke defeated the incumbent, Zimmerman, receiving 53% of the vote. He is set to take office in January 2027.

== Personal life and family ==
Kevin Knoke married Jill Greener in June 1995. They reside in Hudson, Wisconsin, and have two adult children.
