= Becky Nichols =

American politician

Member-elect of the Wisconsin State Assembly from the 53rd district
- Assuming office January 2027
- Succeeding: Dean Kaufert

Personal details
- Party: Democratic

Becky Nichols is an American politician. A member of the Democratic Party, she is the member-elect for the 53rd district of the Wisconsin State Assembly.
