= William M. Rohan =

American politician

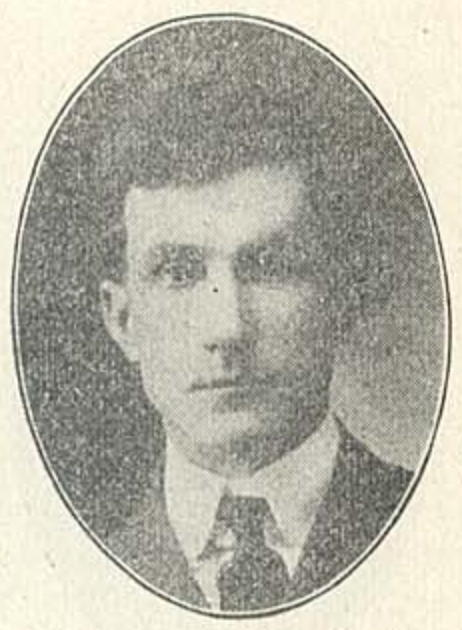

Member of the Wisconsin State Assembly from the Outagamie 2nd district
- In office January 6, 1947 – January 1, 1951
- Preceded by: Gustave Hanges
- Succeeded by: Gerald Lorge
- In office January 4, 1943 – January 1, 1945
- Preceded by: Lloyd Lang
- Succeeded by: Gustave Hanges
- In office January 4, 1937 – January 2, 1939
- Preceded by: William Bay
- Succeeded by: William J. Gantter
- In office January 2, 1933 – January 7, 1935
- Preceded by: William Bay
- Succeeded by: William Bay
- In office January 2, 1911 – January 6, 1913
- Preceded by: Peter Philipps
- Succeeded by: Charles H. Mory

Personal details
- Born: March 31, 1873 Buchanan, Wisconsin, U.S.
- Died: August 31, 1959 (aged 86)
- Party: Republican
- Other political affiliations: Democratic (before 1946); Independent (1950)
- Spouse: Mamie E. Golden (m. 1906; death 1925)
- Children: 10
- Education: Green Bay Business College
- Occupation: Farmer, politician

William M. Rohan (March 31, 1873 – August 31, 1959) was an American farmer and Republican politician from Outagamie County, Wisconsin. He served several non-consecutive terms in the state assembly For most of his political career he was a Democrat, before switching parties in 1946.

== Background ==
Rohan was born on March 31, 1873, in Buchanan, and would live there his whole life. He received his early education in public and parochial schools and later attended the Green Bay Business College. On October 6, 1906, he married Mamie E. Golden (born November 3, 1887). She died December 22, 1925, of pneumonia, leaving him with eight sons and two daughters.

== Public office ==
Rohan was elected treasurer of the Town of Buchanan in 1905 and re-elected for the next four years, at the end of which time he resigned. He was first elected as a member of the Assembly in 1910 from Outagamie's 2nd Assembly district as a Democrat, with 1,711 votes against 1,600 for James D. Keelan (Republican) and 80 for Social Democrat Anton M. Miller. (Republican incumbent Peter Philipps Sr. was not a candidate.) He was assigned to the standing committees on Towns and Villages, and on labor and labor conditions. The 2nd district was slightly redistricted before the 1912 election, and Rohan was unseated by Republican Charles Mory, who polled 1,858 to Rohan's 1,823 and Miller's 97 votes. From 1922 to 1925 he was town chairman (equivalent to mayor) and thus ex officio member of the county board of supervisors.

In 1928, his son John Rohan was elected to his old district.

William Rohan returned to the Assembly in the election of 1932, unseating Republican William Bay, who had defeated John Rohan in 1930. In the weeks after the election, it was widely reported that the La Follette Progressives were hoping to make a deal with members of the massive new Democratic majority in the Assembly to elect Rohan as Speaker of the Assembly, a suggestion which he himself publicly repudiated. He was defeated by Bay (now running as a Progressive) in 1934, with 3,888 votes for Bay; 3,076 for Rohan, and 1536 for Republican George Fiedler.

In 1936, Rohan again returned to the Assembly (Bay had resigned in December 1935 to accept a national leadership position in his union), with 4,342 votes to 3,587 for Progressive Matt Brill and 2,564 for Republican Arthur Zuitches. In 1938, Rohan was unseated by Republican William Gantter, who drew 2,709 votes to 2,327 for Rohan; 2,016 for Progressive ex-Assemblyman Anton Miller; and 534 for Union Party candidate Arthur Hoolihan. He lost again in 1940 to Republican Lloyd Lang, but in 1942 defeated Republican George L. Smith with 3,565 votes to 3,108 for Smith (Lang was not a candidate for re-election), having defeated two other candidates (including Socialist-turned-Progressive Miller) in the Democratic primary. In 1944, Rohan was unseated by Republican Gustave Hanges, with 4,840 votes to Hanges' 6,256

In 1946, after having run for a third of a century as a Democrat, Rohan ran for the nomination of the Republican Party (into which the Progressive Party had just merged), defeating incumbent Hanges in the Republican primary and two candidates (Democratic nominee William H. Powers and independent Willard Van Handel) in the general election. He defeated Hanges again in the 1948 Republican primary, and Democrat Roy Nelson in the general election (6,568 - 4,701). In 1950, however, Rohan lost the Republican nomination in a four-way contest to Gerald Lorge, who pulled 1415 votes to Rohan's 1075, Hanges' 580 and Carl Konrad's 379. He ran as an independent in the November general election, but came in third with only 1928 votes to Lorge's 6,106 and Democrat Katherine Sullivan's 2,306. He challenged Lorge unsuccessfully in the 1952 primary.

== After the Assembly ==
He died on August 31, 1959, and was buried at the Parish Cemetery of St. Mary's Catholic Church in Kaukauna. At the time of his death, all ten of his and Mamie's children were still living.
