= Wisconsin's 85th Assembly district =

American legislative district for Wausau, Wisconsin

Wisconsin's 85th State Assembly district
- 2024 map defined in 2023 Wisc. Act 94; 2022 map defined in Johnson v. Wisconsin Elections Commission; 2011 map was defined in 2011 Wisc. Act 43
Assemblymember
| Patrick Snyder; R–Schofield |
since January 3, 2017 (9 years)
- Demographics: 83.57% White; 1.88% Black; 2.71% Hispanic; 9.3% Asian; 1.97% Native American; 0.12% Hawaiian/Pacific Islander
- Population (2020) • Voting age: 59,110; 45,970
- Website: Official website
- Notes: Wausau, Wisconsin

The 85th Assembly district of Wisconsin is one of 99 districts in the Wisconsin State Assembly. Located in north-central Wisconsin, the district is entirely contained within Marathon County. It includes the city of Wausau and the village of Weston. The district is represented by Republican Patrick Snyder, since January 2017. After the 2024 redistricting, Snyder no longer resides in the new 85th district.

The 85th Assembly district is located within Wisconsin's 29th Senate district, along with the 86th and 87th Assembly districts.

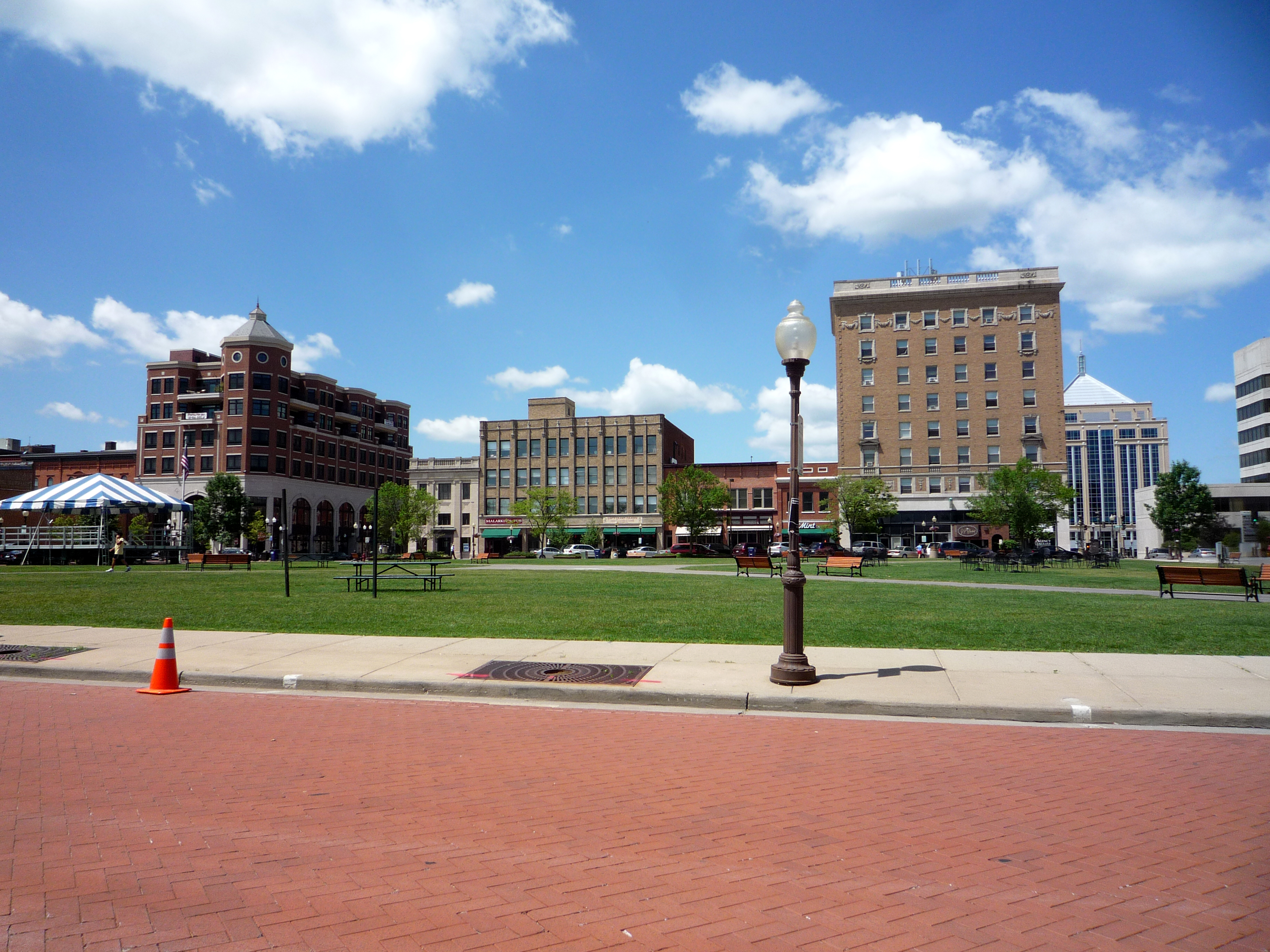
Downtown Wausau

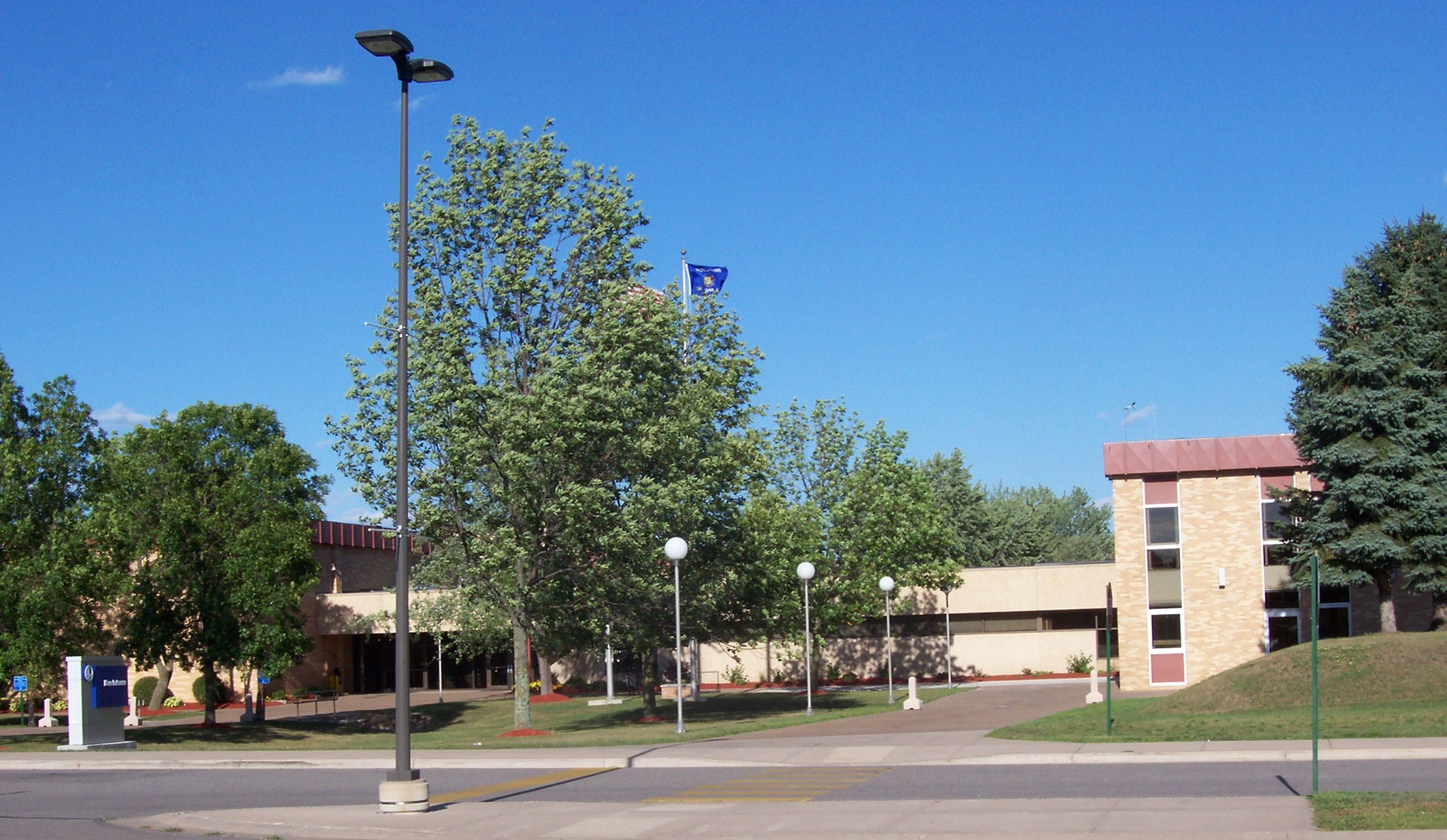
Northcentral Technical College in Wausau

== History ==
The district was created in the 1972 redistricting act (1971 Wisc. Act 304) which first established the numbered district system, replacing the previous system which allocated districts to specific counties. The 85th district was drawn almost exactly in line with the previous Marathon County 2nd district (the cities of Wausau and Schofield, and north-central Marathon County. The last representative of the Marathon County 2nd district, Tony Earl, went on to win the 1972 election as the first representative of the 85th Assembly district. The district has remained in the same vicinity, centered on Wausau and Schofield, in the various redistricting schemes since 1972, with the exception of the 1982 court-ordered plan which temporarily moved the district to eastern Waupaca County. The 2011 redistricting act was the most significant change to the boundaries of the district since 1982, maintaining Wausau and Schofield in the district, but shifting away from the north-central towns of Marathon County to encompass more of the rural eastern half of the county.

The 2024 redistricting (2023 Wisc. Act 94) swapped out Schofield and a number of towns in favor of the neighboring village of Weston. Under the new map, the 85th district is projected to be one of the most competitive districts in the state legislature.

Notable former representatives of the 85th district include Tony Earl, who was later elected the 41st Governor of Wisconsin, and Gregory Huber, who was later appointed as a Wisconsin circuit court judge by Governor Jim Doyle and is now the current chief judge for the 9th judicial administrative district of Wisconsin.

== List of past representatives ==
List of representatives to the Wisconsin State Assembly from the 85th district
| Member | Party | Residence | Counties represented | Term start | Term end | Ref. |
|---|---|---|---|---|---|---|
District sreated
| Tony Earl | Dem. | Wausau | Marathon | January 1, 1973 | January 6, 1975 | |
| Edward F. McClain | Dem. | Wausau | Marathon | January 6, 1975 | January 5, 1981 | |
| John H. Robinson | Dem. | Wausau | Marathon | January 5, 1981 | January 3, 1983 | |
| Francis R. Byers | Rep. | Clintonville | Outagamie, Waupaca, Winnebago | January 3, 1983 | January 7, 1985 | |
| John H. Robinson | Dem. | Wausau | Marathon | January 7, 1985 | May 23, 1988 | |
| --Vacant-- | | | Marathon | May 23, 1988 | January 2, 1989 | |
| Gregory Huber | Dem. | Wausau | Marathon | January 2, 1989 | May 31, 2004 | |
| --Vacant-- | | | Marathon, Shawano | May 31, 2004 | January 3, 2005 | |
| Donna J. Seidel | Dem. | Wausau | Marathon, Shawano | January 3, 2005 | January 7, 2013 | |
| Mandy Wright | Dem. | Wausau | Marathon | January 7, 2013 | January 5, 2015 | |
| David Heaton | Rep. | Wausau | Marathon | January 5, 2015 | January 3, 2017 | |
| Patrick Snyder | Rep. | Schofield | Marathon | January 3, 2017 | Current | |

== Electoral history ==
| Year | Date | Elected | | | | Defeated | | | | Total | Plurality | Other primary candidates |
|---|---|---|---|---|---|---|---|---|---|---|---|---|
| 1972 | Nov. 7 | Tony Earl | Democratic | 14,432 | 100.0% | | | | | 14,432 | 14,432 | |
| 1974 | Nov. 5 | Edward F. McClain | Democratic | 7,038 | 50.01% | Frank A. Savino | Rep. | 7,034 | 49.99% | 14,072 | 4 | Alois W. Kowalchyk (Dem.); Ervin C. Marquardt (Dem.) |
| 1976 | Nov. 2 | Edward F. McClain (inc.) | Democratic | 12,553 | 62.83% | Vincent K. Howard | Rep. | 7,427 | 37.17% | 19,980 | 5,126 | |
| 1978 | Nov. 7 | Edward F. McClain (inc.) | Democratic | 9,241 | 54.91% | Vincent K. Howard | Rep. | 7,588 | 45.09% | 16,829 | 1,653 | |
| 1980 | Nov. 4 | John H. Robinson | Democratic | 11,026 | 51.49% | Kay B. Smith | Rep. | 10,387 | 48.51% | 21,413 | 639 | Raymond J. Omernick (Rep.); Rosalie LaRocque (Dem.); David G. Lincoln (Dem.) |
| 1982 | Nov. 2 | Francis R. Byers | Republican | 9,213 | 70.76% | Benjamin Amador | Dem. | 3,807 | 29.24% | 13,020 | 5,406 | Ervin W. Conradt (Rep.) |
| 1984 | Nov. 6 | John H. Robinson | Democratic | 13,452 | 60.79% | Patrick D. Braatz | Rep. | 8,678 | 39.21% | 22,130 | 4,774 | |
| 1986 | Nov. 4 | John H. Robinson (inc.) | Democratic | 10,868 | 63.39% | Robert J. Gwidt | Rep. | 6,278 | 36.61% | 17,146 | 4,590 | |
| 1988 | Nov. 8 | Gregory Huber | Democratic | 10,595 | 50.48% | David M. Torkko | Rep. | 10,392 | 49.52% | 20,987 | 203 | Larry Saeger (Dem.); Francis Xavier Vogel (Dem.); Patrick D. Braatz (Rep.) |
| 1990 | Nov. 6 | Gregory Huber (inc.) | Democratic | 9,785 | 57.30% | Rebecca Dodson | Rep. | 7,291 | 42.70% | 17,076 | 2,494 | |
| 1992 | Nov. 3 | Gregory Huber (inc.) | Democratic | 16,211 | 100.0% | | | | | 16,211 | 16,211 | |
| 1994 | Nov. 8 | Gregory Huber (inc.) | Democratic | 10,446 | 65.23% | Eric D. Zeichert | Rep. | 5,568 | 34.77% | 16,014 | 4,878 | |
| 1996 | Nov. 5 | Gregory Huber (inc.) | Democratic | 14,628 | 70.44% | Eric D. Zeichert | Rep. | 6,139 | 29.56% | 20,767 | 8,489 | |
| 1998 | Nov. 3 | Gregory Huber (inc.) | Democratic | 9,873 | 59.22% | Al Lippert | Rep. | 6,800 | 40.78% | 16,673 | 3,073 | |
| 2000 | Nov. 7 | Gregory Huber (inc.) | Democratic | 13,692 | 62.26% | Al Lippert | Rep. | 8,297 | 37.73% | 21,992 | 5,395 | |
| 2002 | Nov. 5 | Gregory Huber (inc.) | Democratic | 14,079 | 99.78% | | | | | 14,110 | 14,048 | |
| 2004 | Nov. 2 | Donna J. Seidel | Democratic | 15,666 | 57.29% | Sarah L. Kamke | Rep. | 11,667 | 42.67% | 27,345 | 3,999 | Bill Marcis (Rep.); Linda Minnihan (Rep.); Ed Gale (Rep.) |
| 2006 | Nov. 7 | Donna J. Seidel (inc.) | Democratic | 12,802 | 64.55% | Bryan Rasmussen | Rep. | 7,025 | 35.42% | 19,832 | 5,777 | |
| 2008 | Nov. 4 | Donna J. Seidel (inc.) | Democratic | 16,975 | 64.08% | Jess F. Kufahl | Rep. | 9,487 | 35.81% | 26,489 | 7,488 | |
| 2010 | Nov. 2 | Donna J. Seidel (inc.) | Democratic | 10,298 | 52.53% | Charles R. Eno | Rep. | 8,460 | 43.15% | 19,604 | 1,838 | |
| 2010 | Nov. 2 | Donna J. Seidel (inc.) | Democratic | 10,298 | 52.53% | Jim Maas | Lib. | 830 | 4.23% | 19,604 | 1,838 | |
| 2012 | Nov. 6 | Mandy Wright | Democratic | 13,930 | 49.70% | Patrick Snyder | Rep. | 13,025 | 46.47% | 28,026 | 905 | Jeff Johnson (Dem.) |
| 2012 | Nov. 6 | Mandy Wright | Democratic | 13,930 | 49.70% | Jim Maas | Ind. | 1,047 | 3.74% | 28,026 | 905 | Jeff Johnson (Dem.) |
| 2014 | Nov. 4 | Dave Heaton | Republican | 11,167 | 50.19% | Mandy Wright (inc.) | Dem. | 11,082 | 49.81% | 22,249 | 85 | |
| 2016 | Nov. 8 | Patrick Snyder | Republican | 14,722 | 53.35% | Mandy Wright | Dem. | 12,837 | 46.52% | 27,594 | 1,885 | |
| 2018 | Nov. 6 | Patrick Snyder (inc.) | Republican | 13,791 | 55.25% | Alyson Leahy | Dem. | 11,150 | 44.67% | 24,962 | 2,641 | |
| 2020 | Nov. 3 | Patrick Snyder (inc.) | Republican | 16,599 | 55.09% | Jeff Johnson | Dem. | 13,515 | 44.85% | 30,132 | 3,084 | Aaron A. LaFave (Dem.) |
| 2022 | Nov. 8 | Patrick Snyder (inc.) | Republican | 13,689 | 56.2% | Kristin Conway | Dem. | 10,659 | 43.76% | 24,358 | 3,030 | |
