= Robin Vos =

American politician (born 1968)

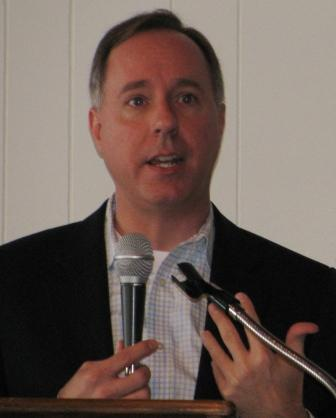
- Vos in 2013

79th Speaker of the Wisconsin State Assembly
- Incumbent
- Assumed office January 7, 2013
- Preceded by: Jeff Fitzgerald

Member of the Wisconsin State Assembly
- Incumbent
- Assumed office January 6, 2025
- Preceded by: Scott Johnson
- Constituency: 33rd district
- In office January 3, 2005 – January 6, 2025
- Preceded by: Bonnie Ladwig
- Succeeded by: Robert Wittke
- Constituency: 63rd district

President of the National Conference of State Legislatures
- In office 2022–2023 Serving with Scott Bedke
- Preceded by: Scott Saiki
- Succeeded by: Brian Patrick Kennedy
- In office 2019–2021
- Preceded by: Toi Hutchinson
- Succeeded by: Scott Saiki

Personal details
- Born: July 5, 1968 (age 58) Burlington, Wisconsin, U.S.
- Party: Republican
- Spouses: Amy Kuemmel (m. 2000; div. 2003); Samantha Schmitt (m. 2008; div. 2017); Michelle Litjens (m. 2017)
- Education: University of Wisconsin, Whitewater (BA)
- Website: State Assembly website Official Twitter

Robin Joseph Vos (born July 5, 1968) is an American businessman and Republican politician from Racine County, Wisconsin. He is the 79th speaker of the Wisconsin State Assembly and the longest-serving speaker in Wisconsin history, having served since 2013. Vos has been a member of the Assembly since 2005. He was also president of the National Conference of State Legislatures.

Vos came to prominence for his role in shepherding legislation to weaken bargaining rights and labor unions under Governor Scott Walker. Under Governor Tony Evers, Vos has sought to curb the governor's powers and expand legislative authority.

== Early life and education ==
Vos was born in 1968, in Burlington, Wisconsin, in Racine County. He graduated from Burlington High School in 1986.

Vos attended the University of Wisconsin–Whitewater, where he studied political science and public relations. While at Whitewater, he roomed with Reince Priebus, who later became chairman of the Republican Party of Wisconsin, chairman of the Republican National Committee, and White House chief of staff. In 1989, Wisconsin governor Tommy Thompson appointed Vos as a student representative on the University of Wisconsin board of regents. Vos graduated in 1991.

== Business career and early political career ==
After graduation, Vos worked as a legislative assistant to state representatives Jim Ladwig and Bonnie Ladwig. In 1994, Vos was elected to the Racine county board of supervisors. He remained on the board for the next 10 years. Also in 1994, Vos worked as district director for U.S. representative Mark Neumann of Wisconsin.

In 1996 Vos purchased the RoJos Popcorn Company in Burlington. In 2020, his popcorn business, Robin J. Vos Enterprises, received more than $150,000 in coronavirus relief from the Paycheck Protection Program.

Vos has an ownership stake of $4.8 million in rental properties in Whitewater, Wisconsin. In 2021, Vos led Republican efforts in the Wisconsin legislature to redirect COVID-19 relief payments so that they would go directly to landlords to help with rent relief for renters.

== Wisconsin state legislature ==
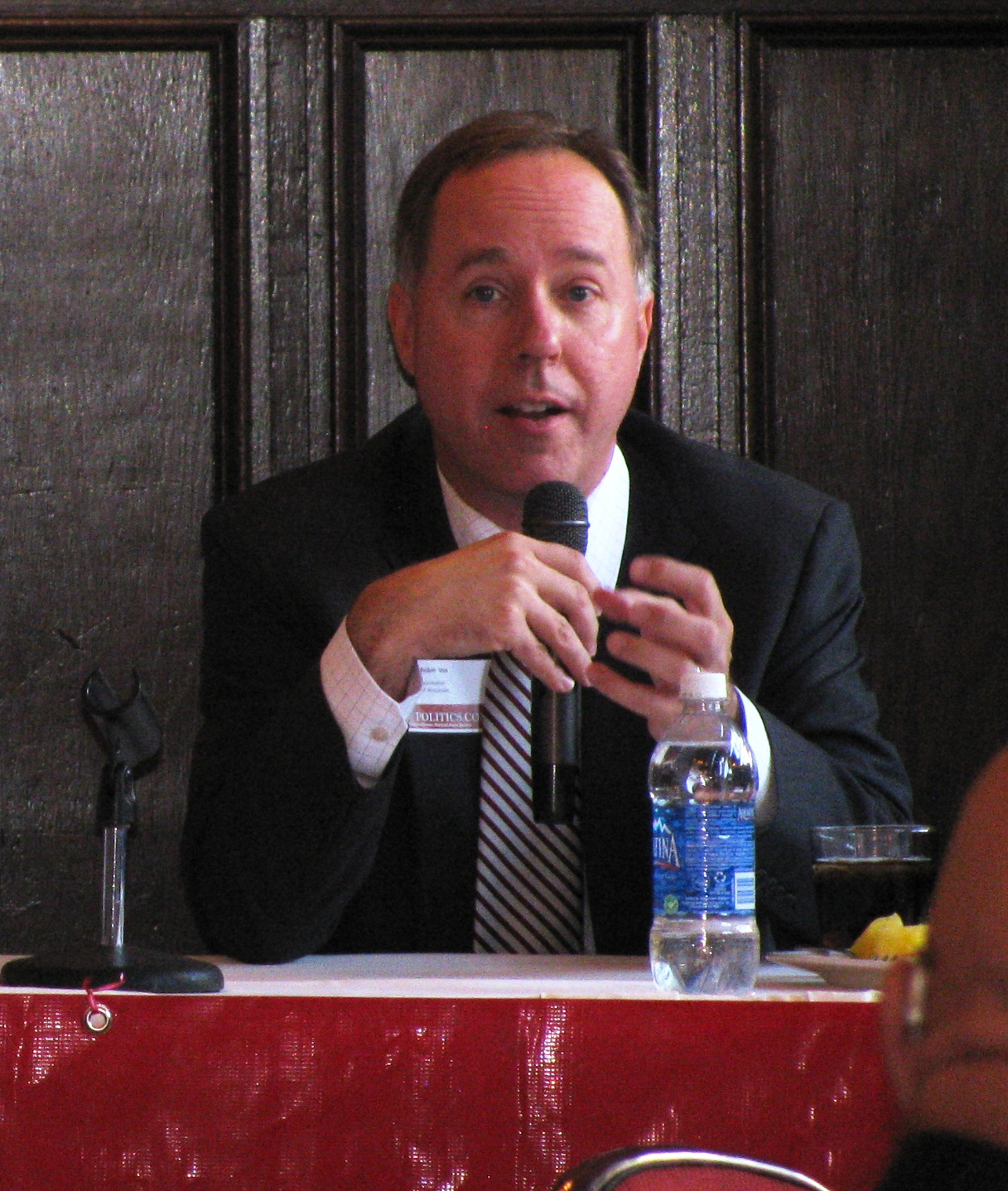
Vos in 2011

In 2004, Vos ran for the Wisconsin state assembly to succeed Ladwig in the 63rd district. He was unopposed in the 2004 primary and general elections.

After Republicans won full control of state government in Wisconsin in 2010, Vos rose to prominence pushing the controversial budget restructuring act alongside governor Scott Walker. The law curtailed collective bargaining rights and public education funding in Wisconsin, and led to massive protests around the state, culminating in the failed 2012 Wisconsin gubernatorial recall election.

In 2013, Vos was elected speaker of the Wisconsin assembly. Between 2014 and 2018 he received about $57,000 in travel and perks from lobbyists and organizations. He said he was certain he had followed ethics rules with his travel. Vos supports deregulating the payday loan industry. He opposes Medicaid expansion and spearheaded Republican efforts to block Medicaid expansion in Wisconsin. Vos argued against Medicaid, saying "Trapping people in the life of poverty is not something that there's ever the right amount of money to do."

In 2016 Vos endorsed Marco Rubio for the Republican nomination for president. After Rubio dropped out of the race, Vos endorsed Ted Cruz. In August 2016, Vos wrote in a column on a conservative website that he was "embarrassed" that Donald Trump was "leading our ticket" as the presumptive Republican nominee; the next month, Vos said that he was "proud" to support Trump's candidacy due to his belief that Trump would energize Republican voters.

Vos served as president of the National Conference of State Legislatures from 2019 to 2021, and again from 2022 to 2023, jointly serving with Scott Bedke during his second tenure.

In February 2019 Vos defended Brian Hagedorn, a judge of the Wisconsin Court of Appeals running for a seat on the Wisconsin Supreme Court, amid reports that Hagedorn had founded a school in 2016 that allowed for the expulsion of students and faculty if they were gay. Vos said he believed Hagedorn could rule fairly on LGBT issues.

In July 2019 Vos was widely criticized for refusing to prohibit overnight floor sessions or allow Democratic lawmaker Jimmy Anderson, who is paralyzed and uses a wheelchair, to phone into committee meetings. He later accused Anderson of political grandstanding and attempting to sabotage him as Vos took on his new national role as head of the National Conference of State Legislatures.

In November 2020, Vos was reelected by 16 percentage points.

After Joe Biden won the 2020 election and Donald Trump refused to concede while making claims of fraud, Vos appropriated $680,000 in taxpayer money to fund an investigation by Michael Gableman into fraud in the 2020 election. Gableman's appointment came a day after Trump had accused Vos of participating in a coverup of the election. In March 2022, Gableman released a report rife with false claims of fraud and conspiracy theories. Vos fired Gableman in August 2022, three days after a primary election in which Gableman had endorsed Vos's challenger. At the time of his firing, Gableman's investigation had already cost Wisconsin taxpayers more than $1,000,000, but the costs continued to rise, climbing close to $2.5 million, as lawsuits related to the practices of his investigation continued more than six months later.

In February 2021, Vos sent the governor a letter asking him to order that flags on state buildings be lowered in honor of right-wing radio host Rush Limbaugh, who had recently died. Lauded by conservatives, Limbaugh was a divisive figure criticized for his derogatory comments about women, racial minorities, and LGBT people, as well as on-air promotion of conspiracy theories and falsehoods. Vos called Limbaugh "a pioneer in talk radio, a best-selling author and a commentator who inspired generations to become active in politics".

In October 2021, Vos defended a heavily pro-Republican gerrymandered redistricting map for Wisconsin. 63 of the 99 Assembly seats and 23 of the 33 Senate seats in the map leaned toward Republicans.

=== Curbing the powers of the Evers administration ===
Vos has been described as having a significant role in obstructing Governor Tony Evers. After Evers, the Democratic nominee, won the 2018 Wisconsin gubernatorial election, defeating incumbent governor Scott Walker, Vos was the first public official to propose curbing the incoming governor's powers. He claimed it was to restore a balance of power between the governor and the legislature, despite having previously voted to expand gubernatorial power. Vos also said the changes were intended to lock in laws passed by Republicans and to prevent the incoming Democratic administration from fulfilling its campaign pledges, particularly a pledge to withdraw Wisconsin from a lawsuit seeking to overturn the federal Affordable Care Act. The Republican-led legislature was called into a December lame duck session and passed laws decreasing the powers of the incoming governor, limiting early voting, and giving the legislature more control. Walker then signed the bills.

Christopher Beem of the McCourtney Institute of Democracy at Pennsylvania State University described Wisconsin Republicans' power grab as a "deeply undemocratic act" that, while possibly legal, eroded democratic norms by frustrating the expressed will of a majority of the electorate, immediately after an election, to make it "more difficult for the incoming administration to undertake actions that the majority has just shown that it wants." In June 2019, the Wisconsin Supreme Court rejected a challenge brought by the League of Women Voters and other groups to the laws enacted in the December 2018 lame-duck session, ruling in a 4–3 decision that extraordinary sessions are constitutional.

In 2021, Politico wrote that Vos was effectively a shadow governor of Wisconsin as he and the Republican majority in the state senate had used their powers "to block, thwart or resist almost every significant move made by Democratic Gov. Tony Evers."

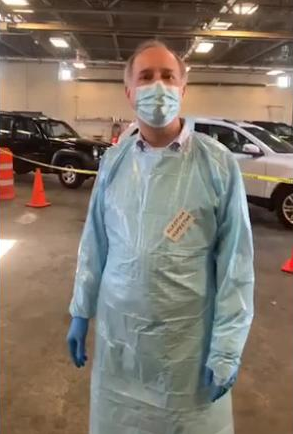
Robin Vos on election day during the COVID-19 pandemic

=== COVID-19 pandemic ===
In April 2020, amid the coronavirus pandemic, Vos opposed calls by Wisconsin Governor Tony Evers, a Democrat, to delay the state's primary election from early April to late May, to make it a mail-in election, and to mail ballots to all registered voters. The legislature adjourned without taking action on any of those proposals. When the governor then issued a last-minute emergency order to suspend in-person voting, Vos and the state senate majority leader appealed the order to the state supreme court, which overturned it, and the election was held as scheduled. Due to the coronavirus pandemic, it was estimated that many voters would be effectively disenfranchised, and in-person voting was also considered a public health risk. According to the Milwaukee Journal Sentinel, "Vos had no answer to how local election officials are supposed to keep people safe as a massive shortage of poll workers has resulted in the closure or reduction of polling locations, forcing more people to vote at a single site." Vos said, "If you are bored at home and sick of watching Netflix, volunteer to go and help at the polls."

On election day, Vos served as an election inspector. While dressed in full-body personal protective equipment, he said it was "incredibly safe" to vote at the polls. Vos later clarified that the city he was volunteering for required that he wear the protective equipment.

Because the Republican-controlled Wisconsin Legislature did not timely waive a requirement that unemployed Wisconsinites wait a week before they can be reimbursed unemployment benefits, Wisconsin lost $25 million in federal funding from the CARES Act. Vos and Senate Majority Leader Scott Fitzgerald had been warned that this would happen if the waiver was not passed in time.

In October 2020, during the pandemic, Vos and Fitzgerald filed a brief in support of a lawsuit by the right-wing law firm Wisconsin Institute for Law and Liberty that sought to block a statewide mandate, issued by Governor Evers, requiring the wearing of face masks in indoor public places to prevent the spread of the virus. Evers issued the mandate at a time when cases and hospitalizations in Wisconsin were surging, straining the state's hospital systems. The legislature could have convened a session to terminate the health emergency declaration and strike down Evers's mandate, but Wisconsin Republicans opted to go to court instead, so as to prevent vulnerable Republican legislators from having to vote against face mask mandates just before an election. A state judge rejected the attempt to strike down Evers's order, finding that state law "gives the governor broad discretion to act whenever conditions in the state constitute a public health emergency" and considering the fact that "The legislature can end the state of emergency at any time, but so far, it has declined to do so."

In March 2021, after Congress passed a $1.9 trillion COVID-relief stimulus package, Vos suggested that Wisconsin should reject the federal government's assistance to provide the unemployed with unemployment benefits for their first week of unemployment.

In November 2021, Vos said that members of the bipartisan Wisconsin Elections Commission (WEC) should "probably" face felony charges for easing some of the regulations around voting in nursing homes during the COVID-19 pandemic.

Vos opposes vaccine requirements for private businesses' employees and customers. In December 2021, he criticized vaccine requirements for health care workers, blaming the requirements for bed shortages at hospitals.

In 48 states, new mothers can enroll in Medicaid for health care coverage for a year after giving birth; only Wisconsin and Arkansas limit postpartum maternal health care to 60 days. Vos has refused to allow an Assembly vote to expand coverage despite bipartisan support for a bill that has passed the state senate.

=== False claims of election fraud ===
In November 2020, days after the unofficial count showed Joe Biden winning Wisconsin in the 2020 presidential election by 20,000 votes, Vos directed an investigatory committee to review how the election was administered. This came as Trump made false claims of election fraud. Vos also made misleading claims about the election process. In May 2021, Vos appropriated $680,000 in taxpayer money to fund an investigation by Michael Gableman into fraud in the 2020 election; there was no evidence of substantial fraud in the election and all lawsuits that claimed fraud were dismissed by courts. When asked whether it was a conspiracy theory that the 2020 election was stolen, Vos said it was not.

Gableman released his interim report in March 2022. The report endorsed numerous debunked claims of fraud and conspiracy theories. It also made false assertions about lawmakers' power to decertify Biden's victory. Gableman's report cited The Gateway Pundit, a far-right conspiracy website. Wisconsin Governor Tony Evers called the report "a colossal waste of taxpayer dollars". Shortly after the report's release, Vos signed a new contract with Gableman to extend his investigation. At the same time, both Trump and Gableman criticized Vos for not supporting decertification of Biden's victory, and both endorsed his primary opponent. The August 2022 primary was the closest race of Vos's career: he defeated election denier and Christian nationalist Adam Steen by fewer than 300 votes. Donald Trump endorsed Steen after Vos refused to fully support unsubstantiated claims that the 2020 presidential election was stolen. Three days after winning the primary, Vos fired Gableman, calling him "an embarrassment to the state".

=== Attempts to nullify the 2023 Supreme Court election ===
Janet Protasiewicz won the 2023 Wisconsin Supreme Court election, giving liberals a majority on the Wisconsin Supreme Court for the first time since 2008. Less than a month after she assumed office, Vos began leading calls to impeach her, using the Legislature's large Republican majorities. Vos claimed Protasiewicz had prejudged important upcoming cases on legislative gerrymandering and abortion, and therefore had to recuse from those cases or be subject to impeachment.

Several parties also referred the matter to the Wisconsin Judicial Commission, which typically would handle such complaints. The Wisconsin Supreme Court had previously adopted narrow recusal rules, approved by the conservative justices who were then the majority, and the legislature declined to write broader recusal rules into law. The Judicial Commission therefore dismissed all the complaints against Protasiewicz. Vos has said that he does not believe the commission's ruling settled the issue, and may still pursue impeachment.

The situation prompted intense backlash, with state and national Democrats accusing Vos of attempting to throw out the 2023 election. The Democratic Party of Wisconsin began a $4 million campaign to pressure Assembly Republicans to go on record about their position on impeachment. After a week of that campaign, Vos appeared to back down from his impeachment threat, and instead suggested that the legislature would take up a package of redistricting reforms, possibly including the implementation of a nonpartisan redistricting commission. He then unveiled a bill he said he would attempt to pass within 48 hours. Governor Evers greeted the proposal with skepticism, and a reading of the legislative text validated his concerns. The new bill included no safeguards to prevent the legislature from ignoring or overruling the commission by simple majority vote and entirely removed the Wisconsin Supreme Court's jurisdiction over redistricting cases.

Vos subsequently announced that he had convened a special advisory panel of former Wisconsin Supreme Court judges—including former Republican speaker David Prosser Jr.—to help him form a rationale for impeaching Protasiewicz. This resulted in another lawsuit against Vos for additional violations of the state open meetings laws. Two weeks later, Prosser wrote to Vos that impeachment was not warranted for Protasiewicz, saying that impeachment must be reserved for criminality or serious corruption. Prosser was soon joined by another member of the panel, former justice Jon P. Wilcox, who agreed that impeachment would not be appropriate. With these two justices publicly opposed to impeachment, the impeachment threats against Protasiewicz began to recede.

=== Wisconsin Elections Commission impeachment threats ===
As the threats against Protasiewicz were receding, talk of another impeachment heated up. Meagan Wolfe, the administrator of the Wisconsin Elections Commission, became a target of right-wing conspiracy theories after the 2020 election. The administrator—who is appointed by the six member elections commission—really has no role in running Wisconsin elections, as all elections are managed by local clerks. Her primary role is to issue non-binding advisory opinions to the local clerks on questions about the law or the decisions voted on by the six elections commissioners.

Since the commission, by design, is evenly divided between Republicans and Democrats, state Republicans hoped that they would be able to remove Wolfe by renominating her for a new term as administrator and then having the Wisconsin Senate vote to reject her nomination. Democrats decided to use the recent Wisconsin Supreme Court case Kaul v. Prehn, in which the court held that an officeholder could remain in office indefinitely after their term expires until a successor is properly nominated and confirmed. Democrats thus refused to vote for Wolfe's renomination, denying a majority for renomination. Senate Republicans voted to "deem" Wolfe nominated and then proceeded to vote their disapproval, but Wisconsin Attorney General Josh Kaul directed Wolfe to ignore the Senate's vote as illegitimate. Kaul sued in state court to clarify Wolfe's legal status, after which lawyers for legislative Republicans admitted that their vote of disapproval had been merely "symbolic".

As the senate confirmation process no longer seemed viable, State Representative Janel Brandtjen began circulating articles of impeachment against Wolfe. Vos initially appeared hesitant to enter into another impeachment controversy so soon after the public rebuke from his judicial advisors over the idea of impeaching Protasiewicz. In late October, a right-wing PAC, "Wisconsin Elections Committee", purchased $80,000 of television advertisements in southeast Wisconsin that threatened Vos with a recall and primary challenge, specifically tying their campaign to their desire to see Wolfe impeached. The PAC appeared to have ties to former justice Michael Gableman, who had previewed many of the group's demands a week earlier, echoing Brandtjen's calls to see her articles of impeachment referred to committee. Brandtjen and Gableman both had significant personal grievances with Vos in addition to their interest in perpetuating 2020 election conspiracies. Vos had hired Gableman to investigate the 2020 election and then fired him after the 2022 primary elections; Brantjen had been barred from the Republican Assembly caucus meetings and stripped of her committee chairmanship after an earlier clash with Vos. Hours after the pressure campaign was publicly announced, Vos took steps to move forward with the impeachment, referring the proposal to the Assembly Committee on Government Accountability and Oversight.

=== 2024 recall attempts ===
Right-wing anger at Vos (fueled both by the failure to impeach Wolfe and by Vos's refusal to hold a vote to "decertify" Joe Biden's 2020 presidential election victory in the state) resulted in two efforts to trigger recall elections.

In January 2024, Burlington resident Matthew Snorek filed paperwork to recall Vos. In the paperwork, Snorek listed his grievances against Vos, writing: "Vos is blocking fair elections in WI. Vos misled the WI Assembly in the impeachment of Megan [sic] Wolfe. Vos said he will 'try as hard as I can to make sure Donald Trump is not the nominee in 2024'. Vos supported the unlawful drop boxes. Wisconsin must move 'forward' without Robin Vos in power." Many of the people involved in supporting the recall were the same people involved in the primary challenge against Vos in 2022 and the ad campaign against him in the winter of 2023–24, including Gableman and Brandtjen. During the recall petition signature-collection phase, the Wisconsin Elections Commission recommended felony charges against Brandtjen and a Donald Trump super PAC for laundering donations to Vos's 2022 primary opponent.

In the first half of 2024, the two groups behind these efforts spent more than $1.5 million toward this aim. Both efforts' petitions for recall elections were rejected by the Wisconsin Elections Commission. Wolfe (herself the commission's administrator) is not a voting member of the commission.

The first recalled attempt failed because not enough of the signatures collected were from people living in the newly constituted 33rd assembly district, which Vos had been redistricted into under the election map adopted after Clarke v. Wisconsin Elections Commission. The election commission rejected the first effort's petition in a unanimous 5–0 vote.

After the initial recall's apparent failure, another recall campaign was quickly announced. Vos became more outspoken in his criticism of recall organizers, saying: "The people who organized this are so out of touch with reality. They are morons. They are stupid. These people do not deserve the respect that anybody gave them in the media over the course of the last three, three months." Vos also singled out his former ally, Gableman, who he alleged was the leader of the recall. Vos called his hiring Gableman "probably the single biggest embarrassment that I have ever had" and said Gableman should be disbarred. The second attempt was rejected by a 4–2 vote of the Elections Commission, which disqualified many signatures that it ruled were collected after the deadline. The commission that voted to reject this petition had three Republican members and one Democrat. Dane County Judge Stephen Ehlke rejected an appeal by the committee behind the second recall effort.

=== Retirement ===
Vos suffered a minor heart attack in November 2025 and disclosed it on February 19, 2026. In the same speech, he announced that he would not run for reelection in 2026 and would retire at the end of the 107th Legislature.

== Memberships ==
Vos is second vice-chair of the board of directors of the State Legislative Leaders Foundation. A member of the American Legislative Exchange Council (ALEC), he is the group's former Wisconsin state chair.

== Electoral history ==
=== Wisconsin Assembly, 63rd district (2004–2022) ===
Year	Election	Date	Elected				Defeated				Total	Plurality
2004	General	Nov. 2	Robin Vos	Republican	23,682	99.37%	--Unopposed--				23,831	23,533
2006	General	Nov. 7	Robin Vos (inc.)	Republican	14,329	58.16%	Tim Daley	Dem.	10,304	41.82%	24,637	4,025
2008	General	Nov. 4	Robin Vos (inc.)	Republican	20,172	61.51%	Linda Flashinski	Dem.	12,609	38.45%	32,794	7,563
2010	General	Nov. 2	Robin Vos (inc.)	Republican	19,525	99.35%	--Unopposed--				19,653	19,397
2012	General	Nov. 6	Robin Vos (inc.)	Republican	17,704	58.31%	Kelley Albrecht	Dem.	12,637	41.62%	30,362	5,067
2014	Primary	Aug. 26	Robin Vos (inc.)	Republican	4,594	89.45%	Bryn Biemeck	Rep.	540	10.51%	5,136	4,054
2014	General	Nov. 4	Robin Vos (inc.)	Republican	15,361	63.23%	Andy Mitchell	Dem.	8,917	36.70%	24,295	6,444
2016	General	Nov. 8	Robin Vos (inc.)	Republican	18,771	64.16%	Andy Mitchell	Dem.	10,487	35.84%	29,258	8,284
2018	General	Nov. 6	Robin Vos (inc.)	Republican	16,775	61.00%	Joel Jacobsen	Dem.	10,705	38.93%	27,499	6,070
2020	General	Nov. 3	Robin Vos (inc.)	Republican	19,919	58.44%	Joel Jacobsen	Dem.	14,132	41.46%	34,087	5,787
2022	Primary	Aug. 9	Robin Vos (inc.)	Republican	5,084	51.29%	Adam Steen	Rep.	4,824	48.66%	9,908	260
2022	General	Nov. 8	Robin Vos (inc.)	Republican	16,977	72.98%	Joel Jacobsen (write-in)	Dem.	3,495	15.02%	23,262	13,482
2022	General	Nov. 8	Robin Vos (inc.)	Republican	16,977	72.98%	Adam Steen (write-in)	Rep.	2,112	9.08%	23,262	13,482

=== Wisconsin Assembly, 33rd district (2024) ===
Year	Election	Date	Elected				Defeated				Total	Plurality
2024	Primary	Aug. 13	Robin Vos	Republican	5,368	69.00%	Andrew Cegielski (withdrawn)	Rep.	2,390	30.72%	7,780	2,978
2024	General	Nov. 5	Robin Vos	Republican	20,555	56.97%	Alan Kupsik	Dem.	10,739	29.76%	36,083	9,816
2024	General	Nov. 5	Robin Vos	Republican	20,555	56.97%	Kelly Clark	Ind.	4,743	13.14%	36,083	9,816

== Notes ==
Political offices
Preceded by Jeff Fitzgerald	Speaker of the Wisconsin State Assembly; 2013–present	Incumbent
