= John H. Robinson (politician) =

American mayor, Wisconsin

40th Mayor of Wausau, Wisconsin
- In office April 19, 1988 – April 1992
- Preceded by: John Kannenberg
- Succeeded by: John D. Hess

Member of the Wisconsin State Assembly
- In office January 7, 1985 – May 23, 1988
- Preceded by: Francis R. Byers
- Succeeded by: Gregory Huber
- Constituency: 85th district
- In office January 3, 1983 – January 7, 1985
- Preceded by: E. James Ladwig
- Succeeded by: E. James Ladwig
- Constituency: 63rd district
- In office January 5, 1981 – January 3, 1983
- Preceded by: Edward F. McClain
- Succeeded by: Francis R. Byers
- Constituency: 85th district

Member of the Board of Supervisors of Marathon County, Wisconsin
- Incumbent
- Assumed office 2006
- In office 1974–1981

Member of the Wausau City Council
- In office 1974–1981

Personal details
- Born: July 25, 1955 (age 70) Wausau, Wisconsin, U.S.
- Party: Democratic
- Spouse: Mary
- Children: 3

John H. Robinson (born July 25, 1955) is an American politician and businessman. He was the 40th Mayor of Wausau, Wisconsin, and represented Wausau for four terms in the Wisconsin State Assembly. He currently serves on the Marathon County Board of Supervisors.

== Biography ==
Born in Wausau, Wisconsin, Robinson graduated from Newman Catholic High School. He went to University of Wisconsin–Marathon County and University of Wisconsin–Stevens Point, where he studied political science.

In 1974, at age 18, he was elected to the Wausau City Council and the Marathon County Board, the youngest person ever elected to either organization. He served on the City Council and County Board until his election to the Wisconsin State Assembly.

In 1980, he won the open seat in the 85th Assembly District. He was re-elected in 1982, 1984, and 1986. In 1988 he resigned his seat in the Assembly after he was elected to a four-year term as Mayor of Wausau.

After being cited for failing to report a single-car accident, Robinson chose not to seek re-election in 1992.

After leaving the Mayor's office, he worked in insurance and environmental projects, including projects for the Wisconsin Department of Natural Resources.

In 2006, Robinson returned to elected office, winning a seat on the Marathon County Board of Supervisors.

== Personal life ==
Robinson and his wife, Mary, live in Wausau. They have three adult children and five grandchildren.

== Electoral history ==
=== Wisconsin Assembly, 85th district (1980) ===
Wisconsin Assembly, 85th District Election, 1980
Party	Candidate	Votes	%	±%
Democratic Primary, September 9, 1980
Democratic	John H. Robinson	1,808	51.95%	
Democratic	Rosalie LaRocque	968	27.82%	
Democratic	David G. Lincoln	704	20.23%	
Total votes		6,114	100.0%	
General Election, November 4, 1980
Democratic	John H. Robinson	11,026	51.49%	
Republican	Kay B. Smith	10,387	48.51%	
Total votes		21,413	100.0%	
Democratic hold				

=== Wisconsin Assembly, 63rd district (1982) ===
Wisconsin Assembly, 63rd District Election, 1982
Party	Candidate	Votes	%	±%
Democratic	John H. Robinson	8,733	53.79%	
Republican	John L. McEwen	7,503	46.21%	
Total votes		16,236	100.0%	
Democratic gain from Republican				

=== Wisconsin Assembly, 85th district (1984, 1986) ===
Wisconsin Assembly, 85th District Election, 1984
Party	Candidate	Votes	%	±%
Democratic	John H. Robinson	13,452	60.79%	
Republican	Patrick D. Braatz	8,678	39.21%	
Total votes		22,130	100.0%	
Democratic gain from Republican				

Wisconsin Assembly, 85th District Election, 1986
Party	Candidate	Votes	%	±%
Democratic	John H. Robinson (incumbent)	10,868	63.39%	+2.60%
Republican	Robert J. Gwidt	6,278	36.62%	
Total votes		17,146	100.0%	-22.52%
Democratic hold				

== See also ==
- List of mayors of Wausau, Wisconsin

Wisconsin State Assembly
Preceded by Edward F. McClain	Member of the Wisconsin State Assembly from the 85th district January 5, 1981 – January 3, 1983	Succeeded by Francis R. Byers
Preceded by E. James Ladwig	Member of the Wisconsin State Assembly from the 63rd district January 3, 1983 – January 7, 1985	Succeeded by E. James Ladwig
Preceded by Francis R. Byers	Member of the Wisconsin State Assembly from the 85th district January 7, 1985 – April 1988	Succeeded by Gregory Huber
Political offices
Preceded by John Kannenberg	Mayor of Wausau, Wisconsin; April 19, 1988 – April 1992	Succeeded by John D. Hess
