= Patrick Snyder =

21st century American politician

Member of the Wisconsin State Assembly from the 85th district
- Incumbent
- Assumed office January 3, 2017
- Preceded by: Dave Heaton

Member of the City Council of Schofield, Wisconsin
- In office May 2015 – 2017

Personal details
- Born: October 10, 1956 (age 70) Boone, Iowa, U.S.
- Party: Republican
- Spouse: Shawn
- Children: 2
- Education: University of Iowa (BA)
- Occupation: Radio host, politician

Patrick James Snyder (born October 10, 1956) is an American Republican politician and former radio host from Schofield, Wisconsin. He is a member of the Wisconsin State Assembly, representing Wisconsin's 85th Assembly district since 2017. He also previously served as a member of the Schofield City Council, and worked as a legislative aide to U.S. Representative Sean Duffy.

== Early life and education ==
Patrick Snyder was born in Boone, Iowa, in October 1956. He spent much of his youth in Milwaukee, Wisconsin, but graduated from Oelwein Community High School in Oelwein, Iowa, in 1974. He went on to attend the University of Iowa, where he earned his bachelor's degree in communications in 1978.

== Political career ==
After returning to Wisconsin in 2000, Snyder was hired as an on-air radio host for WSAU (AM) in Wausau, Wisconsin. During these years he settled in Schofield, Wisconsin, just outside of Wausau. He worked twelve years in radio before announcing in 2012 that he would leave the radio station to run for Wisconsin State Assembly as a Republican in the 85th Assembly district. The 85th district incumbent, Democrat Donna J. Seidel, had announced her plans to retire, creating an open seat opportunity. Snyder faced no opposition in the primary and went on to face Democratic grade school teacher Mandy Wright in the general election. The 85th district was one of the closest general election races in the state that year, but Snyder fell 900 votes short, receiving 46.5% to Wright's 49.7%.

After losing the 2012 election, Snyder was hired as a district representative by his representative in Congress, Sean Duffy. While working for Duffy, Snyder ran for Schofield City Council in April 2015, challenging 16-year incumbent Jim DeBauchen. DeBauchen won the election with 57 votes to Snyder's 31. After the election, the new mayor Kregg Hoehn, vacated his seat in the city council, and Snyder was appointed as his replacement.

In January 2016, incumbent state representative Dave Heaton, who had defeated Mandy Wright in the 2014 election, announced he would not run for re-election. Snyder entered the race to succeed him in the Assembly; he again faced no opposition in the primary and a general election rematch with Mandy Wright, who was seeking to return to office. This time Snyder prevailed by a healthy margin, boosted by rural turnout for Republican Party presidential candidate Donald Trump. Snyder went on to win re-election in 2018 and 2020 by nearly identical margins, receiving 55% in both elections.

After the 2020 United States census, the Wisconsin Legislature and governor were unable to compromise on a new legislative map and the issue was sent to the Wisconsin Supreme Court. The new map significantly redrew the 85th Assembly district, adding more of southeast Marathon County to the district and removing suburban areas nearer to Wausau. Snyder won re-election on the new map by a slightly improved margin, receiving 56% of the vote.

In 2023, the majority of the Wisconsin Supreme Court flipped due to the election of justice Janet Protasiewicz. The new court took up a new redistricting lawsuit in 2023 and struck down the legislative maps that the Court had adopted in 2022. Under pressure from the court, the Legislature and governor agreed on a new map in early 2024. The new map returned the 85th Assembly district to something closer to its shape prior to 2022, but removed Snyder's home, Schofield, from the district. Snyder accused Democratic governor Tony Evers of gerrymandering him out of his district. Under the new map, Snyder resided in the 87th Assembly district, along with fellow Republican incumbent James W. Edming. Rather than running for election in the new district, Snyder announced he would rent an apartment in Wausau in order to maintain residency in the district.

Under the new maps, the 85th Assembly district is projected to be one of the most competitive districts in the state. In the general election, Snyder defeated Democratic county supervisor Yee Leng Xiong, a leader in Wausau's Hmong community.

The district was also at the middle of a controversy over ballot drop boxes—optional stationery bins similar to mail boxes offered for voters to drop off their completed absentee ballots prior to election day. New Wausau mayor Doug Diny had campaigned against the use of ballot drop boxes, but he had no direct authority over the program. The city clerk, Kaitlyn Bernarde, supported by the city council president, decided to implement a new ballot drop box outside Wausau's city hall. Within 24 hours, Diny personally removed the drop box from the grounds. After a series of accusations, a new drop box was installed a week later and bolted to the ground. The incident is being investigated by the sheriff's department from neighboring Portage County. Snyder's 2024 Democratic opponent, Xiong, noted that Snyder contributed to Diny's campaign; he has called on Snyder to denounce Diny for his unilateral action.

In 2026 Snyder was defeated for re-election by Democrat John Kroll.

== Personal life and family ==
Patrick Snyder married his wife, Shawn, in 1980; she works as a registered nurse. They have two adult children. His daughter works as a legislative aide for a democratic Wisconsin State Assembly member.

== Electoral history ==
=== Wisconsin Assembly (2012) ===
Year	Election	Date	Elected				Defeated				Total	Plurality
2012	General	Nov. 6	Mandy Wright	Democratic	13,930	49.70%	Patrick Snyder	Rep.	13,025	46.47%	28,026	905
2012	General	Nov. 6	Mandy Wright	Democratic	13,930	49.70%	Jim Maas	Ind.	1,047	3.74%	28,026	905

=== Wisconsin Assembly (2016–present) ===
Year	Election	Date	Elected				Defeated				Total	Plurality
2016	General	Nov. 8	Patrick Snyder	Republican	14,722	53.35%	Mandy Wright	Dem.	12,837	46.52%	27,594	1,885
2018	General	Nov. 6	Patrick Snyder (inc)	Republican	13,791	55.25%	Alyson Leahy	Dem.	11,150	44.67%	24,962	2,641
2020	General	Nov. 3	Patrick Snyder (inc)	Republican	16,599	55.09%	Jeff Johnson	Dem.	13,515	44.85%	30,132	3,084
2022	General	Nov. 8	Patrick Snyder (inc)	Republican	13,689	56.20%	Kristin Conway	Dem.	10,659	43.76%	24,358	3,030
2024	General	Nov. 5	Patrick Snyder (inc)	Republican	15,636	53.17%	Yee Leng Xiong	Dem.	13,736	46.71%	29,410	1,900

Wisconsin State Assembly
Preceded by Dave Heaton	Member of the Wisconsin State Assembly from the 85th district January 3, 2017 – present	Incumbent
