= Bubolz =

Bubolz is a surname. Notable people with the surname include:

- Gordon A. Bubolz (1905–1990), American politician
- Ulrich Bubolz (born 1981), German field hockey player
