= Wisconsin's 40th Assembly district =

American legislative district in central Wisconsin

Wisconsin's 40th State Assembly district
- 2024 map defined in 2023 Wisc. Act 94; 2022 map defined in Johnson v. Wisconsin Elections Commission; 2011 map was defined in 2011 Wisc. Act 43
Assemblymember
Karen DeSanto; D–Baraboo
since January 6, 2025 (1 years)
- Demographics: 90.56% White; 2.1% Black; 3.83% Hispanic; 0.94% Asian; 1.74% Native American; 0.08% Hawaiian/Pacific Islander
- Population (2020) • Voting age: 59,478; 47,068
- Website: Official website
- Notes: Central Wisconsin

The 40th Assembly district of Wisconsin is one of 99 districts in the Wisconsin State Assembly. Located in central Wisconsin, the district comprises parts of northern Columbia County and eastern and southern Sauk County. It includes the cities of Baraboo, Portage, Prairie du Sac, and Sauk City, and the villages of Merrimac, Pardeeville, Plain, Spring Green, and West Baraboo. The district also contains Devil's Lake State Park and Natural Bridge State Park. The district is represented by Democrat Karen DeSanto, since January 2025.

The 40th Assembly district is located within Wisconsin's 14th Senate district, along with the 41st and 42nd Assembly districts.

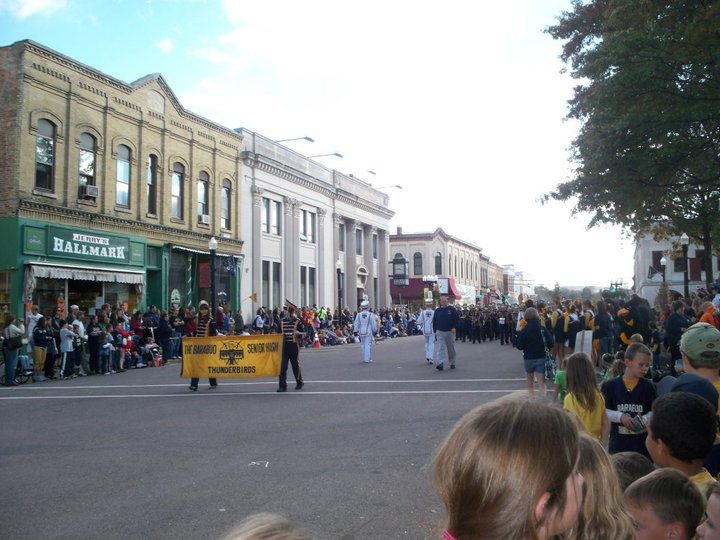
Baraboo, Wisconsin

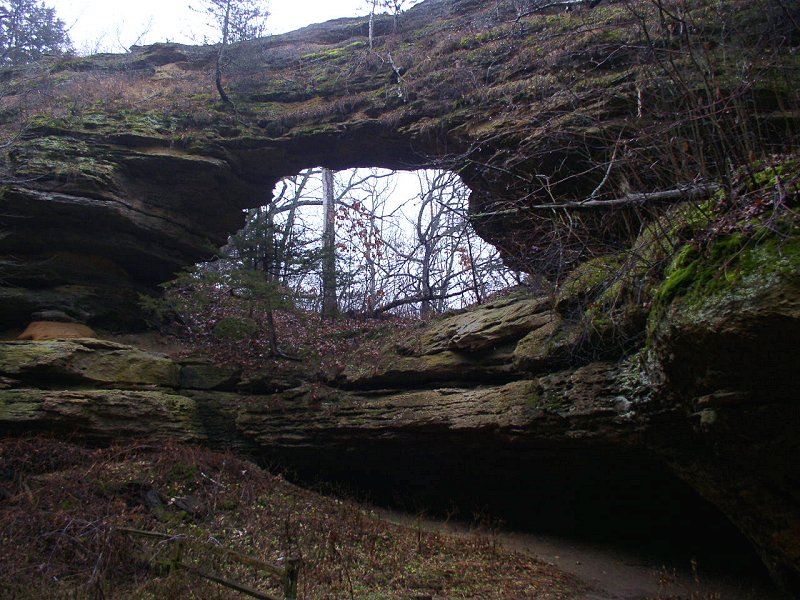
Natural Bridge State Park

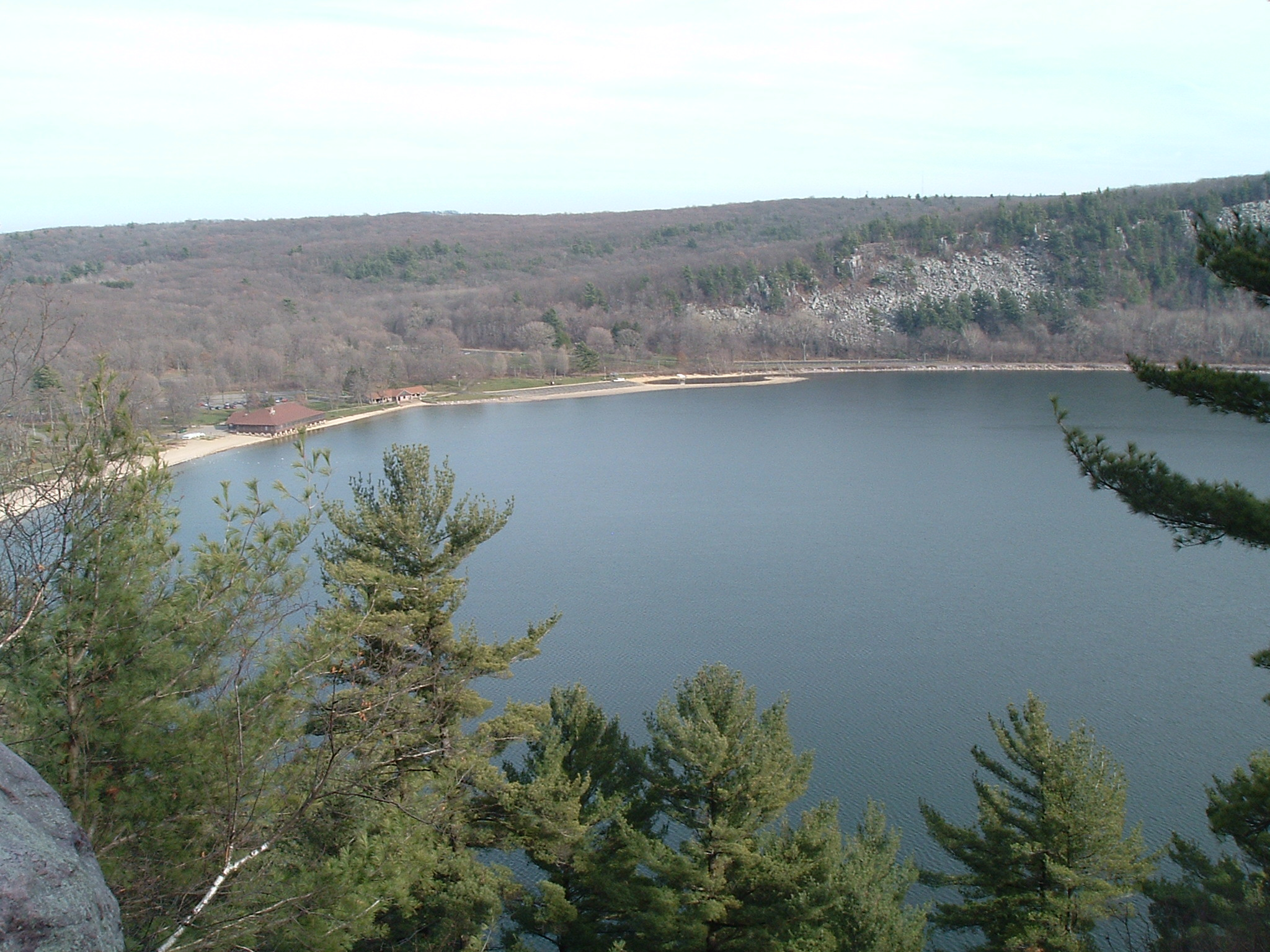
Devil's Lake State Park

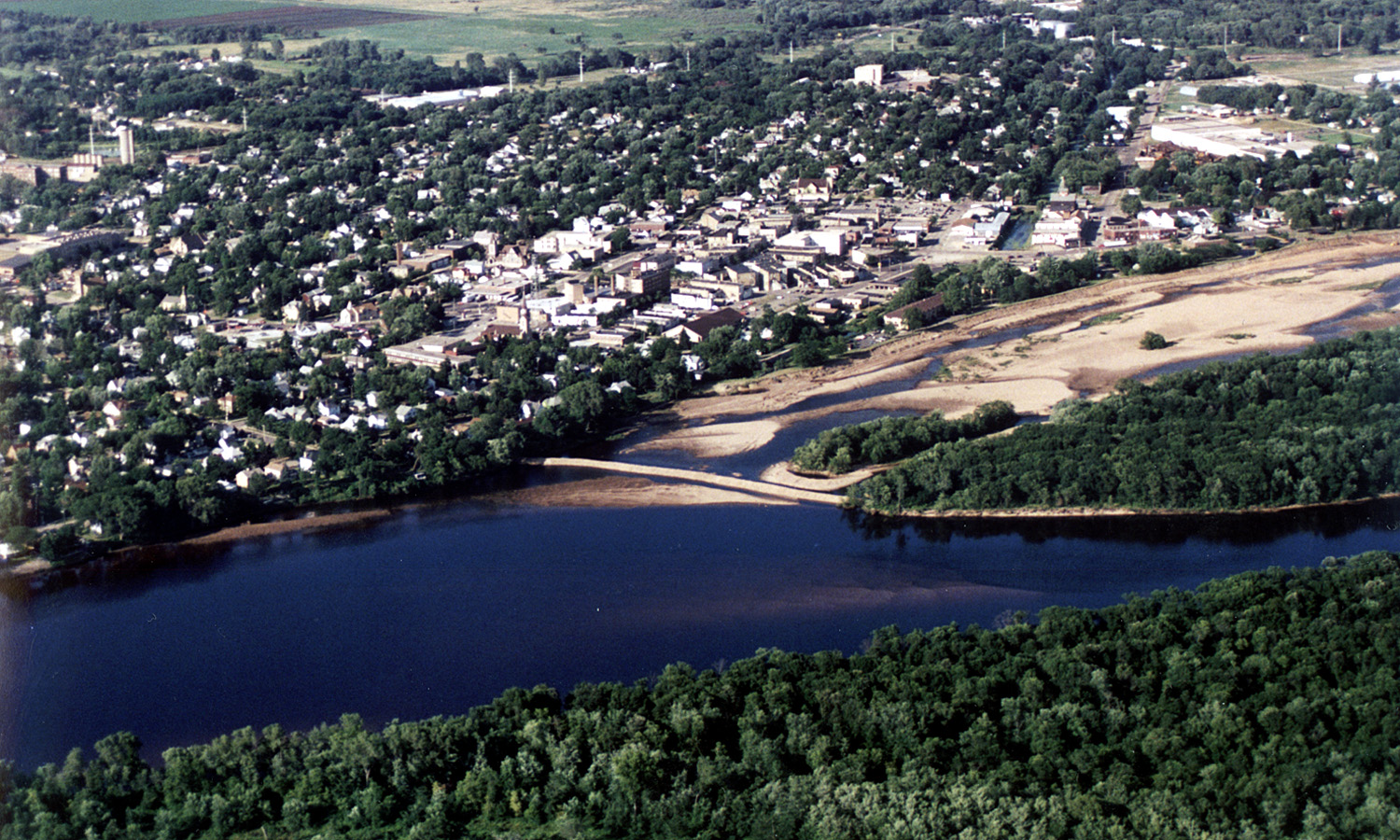
Aerial view of Portage

== List of past representatives ==
List of representatives to the Wisconsin State Assembly from the 40th district
Member	Party	Residence	Counties represented	Term start	Term end	Ref.
District created
Francis R. Byers	Rep.	Marion	Outagamie, Shawano, Waupaca	January 1, 1973	January 3, 1983	
Earl Gilson	Dem.	River Falls	Pierce, St. Croix	January 3, 1983	January 7, 1985	
Francis R. Byers	Rep.	Marion	Outagamie, Waupaca	January 7, 1985	January 2, 1989	
William Lorge	Rep.	Deer Creek	Outagamie, Waupaca	January 2, 1989	January 4, 1999	
Jean Hundertmark	Rep.	Clintonville	Outagamie, Waupaca	January 4, 1999	January 1, 2007	
Kevin D. Petersen	Rep.	Waupaca	Waupaca, Waushara	January 1, 2007	January 6, 2025	
Kevin D. Petersen	Rep.	Waupaca	Outagamie, Waupaca, Waushara	January 1, 2007	January 6, 2025	
Karen DeSanto	Dem.	Baraboo	Columbia, Sauk	January 6, 2025	Current	
