= Gerald Lorge =

American politician (1922–2001)

Gerald D. Lorge

Member of the Wisconsin Senate from the 14th district
- In office January 3, 1955 – January 7, 1985
- Preceded by: Gordon A. Bubolz
- Succeeded by: Joseph Leean

Member of the Wisconsin State Assembly from the Outagamie 2nd district
- In office January 1, 1951 – January 3, 1955
- Preceded by: William M. Rohan
- Succeeded by: William T. Sullivan

Personal details
- Born: July 9, 1922 Bear Creek, Wisconsin, U.S.
- Died: February 14, 2001 (aged 78) Bear Creek, Wisconsin, U.S.
- Resting place: Saint Marys Parish Cemetery, Bear Creek, Wisconsin
- Party: Republican
- Spouse: Christina Cordelia "Tina" Ziegler (m. 1958–2001)
- Children: Robert G. Lorge (b. 1959); William Lorge (b. 1960); Anna, Julie, Christina
- Education: Marquette University (JD)
- Occupation: Lawyer

Military service
- Allegiance: United States
- Branch/service: United States Marine Corps
- Years of service: 1942–1945
- Rank: Master Sergeant
- Unit: Marine Aircraft Group 13, 4th Marine Aircraft Wing
- Battles/wars: World War II: Pacific War

Gerald David Lorge (July 9, 1922 – February 14, 2001) was an American lawyer and Republican politician. He served 30 years in the Wisconsin State Senate, representing Outagamie and Waupaca counties, and earlier served four years in the State Assembly. At the time of his death, he was the fifth longest-serving member of the Wisconsin Senate.

== Early life ==
Born in Bear Creek, Outagamie County, Wisconsin, Lorge graduated from Bear Creek High School and worked briefly at the YMCA before the outbreak of World War II. In 1942, he enlisted for service in the United States Marine Corps and, in 1943, was deployed to the Pacific theater with the 4th Marine Aircraft Wing. In early 1944, he was injured and spent several weeks at a naval hospital on Samoa. Afterward, he was reassigned to San Diego, California, and subsequently received an honorable discharge.

== Career ==
Lorge was one of three Republicans challenging incumbent Assemblymember William M. Rohan in the 1950 primary. Rohan had long been a member of the Democratic Party, but had run as a Republican since 1946, after the collapse of the Wisconsin Progressive Party. Lorge prevailed in the four-way primary, and won the general election with 59% of the vote, with Rohan in the race as an independent candidate. Rohan returned for a head-to-head contest in the 1952 Republican primary, but Lorge prevailed again.

In 1946, he had begun attending Marquette University but did not complete a degree before being elected to the Wisconsin State Assembly. Following the end of the spring 1951 legislative session, however, he returned to Marquette and received his J.D. in 1952. He started a law practice in Bear Creek that year, and was re-elected to the Assembly that Fall.

In 1954, State Senator Gordon A. Bubolz resigned, necessitating a 1954 special election to fill the remaining two years of his term. Lorge won a contested Republican primary and was unopposed in the November election. He was subsequently elected to a full term in 1956, and was re-elected six more times.

After the death of U.S. Senator Joseph McCarthy in 1957, Lorge ran in the Republican primary to serve out the remainder of his term, but came in a distant 6th place.

In 1974, Lorge made another attempt at statewide election, running for Attorney General of Wisconsin. He was unopposed for the Republican nomination, but lost the general election to Bronson La Follette, who was returning to the office he had previously held in the 1960s.

In the 1980s, Wisconsin underwent a painful redistricting process as the Governor and Legislature were unable to agree on a map. The issue was referred to federal courts, and a court-ordered map was implemented in 1982. Prompted by the court's map, which radically altered existing legislative districts, the Legislature came back and agreed on a replacement map in 1983. After these edits, Lorge's 14th State Senate district had been radically redrawn. For the previous 30 years, the district had been anchored on his native Outagamie County and neighboring Waupaca County. In 1983, the district now barely contained any of Outagamie County, and stretched all the way across central Wisconsin to Monroe County.

Rather than run for another term in the new district, Lorge, who was then the most senior member of the State Senate, chose to retire. His son, William, attempted a run in the new Senate district, but was defeated in the Republican primary by Waupaca businessman Joseph Leean.

After leaving the Senate, Lorge made one final bid for elected office in 1985, running for Wisconsin circuit court judge in Outagamie County, but was defeated in the primary.

Lorge devoted more time to his law practice after leaving public office, and welcomed his son, Robert, as a partner in the firm, now known as Lorge & Lorge.

== Personal life ==
He married Christina "Tina" Ziegler in 1958. Together, they had two sons and three daughters. William served five terms in the Wisconsin State Assembly. Robert was the Republican nominee in the 2006 United States Senate election in Wisconsin, but lost to incumbent senator Herb Kohl.

Lorge died at his home in Bear Creek, Wisconsin, in February 2001.

== Electoral history ==
=== Wisconsin Assembly (1950, 1952) ===
Year	Election	Date	Elected				Defeated				Total	Plurality
1950	Primary	Sep. 19	Gerald Lorge	Republican	1,415	41.03%	William M. Rohan (inc.)	Rep.	1,075	31.17%	3,449	340
1950	Primary	Sep. 19	Gerald Lorge	Republican	1,415	41.03%	Gus Hanges	Rep.	580	16.82%	3,449	340
1950	Primary	Sep. 19	Gerald Lorge	Republican	1,415	41.03%	Carl Konrad	Rep.	379	10.99%	3,449	340
1950	General	Nov. 7	Gerald Lorge	Republican	6,106	59.05%	Katherine Sullivan	Dem.	2,306	22.30%	10,340	3,800
1950	General	Nov. 7	Gerald Lorge	Republican	6,106	59.05%	William M. Rohan (inc.)	Ind.	1,928	18.65%	10,340	3,800
1952	Primary	Sep. 9	Gerald Lorge (inc.)	Republican	4,190	59.12%	William M. Rohan	Rep.	2,897	40.88%	7,087	1,293
1952	General	Nov. 4	Gerald Lorge (inc.)	Republican	9,661	66.20%	Joseph Promer	Dem.	4,932	33.80%	14,593	4,729

=== U.S. Senate (1957) ===
United States Senate Special Election in Wisconsin, 1957
Party	Candidate	Votes	%	±%
Republican Primary, July 30, 1957
Republican	Walter J. Kohler Jr.	109,256	34.43%	
Republican	Glenn R. Davis	100,532	31.68%	
Republican	Alvin E. O'Konski	66,784	21.05%	
Republican	Warren P. Knowles	23,996	7.56%	
Republican	Henry P. Hughes	7,488	2.36%	
Republican	Gerald Lorge	7,326	2.31%	
Republican	John C. Schafer	1,906	0.60%	
Plurality		8,724	2.75%	
Total votes		317,288	100.0%	

=== Wisconsin Attorney General (1974) ===
Wisconsin Attorney General Election, 1974
Party	Candidate	Votes	%	±%
General Election, November 5, 1974
Democratic	Bronson La Follette	669,968	58.10%	+12.01%
Republican	Gerald Lorge	483,232	41.90%	−11.41%
Plurality		186,736	16.19%	8.96%
Total votes		1,153,200	100.0%	-10.50%
Democratic gain from Republican		Swing	23.42%	

=== Wisconsin Senate (1954–1980) ===
Year	Election	Date	Elected				Defeated				Total	Plurality
1954	Primary	Sep. 14	Gerald Lorge	Republican	10,168	56.71%	William S. Pfankuch	Rep.	7,762	43.29%	17,930	2,406
1954	Special	Nov. 2	Gerald Lorge	Republican	26,093	100.0%	--unopposed--				26,093	26,093
1956	General	Nov. 6	Gerald Lorge (inc.)	Republican	35,915	75.18%	Gordon O. Rodenz	Dem.	11,858	24.82%	47,773	24,057
1960	Primary	Sep. 13	Gerald Lorge (inc.)	Republican	9,766	50.63%	Donald L. Jury	Rep.	5,895	30.56%	19,289	3,871
1960	Primary	Sep. 13	Gerald Lorge (inc.)	Republican	9,766	50.63%	Gerald K. Anderson	Rep.	3,628	18.81%	19,289	3,871
1960	General	Nov. 8	Gerald Lorge (inc.)	Republican	38,278	68.06%	Robert F. Stange	Dem.	17,963	31.94%	56,241	20,315
1964	Primary	Sep. 8	Gerald Lorge (inc.)	Republican	10,600	67.57%	George L. Buckley	Rep.	5,087	32.43%	15,687	5,513
1964	General	Nov. 3	Gerald Lorge (inc.)	Republican	35,208	65.99%	Richard K. Wege	Dem.	18,144	34.01%	53,352	17,064
1968	General	Nov. 5	Gerald Lorge (inc.)	Republican	42,313	100.0%	--unopposed--				42,313	42,313
1972	Primary	Sep. 12	Gerald Lorge (inc.)	Republican	13,890	74.32%	Gerald L. McFarren	Rep.	4,800	25.68%	18,690	9,090
1972	General	Nov. 7	Gerald Lorge (inc.)	Republican	35,919	72.88%	Michael P. Mack	Dem.	13,367	27.12%	49,286	22,552
1976	General	Nov. 2	Gerald Lorge (inc.)	Republican	36,937	67.47%	Robert E. Luedtke	Dem.	17,811	32.53%	54,748	19,126
1980	General	Nov. 4	Gerald Lorge (inc.)	Republican	34,289	55.43%	C. Michael Allen	Dem.	27,570	44.57%	61,859	6,719

=== Outagamie County Circuit Judge (1985) ===
Wisconsin Circuit Court, Outagamie Circuit, Branch 5 Election, 1985
Party	Candidate	Votes	%	±%
Nonpartisan Primary, February 19, 1985 (top-two)
Nonpartisan	Michael W. Gage	3,004	37.28%	
Nonpartisan	Kathleen Galles Lhost	2,305	28.61%	
Nonpartisan	Gerald Lorge	1,848	22.94%	
Nonpartisan	David G. Geenen	900	11.17%	
Total votes		8,057	100.0%	

Party political offices
Preceded by Robert W. Warren	Republican nominee for Attorney General of Wisconsin; 1974	Succeeded by William Mattka
Wisconsin State Assembly
Preceded by William M. Rohan	Member of the Wisconsin State Assembly from the Outagamie 2nd district January 1, 1951 – January 3, 1955	Succeeded by William T. Sullivan
Wisconsin Senate
Preceded by Gordon A. Bubolz	Member of the Wisconsin Senate from the 14th district January 3, 1955 – January 7, 1985	Succeeded by Joseph Leean
