= Francis R. Byers =

20th century American politician

Member of the Wisconsin State Assembly
- In office January 7, 1985 – January 2, 1989
- Preceded by: Earl Gilson
- Succeeded by: William Lorge
- Constituency: 40th Assembly district
- In office January 3, 1983 – January 7, 1985
- Preceded by: John H. Robinson
- Succeeded by: John H. Robinson
- Constituency: 85th Assembly district
- In office January 1, 1973 – January 3, 1983
- Preceded by: District established
- Succeeded by: Earl Gilson
- Constituency: 40th Assembly district
- In office January 6, 1969 – January 1, 1973
- Preceded by: Gerald K. Anderson
- Succeeded by: District abolished
- Constituency: Waupaca County district

Personal details
- Born: March 30, 1920 Marion, Wisconsin, U.S.
- Died: March 11, 1993 (aged 72) Marion, Wisconsin, U.S.
- Party: Republican
- Education: University of Wisconsin–Madison

Military service
- Allegiance: United States
- Branch/service: United States Navy
- Battles/wars: World War II
- Awards: Purple Heart

Francis R. Byers (March 30, 1920 – March 11, 1993) was an American businessman, journalist, and Republican politician from Waupaca County, Wisconsin. He served 10 terms in the Wisconsin State Assembly, representing the Waupaca area from 1969 through 1989.

== Biography ==
Byers was born on March 30, 1920, in Marion, Wisconsin. He graduated from the University of Wisconsin–Madison, and died on March 11, 1993, in Marion. During World War II, he served in the United States Navy. He was awarded the Purple Heart.

== Political career ==
Byers was a member of the Assembly from 1969 to 1989 sessions. He was a Republican. Byers was succeeded by William Lorge.

Wisconsin State Assembly
Preceded by Gerald K. Anderson	Member of the Wisconsin State Assembly from the Waupaca County district January 6, 1969 – January 1, 1973	District abolished
District created by 1971 Wis. Act 304	Member of the Wisconsin State Assembly from the 40th district January 1, 1973 – January 3, 1983	Succeeded by Earl Gilson
Preceded by John H. Robinson	Member of the Wisconsin State Assembly from the 85th district January 3, 1983 – January 7, 1985	Succeeded by John H. Robinson
Preceded by Earl Gilson	Member of the Wisconsin State Assembly from the 40th district January 7, 1985 – January 2, 1989	Succeeded by William Lorge
