= Bear Creek, Outagamie County, Wisconsin =

Bear Creek Welcome (1898–1915)
- Village
- Location of Bear Creek in Outagamie County, Wisconsin.
- Coordinates: 44°31′47″N 88°43′37″W
- Country: United States
- State: Wisconsin
- County: Outagamie

Area
  - Total: 0.92 sq mi (2.39 km^{2})
  - Land: 0.92 sq mi (2.39 km^{2})
  - Water: 0 sq mi (0.00 km^{2})

Population (2020)
  - Total: 427
  - Density: 463/sq mi (179/km^{2})
- Time zone: UTC-6 (Central (CST))
  - Summer (DST): UTC-5 (CDT)
- ZIP codes: 54922
- Area codes: Area codes 715 and 534
- FIPS code: 55-05575
- GNIS feature ID: 1582769
- Website: https://villageofbearcreek.net

Bear Creek is a village in Outagamie County, Wisconsin, United States. The population was 427 at the 2020 census.

== History ==
The community began as a lumber camp in 1850 when Captain Welcome Hyde, a lumberman, located on the bank of the Embarrass River and cut the first road into the area. The Milwaukee, Lake Shore, and Western Railroad (later Chicago and North Western Railway) was constructed through the area on its way to Clintonville, and began passenger and freight service through Bear Creek in 1878. Hyde built a store in what became Bear Creek Station. In 1885, land was platted for Hyde alongside the railroad right-of-way, and named Bear Creek after the nearby stream. In June 1898, the community and its post office were renamed Welcome, after Capt. Hyde.

In June 1902, work began to incorporate the community into a village. A disastrous fire struck the town on July 11, 1902, in which most of its business district was destroyed, owing in part to the fact that the community did not have a fire service of any kind. The day after this fire, an election was held on the question of incorporation, which passed, 65–15, and thus the Village of Welcome was established.

In the meantime, the cause of the fire was investigated and believed to be arson. In early 1903, Lucille Colbert was charged with setting fire to her own millinery and causing $80,000 in damage to the village. An unsigned letter, believed to be written in Colbert's handwriting, was mailed to the village's Catholic church, in which a man on his deathbed claimed responsibility for the fire, as retribution for a dispute with Colbert. A publicly followed multi-year trial and appeal process was set in motion. Colbert was convicted in on December 5, 1903, the day after "the largest crowd ever gathered in the Appleton courtroom" (300) heard closing arguments. Her conviction was appealed as she first remained under guard in a hotel. It was ultimately overturned in 1905 by the Wisconsin Supreme Court, headed by John B. Winslow, and a new trial was ordered. In 1907, a new trial having been on the court's calendar for each year thereafter, the case was officially dropped, with Colbert never having served a day behind bars.

The name of the village of Welcome was changed back to Bear Creek by consent of the Wisconsin Legislature on July 2, 1915, because of the confusion resulting from the village and the railroad station having different names.

The Chicago and North Western Railway abandoned their railway between New London and Clintonville in 1982. This was the track completed in 1878 which was largely responsible for Bear Creek's establishment. Once rails and ties were removed, the line right of way through Bear Creek was not repurposed.

== Geography ==
Bear Creek is located at 44°31′47″N 88°43′37″W (44.529649, -88.726849).

According to the United States Census Bureau, the village has a total area of 0.92 square miles (2.38 km^{2}), all land.

== Demographics ==
Historical population
Census	Pop.	Note	%±
1910	341		—
1920	337		−1.2%
1930	411		22.0%
1940	409		−0.5%
1950	476		16.4%
1960	455		−4.4%
1970	520		14.3%
1980	454		−12.7%
1990	418		−7.9%
2000	415		−0.7%
2010	448		8.0%
2020	427		−4.7%
U.S. Decennial Census

=== 2010 census ===
As of the census of 2010, there were 448 people, 155 households, and 114 families living in the village. The population density was 487.0 inhabitants per square mile (188.0/km^{2}). There were 174 housing units at an average density of 189.1 per square mile (73.0/km^{2}). The racial makeup of the village was 72.1% White, 0.2% African American, 0.2% Native American, 26.3% from other races, and 1.1% from two or more races. Hispanic or Latino of any race were 37.9% of the population.

There were 155 households, of which 37.4% had children under the age of 18 living with them, 55.5% were married couples living together, 9.0% had a female householder with no husband present, 9.0% had a male householder with no wife present, and 26.5% were non-families. 18.1% of all households were made up of individuals, and 7.8% had someone living alone who was 65 years of age or older. The average household size was 2.89 and the average family size was 3.29.

The median age in the village was 32.4 years. 27.7% of residents were under the age of 18; 11.8% were between the ages of 18 and 24; 28.4% were from 25 to 44; 21.9% were from 45 to 64; and 10.3% were 65 years of age or older. The gender makeup of the village was 53.8% male and 46.2% female.

=== 2000 census ===
As of the census of 2000, there were 415 people, 155 households, and 112 families living in the village. The population density was 448.8 people per square mile (174.2/km^{2}). There were 172 housing units at an average density of 186.0/sq mi (72.2/km^{2}). The racial makeup of the village was 92.29% White, 0.24% African American, 0.48% Native American, 5.06% from other races, and 1.93% from two or more races. Hispanic or Latino of any race were 10.84% of the population.

There were 155 households, out of which 31.6% had children under the age of 18 living with them, 51.0% were married couples living together, 14.2% had a female householder with no husband present, and 27.1% were non-families. 21.3% of all households were made up of individuals, and 6.5% had someone living alone who was 65 years of age or older. The average household size was 2.67 and the average family size was 3.08.

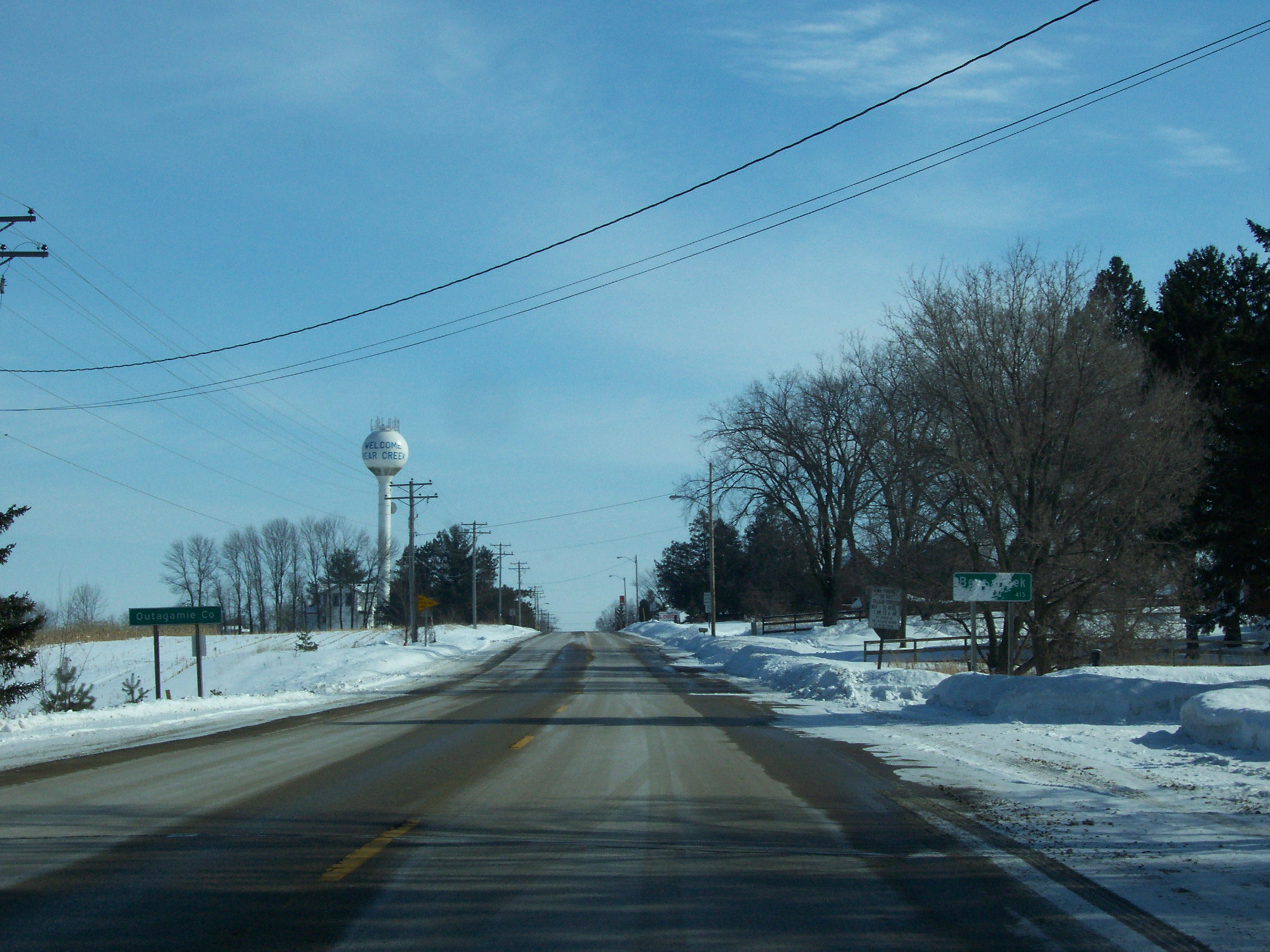
Sign and water tower

In the village, the population was spread out, with 28.2% under the age of 18, 10.8% from 18 to 24, 29.2% from 25 to 44, 22.7% from 45 to 64, and 9.2% who were 65 years of age or older. The median age was 33 years. For every 100 females, there were 101.5 males. For every 100 females age 18 and over, there were 105.5 males.

The median income for a household in the village was $39,375, and the median income for a family was $46,250. Males had a median income of $34,750 versus $19,653 for females. The per capita income for the village was $16,556. About 6.7% of families and 8.0% of the population were below the poverty line, including 7.0% of those under age 18 and 13.6% of those age 65 or over.

== Economy ==
Flanagan Brothers, a sauerkraut producer, was founded in Bear Creek in 1900 by brothers Dave and Henry Flanagan. Now named GLK Foods (having become Great Lakes Kraut Company in 1997 after several mergers), the business still operates a manufacturing facility in Bear Creek. GLK Foods describes itself as the "world's largest producer of sauerkraut".

== Notable people ==
- Gerald Lorge, Wisconsin politician
- William Lorge, Wisconsin politician
