= Wisconsin's 63rd Assembly district =

American legislative district in Racine County and Milwaukee County, Wisconsin

Wisconsin's 63rd State Assembly district
- 2024 map defined in 2023 Wisc. Act 94; 2022 map defined in Johnson v. Wisconsin Elections Commission; 2011 map was defined in 2011 Wisc. Act 43
Assemblymember
Robert Wittke; R–Wind Point
since January 6, 2025 (1 year, 52 days)
- Demographics: 82.31% White; 5.05% Black; 5.88% Hispanic; 4.82% Asian; 1.59% Native American; 0.09% Hawaiian/Pacific Islander
- Population (2020) • Voting age: 59,708; 47,783
- Website: Official website
- Notes: Southeast Wisconsin

The 63rd Assembly district of Wisconsin is one of 99 districts in the Wisconsin State Assembly. Located in southeast Wisconsin, the district comprises areas of northeast Racine County and southwest Milwaukee County. It includes most of the city of Franklin and most of the village of Caledonia. The district is represented by Republican Robert Wittke, since January 2025; Wittke previously represented the 62nd district from 2019 to 2025.

The 63rd Assembly district is located within Wisconsin's 21st Senate district, along with the 61st and 62nd Assembly districts.

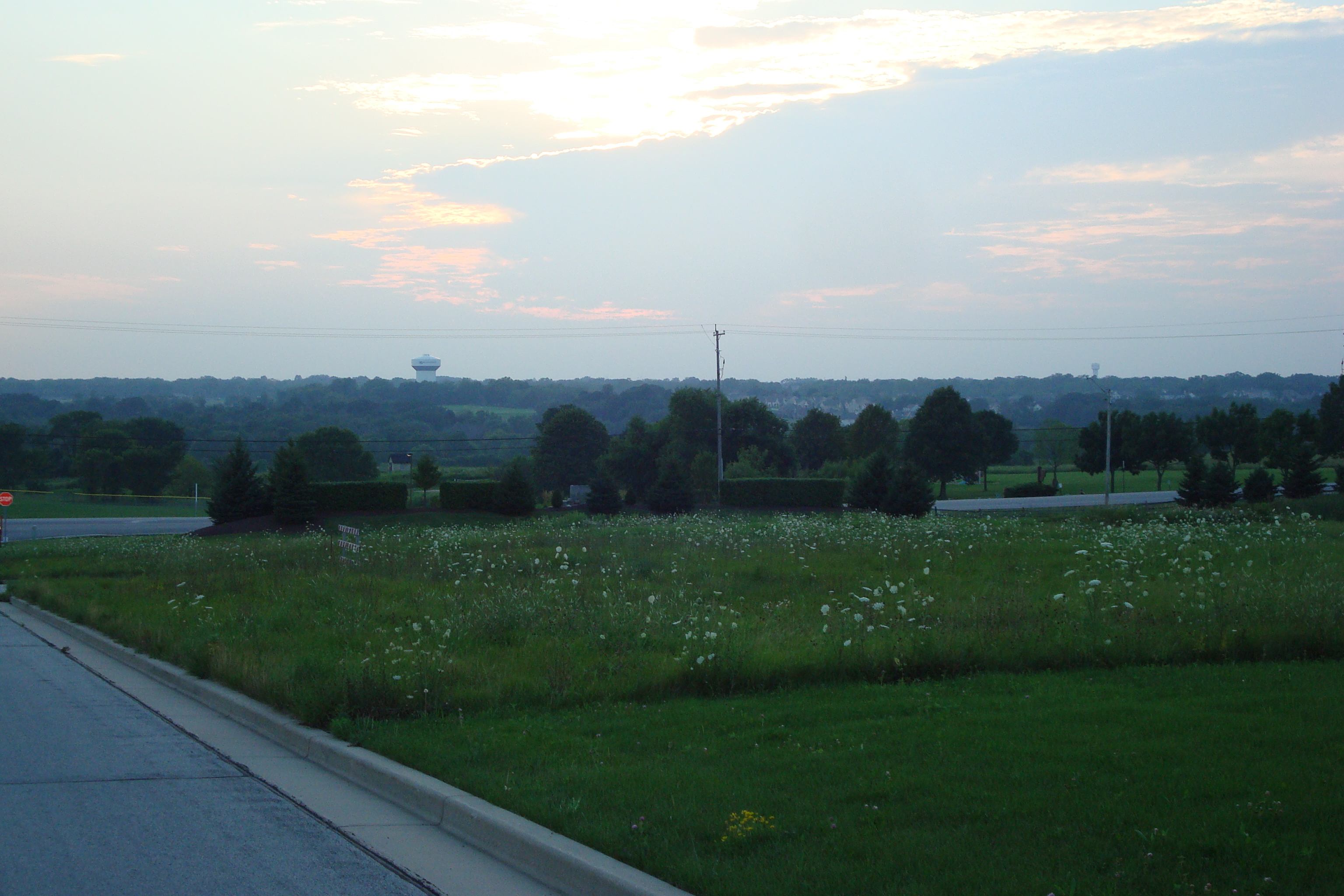
Root River valley in Franklin

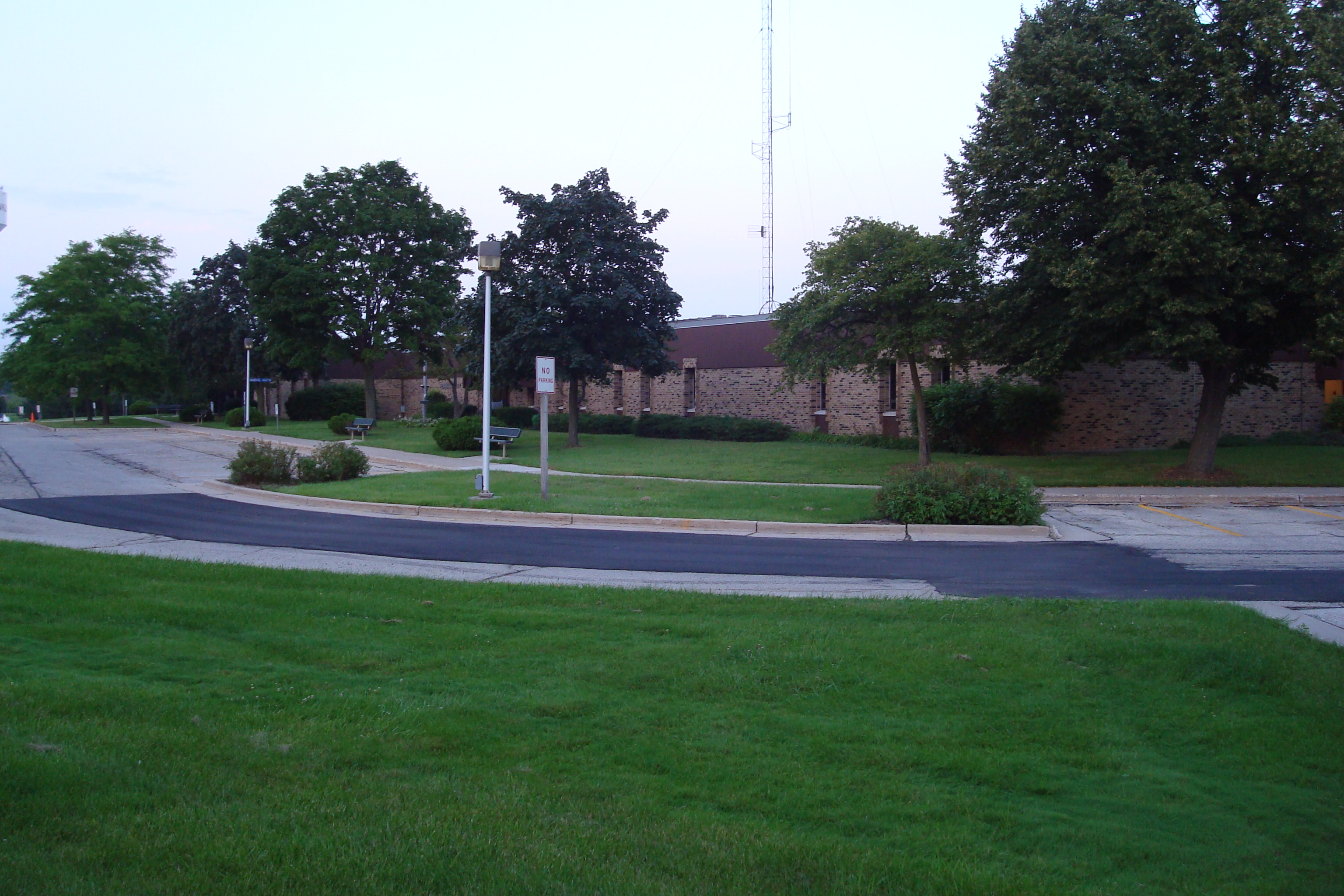
Franklin City Hall

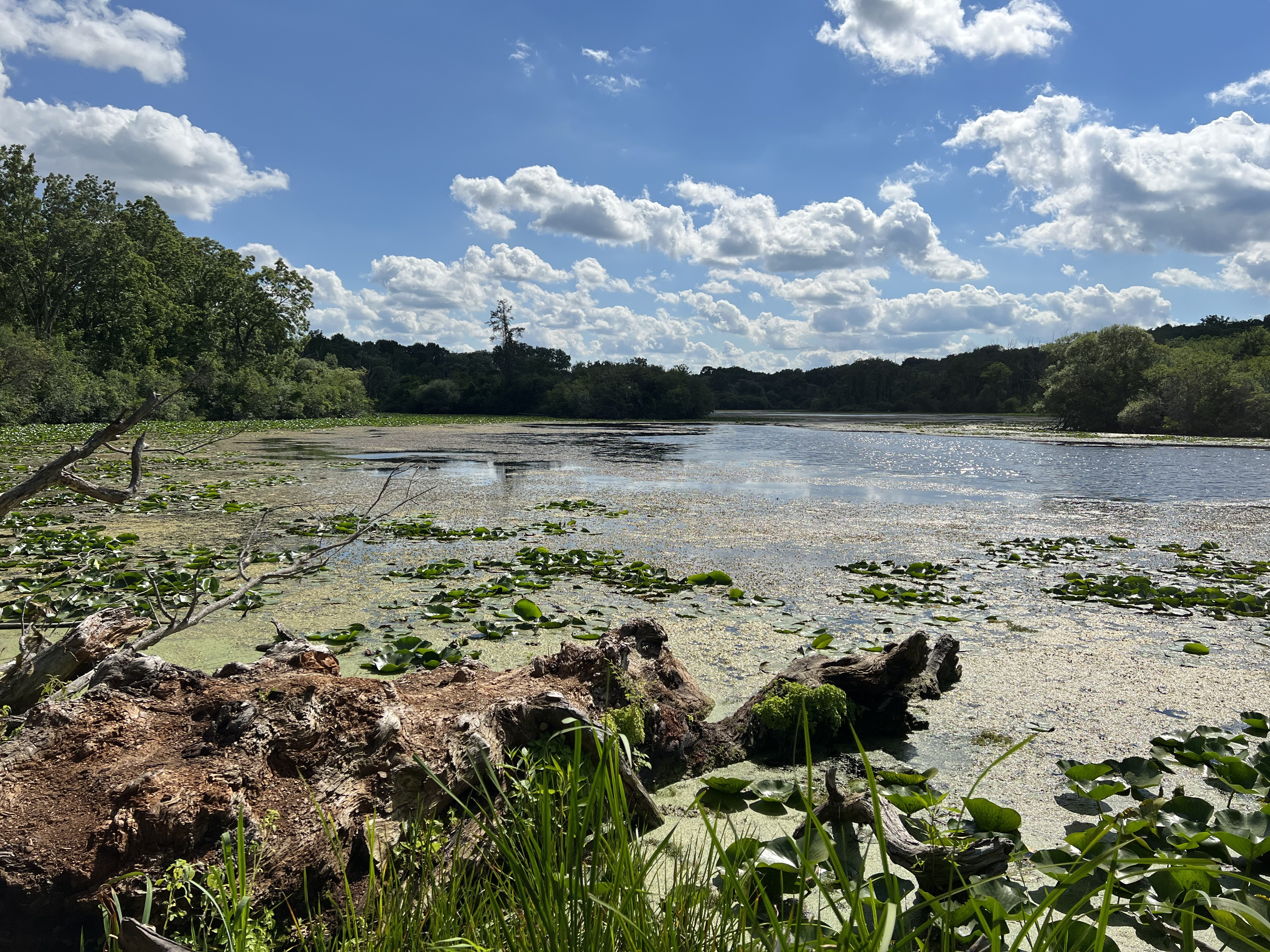
Whitnall Park

== List of past representatives ==
List of representatives to the Wisconsin State Assembly from the 63rd district
Member	Party	Residence	Counties represented	Term start	Term end	Ref.
District created
Henry Rohner	Rep.	Mount Pleasant	Racine	January 1, 1973	January 6, 1975	
Marcel Dandeneau	Dem.	Caledonia	Racine	January 6, 1975	January 3, 1979	
E. James Ladwig	Rep.	Caledonia	Racine	January 3, 1979	January 3, 1983	
John H. Robinson	Dem.	Wausau	Marathon	January 3, 1983	January 7, 1985	
E. James Ladwig	Rep.	Caledonia	Racine	January 7, 1985	January 4, 1993	
Bonnie Ladwig	Rep.	Caledonia	Racine	January 4, 1993	January 3, 2005	
Robin Vos	Rep.	Rochester	Racine	January 3, 2005	January 6, 2025	
Robert Wittke	Rep.	Wind Point	Milwaukee, Racine	January 6, 2025	Current	

== Electoral history ==
Year	Date	Elected				Defeated				Total	Plurality	Other primary candidates
1972	November 7	Henry Rohner	Republican	9,208	51.31%	John Siefert	Dem.	8,551	47.65%	17,946	657	George H. Iverson (Dem.)
1972	November 7	Henry Rohner	Republican	9,208	51.31%	Joseph Yugo	Amer.	187	1.04%	17,946	657	George H. Iverson (Dem.)
1974	November 5	Marcel Dandeneau	Democratic	6,613	57.58%	Henry Rohner (inc.)	Rep.	4,872	42.42%	11,485	1,741	John Siefert (Dem.)
1976	November 2	Marcel Dandeneau (inc.)	Democratic	12,657	62.14%	Herman V. Nelson	Rep.	7,711	37.86%	20,368	4,946	Robert N. Miller (Dem.); Daniel J. Nielsen (Dem.)
1978	November 7	E. James Ladwig	Republican	8,242	53.31%	Marcel Dandeneau (inc.)	Dem.	7,219	46.69%	15,461	1,023	
1980	November 4	E. James Ladwig (inc.)	Republican	13,386	57.83%	Marcel Dandeneau	Dem.	9,762	42.17%	23,148	3,624	Larry M. Mork (Dem.)
1982	November 2	John H. Robinson	Democratic	8,733	53.79%	John L. McEwen	Rep.	7,503	46.21%	16,236	1,230	
1984	November 6	E. James Ladwig	Republican	11,943	53.55%	Ronald A. Sell	Dem.	10,359	46.45%	22,302	1,584	
1986	November 4	E. James Ladwig (inc.)	Republican	9,218	62.25%	Marilyn S. Nemeth	Dem.	5,590	37.75%	14,808	3,628	William H. Kumm (Dem.)
1988	November 8	E. James Ladwig (inc.)	Republican	11,999	53.79%	Jeff Leavell	Dem.	10,309	46.21%	22,308	1,690	
1990	November 6	E. James Ladwig (inc.)	Republican	7,690	51.42%	Robert A. Beezat	Dem.	7,266	48.58%	14,956	424	
1992	November 3	Bonnie Ladwig	Republican	16,148	63.94%	Ronald Coutts	Dem.	9,105	36.06%	25,253	7,043	Shirley Mishleau (Rep.)
1994	November 8	Bonnie Ladwig (inc.)	Republican	14,724	100.0%					14,724	14,724	
1996	November 5	Bonnie Ladwig (inc.)	Republican	16,520	69.03%	Patrick F. Cherf	Dem.	6,672	27.88%	23,932	9,848	
1996	November 5	Bonnie Ladwig (inc.)	Republican	16,520	69.03%	Michael J. O'Hare	Tax.	740	3.09%	23,932	9,848	
1998	November 3	Bonnie Ladwig (inc.)	Republican	14,328	71.94%	Patrick F. Cherf	Dem.	5,588	28.06%	19,916	8,740	
2000	November 7	Bonnie Ladwig (inc.)	Republican	22,640	99.68%					22,712	22,568	Marla Ann Malacara (Rep.)
2002	November 5	Bonnie Ladwig (inc.)	Republican	15,068	99.18%					15,192	14,944	
2004	November 2	Robin Vos	Republican	23,682	99.37%					23,831	23,533	
2006	November 7	Robin Vos (inc.)	Republican	14,329	58.16%	Tim Daley	Dem.	10,304	41.82%	24,637	4,025	
2008	November 4	Robin Vos (inc.)	Republican	20,172	61.51%	Linda Flashinski	Dem.	12,609	38.45%	32,794	7,563	
2010	November 2	Robin Vos (inc.)	Republican	19,525	99.35%					19,653	19,397	
2012	November 6	Robin Vos (inc.)	Republican	17,704	58.31%	Kelley Albrecht	Dem.	12,637	41.62%	30,362	5,067	
2014	November 4	Robin Vos (inc.)	Republican	15,361	63.23%	Andy Mitchell	Dem.	8,917	36.70%	24,295	6,444	Bryn Biemeck (Rep.)
2016	November 8	Robin Vos (inc.)	Republican	18,771	64.16%	Andy Mitchell	Dem.	10,487	35.84%	29,258	8,284	
2018	November 6	Robin Vos (inc.)	Republican	16,775	61.00%	Joel Jacobsen	Dem.	10,705	38.93%	27,499	6,070	
2020	November 3	Robin Vos (inc.)	Republican	19,919	58.44%	Joel Jacobsen	Dem.	14,132	41.46%	34,087	5,787	
