= Bonnie Ladwig =

20th century American politician

Member of the Wisconsin State Assembly from the 63rd district
- In office January 4, 1993 – January 3, 2005
- Preceded by: E. James Ladwig
- Succeeded by: Robin Vos

Member of the Board of Supervisors of Racine County, Wisconsin
- In office 1984–1996

Personal details
- Born: Bonnie Lorraine Adams; December 11, 1939 Milwaukee, Wisconsin, U.S.
- Died: December 22, 2020 (aged 81) Lake Placid, Florida, U.S.
- Cause of death: COVID-19
- Party: Republican
- Spouse: E. James Ladwig (m. 1958–2020)
- Children: 3

Bonnie Lorraine Ladwig (née Adams; December 11, 1939 – December 22, 2020) was an American Republican politician from Racine County, Wisconsin. She was a member of the Wisconsin State Assembly for 12 years, representing Wisconsin's 63rd Assembly district from 1993 to 2005. Ladwig was one of several Wisconsin legislative leaders convicted of crimes for using state resources for political purposes in the wide-ranging 2002 "caucus scandal".

Her husband, E. James Ladwig, preceded her in the State Assembly. Their son, Jim, served as Racine County executive.

== Biography ==
Bonnie Ladwig was born Bonnie Lorraine Adams on December 11, 1939, in Milwaukee, Wisconsin. She was raised and educated in Milwaukee, graduating from Shorewood High School. Ladwig served in the Wisconsin State Assembly from 1993 until 2005.

In the fall of 2002, Ladwig and other bipartisan legislative leaders were ensnared in a scandal over use of state employees and state resources for political purposes, known in Wisconsin as the "caucus scandal". Ladwig was charged with one misdemeanor count for using Capitol staff to work on Republican campaigns. She pleaded guilty and was sentenced to 30 days in jail, which she served at home using electronic monitoring.

== Personal life and family ==
Bonnie Adams took the last name Ladwig when she married E. James Ladwig on December 19, 1958. They were married for 62 years and had three children together. Their son, Jim, also served as a member of the Racine County Board of Supervisors and was Racine County executive.

Bonnie Ladwig died from complications of COVID-19 on December 22, 2020, at the age of 81.

Wisconsin State Assembly
| Preceded by E. James Ladwig | Member of the Wisconsin State Assembly from the 63rd district January 4, 1993 – January 3, 2005 | Succeeded by Robin Vos |
