= William Lorge =

American politician (born 1960)

Bill Lorge

Member of the Wisconsin State Assembly from the 40th district
- In office January 2, 1989 – January 4, 1999
- Preceded by: Francis R. Byers
- Succeeded by: Jean Hundertmark

Personal details
- Born: August 31, 1960 (age 66) Bear Creek, Wisconsin, U.S.
- Party: Republican
- Spouse: Molly McGinty (m. 1996; div. 2014)
- Children: 4
- Parent: Gerald Lorge (father)
- Relatives: Anna Lorge Morgan (sister); Robert G. Lorge (brother)
- Education: University of Wisconsin–Madison
- Occupation: Businessman, politician, author

William D. "Bill" Lorge (born August 31, 1960) is an American Republican politician and former Elvis impersonator from Waupaca County, Wisconsin. He served ten years in the Wisconsin State Assembly, representing Wisconsin's 40th Assembly district from 1989 to 1999. He was also an unsuccessful candidate for the Republican nomination for U.S. senator and governor of Wisconsin in the 2000 and 2002 primaries.

His father, Gerald Lorge, served 30 years in the Wisconsin Senate, from 1955 to 1985.

== Early life ==
Born in Bear Creek, Wisconsin, Lorge graduated from Clintonville High School and then received his bachelor's degree from the University of Wisconsin–Madison. He also attended the Austro-American College in Vienna, Austria.

== Career ==
Lorge has been a real estate broker and a farmer. He served as a Congressional aide and a Wisconsin state senate legislative assistant for his father, Gerald Lorge. In 1984 he ran for the 14th District State Senate seat vacated by his father, losing in the primary to business owner Joseph Leean. Two years later he ran for Wisconsin state Treasurer, losing to Democrat Charles P. Smith He later ran served in the Wisconsin State Assembly as a Republican from 1989 until 1999. A 1996 survey of legislators conducted by Madison Magazine rated Lorge poorly in several categories. In 1998 Lorge lost to business owner Jean Hundertmark in the primary. That same year, Lorge submitted the highest expense report of any member of the Wisconsin State Assembly.

In 2002, Lorge entered the Republican gubernatorial primary, challenging incumbent Republican Governor Scott McCallum. He garnered only 8 percent of the vote, as McCallum was renominated. In 2004 Lorge ran for state senate. but failed to garner the required signatures to get on the ballot.

In 2026, Lorge ran in the Republican primary for state Assembly in the 57th Assembly district, but lost in the primary to Kevin Krentz.

== Personal life ==
William Lorge was a son of Gerald Lorge. Gerald Lorge served 30 years in the Wisconsin Senate, covering the entire period of William's childhood. Lorge married Molly McGinty on April 11, 1996, in Bear Creek. They had four children together before divorcing in 2014.

Lorge has worked as an Elvis Presley impersonator. He owned Badgerland MLS, a real estate company.

== Electoral history ==
=== Wisconsin Senate (1984) ===
Year	Election	Date	Elected				Defeated				Total	Plurality
1984	Primary	Sep. 11	Joseph Leean	Republican	6,948	38.35%	William D. Lorge	Rep.	6,741	37.21%	18,118	207
1984	Primary	Sep. 11	Joseph Leean	Republican	6,948	38.35%	Richard O. Wright	Rep.	4,000	22.07%	18,118	207
1984	Primary	Sep. 11	Joseph Leean	Republican	6,948	38.35%	Bernard Bult	Rep.	429	2.37%	18,118	207

=== Wisconsin Treasurer (1986) ===
Year	Election	Date	Elected				Defeated				Total	Plurality
1986	General	Nov. 4	Charles P. Smith	Democratic	725,009	52.67%	William D. Lorge	Rep.	601,432	43.69%	1,376,418	123,577
1986	General	Nov. 4	Charles P. Smith	Democratic	725,009	52.67%	Joan Hollingsworth	L&F	49,977	3.63%	1,376,418	123,577

=== Wisconsin Assembly, 40th district (1988–1998) ===
Year	Election	Date	Elected				Defeated				Total	Plurality
1988	Primary	Sep. 13	William D. Lorge	Republican	3,082	42.58%	David C. Harper	Rep.	1,681	23.22%	7,239	1,401
1988	Primary	Sep. 13	William D. Lorge	Republican	3,082	42.58%	Richard M. Lowe	Rep.	1,217	16.81%	7,239	1,401
1988	Primary	Sep. 13	William D. Lorge	Republican	3,082	42.58%	Katherine J. Hoffman	Rep.	945	13.05%	7,239	1,401
1988	Primary	Sep. 13	William D. Lorge	Republican	3,082	42.58%	Lyle Craig Bain	Rep.	314	4.34%	7,239	1,401
1988	General	Nov. 8	William D. Lorge	Republican	13,441	67.81%	Delayne I. Green	Dem.	6,380	32.19%	19,821	7,061
1990	General	Nov. 6	William D. Lorge	Republican	9,213	100.0%	--unopposed--				9,213	N/A
1992	Primary	Sep. 8	William D. Lorge (inc)	Republican	3,991	50.15%	Kenneth Van Dyke Sr.	Rep.	3,968	49.85%	7,959	23
1992	General	Nov. 3	William D. Lorge (inc)	Republican	13,684	58.36%	Andrew Gussert	Dem.	7,395	41.64%	23,446	3,922
1994	Primary	Sep. 13	William D. Lorge (inc)	Republican	4,356	58.90%	James W. Boyer	Rep.	3,039	41.10%	7,395	1,317
1994	General	Nov. 8	William D. Lorge (inc)	Republican	10,146	100.0%	--unopposed--				10,146	N/A
1996	Primary	Sep. 10	William D. Lorge (inc)	Republican	3,477	48.73%	Jean Hundertmark	Rep.	1,944	27.25%	7,135	1,533
1996	Primary	Sep. 10	William D. Lorge (inc)	Republican	3,477	48.73%	William E. Mork	Rep.	1,714	24.02%	7,135	1,533
1996	General	Nov. 8	William D. Lorge (inc)	Republican	13,395	70.89%	Cornelius D. Van Handel	Dem.	5,500	29.11%	18,895	7,895
1998	Primary	Sep. 8	Jean Hundertmark	Republican	5,614	53.56%	William D. Lorge (inc)	Rep.	4,868	46.44%	10,482	746

=== Wisconsin Senate (1995) ===
Year	Election	Date	Elected				Defeated				Total	Plurality
1995 (special)	Primary	Aug. 15	Robert T. Welch	Republican	3,991	50.15%	William D. Lorge	Rep.	3,968	49.85%	7,959	23

=== U.S. Senate (2000) ===
Year	Election	Date	Elected				Defeated				Total	Plurality
2000	Primary	Sep. 12	John Gillespie	Republican	135,364	68.04%	Bill Lorge	Rep.	41,026	20.62%	198,939	94,338
2000	Primary	Sep. 12	John Gillespie	Republican	135,364	68.04%	Mark Gumz	Rep.	21,698	10.91%	198,939	94,338

=== Wisconsin Assembly, 42nd district (2001) ===
Year	Election	Date	Elected				Defeated				Total	Plurality
2001 (special)	Primary	Oct. 9	J.A. Hines	Republican	1,104	28.66%	Bob Van Abel	Rep.	890	23.11%	3,852	214
2001 (special)	Primary	Oct. 9	J.A. Hines	Republican	1,104	28.66%	Lance Burri	Rep.	873	22.67%	3,852	214
2001 (special)	Primary	Oct. 9	J.A. Hines	Republican	1,104	28.66%	Dave Ament	Rep.	556	14.43%	3,852	214
2001 (special)	Primary	Oct. 9	J.A. Hines	Republican	1,104	28.66%	Bill Lorge	Rep.	324	8.41%	3,852	214
2001 (special)	Primary	Oct. 9	J.A. Hines	Republican	1,104	28.66%	Frank Cook	Rep.	101	2.62%	3,852	214

=== Wisconsin governor (2002) ===
Year	Election	Date	Elected				Defeated				Total	Plurality
2002	Primary	Sep. 10	Scott McCallum (inc)	Republican	198,525	86.23%	Bill Lorge	Rep.	18,852	27.25%	230,232	179,673
2002	Primary	Sep. 10	Scott McCallum (inc)	Republican	198,525	86.23%	George Pobuda	Rep.	1,714	24.02%	230,232	179,673

=== Wisconsin Assembly, 57th district (2026) ===
Year	Election	Date	Elected				Defeated				Total	Plurality
2026	Primary	Aug. 11	Kevin Krentz	Republican	5,120	55.72%	Dylan Testin	Rep.	2,396	26.08%	9,188	2,724
2026	Primary	Aug. 11	Kevin Krentz	Republican	5,120	55.72%	Bill Lorge	Rep.	870	9.47%	9,188	2,724
2026	Primary	Aug. 11	Kevin Krentz	Republican	5,120	55.72%	Ed Delgado	Rep.	799	8.70%	9,188	2,724

Party political offices
Preceded by Harold W. Clemens	Republican nominee for State Treasurer of Wisconsin; 1986	Succeeded by Cathy Zeuske
Wisconsin State Assembly
Preceded by Francis R. Byers	Member of the Wisconsin State Assembly from the 40th district January 2, 1989 – January 4, 1999	Succeeded by Jean Hundertmark
