= Gregory Huber =

Retired American politician and judge (born 1956)

The Honorable Greg Huber

Chief Judge of the 9th District of Wisconsin Circuit Courts
- In office August 1, 2016 – July 31, 2022
- Preceded by: Neal A. Nielsen
- Succeeded by: Ann Knox-Bauer

Wisconsin Circuit Court Judge for the Marathon Circuit, Branch 2
- In office June 1, 2004 – July 31, 2022
- Appointed by: Jim Doyle
- Preceded by: Raymond F. Thums
- Succeeded by: Rick Cveykus

Member of the Wisconsin State Assembly from the 85th district
- In office January 3, 1989 – May 31, 2004
- Preceded by: John H. Robinson
- Succeeded by: Donna J. Seidel

Personal details
- Born: January 25, 1956 (age 70) Wausau, Wisconsin, U.S.
- Party: Democratic
- Spouse: none
- Education: University of Wisconsin–Madison (B.A., J.D.)

Gregory B. Huber (born January 25, 1956) is a retired American lawyer, politician, and judge. He served 18 years as a Wisconsin circuit court judge in Marathon County and was chief judge of the 9th District of Wisconsin Circuit Courts from 2016 through 2022. Previously, he represented northern Marathon County as a Democratic member of the Wisconsin State Assembly.

== Biography ==
Born in Wausau, Wisconsin, Huber graduated from Watertown High School, in Watertown, Wisconsin. He received his bachelors and law degrees from the University of Wisconsin–Madison in 1978 and 1981, respectively. In his early legal career, Huber worked as an assistant district attorney in Marathon County, and a law clerk for the Wisconsin Circuit Court in Outagamie County.

In 1988, after incumbent state representative John H. Robinson resigned his seat to take office as Mayor of Wausau, Huber announced his candidacy to replace him. Huber narrowly won a three-way race in the Democratic primary, finishing 168 votes ahead of county planner Larry Saeger. He went on to another close victory in the November general election, which, after a recount, produced a final margin of 203 votes for Huber over Republican David M. Torkko.

After his narrow 1988 victory, Huber was re-elected seven times, serving until 2004. He served for several sessions on the influential Joint Finance Committee and the Joint Legislative Council. During the Democratic majorities in the 1991 and 1993 sessions, he was chairman of the committees of Reapportionment (1991), Tax Delinquent Contaminated Land (1991), and Elections, Constitutional Law and Corrections (1993).

Huber's path to the Circuit Court judgeship started with the July 2003 announcement by incumbent judge Raymond F. Thums that he would retire by the end of the year. A special election was scheduled for April 2004 with a primary in February. Huber topped the primary with nearly 50% of the vote, and went on to win election over lawyer and counselor Coleen Kennedy. After his election, he was appointed to begin his term early, in June 2004, since the seat was already vacant. He was re-elected in 2010 and 2016 without opposition.

In 2016, the Wisconsin Supreme Court appointed him to be Chief Judge of the 9th District of Wisconsin Circuit Courts, replacing Judge Neal Nielsen of Vilas County. He was subsequently re-appointed in 2018 and 2020. He was not eligible for another term as Chief Judge and retired at the end of his term in 2022.

== Electoral history ==
=== Wisconsin Assembly (1988–2002) ===
Wisconsin Assembly, 85th District Election, 1988
Party	Candidate	Votes	%	±%
Democratic Primary, September 13, 1988
Democratic	Gregory B. Huber	2,468	42.41%	
Democratic	Larry Saeger	2,300	39.52%	
Democratic	Francis X. Vogel	1,052	18.08%	
Plurality		168	2.89%	
Total votes		5,820	100.0%	
General Election, November 8, 1988
Democratic	Gregory B. Huber	10,595	50.48%	−12.90%
Republican	David M. Torkko	10,392	49.52%	
Plurality		203	0.97%	-25.80%
Total votes		20,987	100.0%	+22.40%
Democratic hold				

=== Wisconsin Circuit Court (2004–present) ===
Wisconsin Circuit Court, Marathon Circuit, Branch 2 Election, 2004
Party	Candidate	Votes	%	±%
Nonpartisan Primary, February 17, 2004
Nonpartisan	Gregory B. Huber	10,008	49.51%	
Nonpartisan	Coleen Kennedy	6,825	33.77%	
Nonpartisan	Philip J. Freeburg	3,367	16.66%	
	Scattering	13	0.06%	
Total votes		20,213	100.0%	
General Election, April 6, 2004
Nonpartisan	Gregory B. Huber	10,791	54.68%	
Nonpartisan	Coleen Kennedy	8,941	45.31%	
	Scattering	3	0.02%	
Plurality		1,850	9.38%	
Total votes		19,735	100.0%	+66.33%

Wisconsin State Assembly
Preceded by John H. Robinson	Member of the Wisconsin State Assembly from the 85th district January 3, 1989 – May 31, 2004	Succeeded by Donna J. Seidel
Legal offices
Preceded by Raymond F. Thums	Wisconsin Circuit Court Judge for the Marathon Circuit, Branch 2 June 1, 2004 – July 31, 2022	Succeeded by Rick Cveykus
Preceded by Neal Nielsen	Chief Judge of the 9th District of Wisconsin Circuit Courts; August 1, 2016 – July 31, 2022	Succeeded by Ann Knox-Bauer
