= Dave Heaton (Wisconsin politician) =

21st century American politician

Member of the Wisconsin State Assembly from the 85th district
- In office January 5, 2015 – January 3, 2017
- Preceded by: Mandy Wright
- Succeeded by: Patrick Snyder

Personal details
- Born: October 19, 1971 (age 54) Chicago, Illinois, U.S.
- Party: Republican
- Spouse: married
- Children: 3
- Education: Northern Illinois University (BA); DePaul University (JD)
- Profession: Reinsurance consultant, attorney, former prosecutor

Dave Heaton (born October 19, 1971) is an American businessman, lawyer, and Republican politician from Wausau, Wisconsin. He was a member of the Wisconsin State Assembly for one term, representing the 85th Assembly district during the 102nd Wisconsin Legislature.

== Background ==
Dave Heaton grew up in a family of 15 siblings. After high school, he joined the Air National Guard where he served from 1990 to 1996 while simultaneously working his way through college. In 1998, Heaton earned his Juris Doctor degree from DePaul University law school and worked as a prosecutor in Cook County, Illinois. Heaton's career then moved into the private sector as he transitioned from the practice of law into business roles. He currently works as a reinsurance consultant for a company in Wausau.

== Elective office ==
On April 24, 2014, Heaton announced his candidacy for Wisconsin's 85th Assembly District. Heaton was unopposed in the August Republican primary and on November 4, 2014, Heaton defeated incumbent Mandy Wright by 85 votes out of the over 22,000 cast. After the completion of the final canvass of votes his opponent conceded the tight race. Heaton is the first Republican to represent Wausau in the Assembly in over 50 years.

=== 2015–2017 Legislature ===
On January 5, 2015, Representative Heaton was sworn into the Wisconsin State Assembly as member of a 63 member Republican majority the largest in more than 50 years. For the 2015–2017 Session he serves on the Assembly Committees on Consumer Protection, where he serves as Vice Chairman, Children and Families, Judiciary, and Veterans and Military Affairs. Heaton was also appointed to serve as a member of the Speaker's Task Force on Urban Education.

On November 17, 2015, the national advocacy organization, Mothers Against Drunk Driving (MADD) recognized Representative Heaton as one of their 2015 Legislators of the Year in Wisconsin. Heaton was recognized for his work on Assembly Bill 266 and Senate Bill 222 that would strengthen the state's ignition interlock law.

== Personal life ==
Heaton lives in Wausau, Wisconsin with his wife and their three children.

== Electoral history ==
2014 Election for Wisconsin's 85th Assembly District
Party	Candidate	Votes	%	±%
Republican	Dave Heaton	11,167	50.19%	+3.68 %
Democratic	Mandy Wright	11,082	49.81%	+0.06 %
Republican gain from Democratic				
