= Mandy Wright =

American educator and politician

Member of the Wisconsin State Assembly from the 85th district
- In office January 7, 2013 – January 5, 2015
- Preceded by: Donna J. Seidel
- Succeeded by: Dave Heaton

Personal details
- Born: June 7, 1977 (age 49) Wausau, Wisconsin
- Party: Democratic
- Education: St. Olaf College, Viterbo University
- Profession: Politician and educator

Mandy Wright (born June 7, 1977) is an American educator and politician.

From Wausau, Wisconsin, Wright graduated from St. Olaf College and earned her master's degree in education from Viterbo University. Wright was a 6th grade teacher in Wausau, at Horace Mann Middle School. In November 2012, Wright was elected to the Wisconsin State Assembly as a Democrat. On November 4, 2014, Wright was defeated by Republican challenger David Heaton, losing by 84 votes out of over 20,000 cast She ran again in 2016 and lost to Patrick Snyder, her Republican opponent from the first election. Wright currently (2018) has three children; Ruby, Sylvia, and Lucy. In 2017 Wright began working at Marathon Venture Academy, a public charter school.

== Electoral history ==
=== Wisconsin Assembly (2012–2016) ===
Year	Election	Date	Elected				Defeated				Total	Plurality
2012	Primary	Aug. 14	Mandy Wright	Democratic	1,626	60.74%	Jeff Johnson	Dem.	1,050	39.22%	2,677	576
2012	General	Nov. 6	Mandy Wright	Democratic	13,930	49.70%	Patrick Snyder	Rep.	13,025	46.47%	28,026	905
2012	General	Nov. 6	Mandy Wright	Democratic	13,930	49.70%	Jim Maas	Ind.	1,047	3.74%	28,026	905
2014	General	Nov. 4	Dave Heaton	Republican	11,167	50.19%	Mandy Wright	Dem.	11,082	49.81%	22,249	85
2016	General	Nov. 8	Patrick Snyder	Republican	14,722	53.35%	Mandy Wright	Dem.	12,837	46.52%	27,594	1,885
