= William J. Gantter =

American politician

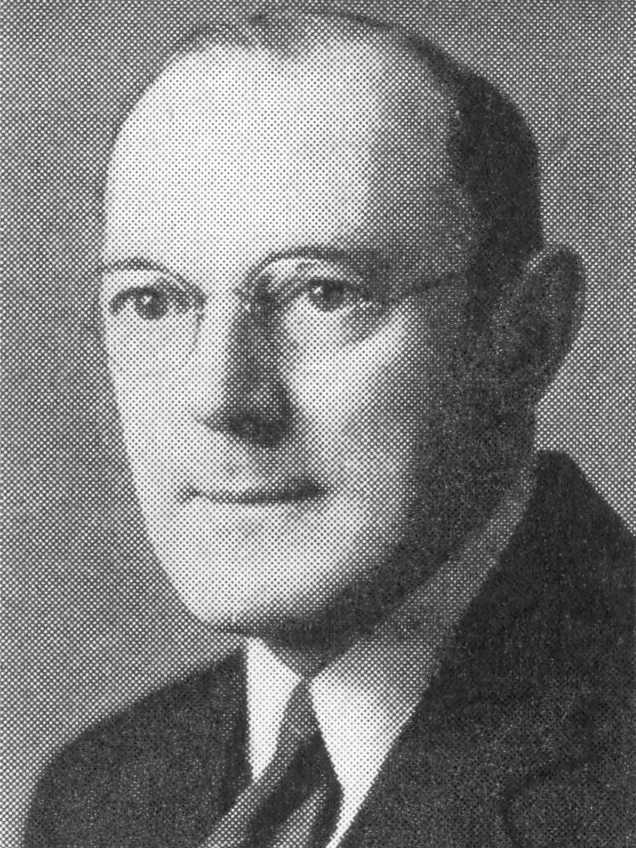
Gantter circa 1940

William J. Gantter (June 15, 1885 – February 25, 1942) was a member of the Wisconsin State Assembly.

== Biography ==
Gantter was born on June 15, 1885, in Kaukauna, Wisconsin. During World War I, he served in the United States Army. In 1937, Gantter was Police Commissioner and Fire Commissioner of Kaukauna.

== Political career ==
Gantter was a member of the Assembly from 1939 to 1940. He was a Republican. Afterward, he became the mayor of Kaukana. His term as mayor was cut short by his death, on February 25, 1942.
