= E. James Ladwig =

20th century American politician

Jim Ladwig

Member of the Wisconsin State Assembly from the 63rd district
- In office January 7, 1985 – January 4, 1993
- Preceded by: John H. Robinson
- Succeeded by: Bonnie Ladwig
- In office January 3, 1979 – January 3, 1983
- Preceded by: Marcel Dandeneau
- Succeeded by: John H. Robinson

Member of the Board of Supervisors of Racine County, Wisconsin
- In office 1974–1978

Personal details
- Born: April 13, 1938 Milwaukee, Wisconsin, U.S.
- Died: March 28, 2023 (aged 84) Lake Placid, Florida, U.S.
- Party: Republican
- Spouse: Bonnie Ladwig (m. 1958; died 2020)
- Children: 3
- Education: University of Wisconsin–Madison

Military service
- Allegiance: United States
- Branch/service: United States Army
- Years of service: 1962–1964
- Rank: 1st Lieutenant

Eldor James "Jim" Ladwig (April 13, 1938 – March 28, 2023) was an American businessman and Republican politician from Racine County, Wisconsin. He was a member of the Wisconsin State Assembly for twelve years, representing Wisconsin's 63rd Assembly district from 1979 to 1983, and from 1985 to 1993. Earlier, he served on the Racine County Board of Supervisors.

His wife, Bonnie Ladwig, succeeded him in the State Assembly. Their son, Jim, served as Racine County executive.

== Early life and career ==
Ladwig was born on April 13, 1938, in Milwaukee, Wisconsin. He graduated from Riverside University High School and the University of Wisconsin–Madison. Ladwig served in the United States Army, worked as a high school teacher, and later became an investment broker.

== Political career ==
Ladwig was first elected to the Assembly in 1978, defeating incumbent Democrat Marcel Dandeneau. Additionally, he was Supervisor of the Town of Caledonia, Wisconsin, from 1971 to 1973, and a member of the Racine County Board of Supervisors from 1974 to 1978.

== Personal life and family ==
On December 19, 1958, James Ladwig married Bonnie L. Adams. They were married for 62 years and had three children. Bonnie succeeded him in the State Assembly after he left office in 1993. Bonnie died in 2020; James Ladwig died March 28, 2023, in Lake Placid, Florida.

Their son Jim was Racine County executive from 2011 to 2014.

Wisconsin State Assembly
Preceded by Marcel Dandeneau	Member of the Wisconsin State Assembly from the 63rd district January 3, 1979 – January 3, 1983	Succeeded by John H. Robinson
Preceded by John H. Robinson	Member of the Wisconsin State Assembly from the 63rd district January 7, 1985 – January 4, 1993	Succeeded by Bonnie Ladwig
