= Donna J. Seidel =

American politician from Wisconsin

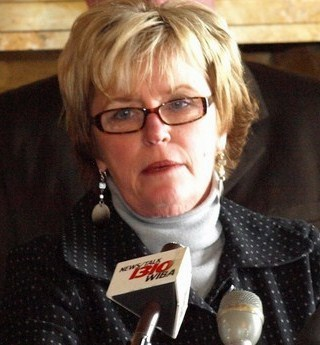
- Seidel in 2010

Member of the Wisconsin State Assembly from the 85th district
- In office January 3, 2005 – January 7, 2013
- Preceded by: Gregory Huber
- Succeeded by: Mandy Wright

Personal details
- Born: August 6, 1950 (age 76) Neenah, Wisconsin, U.S.
- Party: Democratic
- Education: University of Wisconsin, Stevens Point
- Occupation: Law enforcement Former county clerk

Donna J. Seidel (born August 6, 1950) is an American former politician, police officer and investigator from Neenah, Wisconsin who served as a Democratic Party member of the Wisconsin State Assembly, representing the 85th Assembly District (Wausau and other parts of Marathon County and two tiny portions of Shawano County) from her election in 2004 until 2013.

== Background ==
Seidel was born in Neenah on August 6, 1950. She graduated from Neenah High School, and received a Bachelor of Science degree from the University of Wisconsin-Stevens Point in 1972. She worked as a police officer, and as an investigator for a district attorney’s office.

== Public office ==
She was the elected Marathon County Clerk of Circuit Court from 1989-2004. She ran for the Assembly in 2004, was unopposed in the Democratic primary, and won the general election with 15,666 votes (57.29%) to 11,667 (42.67%) for Republican Sarah Kamke. She was assigned to the standing committees on children and families; on corrections and the courts; on tourism; and on workforce development. She was re-elected in 2006 with 64.55% of the vote and in 2007 became secretary of the Minority Caucus of the Assembly. Re-elected in 2008 with 64.08%, she was elected Assistant Majority Leader of the Assembly Democrats. She was re-elected in 2010 with 52.53% of the vote to 43.15% for Republican Charles Eno and 4.23 percent for Libertarian Jim Maas; and remained Assistant Leader of the Assembly Democrats until she retired in 2012.

Seidel was a candidate in the 2012 Senate recall election for the 29th District Wisconsin State Senate seat formerly held by Republican Pam Galloway (who had already resigned). On June 5, 2012 Jerry Petrowski defeated Seidel in the special election.

== Personal life ==
Seidel is married. She has one daughter and two step-children.
