= Badger Green Bay Business College =

Former business school in Wisconsin

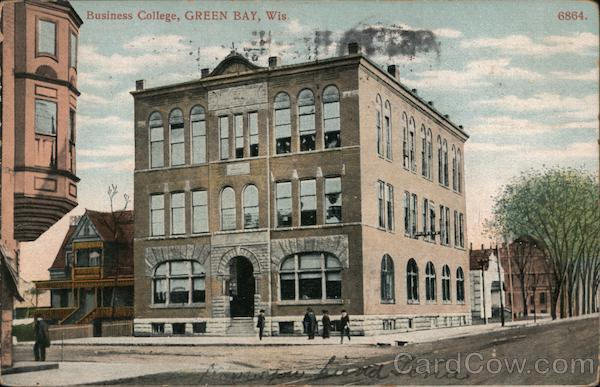
Green Bay Business College postcard, 1908

The Badger Green Bay Business College (sometimes Badger-Green Bay Business College) was a private business school in Green Bay, Wisconsin, United States, which was forced to shut down by the Wisconsin Educational Approval Board at the end of 1973 after 105 years of operation, due to "inadequate facilities [and] obsolete equipment and curricula". By this time, enrollment was down to 16 students, which the school blamed on news stories in the Green Bay Press-Gazette.

== Past history ==
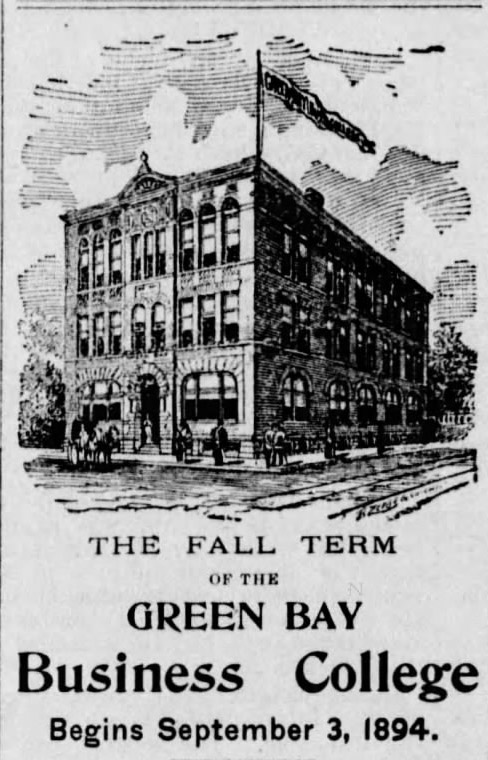
Green Bay Business College 1894 Fall Term advertisement

=== Green Bay Business College ===
Green Bay Business College (GBBS) was established in 1868 by a man named Devlin, was soon purchased by a Rev. Blackmun, and in 1880 was taken over by two men named Murch and Hills. John Niven McCunn, a native of Scotland and later U.S. consul in Dunfermline, purchased Hill's share in 1886, and in 1887 bought out Murch as well, as well as bringing in E. F. Quintal as an instructor. He owned the school, which was sometimes called McCunn's Business College after its principal, until 1900. In 1893, he built what was at the time the largest structure in Wisconsin dedicated to a business college.

C. B. Potter and E. F. Quintal, who had been teachers at one of the Brown's Business College schools, bought GBBS in 1901 and as of 1920, it was still under E. F. and Kenneth E. Quintal. In 1924, Mr. and Mrs. S. P. Randall already owned the Green Bay Business College (although Quintal was listed in various directories as Dean). By 1925, after the Randalls had purchased Badger, advertisements for GBBC began to list only Quintal as "Principal and Manager" and cautioned, "There are schools — and schools. Be careful in your selection." In April 1926, C. A. Cowee of Wausau bought half of GBBC; and new ads emphasized the longevity of the school and used the tagline "The Old Reliable School". By August 1928, Cowee is listed in ads as "President", and the new tagline is "We are an accredited School". In 1930, the school started to advertise "Affiliated with Moser College, Chicago: Paul Moser, J. D., Ph. B., Pres."

In January 1931, ads were for "MOSER Green Bay Business College" as "The Business College With The University Atmosphere", with Moser as Owner and one J. L. Tibbetts as Principal and General Manager. By June, the Press-Gazette flatly announced that the school, which "has changed hands several times" in recent years) had closed ("it is assumed that lack of business was responsible for the closing") and its furniture had already been sold.

=== Badger Commercial College ===
In 1913 the Badger Commercial College and Telegraph School had been established, and in the 1920s was reported to be under the proprietorship of Walter E. Twyford.

In 1924, Mr. and Mrs. S. P. Randall, already owning the Green Bay Business College, announced that they had assumed control of the Badger Business College [sic] as well. In July 1924, it was announced that Twyford was still part-proprietor of the school, and in August, while advertisements said "under entirely new management", Twyford was still listed as Principal (S. P. Randall was described as "Manager"), and ads used the name "Badger Commercial College", not "Business College", as they would continue to do so for many years.

Rival GBCC shut down in June 1931; by June 10, Badger was boasting "we are now the only business college in Green Bay", and in August ran ads inviting recent GBCC graduates to register with Badger's employment bureau to find work.

On January 9, 1934, with the expiration of the old Green Bay corporation's charter, Randall changed the school's name to Badger Green Bay Business College (sometimes hyphenated), citing the familiarity attached to the old Green Bay Business College and the many local notables who had attended it. Quintal remained at Badger-Green Bay as an instructor in penmanship, and in October 1936 was one of four people from BGBBC to attend a business college conference in Wausau; but in 1939, he was announced as dean of the new Wood Business College which was to open in September.

=== Later history ===
The Randall family were still in control of the school at the time of its 1974 closure.
