= Edward F. McClain =

American politician

Edward F. McClain is a former member of the Wisconsin State Assembly.

== Biography ==
McClain was born on August 12, 1935, in Martinsburg, West Virginia. After graduating from high school in Parsons, West Virginia, McClain served in the United States Army and attended West Virginia University and Southern Illinois University Carbondale. He later joined the faculty of the University of Wisconsin-Marathon County.

== Political career ==
McClain was a candidate for the Wisconsin State Senate from the 29th district in 1970. He lost to incumbent Walter Chilsen. McClain was elected to the Assembly in 1974, 1976 and 1978. He is a Democrat.
