= Earl Gilson =

American politician

Earl Gilson (July 1, 1923 – September 4, 2004) was a member of the Wisconsin State Assembly.

== Biography ==
Gilson was born on July 1, 1923, in De Pere, Wisconsin. He graduated from high school in Fond du Lac, Wisconsin before attending Colorado State University. During World War II, Gilson served in the United States Army Air Forces. He later transferred to the United States Air Force and would altogether serve twenty years in the military. Gilson was married with two children and was a member of The Nature Conservancy and the local chapter of the Humane Society of the United States. He was a professor at Colorado State University and later at University of Wisconsin–River Falls. He died on September 4, 2004, in Port Angeles, Washington from myelofibrosis.

== Political career ==
Gilson was elected to the Assembly in 1982. He was a Democrat.
