= Gordon A. Bubolz =

American politician (1905–1990)

Gordon A. Bubolz (September 10, 1905 – October 12, 1990) was an American politician and member of the Wisconsin State Senate.

== Biography ==
Born in Seymour, Wisconsin, Bubolz had German ancestry. He graduated from Lawrence University, the Wharton School of the University of Pennsylvania and received his law degree from University of Wisconsin Law School. He also went to the George Washington University Law School and taught accounting at Lawrence University. Bubolz practiced law in Appleton, Wisconsin. He was born Gordon August Bubolz on September 10, 1905 in Outagamie County, Wisconsin. Bubolz died of pneumonia in Appleton, Wisconsin on October 12, 1990.

Bubolz was a Lutheran by religion. His brother George was a Lutheran pastor and a candidate for the Michigan House of Representatives in 1964. His great-grandson Ron Tusler serves in the Wisconsin Legislature.

== Career ==
Bubolz was a member of the Senate from 1945 to 1953. He was a Republican.
