= Ellen Schutt =

21st century American politician

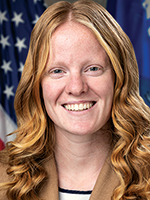
- Official portrait, 2023

Member-elect of the Wisconsin Senate from the 11th district
- Assuming office January 2027
- Succeeding: Stephen Nass

Member of the Wisconsin State Assembly from the 31st district
- In office January 3, 2023 – January 6, 2025
- Preceded by: Amy Loudenbeck
- Succeeded by: Tyler August

Personal details
- Born: October 16, 1995 (age 31) Darien, Wisconsin, U.S.
- Party: Republican
- Spouse: Eric Barbour (m. 2021)
- Children: 1
- Education: University of Wisconsin–Madison (BA)
- Website: Campaign website

Ellen Lynn Schutt (born October 16, 1995) is an American Republican politician from Walworth County, Wisconsin. She is a member-elect of the Wisconsin Senate, and will represent Wisconsin's 11th Senate district in the 108th Wisconsin Legislature (2027–2028). She previously served one term in the Wisconsin State Assembly, representing the 31st Assembly district during the 2023–2024 term.

== Early life and education ==
Schutt grew up in the town of Darien, Wisconsin, and was raised on her family's farm. Alongside her siblings, she helped raise cattle and work the farm. She participated in 4-H and FFA, including activities associated with the Walworth County Fair. She graduated from Delavan-Darien High School and earned her bachelor's degree in political science from the University of Wisconsin–Madison.

While attending the University of Wisconsin–Madison, Schutt became active in conservative politics on campus. She re-founded the Madison chapter of Young Americans for Freedom and founded a chapter of the Luce Society, an organization for conservative women. She interned with state representative Amy Loudenbeck and in the district office of congressman Paul Ryan, where she handled constituent services. During her senior year, she received a fellowship from the Clare Boothe Luce Center for Conservative Women.

After earning her bachelor's degree, Schutt worked as an accountant at The DeLong Company, an agricultural business. She subsequently worked as a legislative aide to Loudenbeck and also worked for representative Jesse James. She later served as chief of staff in the office of representative Tony Kurtz.

== Political career ==
In December 2021, Amy Loudenbeck announced that she would run for Secretary of State of Wisconsin, and therefore would not seek another term in the Wisconsin State Assembly. A few days later, Schutt announced that she would be a candidate for the Republican nomination in Loudenbeck's 31st Assembly district seat. Ultimately, two other candidates entered the Republican primary field, but Schutt prevailed with 42% of the vote. She went on to defeat the Democratic candidate, Whitewater city councilmember Brienne Brown, in the general election.

Schutt assumed office in January 2023. In the Assembly, she served as vice chair of the Assembly Committee on Criminal Justice and Public Safety, and served on the Assembly committees on Agriculture; Colleges and Universities; Health, Aging and Long-Term Care; and Transportation, as well as the Joint Committee on Information Policy and Technology.

Schutt was regarded as a conservative member of the Assembly Republican caucus. Her legislative record included opposition to government-granted right of first refusal (ROFR) provisions for electric utilities. She registered against 2023 Wisconsin Assembly Bill 470, which would have established a right of first refusal for incumbent utilities to construct certain electric transmission projects.

Schutt also supported legislation concerning families, children, and the protection of newborns. In 2023, she authored legislation with state senator Joan Ballweg that expanded Wisconsin's Safe Haven law to allow municipalities to install newborn infant safety devices, commonly known as safe-haven baby boxes, at hospitals, fire stations, and law-enforcement buildings. The legislation passed the Legislature and was signed by Governor Tony Evers as 2023 Wisconsin Act 79. The law permitted the installation of newborn infant safety devices under Wisconsin's Safe Haven Law.

Schutt also supported tax reductions and legislation intended to provide tax relief to families. In 2024, she introduced legislation to increase Wisconsin's income tax credit for married couples from $480 to $870. Schutt also supported legislation on other conservative policy priorities, including election administration, restrictions on gender-transition medical interventions for minors, and limitations on government-created guaranteed-income programs.

The 2024 legislative redistricting significantly affected Schutt's district, drawing Schutt into the same district as Republican Assembly Majority Leader Tyler August. Rather than running in a Republican primary against August, on May 31, 2024, Schutt announced that she would not seek reelection. She left office in January 2025.

=== Wisconsin FFA Foundation ===
After leaving the Assembly, Schutt became executive director of the Wisconsin FFA Foundation.

=== 2026 State Senate campaign ===
Schutt returned to politics in 2026. On February 6, 2026, following the announcement that state senator Stephen Nass would not seek reelection, Schutt announced her candidacy for the Republican nomination in the 11th Senate district.

During the campaign, Schutt emphasized fiscal responsibility, lower taxes, support for law enforcement, agricultural interests, and parental involvement in education. She also called for a moratorium on new data center development, arguing that local communities should be protected from the effects of rapid data-center expansion.

Schutt faced Sandy Wiedmeyer and Nick Polce in the Republican primary. She overwhelmingly won the primary on August 11, 2026, receiving 44.3% of the vote, winning nearly every municipality in Walworth County. She became the Republican nominee for the 11th Senate district in the 2026 Wisconsin Senate election. The general election is scheduled for November 3, 2026.

== Personal life and family ==
Schutt has two brothers and two sisters. She married Eric Barbour and moved to the village of Clinton, Rock County, Wisconsin. Schutt and Barbour have one child. Barbour is a legislative staffer and Republican Party organizer. He has worked for representative Samantha Kerkman in the Assembly and was campaign manager for state senator Van H. Wanggaard during his 2018 reelection campaign.

Schutt continues to farm with her family, raising cattle and growing crops.

== Electoral history ==
=== Wisconsin Assembly (2022) ===
Wisconsin Assembly, 31st District Election, 2022
Party	Candidate	Votes	%	±%
Republican Primary, August 9, 2022
Republican	Ellen Schutt	3,245	42.45%	
Republican	Maryann Zimmerman	2,405	31.46%	
Republican	Jason Dean	1,977	25.86%	
	Scattering	18	0.24%	
Plurality		840	10.99%	
Total votes		7,645	100.0%	
General Election, November 8, 2022
Republican	Ellen Schutt	14,704	59.15%	
Democratic	Brienne Brown	10,134	40.77%	
	Scattering	20	0.08%	
Plurality		4,570	18.38%	
Total votes		24,858	100.0%	+24.34%
Republican hold				

=== Wisconsin Senate (2026) ===
Wisconsin Senate, 11th District Election, 2026
Party	Candidate	Votes	%	±%
Republican Primary, August 11, 2026
Republican	Ellen Schutt	8,961	44.29%	
Republican	Sandy Wiedmeyer	7,270	35.93%	
Republican	Nick Polce	3,984	19.69%	
	Scattering	17	0.08%	
Plurality		1,691	8.36%	
Total votes		20,232	100.0%	
General Election, November 3, 2026 (unofficial results)
Republican	Ellen Schutt	48,761	60.72%	+2.40pp
Democratic	Adam Duda	31,549	39.28%	
Plurality		17,212	21.43%	
Total votes		80,310	100.0%	+4.13%
Republican hold				

Wisconsin State Assembly
Preceded by Amy Loudenbeck	Member of the Wisconsin State Assembly from the 31st district January 3, 2023 – January 6, 2025	Succeeded by Tyler August
