= Brienne Brown =

21st century American politician (born 1987)

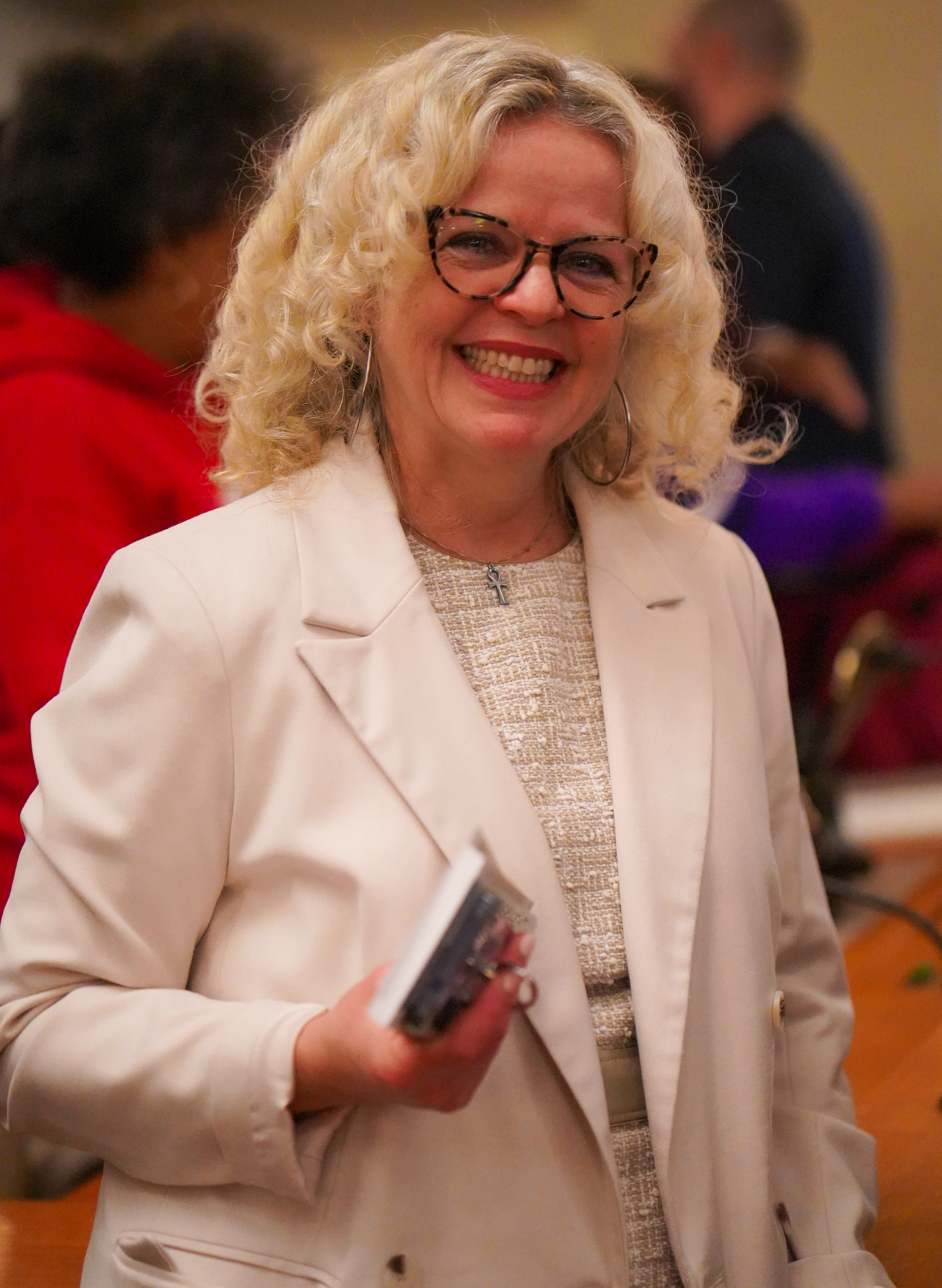
- Brown in 2026

Member of the Wisconsin State Assembly from the 43rd district
- Incumbent
- Assumed office January 6, 2025
- Preceded by: Jenna Jacobson

Personal details
- Born: Brienne Diebolt; February 4, 1973 (age 53) Landstuhl, Germany
- Party: Democratic
- Spouse: Karl
- Children: 2
- Education: University of Texas at Austin (BA, MS)
- Website: Official website Campaign website

Brienne D. Brown (née Diebolt; born February 4, 1973) is an American educator and Democratic politician from Whitewater, Wisconsin. She is a member of the Wisconsin State Assembly, representing Wisconsin's 43rd Assembly district since 2025. She previously served on the Whitewater city council.

== Early life and career ==
Brienne Diebolt was born on February 4, 1973, in Landstuhl Germany, on an American airbase, to Mark Diebolt and Jean Diebolt (née Youngstrom). As a young child, Diebolt and her family moved to Iran, where her father served in a military attaché with the Shah of Iran, Mohammad Reza Shah. Eventually she and her family moved to Austin, Texas, where Diebolt attended Stephen F. Austin High School, graduating in 1991. Following her graduation she briefly traveled the country, working in Alaska and Hawaii. Eventually Brown attended the University of Texas at Austin, where she obtained a Bachelor of Journalism, Communication and Media Studies in 2002.

After graduating from university, Diebolt began working for Stratfor, a geopolitical advising firm, as a journalist in the early 2000s. She worked for this firm for ten years before returning to the University of Texas at Austin and obtaining her master's degree in health education. She then began working for the Texas Department of State Health Services as an epidemiologist. During her work with the Texas government, she was president of the Council of State & Territorial Epidemiologists. It was around this time that Diebolt assumed the surname Brown, after marrying fellow Austin resident Karl Brown.

In 2012, Brown and her husband moved to Whitewater, Wisconsin, after Karl was offered a teaching position at the University of Wisconsin–Whitewater. Brienne began teaching community yoga and took on a role as an adjunct instructor at UW–Whitewater. She also engaged in community work, serving as the program director for the Whitewater Community Foundation, and the Whitewater Library Board.

== Political career ==
In 2018, Brown ran for Whitewater Common Council, but was defeated by Jim Allen. She then ran again in 2019 in a different district, campaigning in support of building a grocery store, expanding the public library, and expanding public transportation services in Whitewater. In the 2019 election, she defeated incumbent alderman Chris Grady. She ultimately served three terms on the council.

In 2022, Brown ran for Wisconsin's 31st Assembly district against Republican Ellen Schutt, a former aid to then incumbent representative Amy Loudenbeck. During the campaign Brown was endorsed by Planned Parenthood. In the election, Schutt defeated her with a 18.38% margin, with Brown citing the legislative gerrymander as a factor in her defeat.

Following the 2024 redistricting, which undid Wisconsin's gerrymander, incumbent Democrat Jenna Jacobson was drawn out of her district and into the neighboring 50th district. Brown then declared her candidacy for the open 43rd district. Without a primary opponent, Brown advanced to the general election where she faced Republican legislator Scott Johnson, who had been drawn out of the 33rd district and into this one due to redistricting. A moderate Republican, Johnson had criticized his party over their refusal to accept the results of the 2020 United States Presidential election. The district had a projected margin of 16 points Democratic. In the election, Brown defeated Johnson with a narrow 51.24% of the vote. Brown took office on January 6, 2025.

In February 2025, Brown, alongside senator Kelda Roys proposed legislation to prevent landlords from engaging in price collusion. In August, the two legislators introduced legislation to prohibit concealed carry on college campuses in the state. In September, Brown, alongside senator LaTonya Johnson introduced legislation to amend the state constitution to include an equal rights amendment.

== Personal life ==
Brown lives with her husband, Karl, her two children, and their two pets in Whitewater. Both Brienne and her husband work for the University of Wisconsin–Whitewater as educators, with Karl having a specialization in Cold War history.

== Electoral history ==
=== Whitewater Common Council, At-large district (2018) ===
Year	Election	Date	Elected				Defeated				Total	Plurality
2018	General	Apr. 3	Jim Allen (inc)	Nonpartisan	663	52.78%	Brienne Brown	Non.	587	46.74%	1,256	76

=== Whitewater Common Council, 3rd district (2019–2023) ===
Year	Election	Date	Elected				Defeated				Total	Plurality
2019	General	Apr. 2	Brienne Brown	Nonpartisan	192	60.76%	Chris Grady (inc)	Non.	122	38.61%	316	70
2021	General	Apr. 6	Brienne Brown (inc)	Nonpartisan	182	97.85%	--unopposed--				186	178
2023	General	Apr. 4	Brienne Brown (inc)	Nonpartisan	407	98.78%	--unopposed--				412	402

=== Wisconsin Assembly, 31st district (2022) ===
Year	Election	Date	Elected				Defeated				Total	Plurality
2022	General	Nov. 8	Ellen Schutt	Republican	14,704	59.15%	Brienne Brown	Dem.	10,134	40.77%	24,858	4,570

=== Wisconsin Assembly, 43rd district (2024) ===
Year	Election	Date	Elected				Defeated				Total	Plurality
2024	General	Nov. 5	Brienne Brown	Democratic	16,736	51.24%	Scott Johnson	Rep.	15,889	48.64%	32,664	847

Wisconsin State Assembly
Preceded by Jenna Jacobson	Member of the Wisconsin State Assembly from the 43rd district January 6, 2025 – present	Incumbent
