= Jenna Jacobson =

21st century American politician

Member-elect of the Wisconsin Senate from the 17th district
- Assuming office January 2027
- Succeeding: Howard Marklein

Member of the Wisconsin State Assembly
- Incumbent
- Assumed office January 6, 2025
- Preceded by: Tony Kurtz
- Succeeded by: Bill Oemichen (elect)
- Constituency: 50th district
- In office January 3, 2023 – January 6, 2025
- Preceded by: Don Vruwink
- Succeeded by: Brienne Brown
- Constituency: 43rd district

Personal details
- Born: Jennifer Shannon Imsdahl; February 4, 1982 (age 44) Brenham, Texas, U.S.
- Party: Democratic
- Spouse: Kyle Jacobson
- Children: 3
- Education: University of Wisconsin–River Falls; Purdue University (BA)
- Website: Official website Campaign website

Jennifer Shannon "Jenna" Jacobson (née Imsdahl; born February 4, 1982) is an American financial advisor and Democratic politician from Dane County, Wisconsin. She is a member of the Wisconsin State Assembly and member-elect of the Wisconsin Senate; she will represent Wisconsin's 17th Senate district in the 108th Wisconsin Legislature (2027–2028). In the Assembly, she has represented Wisconsin's 50th Assembly district since 2025, and previously represented the 43rd Assembly district during the 2023–2024 term.

== Biography ==
Jenna Jacobson was born Jennifer Shannon Imsdahl in Brenham, Texas, on February 4, 1982. She was raised in Polk County, Wisconsin, and graduated in 2000 from Frederic High School, in Frederic, Wisconsin. She attended University of Wisconsin–River Falls, but transferred to Purdue University, where she completed her bachelor's degree in consumer financial planning. While attending school in River Falls, she worked as a teller at the WESTconsin Credit Union. After transferring to Purdue, she worked for the Purdue Employees Federal Credit Union as a financial advisor.

In 2013, she moved back to Wisconsin with her family and settled in the village of Oregon, Wisconsin, in southern Dane County. She worked for several years as an analyst at the CUNA Mutual Group corporate headquarters and she is a long-time volunteer financial literacy coach. But she currently identifies as a stay-at-home mom.

== Political career ==
In 2017, she ran for and was elected to the Oregon village board, and was re-elected in 2019. Her term ended when she ran unsuccessfully for village president in 2021, but she was returned to the village board in the 2022 Spring election.

She has been active with the Oregon Housing Coalition, which seeks to bring affordable housing to Oregon, and, in early 2022, worked briefly for the Dane County government as a housing specialist. She was also appointed to the Governor's Council on Financial Literacy and Capability.

The 2022 redistricting, carried out by the Wisconsin Supreme Court, moved incumbent representative Don Vruwink into the 33rd Assembly district, creating a vacancy in the 43rd district which he had represented since 2017. Jacobson decided to enter the race for the Democratic nomination in the new 43rd district. At the time, the 43rd district comprised areas of southeast Dane County and north and central Rock County, stretching from the suburbs of Janesville to the suburbs of Madison. In the Democratic primary, Jacobson soundly defeated former Edgerton, Wisconsin, mayor Matt McIntyre. She went on to win the general election with 62% of the vote. She took office on January 3, 2023

Following the 2023 Wisconsin Supreme Court election, the Wisconsin Supreme Court took up redistricting again and struck down the 2022 map, compelling the Legislature to adopt a new map in early 2024. Jacobson was significantly affected by the change, with her home, Oregon, moving from the 43rd Assembly district to the 50th Assembly district—almost none of the territory she had previously represented moved with her into her new district. Her new district comprises areas of southwest Dane County and all of neighboring Green County. In the 2024 election, Jacobson defeated Republican Richard Johnson of Green County to win her second term.

In July 2025, Jacobson announced that she would run for Wisconsin Senate in 2026. She is seeking the 17th Senate district seat, currently held by Republican Howard Marklein. The 17th Senate district comprises the southwest corner of the state, from Crawford County to Green County. Two other candidates also sought the Democratic nomination in this district, child care provider Corrine Hendrickson and small business owner Lisa White; Jacobson secured the nomination with about 57% of the vote in the August primary. In the general election, the 17th Senate district was among the most hotly contested seats in the state Legislature, with about $5 million spent by the two campaigns. Jacobson prevailed, receiving 53% of the vote in the general election, and helping the Democrats achieve their first state Senate majority since 2012.

== Personal life and family ==
Jenna Imsdahl took the name Jacobson when she married her husband, Kyle Jacobson. The Jacobsons met when they were students at the University of Wisconsin–River Falls. They live in Oregon, Wisconsin, with their three children.

== Electoral history ==
=== Oregon Village President (2021) ===
Oregon, Wisconsin, Village President Election, 2021
Party	Candidate	Votes	%	±%
Nonpartisan Primary, February 16, 2021 (top two)
Nonpartisan	Randy Glysch	813	53.00%	
Nonpartisan	Jenna Jacobson	416	27.12%	
Nonpartisan	Jerry Bollig	301	19.62%	
	Scattering	4	0.26%	
Total votes		1,534	100.0%	
General Election, April 6, 2021
Nonpartisan	Randy Glysch	1,668	63.42%	
Nonpartisan	Jenna Jacobson	946	35.97%	
	Scattering	16	0.61%	
Plurality		722	27.45%	
Total votes		2,630	100.0%	

=== Wisconsin Assembly, 43rd district (2022) ===
Year	Election	Date	Elected				Defeated				Total	Plurality
2022	Primary	Aug. 9	Jenna Jacobson	Democratic	6,015	82.73%	Matt McIntyre	Dem.	1,251	17.21%	7,271	4,764
2022	General	Nov. 8	Jenna Jacobson	Democratic	19,681	62.26%	Marisa Voelkel	Rep.	11,903	37.66%	31,610	7,778

=== Wisconsin Assembly, 50th district (2024) ===
Year	Election	Date	Elected				Defeated				Total	Plurality
2024	General	Nov. 5	Jenna Jacobson	Democratic	20,418	56.27%	Rich Johnson	Rep.	15,841	43.66%	36,286	4,577

=== Wisconsin Senate (2026) ===
Year	Election	Date	Elected				Defeated				Total	Plurality
2026	Primary	Aug. 11	Jenna Jacobson	Democratic	13,816	57.25%	Corrine Hendrickson	Dem.	6,454	26.75%	24,131	7,362
2026	Primary	Aug. 11	Jenna Jacobson	Democratic	13,816	57.25%	Lisa Rose White	Dem.	3,847	15.94%	24,131	7,362
2026	General	Nov. 3	Jenna Jacobson	Democratic	43,775	53.80%	Howard Marklein (inc)	Rep.	37,593	46.20%	81,368	6,182

Wisconsin State Assembly
Preceded by Don Vruwink	Member of the Wisconsin State Assembly from the 43rd district January 3, 2023 – January 6, 2025	Succeeded by Brienne Brown
Preceded by Tony Kurtz	Member of the Wisconsin State Assembly from the 50th district January 6, 2025 – present	Incumbent
