= Trevor Jung =

American politician (born 1996)

Member-elect of the Wisconsin Senate from the 21st district
- Assuming office January 4, 2027
- Succeeding: Van H. Wanggaard

Member of the Racine Common Council from the 9th district
- In office April 2019 – August 27, 2021
- Preceded by: Terry McCarthy
- Succeeded by: Terry McCarthy

Personal details
- Born: 1995 (age 30–31) Krasnodar, Russia
- Party: Democratic
- Spouse: Grace Girard (m. 2026)
- Education: University of Wisconsin–Milwaukee
- Website: Campaign website

Trevor S. Jung (born 1995) is an American public administrator and Democratic politician from Racine, Wisconsin. He is a member-elect of the Wisconsin Senate, and will represent Wisconsin's 21st Senate district in the 2027–2028 term. He has served as transit director of Racine since 2021, and previously served as a member of the city council.

== Early life ==
Trevor Jung was born in Russia in 1995. At age two, he was adopted from an orphanage in Krasnodar, and was brought to Racine, Wisconsin, where he was raised and educated. He graduated from Jerome I. Case High School and went on to attend the University of Wisconsin–Milwaukee, graduating with a bachelor's degree in urban studies.

== Political career ==
Before reaching adulthood, Jung became involved in politics and local affairs. At age 12, he became an active volunteer for Barack Obama's 2008 presidential campaign. In high school, Jung was outspoken in local affairs, advocating on behalf of local referendums for public school funding. While in college in Milwaukee, he remained active in the Racine community with organizations like the Root River Council and Visioning a Greater Racine. He was a vocal supporter of state representative Cory Mason in his campaign for mayor of Racine in 2017.

Shortly after completing his college education, Jung launched his first bid for public office, running for a seat on the Racine city council. He was elected in 2019, at age 23, becoming Racine's youngest alderman since 1862. He was elected to two terms on the city council, but resigned during his second term to serve as the director of Ryde Racine, the city's public transit system.

In the fall of 2025, Jung announced that he would run for Wisconsin Senate in 2026, challenging incumbent Republican Van H. Wanggaard in the 21st Senate district. Jung faced no opposition for the Democratic nomination. Wanggaard ultimately decided not to run for re-election, and Jung instead faced a general election race against Franklin businessman Jim Croft. The race was seen as potentially decisive for control of the state Senate in 2026, and became one of the most contentious races in the state legislature that year, with more than $2 million spent on campaign advertisements. In the November 2026 election, Jung prevailed with roughly 58% of the vote. He is scheduled to take office in January 2027.

== Personal life and family ==
Trevor Jung married Grace Girard in February 2026, they reside in Racine.

== Electoral history ==
=== Racine city council (2019, 2021) ===
Year	Election	Date	Elected				Defeated				Total	Plurality
2019	General	Apr. 2	Trevor Jung	Nonpartisan	576	74.04%	Justin L. Coe	Non.	193	24.81%	778	383
2021	General	Apr. 6	Trevor Jung (inc)	Nonpartisan	379	95.71%	--unopposed--				396	

=== Wisconsin Senate (2026) ===
Wisconsin Senate, 21st District Election, 2026
Party	Candidate	Votes	%	±%
General Election, November 3, 2026 (unofficial results)
Democratic	Trevor Jung	43,325	56.66%	
Republican	Jim Croft	33,145	43.34%	
Plurality		10,180	13.31%	
Total votes		76,470	100.0%	+16.82%
Democratic gain from Republican				
