= Clinton Anderson (Wisconsin politician) =

American politician (born 1993)

Member of the Wisconsin State Assembly from the 45th district
- Incumbent
- Assumed office January 3, 2023
- Preceded by: Mark Spreitzer

President of the City Council of Beloit, Wisconsin
- In office April 2021 – April 2022
- Preceded by: Regina Dunkin
- Succeeded by: Regina Dunkin

Personal details
- Born: May 26, 1993 (age 33) Beloit, Wisconsin, U.S.
- Party: Democratic
- Spouse: married
- Education: University of Wisconsin–Rock County (AS); University of Wisconsin–Whitewater (BS)
- Website: Official website Campaign website

Clinton Michael Anderson (born May 26, 1993) is an American Democratic politician from Beloit, Wisconsin. He is a member of the Wisconsin State Assembly, representing Wisconsin's 45th Assembly district since January 2023. He also served several years as a member of the Beloit city council, and was president of the city council in 2021.

== Biography ==
Clinton Anderson was and raised in the city of Beloit, Wisconsin. He graduated from the Beloit public schools in 2011, and received an associate's degree from University of Wisconsin–Whitewater at Rock County in 2016. He continued his education at the University of Wisconsin–Whitewater and received his bachelor's degree in psychology in 2018. Since graduating from college, he has worked as a volunteer coordinator at a shelter for survivors of domestic violence.

== Political career ==
Anderson made his first run for elected office in 2016, when he ran for Wisconsin State Assembly in the 31st Assembly district, challenging incumbent Republican Amy Loudenbeck. He won the Democratic primary with 62% of the vote, but was defeated by Loudenbeck in the general election.

The following Spring, Anderson was elected to the Beloit city council and was subsequently re-elected in 2019 and 2021. He served a one-year term as president of the city council from April 2021 through April 2022.

In 2022, incumbent Wisconsin state representative Mark Spreitzer announced he would run for Wisconsin State Senate and would therefore not run for re-election in his Assembly seat. Within days, Anderson announced his candidacy for the 45th Assembly district seat being vacated by Spreitzer. He prevailed in the Democratic primary, defeating public school teacher Ben Dorscheid. He went on to defeat Republican Jeff Klett in the general election, receiving 55% of the vote.

Anderson was sworn in on January 3, 2023. In August, he drafted legislation which would mandate campaigns disclose whether artificial intelligence was used in political advertising. In November, Anderson co-authored a bill alongside fellow freshman representative Nate Gustafson to launch a pilot program for medicinal use of psilocybin for veterans.

In 2024, Anderson was re-elected to a second term unopposed.

In December 2025, Anderson, alongside representative Jenna Jacobson and senators Mark Spreitzer and André Jacque introduced legislation to roll back regulations on wedding barnes and other rural celebration venues.

== Personal life and family ==
Clinton's parents are both active in Beloit government. His father is a building inspector for the city and his mother is a secretary for the school district. His brother, Spencer Anderson, served as an elected member of the Beloit school board.

== Electoral history ==
=== Wisconsin Assembly, district 31 (2016) ===
Year	Election	Date	Elected				Defeated				Total	Plurality
2016	Primary	Aug. 9	Clinton Anderson	Democratic	1,652	61.90%	Don Prestia	Dem.	1,009	37.80%	2,669	643
2016	General	Nov. 8	Amy Loudenbeck (inc)	Republican	18,465	64.02%	Clinton Anderson	Dem.	10,348	35.88%	28,843	8,117

=== Wisconsin Assembly, district 45 (2022–present) ===
Year	Election	Date	Elected				Defeated				Total	Plurality
2022	Primary	Aug. 9	Clinton Anderson	Democratic	2,431	64.52%	Ben Dorscheid	Dem.	1,329	35.27%	3,768	1,102
2022	General	Nov. 8	Clinton Anderson	Democratic	11,636	55.75%	Jeff Klett	Rep.	9,221	44.18%	20,872	2,415
2024	General	Nov. 5	Clinton Anderson (inc)	Democratic	19,864	95.87%	--unopposed--				20,719	

Wisconsin State Assembly
Preceded by Mark Spreitzer	Member of the Wisconsin State Assembly from the 45th district January 3, 2023 – present	Incumbent
Political offices
Preceded by Regina Dunkin	President of the City Council of Beloit, Wisconsin; April 2021 – April 2022	Succeeded by Regina Dunkin
