= 2026 Wisconsin Senate election =

- November 3, 2026

17 of 33 seats in the Wisconsin Senate 17 seats needed for a majority
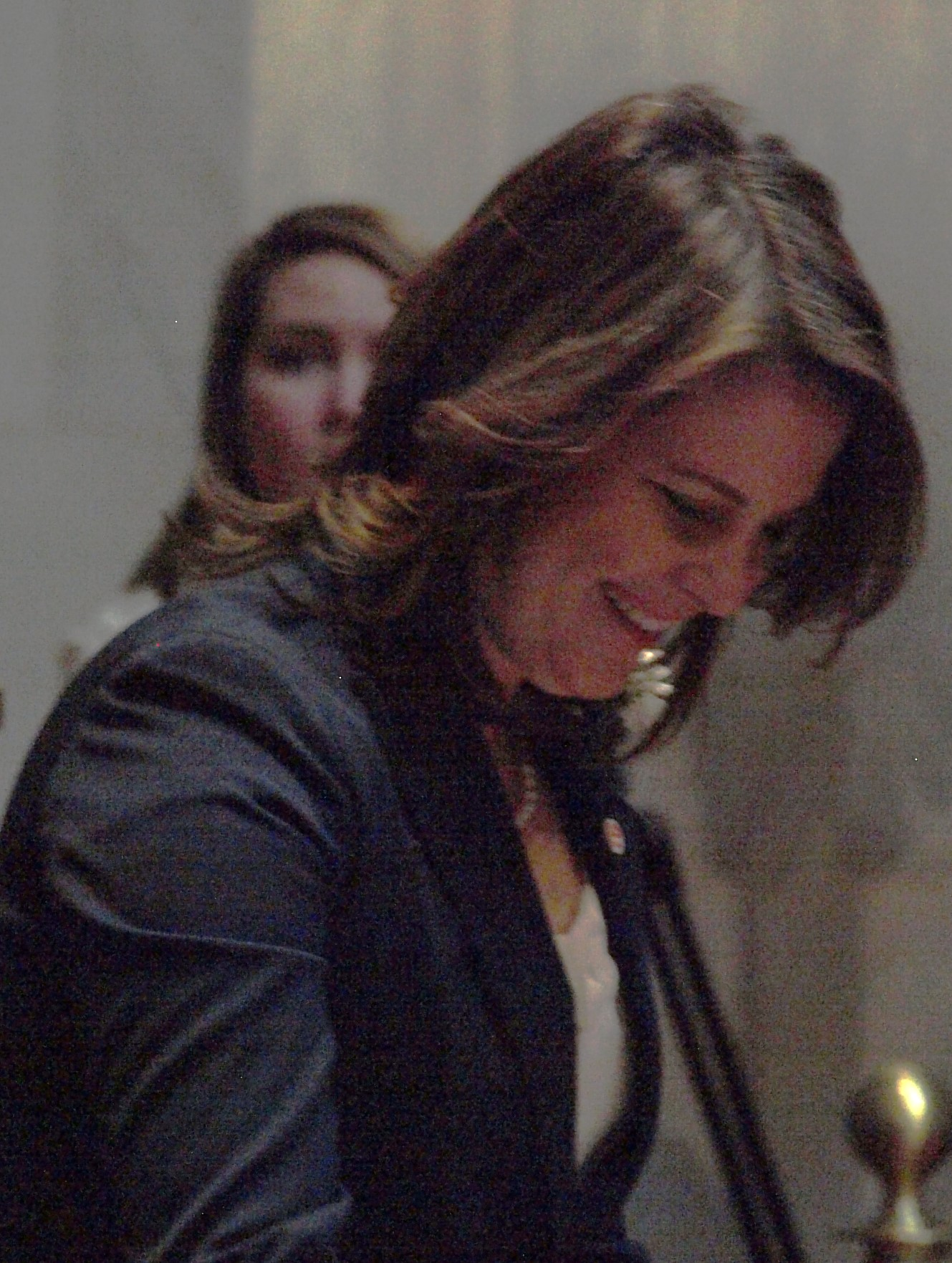

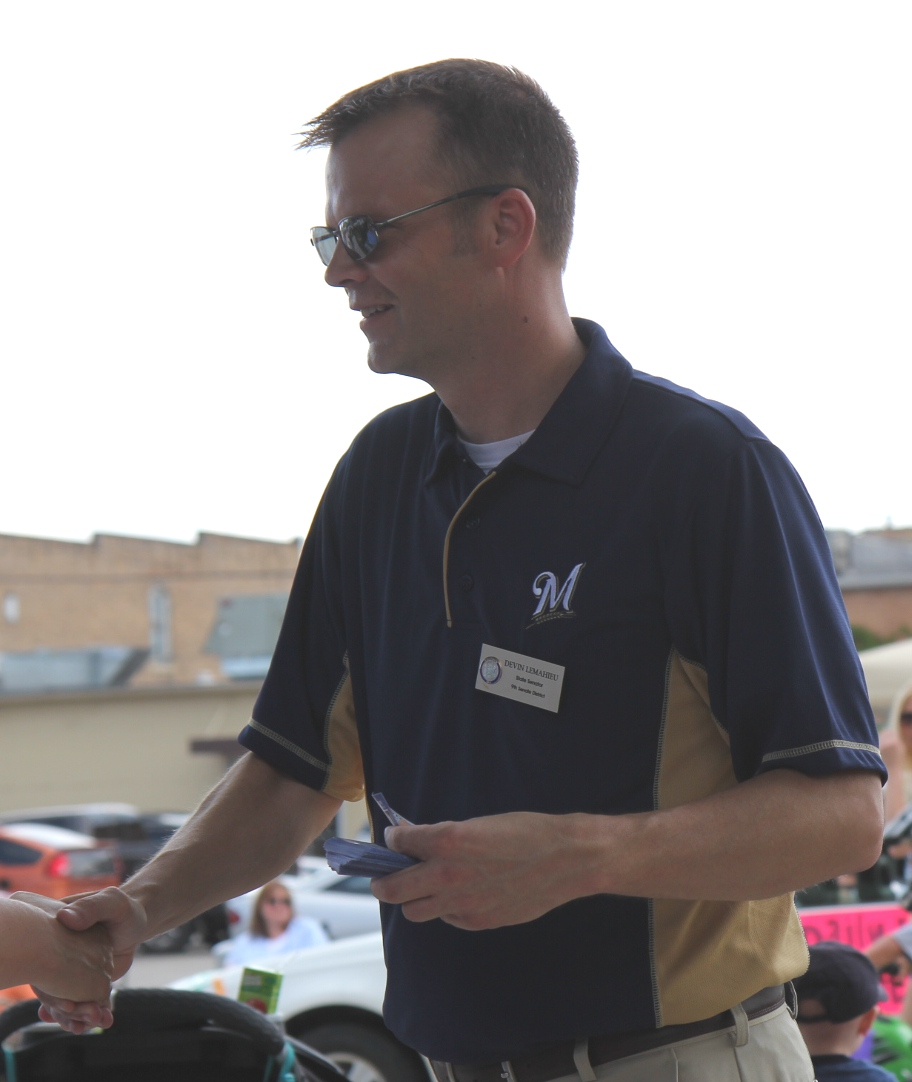
	Majority party	Minority party
Leader	Dianne Hesselbein	Devin LeMahieu (retired)
Party	Democratic	Republican
Leader since	December 1, 2023	January 4, 2021
Leader's seat	27th–Middleton	9th–Oostburg
Last election	10 seats, 56.60%	6 seats, 42.74%
Seats before	15	18
Seats won	8	9
Seats after	18	15
Seat change	▲3	▼3
- Map of the incumbents: Democratic hold Democratic gain Republican hold No election
President before election
Mary Felzkowski
Republican
Elected President
Mark Spreitzer
Democratic

The 2026 Wisconsin Senate election was held on November 3, 2026. Seventeen of the 33 seats in the Wisconsin Senate were up for election—those in the odd-numbered districts. Before the election, Republicans held 12 of those 17 seats and held a 18–15 majority in the Senate overall. The primary election was held on August 11, 2026.

This was the first election for these districts after the 2024 redistricting, which occurred as a result of the Wisconsin Supreme Court decision in Clarke v. Wisconsin Elections Commission. Democrats won the four most competitive Senate races, flipping three Republican-held seats and winning their first Senate majority since the 2008 Wisconsin Senate election. Democrats are projected to enter the 108th Wisconsin Legislature with 18 of 33 seats.

== Background ==
=== Partisan background ===
In the 2024 U.S. presidential election, Republican nominee Donald Trump won 9 districts, while Democratic nominee Kamala Harris won 8 districts. Republicans currently hold three districts where Harris won in 2024: District 5 (Harris +5.81%), represented by Rob Hutton; District 17 (Harris +1.03%), represented by Howard Marklein; and District 21 (Harris +1.23%), represented by Van Wanggaard.

Harris 40–50% 50–60% 60–70% 70–80% / Trump 50–60% 60–70%

=== Redistricting ===
This election was significantly affected by the legislative maps drawn as a result of the Wisconsin Supreme Court decision in Clarke v. Wisconsin Elections Commission, which declared the previous legislative district map to be unconstitutional on December 22, 2023. The court was in the process of selecting a remedial plan, when the legislature chose to embrace the remedial map proposal from Governor Tony Evers. Evers signed the plan into law on February 19, 2024.

=== 2024 elections ===
In 2024, Democrats gained four seats in the Senate under the new maps, with the expectation they would not be able to win a majority then because only even-numbered seats were up for election that year. During the 2024 campaign, both parties spent heavily on the competitive races in that cycle. The Democrats' gains put them on a path towards winning a majority in 2026, where three senate districts could determine control of the chamber.

Democrats last won a majority of seats in the state senate in the 2012 recall elections, but they last seated a majority of seats in a session after the 2008 elections.

== Campaign ==
=== Primary elections ===
As part of their effort to gain control of the Senate, the Senate Democratic caucus has endorsed several candidates in competitive districts in an attempt to clear the field for their preferred candidates. In the 5th district the State Senate Democratic Campaign Committee supported representative Robyn Vining over businesswoman Sarah Harrison, who withdrew from the race in early January citing a lack of funding. In the 17th district, one candidate, business owner Matt Roboin, declined to run, citing the Committee's endorsement of representative Jenna Jacobson for the nomination. In the 21st district, city official Trevor Jung is running unopposed for the nomination after being endorsed by the Committee. This strategy received criticism from candidates running in the various districts, who argued that it was undemocratic for the party campaign arm to intervene in primary elections and give support to certain candidates over others.

== Predictions ==
Senators are running for the first time under new districts implemented as a result of Clarke v. Wisconsin Elections Commission giving Democrats an opportunity to win control of the chamber for the first time in over a decade. Some Wisconsin Democrats consider the Senate to be "the most flippable chamber in the country" due to the new districts as well as key Republican retirements from competitive seats.

=== Statewide ===
Source	Ranking	As of
Marquette University Law	Lean D (flip)	July 20, 2026
Sabato's Crystal Ball	Lean D (flip)	October 16, 2026
State Navigate	Likely D (flip)	September 22, 2026

=== Competitive districts ===
District	Incumbent	Last result (Note: Held under different district lines)	Marquette July 20, 2026	State Navigate (Note: Ratings simplified from percentages: <60% = "Tilt"; 60–75% = "Lean"; 75–95% = "Likely"; >95% = "Safe") Nov. 2, 2026
5th	Rob Hutton (retiring)	53.24% R	Lean D (flip)	Likely D (flip)
9th	Devin LeMahieu (retiring)	93.64% R	Safe R	Likely R
17th	Howard Marklein	60.15% D	Tossup	Likely D (flip)
21st	Van H. Wanggaard (retiring)	94.14% R	Lean D (flip)	Likely D (flip)
25th	Romaine Quinn (switched districts)	56.99% R	Lean R	Likely R
31st	Jeff Smith	50.42% D	Lean D	Likely D
Overall			Dem – 17; Rep – 15; 1 Tossup	Dem – 18; Rep – 15

== Summary ==
		Party (majority caucus shading)		Total
		Democratic	Republican	Total
Last election (2024)		10	6	16
Total after last election (2024)		15	18	33
Total before this election		15	18	33
Up for election		5	12	17
of which:	Incumbent retiring	0	6	6
of which:	Vacated	0	0	0
of which:	Open	0	7	7
of which:	Unopposed	2	0	2
This election		8	9	17
Change from last election		▲3	▼3	
Total after this election		18	15	33
Change in total		▲3	▼3	

== Outgoing incumbents ==
Map of the incumbents: Republican incumbent Republican incumbent retiring Democratic incumbent No incumbent No election

=== Retiring ===
- Rob Hutton (R–Brookfield), representing district 5 since 2023, retired.
- André Jacque (R–New Franken), representing district 1 since 2019, retired.
- Jesse James (R–Thorp), representing district 23 since 2023, retired.
- Stephen Nass (R–Whitewater), representing district 11 since 2015, retired.
- Van Wanggaard (R–Racine), representing district 21 since 2015, retired.
- Devin LeMahieu (R–Oostburg), representing district 9 since 2015, retired.

=== Lost re-election ===
- Howard Marklein (R–Spring Green), representing district 17 since 2015, lost reelection to Jenna Jacobson (D–Oregon)

== Race summary ==
Dist.	2024 Pres.	Incumbent			This election	
Dist.	2024 Pres.	Member	Party	First elected	Status	Candidates
01	R+20.3	André Jacque	Rep.	2018	Incumbent retired. New member elected. Republican hold.	▌ ✓ Nic Cravillion (Rep.); ▌Mark Becker (Ind.)
03	D+27.7	Tim Carpenter	Dem.	2002	Incumbent re-elected.	▌ ✓ Tim Carpenter (Dem.)
05	D+5.9	Rob Hutton	Rep.	2022	Incumbent retired. New member elected. Democratic gain.	▌ ✓ Robyn Vining (Dem.); ▌Mike Roberts (Rep.)
07	D+28.5	Chris Larson	Dem.	2010	Incumbent re-elected.	▌ ✓ Chris Larson (Dem.); ▌Mike Moeller (Rep.)
09	R+15.7	Devin LeMahieu	Rep.	2014	Incumbent retired. New member elected. Republican hold.	▌ ✓ Amy Binsfeld (Rep.); ▌Christian Ellis (Ind.)
11	R+28.0	Stephen Nass	Rep.	2014	Incumbent retired. New member elected. Republican hold.	▌ ✓ Ellen Schutt (Rep.); ▌Adam Duda (Dem.)
13	R+30.9	John Jagler	Rep.	2021 (special)	Incumbent re-elected	▌ ✓ John Jagler (Rep.); ▌Sasha Ripley (Dem.)
15	D+7.7	Mark Spreitzer	Dem.	2022	Incumbent re-elected.	▌ ✓ Mark Spreitzer (Dem.); ▌Scott Fleming (Rep.)
17	D+1.0	Howard Marklein	Rep.	2014	Incumbent lost re-election. Democratic gain.	▌ ✓ Jenna Jacobson (Dem.); ▌Howard Marklein (Rep.)
19	R+25.8	Rachael Cabral-Guevara	Rep.	2022	Incumbent re-elected.	▌ ✓ Rachael Cabral-Guevara (Rep.); ▌Emily Tseffos (Dem.)
21	D+1.2	Van H. Wanggaard	Rep.	2010 (Note: Removed from office by recall in 2012); 2014	Incumbent retired. New member elected. Democratic gain.	▌ ✓ Trevor Jung (Dem.); ▌Jim Croft (Rep.)
23	R+35.9	None (open seat)			No incumbent. New member elected. Republican hold.	▌ ✓ Romaine Quinn (Rep.); ▌Jeff Foster (Dem.)
25	R+13.6	Romaine Quinn	Rep.	2022	Ran for 23rd district. New member elected. Republican hold.	▌ ✓ Erik Severson (Rep.); ▌Charly Ray (Dem.)
27	D+52.7	Dianne Hesselbein	Dem.	2022	Incumbent re-elected.	▌ ✓ Dianne Hesselbein (Dem.)
29	R+19.3	Cory Tomczyk	Rep.	2022	Incumbent re-elected.	▌ ✓ Cory Tomczyk (Rep.); ▌Gillian Battino (Dem.)
31	D+2.2	Jeff Smith	Dem.	2018	Incumbent re-elected.	▌ ✓ Jeff Smith (Dem.); ▌Michele Magadance Skinner (Rep.)
31	D+2.2	Jesse James (Note: Redistricted from the 23rd district.)	Rep.	2022	Incumbent retired.	▌ ✓ Jeff Smith (Dem.); ▌Michele Magadance Skinner (Rep.)
33	R+33.7	Chris Kapenga	Rep.	2015 (special)	Incumbent re-elected.	▌ ✓ Chris Kapenga (Rep.); ▌Mike Van Someren (Dem.)

== Detailed results ==
=== District 1 ===
Incumbent Republican André Jacque did not seek re-election. Jacque's district director, Nic Cravillion, won the election to succeed him, defeating independent candidate Mark Becker.

Three other Republicans ran in the Republican primary: Katie Baney, a former congressional staffer for U.S. representative Paul Ryan and U.S. senator Ron Johnson; Barbara Bittner, chair of the Republican Party of Calumet County; and farmer Jacob VandenPlas. Throughout the primary campaign the four candidates ran on similar conservative issues, differentiating themselves on certain themes and backgrounds. Cravillion's campaign had a focus on lowering taxes and lowering spending, and received the support of several elected officials in the district, including former senator Alan Lasee, state representative Garey Bies, and outgoing senator Jacque. Baney's campaign expressed her support for the Make America Healthy Again movement, school choice, and the 2nd amendment while garnering support from various conservative activist organizations in the state, including the NRA Political Victory Fund, Wisconsin Family Action PAC, and Turning Point Action. Bittner, notably, made one focus of her campaign support for the lapsed Knowles-Nelson Stewardship Program, considered a Democratic issue in the legislature. VandenPlas made veterans issues a central theme of his campaign. Cravillion won the nomination, defeating Bittner by a 16-point margin.

In the general election, Cravillion faced independent Luxemburg small business owner Mark Becker. Previously, Democrat Sean Grorich ran for the district, but withdrew and endorsed Becker.

County results: Cravillion—30–40% Cravillion—40–50% Cravillion—60–70% Bittner—30–40% Bittner—50–60%

District 1 Republican primary
Party	Candidate	Votes	%
Republican	Nic Cravillion	9,264	40.69
Republican	Barbara Bittner	5,727	25.15
Republican	Katie Baney	4,915	21.59
Republican	Jacob VandenPlas	2,848	12.51
Write-in		14	0.06
Total votes		22,768	100.0

District 1 general election (unofficial results)
Party	Candidate	Votes	%	±%
Republican	Nic Cravillion	49,821	57.96%	−1.57pp
Independent	Mark Becker	36,141	42.04%	
Total votes		85,962	100.0%	−1.61%
Republican hold				

=== District 3 ===
Incumbent Democrat Tim Carpenter was re-elected without opposition.

District 3 general election results (unofficial results)
Party	Candidate	Votes	%	±%
Democratic	Tim Carpenter (incumbent)	27,266	98.24%	
Write-in		489	1.76%	
Total votes		27,755	100.0%	–31.52%
Democratic hold				

=== District 5 ===
Incumbent Republican Rob Hutton did not seek re-election. State representative Robyn Vining (D–Wauwatosa) was elected to succeed him, defeating Republican small business Mike Roberts of Pewaukee.

Under Wisconsin's 2024 maps, the 5th Senate district comprised parts of western Milwaukee County, and eastern Waukesha County. It included the cities of Brookfield and Pewaukee, and the villages of Elm Grove and Pewaukee, as well as most of the cities of Wauwatosa and West Allis, and parts of the cities of Milwaukee and Waukesha. These western Milwaukee suburbs and Waukesha-area exurbs were a Republican stronghold as recently as 2014, but moved steadily away from the Republicans since the election of Donald Trump. The 5th Senate district was a top target of Democrats in 2026; Vining won the election with 57% of the vote.

District 5 general election (unofficial results)
Party	Candidate	Votes	%	±%
Democratic	Robyn Vining	50,107	57.00%	+10.35pp
Republican	Mike Roberts	37,794	43.00%	−10.24pp
Total votes		87,901	100.0%	−4.54%
Democratic gain from Republican				

=== District 7 ===
Incumbent Democrat Chris Larson won re-election, defeating Republican Mike Moeller.

District 7 general election (unofficial results)
Party	Candidate	Votes	%	±%
Democratic	Chris Larson (incumbent)	37,877	83.53%	+16.28pp
Republican	Mike Moeller	7,424	16.37%	−16.27pp
Total votes		45,347	100.0%	−43.79%
Democratic hold				

=== District 9 ===
Incumbent Republican senator and majority leader Devin LeMahieu did not seek re-election. Former state representative Amy Binsfeld (R–Mosel) was elected to succeed him, defeating independent Christian Ellis in the general election.

District 9 general election (unofficial results)
Party	Candidate	Votes	%	±%
Republican	Amy Binsfeld	41,378	56.22%	
Independent	Christian Ellis	32,225	43.78%	
Total votes		73,603	100.0%	+19.17%
Republican hold				

=== District 11 ===
Incumbent Republican Stephen Nass did not seek re-election. Former state representative Ellen Schutt (R–Clinton) was elected to succeed him, defeating Democrat Adam Duda.

Two other candidates ran in the Republican Party primary: Army veteran Nick Polce and former Kenosha County Republican chair Sandy Weidmeyer

One other candidate ran in the Democratic Party primary, retired teacher Steven Doelder.

Schutt prevailed in the general election, receiving 60% of the vote.

District 11 Republican primary
Party	Candidate	Votes	%
Republican	Ellen Schutt	8,961	44.29
Republican	Sandy Wiedmeyer	7,270	35.93
Republican	Nick Polce	3,984	19.69
Write-in		17	0.08
Total votes		20,232	100.0

District 11 Democratic primary
Party	Candidate	Votes	%
Democratic	Adam Duda	7,807	58.39
Democratic	Steven J. Doelder	5,536	41.40
Write-in		28	0.21
Total votes		13,371	100.0

District 11 general election (unofficial results)
Party	Candidate	Votes	%	±%
Republican	Ellen Schutt	48,761	60.72%	+2.40pp
Democratic	Adam Duda	31,549	39.28%	−2.32pp
Total votes		80,310	100.0%	+4.13%
Republican hold				

=== District 13 ===
Incumbent Republican John Jagler won re-election, defeating Democrat Sasha Ripley.

One independent candidate, Beaver Dam city council member Jeff Bierman, announced a campaign but did not submit paperwork to get on the ballot.

District 13 general election (unofficial results)
Party	Candidate	Votes	%	±%
Republican	John Jagler (incumbent)	46,762	63.10%	
Democratic	Sasha Ripley	27,349	36.90%	
Total votes		74,111	100.0%	+15.92%
Republican hold				

=== District 15 ===
Incumbent Democrat Mark Spreitzer won re-election, defeating Republican Scott Fleming and independent Christopher Dean.

District 15 general election (unofficial results)
Party	Candidate	Votes	%	±%
Democratic	Mark Spreitzer (incumbent)	41,249	57.35%	−4.02pp
Republican	Scott Fleming	27,304	37.96%	−0.58pp
Independent	Christopher Dean	3,368	4.68%	
Total votes		71,921	100.0%	−4.44%
Democratic hold				

=== District 17 ===
Incumbent Republican Howard Marklein was defeated in the general election by state representative Jenna Jacobson (D–Oregon), who will succeed him in this seat.

Two other candidates ran in the Democratic Party primary: New Glarus child care advocate Corrine Hendrickson, and Potosi small business owner Lisa White. Jacobson won the primary by a 31-point margin.

County results: Jacobson—50–60% Jacobson—60–70%

District 17 Democratic primary
Party	Candidate	Votes	%
Democratic	Jenna Jacobson	13,816	57.25%
Democratic	Corrine Hendrickson	6,454	26.75%
Democratic	Lisa Rose White	3,847	15.94%
Write-in		14	0.06%
Total votes		24,131	100.0%

District 17 general election (unofficial results)
Party	Candidate	Votes	%	±%
Democratic	Jenna Jacobson	43,775	53.80%	+13.98pp
Republican	Howard Marklein (incumbent)	37,593	46.20%	−13.95pp
Total votes		81,368	100.0%	+10.22%
Democratic gain from Republican				

=== District 19 ===
Incumbent Republican Rachael Cabral-Guevara won re-election, defeating Democratic rural organizer Emily Tseffos.

District 19 general election (unofficial results)
Party	Candidate	Votes	%	±%
Republican	Rachael Cabral-Guevara (incumbent)	51,175	59.33%	+5.31pp
Democratic	Emily Tseffos	35,081	40.67%	−5.27pp
Total votes		86,256	100.0%	+8.72%
Republican hold				

=== District 21 ===
Incumbent Republican Van H. Wanggaard did not seek reelection. The Democratic candidate, Racine transit director Trevor Jung, was elected to succeed him, defeating Republican businessman Jim Croft.

District 21 general election (unofficial results)
Party	Candidate	Votes	%	±%
Democratic	Trevor Jung	43,325	56.66%	
Republican	Jim Croft	33,145	43.34%	
Total votes		76,470	100.0%	+16.82%
Democratic gain from Republican				

=== District 23 ===
Incumbent Republican Jesse James did not seek re-election after being drawn out of this district due to redistricting. Twenty-fifth district incumbent, Republican Romaine Quinn, was drawn into this district and was elected to succeed him, defeating Democrat Jeff Foster.

Foster, a former social worker, won the Democratic Party nomination over Richard Pulcher.

District 23 Democratic primary
Party	Candidate	Votes	%
Democratic	Jeff Foster	8,122	67.32%
Democratic	Richard Pulcher	3,925	32.53%
Write-in		17	0.14%
Total votes		12,064	100.0%

District 23 general election (unofficial results)
Party	Candidate	Votes	%	±%
Republican	Romaine Quinn	48,648	65.09%	
Democratic	Jeff Foster	26,087	34.91%	
Total votes		74,735	100.0%	+25.55%
Republican hold				

=== District 25 ===
Incumbent Republican Romaine Quinn was drawn out of this district due to redistricting and ran in the 23rd district instead. Former state representative Erik Severson (R–Alden) was elected to succeed him, defeating Democrat Charly Ray, a member of the Bayfield County board of supervisors.

Severson won the Republican Party nomination over former state representative Angie Sapik (R–Lake Nebagamon). During the campaign, the two candidates ran on similar conservative platforms, vowing to end the 400-year property tax increases that arose from governor Tony Evers' 2023 partial budget veto, supporting returning the state surplus to taxpayers, as well as supporting local communities cooperating with ICE. The two candidates also supported legislation to hold AI companies liable for harm they cause and increasing funding for rural defense lawyers. Both candidates also rejected a moratorium on new AI data centers in favor of further regulations, while Sapik criticized Severson, who she claimed was financially backed by data center interests from former state representative Adam Jarchow. One area where the two candidates differed was on the status of the Knowles-Nelson Stewardship fund, with Sapik supporting its renewal while Severson opposed it. Severson also received support from several established Republican figures, including Senate president Mary Felzkowski and former representative Michelle Litjens, the wife of Speaker Robin Vos. Severson defeated Sapik by a seven-point margin.

Results by county: Severson—50–60% Severson—70–80% Sapik—50–60% Sapik—60–70%

Results by precinct: Severson—50–60% Severson—60–70% Severson—70–80% Severson—80–90% Sapik—50–60% Sapik—60–70% Sapik—70–80% Sapik—80–90%

District 25 Republican primary
Party	Candidate	Votes	%
Republican	Erik Severson	13,220	53.88%
Republican	Angie Sapik	11,302	46.06%
Write-in		14	0.06%
Total votes		24,536	100.0%

District 25 general election (unofficial results)
Party	Candidate	Votes	%	±%
Republican	Erik Severson	45,820	52.78%	−4.21pp
Democratic	Charly Ray	40,987	47.22%	+4.25pp
Total votes		86,807	100.0%	+4.61%
Republican hold				

=== District 27 ===
Incumbent Democratic senator and minority leader Dianne Hesselbein was re-elected without an opponent on the ballot. She easily prevailed over a write-in campaign by progressive activist and scholar Nathan Kalmoe.

District 27 general election (unofficial results)
Party	Candidate	Votes	%	±%
Democratic	Dianne Hesselbein (incumbent)	87,902		
Total votes		87,902	100.0%	−8.94%
Democratic hold				

=== District 29 ===
Incumbent Republican Cory Tomczyk won re-election, defeating Democratic retired radiologist Gillian Battino of Wausau.

District 29 general election (unofficial results)
Party	Candidate	Votes	%	±%
Republican	Cory Tomczyk (incumbent)	43,989	55.96%	−6.47pp
Democratic	Gillian Battino	34,618	44.04%	+6.54pp
Total votes		78,607	100.0%	−1.05%
Republican hold				

=== District 31 ===
Incumbent Democrat Jeff Smith won re-election, defeating Republican Michele Magadance Skinner, a member of the Eau Claire county board of supervisors.

The twenty-third district incumbent, Republican Jesse James, was drawn into this district but opted to retire rather than run in an incumbent-vs-incumbent election.

District 31 general election (unofficial results)
Party	Candidate	Votes	%	±%
Democratic	Jeff Smith (incumbent)	48,231	58.44%	+8.02pp
Republican	Michele Magadance Skinner	34,302	41.56%	−7.96pp
Total votes		82,533	100.0%	+6.88%
Democratic hold				

=== District 33 ===
Incumbent Republican senator and former Senate president Chris Kapenga won re-election, defeating Democratic attorney Mike Van Someren of Delafield.

While running for re-election for this office, Kapenga is also running in the special election for Waukesha county executive, and has said if elected, he would resign his Senate seat in January 2027.

District 33 general election (unofficial results)
Party	Candidate	Votes	%	±%
Republican	Chris Kapenga (incumbent)	65,015	65.89%	
Democratic	Mike Van Someren	33,657	34.11%	
Total votes		98,672	100.0%	+41.29%
Republican hold				

== See also ==
- Redistricting in Wisconsin
  - Clarke v. Wisconsin Elections Commission
- 2026 Wisconsin elections
  - 2026 Wisconsin gubernatorial election
  - 2026 Wisconsin State Assembly election
- 2026 United States elections
- Elections in Wisconsin
- Wisconsin State Senate
