= Nic Cravillion =

American politician

Member-elect of the Wisconsin Senate from the 1st district
- Senator-elect
- Assuming office January 4, 2027
- Succeeding: André Jacque

Personal details
- Born: Nicolas William Cravillion; December 1991 (age 34) Green Bay, Wisconsin, U.S.
- Party: Republican
- Spouse: Caitlin C. Malott
- Children: 2
- Education: Northeast Wisconsin Technical College; University of Wisconsin–Green Bay (B.S.)
- Occupation: legislative staffer

Military service
- Allegiance: United States
- Branch/service: United States Army; U.S. Army Reserve; Wisconsin National Guard
- Years of service: 2011–2015 (USA); 2015–2019 (USAR); 2019–present (ARNG)
- Unit: 127th Infantry Regiment
- Battles/wars: Operation Enduring Freedom

Nicolas William "Nic" Cravillion (born December 1991) is an American small business owner and Republican politician from Brown County, Wisconsin. He is a member-elect of the Wisconsin Senate, and will represent Wisconsin's 1st Senate district in the 108th Wisconsin Legislature (2027–2028). He previously worked as district director for his predecessor in this state Senate seat, André Jacque, and before that he served in a similar capacity for state senator Roger Roth.

== Early life and career ==
Nic Cravillion was born and raised on his family's dairy farm in the town of Green Bay, Wisconsin, in the area of the unincorporated community New Franken, Wisconsin. He graduated from Luxemburg-Casco High School in 2010.

After high school, Cravillion enlisted in the United States Army. In 2014, he deployed to Afghanistan as an infantryman, supporting Operation Enduring Freedom. After the conclusion of his active duty service, Cravillion has continued his service with the Army Reserve and the Wisconsin National Guard, working as a drill instructor. In his reserve capacity, he deployed for relief operations following Hurricane Irma and various emergency response operations in Wisconsin.

After Cravillion transitioned from active to reserve status, he attended Northeast Wisconsin Technical College, then continued his education at the University of Wisconsin–Green Bay. He earned his bachelor's degree in 2018, majoring in public administration, political science, democracy and justice studies.

== Political career ==
In 2019, Cravillion was employed as a district outreach representative on the legislative staff of Republican state senator Roger Roth. After two years with Roth, he was hired by his home district state senator, Republican André Jacque, as district director.

While serving Jacque, in 2023, Cravillion also started a small business, North American Wagonmaster LLC, an event management business focused on organizing and supporting the annual Dutchmen RV Owners Rally in Indiana.

In April 2026, Jacque announced that he would not run for re-election, and would retire at the end of the 107th Legislature. Cravillion announced in May that he would run to succeed his former boss as representative of Wisconsin's 1st Senate district. The 1st Senate district comprises the northeast corner of Wisconsin, including the Door Peninsula, most of Calumet County, rural eastern and southern Brown County, and parts of Outagamie and Manitowoc counties.

Cravillion was the fourth candidate to enter the race for the Republican nomination, and faced a challenging primary that also included Katie Baney, a former congressional staffer for U.S. representative Paul Ryan and U.S. senator Ron Johnson. The other Republican candidates included dairy farmer Barbara Bittner and combat veteran Jacob VandenPlas. Cravillion won the primary with 41% of the vote and went on to a general election against independent candidate Mark Becker. Cravillion prevailed in the general election with about 58% of the vote, and is set to take office in January 2027.

== Personal life and family ==
Cravillion's ancestors purchased their homestead in 1854; he is the seventh generation of his family to reside on the family farm, although they no longer operate the farm as a business. Cravillion is a practicing Catholic.

Nic Cravillion married Caitlin C. Malott, a local realtor; they met in high school. They still reside on his family farm and have two school-age children.

== Electoral history ==
=== Wisconsin Senate (2026) ===
Wisconsin Senate, 1st District Election, 2026
Party	Candidate	Votes	%	±%
Republican Primary, August 11, 2026
Republican	Nic Cravillion	9,264	40.69%	
Republican	Barbara Bittner	5,727	25.15%	
Republican	Katie Baney	4,915	21.59%	
Republican	Jacob VandenPlas	2,848	12.51%	
	Scattering	14	0.06%	
Plurality		3,537	15.53%	
Total votes		22,768	100.0%	
General Election, November 3, 2026 (unofficial results)
Republican	Nic Cravillion	49,821	57.96%	−1.57pp
Independent	Mark Becker	36,141	42.04%	
Plurality		13,680	15.91%	−3.14pp
Total votes		85,962	100.0%	−1.61%
Republican hold				
