= Wisconsin's 45th Assembly district =

American legislative district in southern Wisconsin

Wisconsin's 45th State Assembly district
- 2024 map defined in 2023 Wisc. Act 94; 2022 map defined in Johnson v. Wisconsin Elections Commission; 2011 map was defined in 2011 Wisc. Act 43
Assemblymember
Clinton Anderson; D–Beloit
since January 3, 2023 (3 years)
- Demographics: 72.86% White; 10.52% Black; 12.48% Hispanic; 1.71% Asian; 2.5% Native American; 0.1% Hawaiian/Pacific Islander
- Population (2020) • Voting age: 59,601; 45,390
- Website: Official website
- Notes: Southern Wisconsin

The 45th Assembly district of Wisconsin is one of 99 districts in the Wisconsin State Assembly. Located in southern Wisconsin, the district comprises most of southern and eastern Rock County. It includes the cities of Beloit and Evansville, and the village of Orfordville. The district also contains Beloit College. The district is represented by Democrat Clinton Anderson, since January 2023.

The 45th Assembly district is located within Wisconsin's 15th Senate district, along with the 43rd and 44th Assembly districts.

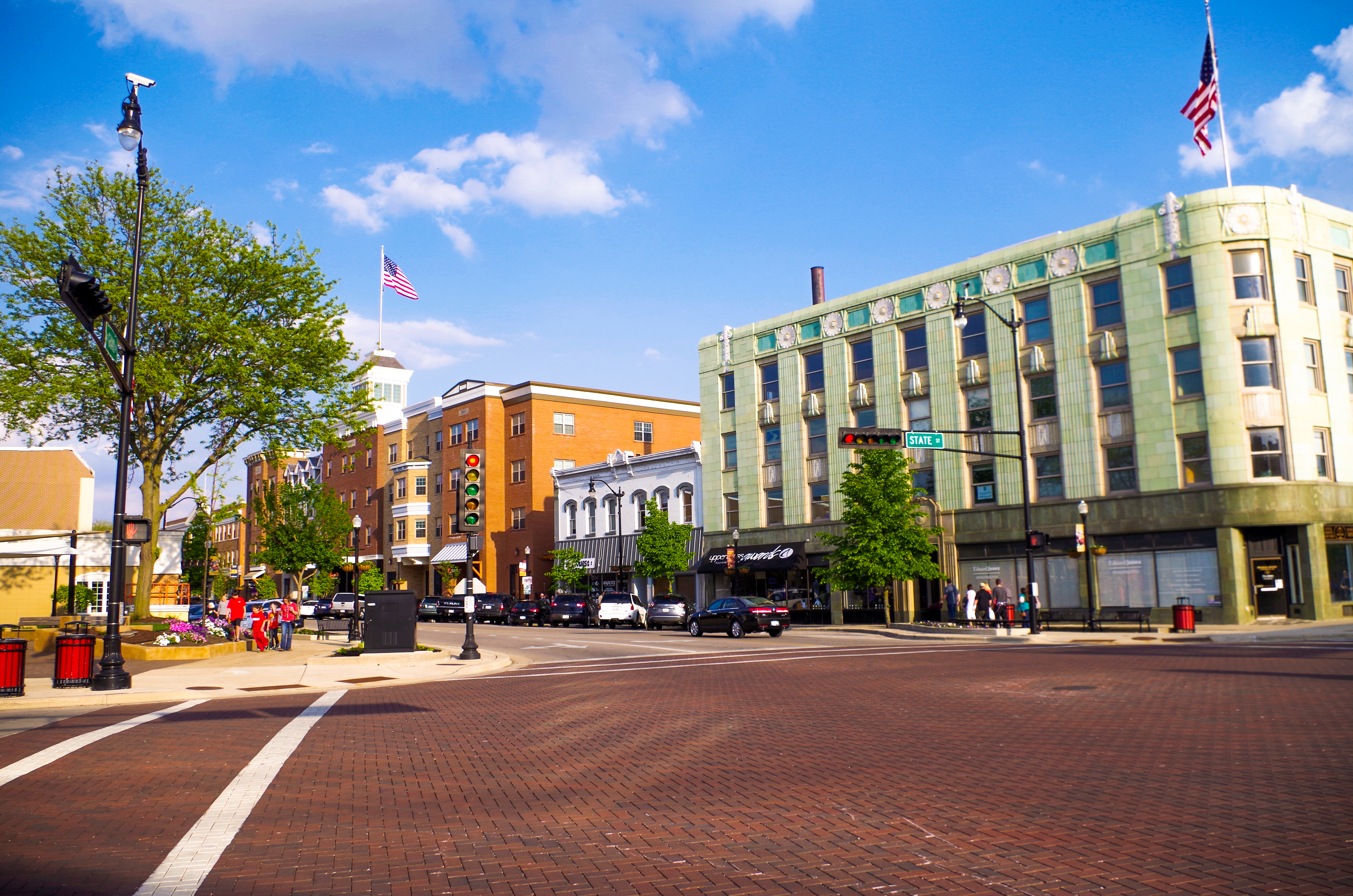
Downtown Beloit

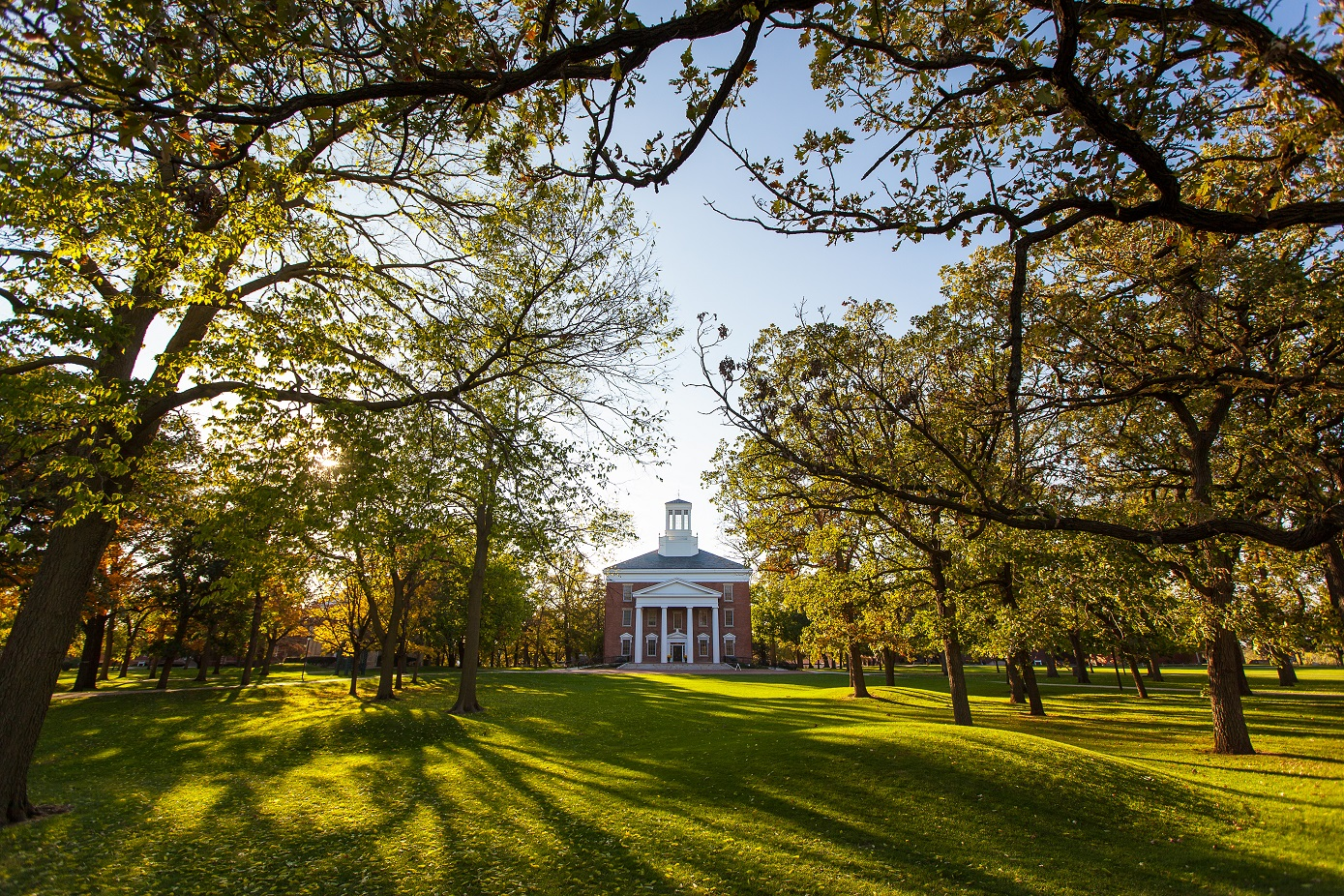
Middle College, part of Beloit College

== List of past representatives ==
List of representatives to the Wisconsin State Assembly from the 45th district
Member	Party	Residence	Counties represented	Term start	Term end	Ref.
District created
Gary K. Johnson	Dem.	Beloit	Rock	January 1, 1973	January 3, 1983	
Robert Quackenbush	Rep.	Sparta	Jackson, La Crosse, Monroe	January 3, 1983	January 7, 1985	
Timothy Weeden	Rep.	Beloit	Rock	January 7, 1985	April 21, 1987	
--Vacant--			Rock	April 21, 1987	June 17, 1987	
Judy Robson	Dem.	Beloit	Rock	June 17, 1987	January 4, 1999	
Dan Schooff	Dem.	Beloit	Rock, Walworth	January 4, 1999	January 3, 2005	
Chuck Benedict	Dem.	Beloit	Rock, Walworth	January 3, 2005	January 3, 2011	
Amy Loudenbeck	Rep.	Clinton	Rock, Walworth	January 3, 2011	January 7, 2013	
Janis Ringhand	Dem.	Evansville	Green, Rock	January 7, 2013	January 3, 2015	
Mark Spreitzer	Dem.	Beloit	Green, Rock	January 3, 2015	January 2, 2023	
Clinton Anderson	Dem.	Beloit	Green, Rock	January 3, 2023	Current	

== Electoral history ==
Year	Date	Elected				Defeated				Total	Plurality	Other primary candidates
2014	Nov. 4	Mark Spreitzer	Democratic	12,856	99.02%	--unopposed--				12,983	12,729	Sheila De Forest (Dem.)
2016	Nov. 8	Mark Spreitzer (inc)	Democratic	17,867	98.00%	--unopposed--				18,231	17,503	
2018	Nov. 7	Mark Spreitzer (inc)	Democratic	14,198	79.10%	Reese Wood	Lib.	3,496	19.48%	17,950	10,702	
2020	Nov. 3	Mark Spreitzer (inc)	Democratic	14,451	54.80%	Tawny Gustina	Rep.	11,895	45.11%	26,370	2,556	
2022	Nov. 8	Clinton Anderson	Democratic	11,636	55.75%	Jeff Klett	Rep.	9,221	44.18%	20,872	2,415	Ben Dorscheid (Dem.)
2024	Nov. 5	Clinton Anderson (inc)	Democratic	19,864	95.87%	--unopposed--				20,719	19,009	
