= Wisconsin's 43rd Assembly district =

American legislative district in southern Wisconsin

Wisconsin's 43rd State Assembly district
- 2024 map defined in 2023 Wisc. Act 94; 2022 map defined in Johnson v. Wisconsin Elections Commission; 2011 map was defined in 2011 Wisc. Act 43
Assemblymember
Brienne Brown; D–Whitewater
since January 6, 2025 (1 years)
- Demographics: 88.12% White; 2.31% Black; 5.9% Hispanic; 1.78% Asian; 1.34% Native American; 0.12% Hawaiian/Pacific Islander
- Population (2020) • Voting age: 59,228; 47,534
- Website: Official website
- Notes: Southern Wisconsin

The 43rd Assembly district of Wisconsin is one of 99 districts in the Wisconsin State Assembly. Located in southern Wisconsin, the district comprises northeast Rock County and parts of northwest Walworth County and southern Jefferson County. It includes the cities of Whitewater, Edgerton, and Milton, and part of the city of Janesville. The district also contains the University of Wisconsin–Whitewater campus. The district is represented by Democrat Brienne Brown, since January 2025.

The 43rd Assembly district is located within Wisconsin's 15th Senate district, along with the 44th and 45th Assembly districts.

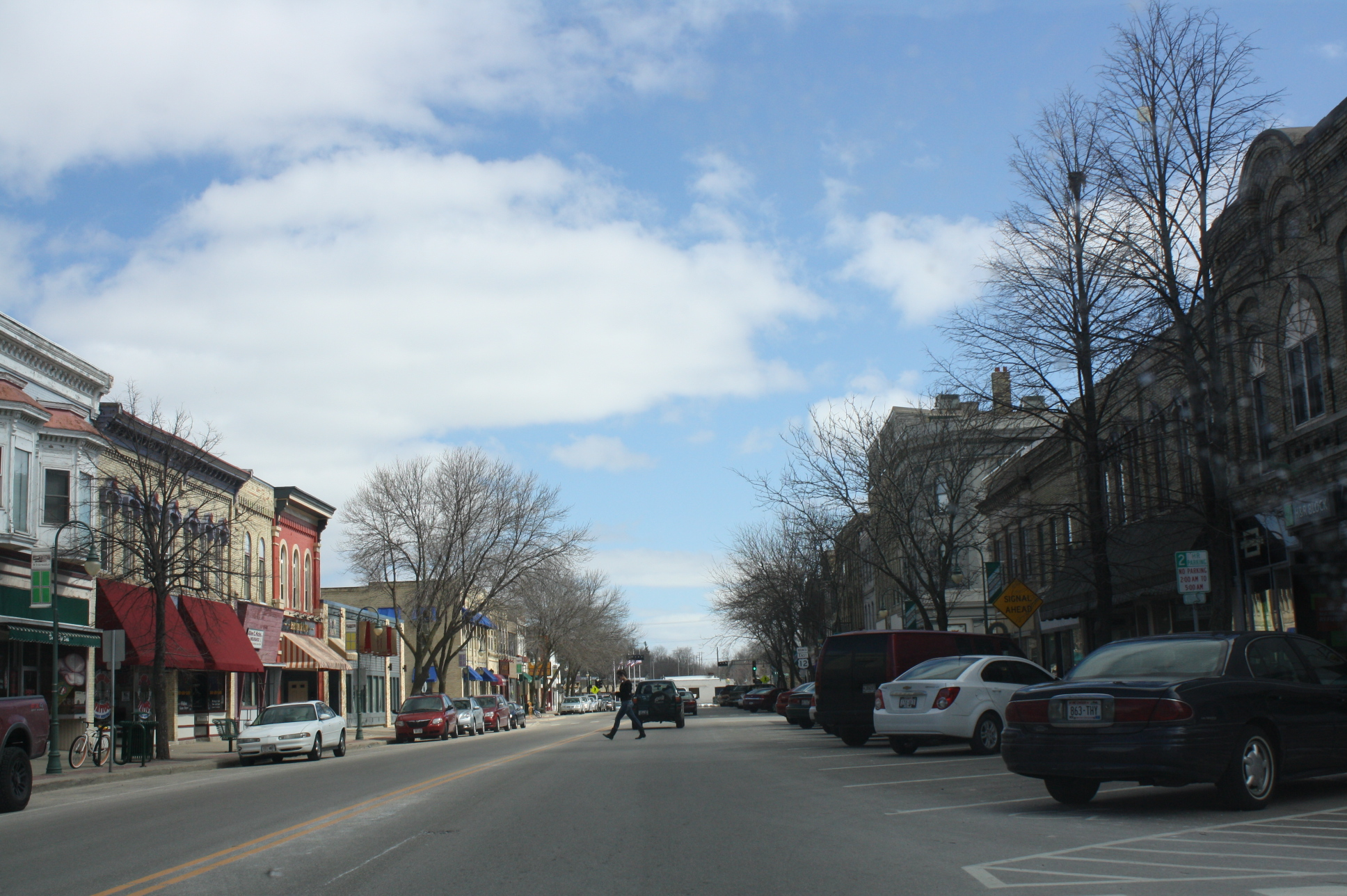
Main Street in downtown Whitewater

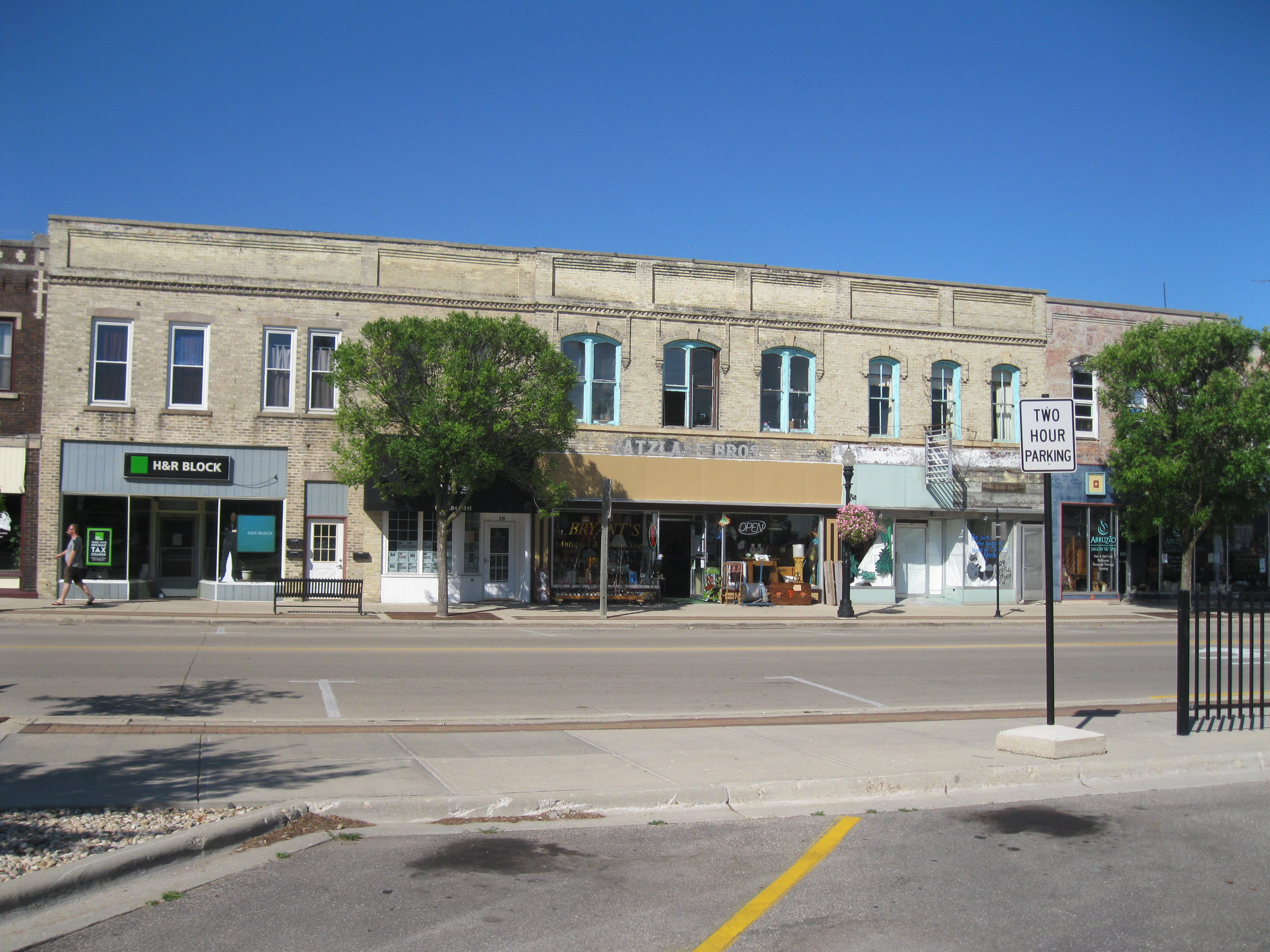
Fulton Street Historic District in Edgerton

== List of past representatives ==
List of representatives to the Wisconsin State Assembly from the 43rd district
Member	Party	Residence	Counties represented	Term start	Term end	Ref.
District created
Cloyd A. Porter	Rep.	Burlington	Racine, Walworth	January 1, 1973	January 3, 1983	
Barbara Gronemus	Dem.	Whitehall	Buffalo, Pepin, Trempealeau	January 3, 1983	January 7, 1985	
Charles W. Coleman	Rep.	Richmond	Walworth	January 7, 1985	January 6, 1997	
Neal Kedzie	Rep.	La Grange	Rock, Walworth	January 6, 1997	January 6, 2003	
Debi Towns	Rep.	Janesville	Rock, Walworth	January 6, 2003	January 1, 2007	
Kim Hixson	Dem.	Whitewater	Rock, Walworth	January 1, 2007	January 3, 2011	
Evan Wynn	Rep.	Whitewater	Rock, Walworth	January 3, 2011	January 7, 2013	
Andy Jorgensen	Dem.	Milton	Dane, Jefferson, Rock, Walworth	January 7, 2013	January 3, 2017	
Don Vruwink	Dem.	Milton	Dane, Jefferson, Rock, Walworth	January 3, 2017	January 2, 2023	
Jenna Jacobson	Dem.	Oregon	Dane, Rock	January 3, 2023	January 6, 2025	
Brienne Brown	Dem.	Whitewater	Jefferson, Rock, Walworth	January 6, 2025	Current	
