= Stephen Nass =

American politician (born 1952)

Stephen L. Nass

Member of the Wisconsin Senate from the 11th district
- Incumbent
- Assumed office January 3, 2015
- Preceded by: Neal Kedzie

Member of the Wisconsin State Assembly
- In office January 7, 2013 – January 3, 2015
- Preceded by: Chris Kapenga
- Succeeded by: Cody Horlacher
- Constituency: 33rd district
- In office January 4, 1993 – January 7, 2013
- Preceded by: Daniel P. Vrakas
- Succeeded by: Amy Loudenbeck
- Constituency: 31st district
- In office January 7, 1991 – January 4, 1993
- Preceded by: Margaret S. Lewis
- Succeeded by: Steven Foti
- Constituency: 38th district

Personal details
- Born: October 7, 1952 (age 73) Whitewater, Wisconsin, U.S.
- Party: Republican
- Education: University of Wisconsin–Whitewater (BS, MSEd)
- Profession: Politician
- Website: Official website; Campaign website

Military service
- Allegiance: United States
- Branch/service: Wisconsin Air National Guard
- Years of service: 1972–2005
- Rank: Chief Master Sergeant, ANG
- Unit: 128th Air Refueling Wing
- Battles/wars: Gulf War

Stephen Leonard Nass (born October 7, 1952) is an American Republican politician from Whitewater, Wisconsin. He is a member of the Wisconsin Senate, representing the 11th Senate district since 2015; he has announced he will not run for re-election in 2026 and his term will expire on January 4, 2027. He previously served 24 years in the Wisconsin State Assembly, from 1991 to 2015, and served on the Whitewater city council from 1977 to 1981.

== Early life and career ==
Nass was born in Whitewater, Wisconsin, on October 7, 1952. He was raised in Whitewater and has resided there for most of his life; he graduated from Whitewater High School in 1971. After working for a time, he resumed his education, attending the University of Wisconsin–Whitewater and earning his bachelor's degree in 1978.

After college, Nass worked nearly a decade for the Wisconsin Association of School Boards as an information analyst, during which time he often served as an advisor to local school boards on negotiations with state teachers unions. In the late 1980s, he was hired as a payroll benefits analyst for the Wisconsin Department of Health and Social Services.

While employed in those roles, he continued his education at UW–Whitewater and earned a M.S.Ed. in school business management in 1990.

Nass enlisted with the Wisconsin Air National Guard after high school and ultimately served 33 years with the 128th Air Refueling Wing. He volunteered for active duty in 1990 and served in the Persian Gulf region during Operation Desert Shield, serving two months in Saudi Arabia. His unit was later activated for service in Operation Desert Storm and deployed to Egypt. Later in the 1990s, he served additional deployments in support of the no-fly zones in Iraq and Bosnia. He retired as a chief master sergeant about 2005.

== Political career ==
=== Early offices and Assembly (1977–2014) ===
Nass began his political career while attending UW–Whitewater in 1977, when he was elected to an open seat on the Whitewater city council. He served four years on the city council, from 1977 to 1981; during that time he was also appointed to the UW–Whitewater board of visitors, serving from 1979 to 1989.

He made his first bid for state office in 1990, running as a Republican for Wisconsin State Assembly in the 38th district seat being vacated by the retirement of representative Margaret S. Lewis. The 38th district at the time was anchored on Nass' home city, Whitewater, and stretched north to the municipalities of Jefferson and Johnson Creek, and west to include northeast wards of the city of Janesville. Nass faced a primary against political newcomer Jacquelin J. Wood, but prevailed with 60% of the vote. In the general election, his Democratic opponent was perennial candidate William Edington, a band teacher from Johnson Creek; an independent candidate, Wayne Harter, also ran. Nass prevailed with 52.6% of the vote and was sworn in as a state representative in January 1991.

In 1992, Wisconsin underwent a significant legislative redistricting. The plan was enacted by a panel of federal judges, due to the state government's inability to come to a compromise on a redistricting plan for the 1990 census. Nass' district was renumbered as the 31st district; it remained anchored on Whitewater, but shifted away from Janesville and into southwest Waukesha County. In the new district configuration, he was re-elected five times receiving more than 60% of the vote in each race.

Another federal court redistricting in 2002 again significantly reshaped Nass' district. This time the old district population centers—Whitewater and Jefferson—were removed from the district as it shifted into Oconomowoc in the northeast and Elkhorn in the south. By then, Nass had moved his voting address to the village of Palmyra, Wisconsin, just east of Whitewater, and therefore remained in the new district. The new district configuration was even more safely Republican, Nass was re-elected five more times in that configuration, never receiving less than 63% of the vote.

In 2010, Nass said he would introduce legislation banning pavement markers designed to minimize conflicts between bicyclists and motorists. Nass accused "liberal extremists in Madison who hate cars and think everyone should bike to work" with "basically making it difficult to use an automobile." Nass's position drew a caustic response from Madison mayor Dave Cieslewicz, who noted that Madison is 70 miles from the district that Nass represents. "Not having been able to solve a single significant state problem (which they actually got elected to do) in their combined 37 years in office these guys now want to micromanage the city of Madison. There's a way they can do that, of course. They can give up their seats in the Legislature and run for the Madison City Council."

=== State Senate (2014–2027) ===
In May 2014, state senator Neal Kedzie announced that he would not run for re-election in 2014, and Nass quickly entered the race to succeed him in the 11th state Senate district. The 11th Senate district under the 2011 gerrymander comprised all of Walworth County, the eastern half of Rock County, southwestern Waukesha County, and parts of southeastern and central Jefferson County; it was a safe Republican seat. Nass faced no opposition for the Republican nomination and went on to the 2014 general election against Democratic candidate Daniel Kilkenny, a county supervisor from Walworth County. Nass easily won the 2014 general election, receiving 63% of the vote.

Since joining the Wisconsin Senate in January 2015, Nass has been described as one of the chamber's most conservative members. He was re-elected without opposition in 2018.

In 2022, his district was redrawn by the Wisconsin Supreme Court redistricting plan, Waukesha County was removed from his district, and more of southern Jefferson County was added, the district remained safely Republican. In the 2022 general election, Nass faced retired educator Steven J. Doelder. This was Nass's closest election since 1990, but he still prevailed with 58% of the vote.

=== Conflict with the University of Wisconsin ===
In both the Assembly and Senate, Nass has had a bitter and adversarial relationship with the University of Wisconsin System, which he has accused of "liberal indoctrination." His opinion of the University took on greater significance in the 2007–2008 and 2011–2012 legislative terms, when Nass was chair of the Assembly's Colleges and Universities Committee.

In 2007, Nass worked to cut funds for specific University of Wisconsin programs that he disagreed with philosophically, including the Havens Wright Center for Social Justice in UW–Madison's sociology department and the UW–Extension School For Workers, saying that they are "too far to the left." Paul Soglin, the mayor of Madison, Wisconsin, responded by calling Nass "the outlaw chairman of an Assembly committee that is designed to destroy the University of Wisconsin System."

Nass's feud with the University continued into his time in the state Senate, where he served on the Senate Committee on Universities and Technical Colleges. In 2017, Nass accused UW of waging a "war on men" with an initiative about masculinity, and criticized a course offered by UW on white privilege.

=== Other political positions ===
Nass is a supporter of Donald Trump. In 2017, Wisconsin taxpayers paid $966 to send Nass to Trump's first speech to a joint session of Congress, and in 2019, during the Trump's first impeachment, he accused Trump's enemies of "vile efforts to effectuate a political coup of the president." Nass has sponsored legislation to declare English the official language of Wisconsin.

During the COVID-19 pandemic, Nass criticized public health measures put into place by Democratic governor Tony Evers, and in April 2020, Nass accused the state health secretary, Andrea Palm, of promoting "excessive levels of fear." In July 2020, after Evers issued an order requiring the wearing of face coverings in public indoor spaces to prevent the spread of the virus, Nass called the order "illegal and unnecessary" and urged the state legislature to convene an emergency session to repeal the order. During the pandemic, Nass supported the termination of Evers' emergency declarations. He also pushed to require state workers to return to physical offices, revoke funding for schools that did not hold in-person classes, restrict the power of state and local health agencies, and expand school choice programs. He introduced legislation to block the University of Wisconsin from instituting COVID-19 testing, masking and vaccination protocols on its campuses across the state.

In 2025 Nass voted against the 2025–2027 state budget, which had been created through negotiations between governor Evers, Senate Republicans, and Senate Democrats, describing it as the "Vos-Evers orgy of spending".

=== Retirement ===
In February 2026, Nass announced he would not run for re-election in the 2026 election, and would retire at the end of the 107th Wisconsin Legislature.

== Personal life and family ==
Stephen Nass is one of four children born to Wilfred Nass Sr. and his wife Joyce (née Sherman). Wilfred Nass was a longtime police officer in Whitewater; the Nass family were descendants of Friedrich Nass who settled in Walworth County, Wisconsin, in the 1880s, after emigrating from the Pomerania region of the German Empire.

Stephen Nass has never been married, but has been in a long term relationship with Sheila Reiff. Reiff is also a prominent Republican in Walworth County, serving several years as county clerk and as a member of the county board.

== Electoral history ==
=== Wisconsin Assembly, 38th district (1990) ===
| Year | Election | Date | Elected | | | | Defeated | | | | Total | Plurality |
|---|---|---|---|---|---|---|---|---|---|---|---|---|
| 1990 | Primary | Sep. 11 | Stephen L. Nass | Republican | 2,034 | 60.20% | Jacquelin J. Wood | Rep. | 1,345 | 39.80% | 3,379 | 689 |
| 1990 | General | Nov. 6 | Stephen L. Nass | Republican | 7,393 | 52.56% | William P. Edington | Dem. | 6,448 | 45.84% | 14,066 | 945 |
| 1990 | General | Nov. 6 | Stephen L. Nass | Republican | 7,393 | 52.56% | Wayne E. Harter | Ind. | 225 | 1.60% | 14,066 | 945 |

=== Wisconsin Assembly, 31st district (1992–2010) ===
| Year | Election | Date | Elected | | | | Defeated | | | | Total | Plurality |
|---|---|---|---|---|---|---|---|---|---|---|---|---|
| 1992 | General | Nov. 3 | Stephen L. Nass | Republican | 14,294 | 61.06% | Shirley M. Wheeler | Dem. | 9,117 | 38.94% | 23,411 | 5,177 |
| 1994 | General | Nov. 8 | Stephen L. Nass (inc) | Republican | 10,265 | 69.26% | Shirley M. Wheeler | Dem. | 4,557 | 30.74% | 14,822 | 5,708 |
| 1996 | General | Nov. 5 | Stephen L. Nass (inc) | Republican | 14,214 | 61.55% | Shirley M. Wheeler | Dem. | 8,226 | 35.62% | 23,092 | 5,988 |
| 1996 | General | Nov. 5 | Stephen L. Nass (inc) | Republican | 14,214 | 61.55% | Edward J. Frami | Tax. | 652 | 2.82% | 23,092 | 5,988 |
| 1998 | General | Nov. 3 | Stephen L. Nass (inc) | Republican | 11,620 | 64.85% | Shirley M. Wheeler | Dem. | 6,299 | 35.15% | 17,919 | 5,321 |
| 2000 | General | Nov. 7 | Stephen L. Nass (inc) | Republican | 20,589 | 86.79% | Bernard T. Dalsey | Dem. | 3,103 | 13.08% | 23,723 | 17,486 |
| 2002 | General | Nov. 5 | Stephen L. Nass (inc) | Republican | 13,883 | 86.78% | Leroy L. Watson | Dem. | 2,091 | 13.07% | 15,998 | 11,792 |
| 2004 | General | Nov. 2 | Stephen L. Nass (inc) | Republican | 20,934 | 66.06% | Scott Woods | Dem. | 10,041 | 31.68% | 31,691 | 10,893 |
| 2004 | General | Nov. 2 | Stephen L. Nass (inc) | Republican | 20,934 | 66.06% | Bruce Hinkforth | Grn. | 696 | 2.20% | 31,691 | 10,893 |
| 2006 | General | Nov. 7 | Stephen L. Nass (inc) | Republican | 15,494 | 63.99% | Scott A. Woods | Dem. | 8,129 | 33.57% | 24,212 | 7,365 |
| 2006 | General | Nov. 7 | Stephen L. Nass (inc) | Republican | 15,494 | 63.99% | Ben Bourdo | Ind. | 579 | 2.39% | 24,212 | 7,365 |
| 2008 | General | Nov. 4 | Stephen L. Nass (inc) | Republican | 21,780 | 66.66% | Frank E. Urban | Dem. | 10,853 | 33.22% | 32,671 | 10,927 |
| 2010 | Primary | Sep. 14 | Stephen L. Nass (inc) | Republican | 7,463 | 74.99% | Craig Peterson | Rep. | 2,480 | 24.92% | 9,952 | 4,983 |
| 2010 | General | Nov. 2 | Stephen L. Nass (inc) | Republican | 20,193 | 89.29% | Leroy L. Watson | Lib. | 2,378 | 10.52% | 22,614 | 17,815 |

=== Wisconsin Assembly, 33rd district (2012) ===
| Year | Election | Date | Elected | | | | Defeated | | | | Total | Plurality |
|---|---|---|---|---|---|---|---|---|---|---|---|---|
| 2012 | General | Nov. 6 | Stephen L. Nass | Republican | 18,891 | 62.79% | Scott A. Woods | Dem. | 10,229 | 34.00% | 30,087 | 8,662 |
| 2012 | General | Nov. 6 | Stephen L. Nass | Republican | 18,891 | 62.79% | Terry Virgil | Ind. | 945 | 3.14% | 30,087 | 8,662 |

=== Wisconsin Senate (2014–2022) ===
| Year | Election | Date | Elected | | | | Defeated | | | | Total | Plurality |
|---|---|---|---|---|---|---|---|---|---|---|---|---|
| 2014 | General | Nov. 4 | Stephen L. Nass | Republican | 43,842 | 63.29% | Dan Kilkenny | Dem. | 25,377 | 36.63% | 69,271 | 18,465 |
| 2018 | General | Nov. 6 | Stephen L. Nass (inc) | Republican | 59,512 | 95.89% | Steve M. Johnson (write-in) | Ind. | 53 | 0.09% | 62,066 | 57,011 |
| 2022 | General | Nov. 8 | Stephen L. Nass (inc) | Republican | 44,974 | 58.31% | Steven J. Doelder | Dem. | 32,087 | 41.60% | 77,123 | 12,887 |

Wisconsin State Assembly
| Preceded by Margaret S. Lewis | Member of the Wisconsin State Assembly from the 38th district January 7, 1991 – January 4, 1993 | Succeeded by Steven Foti |
| Preceded by Daniel P. Vrakas | Member of the Wisconsin State Assembly from the 31st district January 4, 1993 – January 7, 2013 | Succeeded by Amy Loudenbeck |
| Preceded by Chris Kapenga | Member of the Wisconsin State Assembly from the 33rd district January 7, 2013 – January 3, 2015 | Succeeded by Cody Horlacher |
Wisconsin Senate
| Preceded by Neal Kedzie | Member of the Wisconsin Senate from the 11th district January 3, 2015 – present | Incumbent |
