= Janis Ringhand =

21st century American politician (born 1950)

Member of the Wisconsin Senate from the 15th district
- In office January 5, 2015 – January 2, 2023
- Preceded by: Timothy Cullen
- Succeeded by: Mark Spreitzer

Member of the Wisconsin State Assembly
- In office January 7, 2013 – January 5, 2015
- Preceded by: Amy Loudenbeck
- Succeeded by: Mark Spreitzer
- Constituency: 45th district
- In office January 3, 2011 – January 7, 2013
- Preceded by: Brett Davis
- Succeeded by: Sondy Pope-Roberts
- Constituency: 80th district

Member of the Board of Supervisors of Rock County, Wisconsin, from the 1st district
- Incumbent
- Assumed office April 2024
- Preceded by: Mary Beaver

Mayor of Evansville, Wisconsin
- In office 2002–2006

Personal details
- Born: February 13, 1950 (age 76) Madison, Wisconsin, U.S.
- Party: Democratic
- Spouse: Gordon
- Education: Madison Area Technical College
- Profession: Accountant, politician

Janis Ringhand (born February 13, 1950) is an American accountant and Democratic politician from Rock County, Wisconsin. She is a member of the Rock County board of supervisors, since 2024. She previously represented Rock County for twelve years in the Wisconsin Legislature, serving eight years in the Wisconsin Senate (2015–2023) and four years in the Wisconsin State Assembly (2011–2015). Prior to serving in the legislature, she was mayor of Evansville, Wisconsin, from 2002 to 2006.

== Biography ==
Ringhand graduated from Madison Area Technical College in 1985, and served as the mayor of Evansville from 2002 to 2006. A Democrat, Ringhand was elected to the Assembly in 2010, unseating Republican incumbent Amy Loudenbeck, and re-elected in 2012.

In 2014, with the announced retirement of state senator Tim Cullen, Ringhand ran for Cullen's seat rather than seek re-election to the Assembly. She won the Democratic primary election in August, with 6,157 votes to 5,883 for former Cullen aide Austin Scieszinski and 3,448 for former Assembly Speaker Michael J. Sheridan. On November 4, 2014, Ringhand was elected to the Wisconsin State Senate.

Wisconsin State Assembly
Preceded by Brett Davis	Member of the Wisconsin State Assembly from the 80th district January 3, 2011 – January 7, 2013	Succeeded by Sondy Pope-Roberts
Preceded by Amy Loudenbeck	Member of the Wisconsin State Assembly from the 45th district January 7, 2013 – January 5, 2015	Succeeded by Mark Spreitzer
Wisconsin Senate
Preceded by Timothy Cullen	Member of the Wisconsin Senate from the 15th district January 5, 2015 – January 2, 2023	Succeeded by Mark Spreitzer
