= Vandenbroek, Wisconsin =

- Town
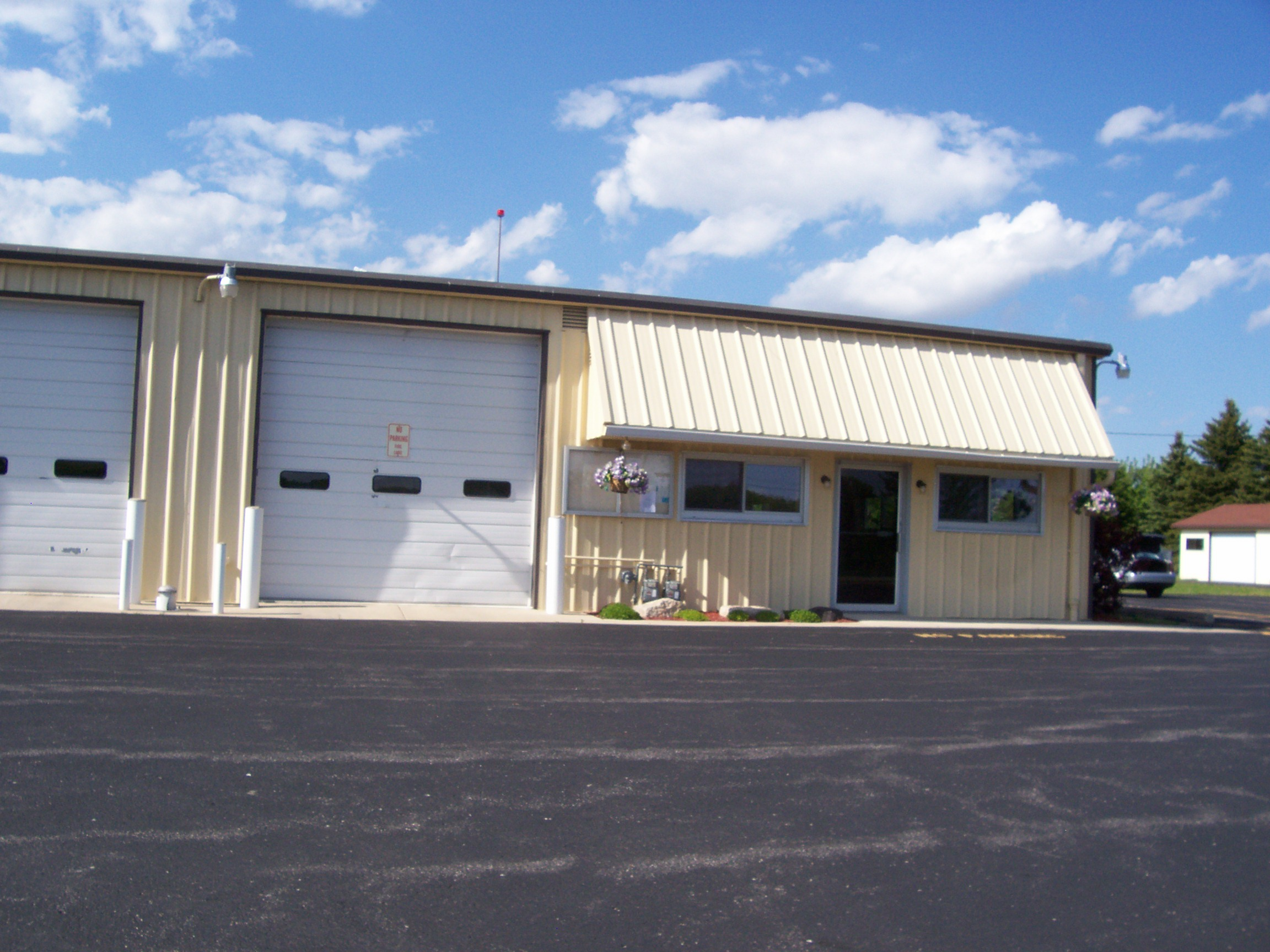
- Town hall

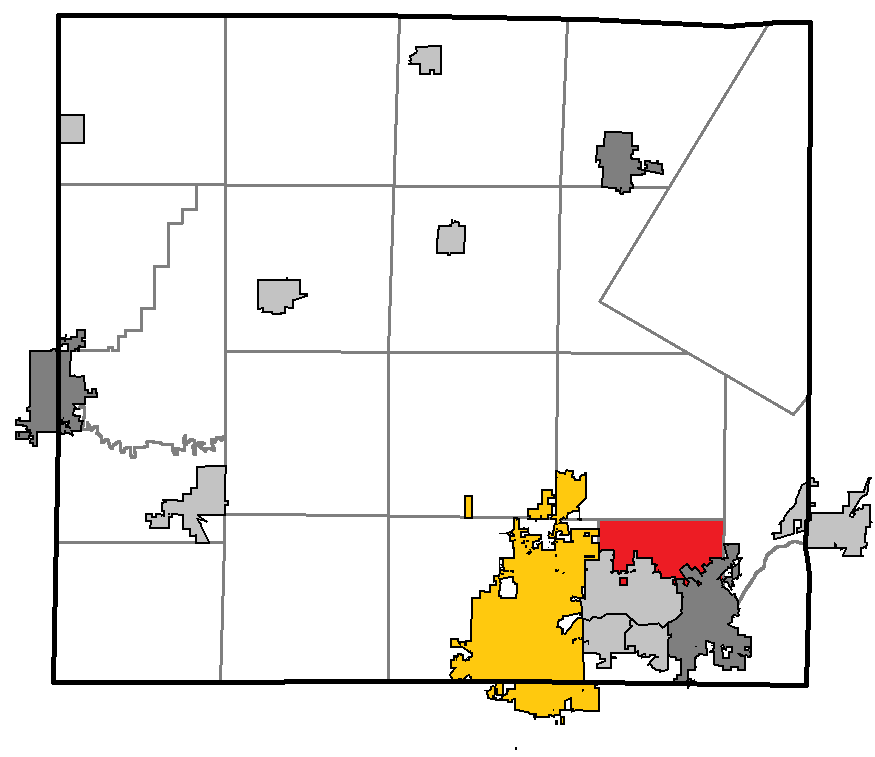
- Location of Vandenbroek, within Outagamie County
- Coordinates: 44°18′N 88°18′W
- Country: United States
- State: Wisconsin
- County: Outagamie

Area
  - Total: 9.5 sq mi (24.6 km^{2})
  - Land: 9.5 sq mi (24.6 km^{2})
  - Water: 0 sq mi (0.0 km^{2})
- Elevation: 719 ft (219 m)

Population (2020)
  - Total: 1,627
  - Density: 171/sq mi (66.1/km^{2})
- Time zone: UTC-6 (Central (CST))
  - Summer (DST): UTC-5 (CDT)
- Area code: 920
- FIPS code: 55-82400
- GNIS feature ID: 1584326
- Website: http://www.vandenbroekwi.gov

Vandenbroek is a town in Outagamie County, Wisconsin, United States. The population was 1,627 at the 2020 census.

== Geography ==
According to the United States Census Bureau, the town has a total area of 9.5 square miles (24.6 km^{2}), all land.

== Demographics ==
As of the census of 2020, there were 1,627 people, 592 households, and 467 families residing in the town. The population density was 171.26 people per square mile (55.0/km^{2}). There were 592 housing units at an average density of 62 per square mile (18.9/km^{2}). The racial makeup of the town was 96.44% White, 0.25% African American, 0.25% Native American, 0.63% Asian, and 2.0% from two or more races. Hispanic or Latino of any race were 0.5% of the population.

There were 592 households, out of which 40.0% had children under the age of 18 living with them. 79.6% of households were married couples, 5.6% single males, 4.3% single females. The average household size was 3.06 and the average family size was 3.22. The median home value was $268,300.

In the town, the population was spread out, with 31.9% under the age of 18, 3.9% from 18 to 24, 21.9% from 25 to 44, 30.9% from 45 to 64, and 11.9% who were 65 years of age or older. The median age was 39 years. For every 100 females, there were 93.2 males. For every 100 females age 18 and over, there were 108.7 males.

The median income for a household in the town was $97,500, with the median income for a family of $102,143. Males had a median income of $64,145 versus $49,,028 for females. The per capita income for the town was $23,419. About 1.3% of families and 2.3% of the population were below the poverty line, including 1.88% of those under age 18 and 1.06% of those age 65 or over.
