= Brett Davis =

American politician

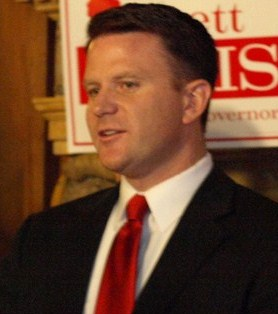
- Davis in 2010

Member of the Wisconsin State Assembly from the 80th district
- In office January 3, 2005 – January 3, 2011
- Preceded by: Mike Powers
- Succeeded by: Janis Ringhand

Personal details
- Born: December 5, 1975 (age 50) Monroe, Wisconsin, U.S.
- Party: Republican
- Spouse: Amy
- Children: 3
- Education: University of Wisconsin–Oshkosh
- Occupation: health insurance executive

Brett H. Davis (born December 5, 1975) is an American businessman and former Republican politician. He served three terms in the Wisconsin State Assembly, representing the 80th Assembly district, and subsequently served as Wisconsin's state Medicaid director from 2011 to 2014.

== Background ==
Davis was born in Monroe, Wisconsin, and received his degree in business administration from the University of Wisconsin–Oshkosh. He served as a legislative aide and Chief of Staff for State Senator Joe Leibham (R-WI) before working as an advisor to U.S. Secretary of Health and Human Services Tommy Thompson.

Davis represented the 80th Assembly District (2004–10). In private life he was a realtor during his terms in the Assembly.

On September 17, 2009, he announced that he was filing the paperwork for a potential run for Lieutenant Governor of Wisconsin. However the Republican nomination for Lieutenant Governor ultimately went to Rebecca Kleefisch. In January 2011, Davis was named Wisconsin's Medicaid Director, appointed by then Secretary Dennis Smith.

On March 12, 2014, Davis announced his resignation as the Medicaid Director for Wisconsin to take a job as the vice president of provider relations at WPS Health Insurance.

More recently, Davis became president and C.E.O. of Aspirus Arise Health Plan of Wisconsin, an insurance company.

== Personal life ==
As of 2010, Davis resided with his family in Oregon, Wisconsin, where he is a past president of the Oregon Area Chamber of Commerce.
