= WESTconsin Credit Union =

- Type: Credit Union
- Industry: Financial services
- Founded: 1939
- Headquarters: Menomonie, Wisconsin, United States
- Number of locations: 15
- Key people: Jim Wookey (CEO)
- Total assets: $2.1 billion (2025)
- Website: westconsincu.org

WESTconsin Credit Union is a not-for-profit financial cooperative that was founded as Menomonie Farmers Credit Union in 1939. WESTconsin is headquartered in Menomonie, Wisconsin. Currently, they have over 125,000 members and control more than $2 billion in assets, with 15 offices in the Wisconsin communities of Altoona, Amery, Baldwin, Barron, Chippewa Falls, Eau Claire, Ellsworth, Hudson, Menomonie, New Richmond, Prescott, Rice Lake, and River Falls. WESTconsin Credit Union has also gained notice for their high school offices, located in Amery, Baldwin-Woodville, Menomonie, and New Richmond.

== History ==
On December 5, 1938, Chris Hovland, William Millar, Jr., J.C. Martinson, Stewart L. Gevne, Edward Torgerson, Harold E. Martinson, and Gene Long signed Articles of Incorporation, applying for a charter for the Menomonie Farmers Credit Union. On January 12, 1939, the Articles of Incorporation of this credit union were approved and filed with the State Banking Department in Madison, Wisconsin. In 1949, the credit union hired Art Gilberts as its first full-time manager. He managed the credit union from his house until 1953. By 1953, the credit union had grown to $365,000 in assets and the Board of Directors decided the credit union should have its own office. Office space was rented one-half block off Main Street in downtown Menomonie.

With Menomonie Farmers Credit Union’s (MFCU) continued growth and success, other credit unions in the area turned to MFCU to merge for greater strength and to save credit union service in their communities. MFCU merged with smaller credit unions in the area over the next few years. River Falls merged in December 1974; Barron and Amery merged in January 1979; Baldwin merged in August 1979; and New Richmond merged in September 1984. A satellite office was opened on the UW-River Falls campus in September 1994 and a new office was opened in North Menomonie in 1995.

By December 1980, the credit union had assets of $29.9 million. In January 1981, long-time President Art Gilberts retired. Robert J. Wilson, who began his career with the credit union in 1954, succeeded Gilberts as President.

In 1990, members voted to change the name to WESTconsin Credit Union. This change was made to recognize the diversity of the membership and the various communities served throughout western Wisconsin. Another change in management occurred in 1993 when Robert J. Wilson retired as president. Greg Lentz was appointed by the Board of Directors to succeed Wilson as president.

The new century brought changes and expansion to WESTconsin. In 2001, the Menomonie–East office was constructed. In 2004, WESTconsin Realty, a full-service realty company, was created and an office in Hudson was opened. The Prescott office came in 2007. WESTconsin Title Services was created in the spring of 2012, to service western Wisconsin. WESTconsin opened an office in Eau Claire in 2012, and Ellsworth in 2014. Lora Benrud, who began working at WESTconsin Credit Union in 1984, became the fourth Chief Executive Officer in August 2014. New offices were opened in Chippewa Falls in 2015, and in Altoona in 2017. In 2018, membership hits over 100,000, and as WESTconsin Credit Union continued to grow, it was determined they needed more space and a new Administrative Center was built in 2019.

Due to the COVID-19 pandemic, WESTconsin saw many changes to their operations in 2020, including lobbies that were open by appointment only and employees working remotely for the first time. Throughout the year, WESTconsin was able to make multiple large contributions to area organizations, including $45,000 to food banks and $30,000 to domestic abuse shelters.

In summer of 2024, the Rice Lake office was built. Benrud retired in September 2024, and Jim Wookey, the chief operations officer since 2011, succeeded her as chief executive.

== Fundraising and Awards ==
CUNA Mutual Group, the credit unions movement’s primary insurance provider, presented WESTconsin Credit Union with the 2004 Roy F. Bergengren Award for High Achievement for WESTconsin's community focus, quality service to members, and involvement with the credit union system. WESTconsin is also named the 2004 Business of the Year by the Greater Menomonie Area Chamber of Commerce.

Youth financial education remains a top priority for WESTconsin. Since 2008, WESTconsin offices have been participating in local School Supply Drives benefitting students in need. Over $365,000 in scholarship funds have been awarded to local students since the program was launched in 1995. The WESTconsin Scholarship Program awards $500 scholarships to graduating seniors from communities served by our offices. Budget or Bust, a youth board game developed by employees, receives a Diamond Best of Show Award from CUNA in 2012.

In 2016, WESTconsin received the USDA Rural Development Award as the Platinum Million Dollar Lender. This award is presented each year to lenders who have partnered with and made significant contributions to supporting Wisconsin rural residents looking to become homeowners through the USDA Guaranteed Rural Housing (GRH) Program. In 2023, Forbes named WESTconsin the fourth-best credit union in the state, as well as a top small employer. The credit union’s financial education efforts were also recognized through winning the Alphonse Desjardins Awards from CUNA, named 1st place in Youth Financial Education and 2nd place in the Adult Financial Education categories for credit unions with $1B+ in assets in the state of Wisconsin. This same year, WESTconsin was also honored to be a recipient of the 2023 Governor’s Financial Literacy Award, recognizing efforts to help build financial literacy in Wisconsin.

WESTconsin was recognized in 2025 as a Debt Relief Advocate by GreenPath Financial Wellness, through its Partner Excellence Awards. This recognition showcases organizations that have referred the most individuals to GreenPath’s Debt Management Program, highlighting dedication to providing critical financial resources and guidance to members. In 2025, a milestone was hit while celebrating 15 years of The Mitten Tree campaign. Since its inception, The Mitten Tree has collected over 35,000 cold weather apparel items and raised $42,00 for local organizations.

== Membership ==
Membership is open to anyone who lives or works in the Wisconsin counties of Barron, Buffalo, Burnett, Chippewa, Clark, Dunn, Eau Claire, Jackson, Pepin, Pierce, Polk, Rusk, St. Croix, Sawyer, Taylor, Trempealeau, and Washburn, or the Minnesota counties of Anoka, Chisago, Dakota, Goodhue, Hennepin, Isanti, Pine, Ramsey, Scott, Wabasha, and Washington with a $5 deposit in a membership share (savings) account.

== High school offices ==
Presently, WESTconsin Credit Union has four fully operational high school offices that are located in Amery, Baldwin-Woodville, Menomonie, and New Richmond.
