= Margaret S. Lewis =

American politician (born 1954)

Margaret S. Lewis (born June 19, 1954) is a former member of the Wisconsin State Assembly.

== Biography ==
Lewis was born on June 19, 1954. She graduated from Homestead High School in Mequon, Wisconsin and the University of Wisconsin–Madison and is married with two children.

== Career ==
Lewis was first elected to the Assembly in 1984. She is a Republican.
