= Amy Loudenbeck =

American politician (born 1969)

Member of the Wisconsin State Assembly
- In office January 7, 2013 – January 2, 2023
- Preceded by: Stephen Nass
- Succeeded by: Ellen Schutt
- Constituency: 31st Assembly district
- In office January 3, 2011 – January 7, 2013
- Preceded by: Chuck Benedict
- Succeeded by: Janis Ringhand
- Constituency: 45th Assembly district

Personal details
- Born: September 29, 1969 (age 56) Midland, Michigan, U.S.
- Party: Republican
- Spouse: Matt
- Education: University of Wisconsin, Madison (BA)

Amy Lynn Loudenbeck (born September 29, 1969) is an American Republican politician from Rock County, Wisconsin. She served 12 years in the Wisconsin State Assembly, from 2011 to 2023. Since leaving office, she has worked as policy director for the nonprofit School Choice Wisconsin.

== Biography ==
Amy Loudenbeck was born in Midland, Michigan, in 1969. She was raised in the Detroit and Chicago areas, and graduated from Hinsdale Central High School, in Hinsdale, Illinois. She went on to attend the University of Wisconsin–Madison, where she earned her bachelor's degree in international relations in 1991.

She was elected to the Wisconsin State Assembly in 2010 as a Republican from the 45th district. (Democratic incumbent Chuck Benedict did not seek re-election.)

She was a candidate in the 2022 Wisconsin Secretary of State Election, calling for the Wisconsin Elections Commission to be dismantled and power over elections returned to the Secretary of State. She lost by a margin of 7,400 votes to incumbent Doug La Follette.

== Electoral history ==
=== Wisconsin Assembly, 45th district (2010) ===
| Year | Election | Date | Elected | | | | Defeated | | | | Total | Plurality |
|---|---|---|---|---|---|---|---|---|---|---|---|---|
| 2010 | Primary | Sep. 14 | Amy Loudenbeck | Republican | 1,647 | 40.80% | Jeff Klett | Rep. | 1,632 | 40.43% | 4,037 | 15 |
| 2010 | Primary | Sep. 14 | Amy Loudenbeck | Republican | 1,647 | 40.80% | Jim Reseburg | Rep. | 756 | 18.73% | 4,037 | 15 |
| 2010 | General | Nov. 2 | Amy Loudenbeck | Republican | 9,440 | 54.36% | Roger Anclam | Dem. | 7,921 | 45.61% | 17,367 | 1,519 |

=== Wisconsin Assembly, 31st district (2012–2020) ===
| Year | Election | Date | Elected | | | | Defeated | | | | Total | Plurality |
|---|---|---|---|---|---|---|---|---|---|---|---|---|
| 2012 | General | Nov. 6 | Amy Loudenbeck | Republican | 16,463 | 56.47% | Ryan J. Schroeder | Dem. | 12,653 | 43.41% | 29,151 | 3,810 |
| 2014 | General | Nov. 4 | Amy Loudenbeck (inc) | Republican | 17,721 | 98.54% | --unopposed-- | | | | 17,983 | |
| 2016 | General | Nov. 8 | Amy Loudenbeck (inc) | Republican | 18,465 | 64.02% | Clinton Anderson | Dem. | 10,348 | 35.88% | 28,843 | 8,117 |
| 2018 | General | Nov. 6 | Amy Loudenbeck (inc) | Republican | 15,299 | 57.47% | Brittany Keyes | Dem. | 11,305 | 42.46% | 26,623 | 3,994 |
| 2020 | General | Nov. 3 | Amy Loudenbeck (inc) | Republican | 19,962 | 59.51% | Elizabeth Lochner-Abel | Dem. | 13,551 | 40.40% | 33,543 | 6,411 |

=== Wisconsin Secretary of State (2022) ===
Wisconsin Secretary of State Election, 2022
| Party | Candidate | Votes | % | ±% |
|---|---|---|---|---|
Republican Primary, August 9, 2022
| Republican | Amy Loudenbeck | 264,940 | 46.21% | |
| Republican | Jay Schroeder | 228,191 | 39.80% | |
| Republican | Justin D. Schmidtka | 78,846 | 13.75% | |
| | Scattering | 1,338 | 0.23% | |
| Plurality | | 36,749 | 6.41% | |
| Total votes | | 573,315 | 100.0% | |
General Election, November 8, 2022
| Democratic | Doug La Follette (incumbent) | 1,268,748 | 48.30% | −4.44pp |
| Republican | Amy Loudenbeck | 1,261,306 | 48.01% | +0.84pp |
| Libertarian | Neil Harmon | 54,413 | 2.07% | |
| Green | Sharyl R. McFarland | 41,532 | 1.58% | |
| | Scattering | 944 | 0.04% | |
| Plurality | | 7,442 | 0.28% | -5.28pp |
| Total votes | | 2,626,943 | 100.0% | +0.34% |
| Democratic hold | | | | |

Party political offices
| Preceded by Jay Schroeder | Republican nominee for Secretary of State of Wisconsin; 2022 | Most recent |
Wisconsin State Assembly
| Preceded by Chuck Benedict | Member of the Wisconsin State Assembly from the 45th district January 3, 2011 – January 7, 2013 | Succeeded by Janis Ringhand |
| Preceded by Stephen Nass | Member of the Wisconsin State Assembly from the 31st district January 7, 2013 – January 2, 2023 | Succeeded by Ellen Schutt |
