= 108th Wisconsin Legislature =

Wisconsin legislative term for 2027–2028

←	107th	109th	→
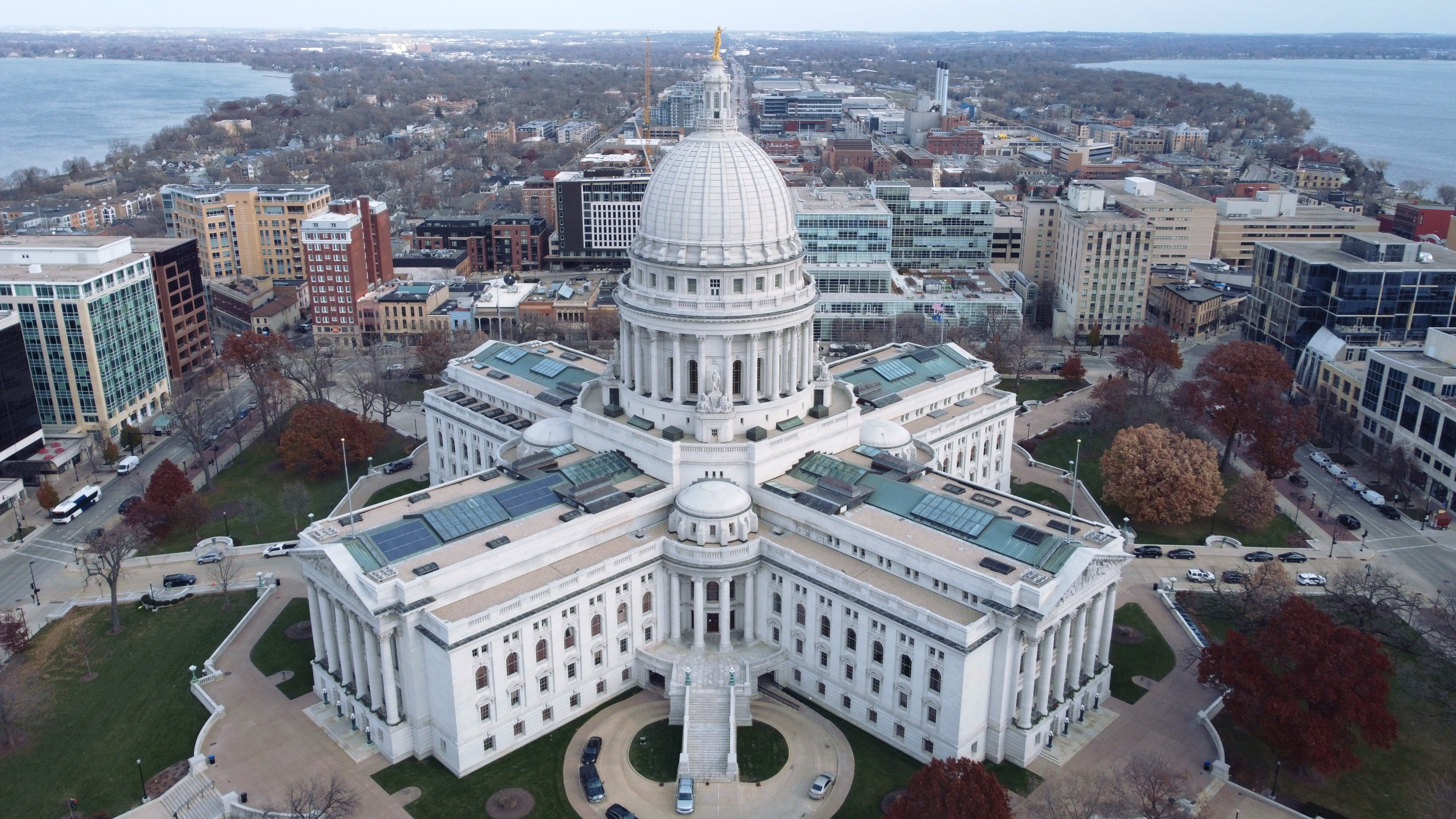
- Wisconsin State Capitol

Overview
- Legislative body: Wisconsin Legislature
- Meeting place: Wisconsin State Capitol
- Term: January 4, 2027 – January 1, 2029
- Election: November 3, 2026

Senate
- Members: 33
- Senate President: Mark Spreitzer (D)
- President pro tempore: Dora Drake (D)
- Party control: Democratic

Assembly
- Members: 99
- Assembly Speaker: Greta Neubauer (D)
- Speaker pro tempore: Lisa Subeck (D)
- Party control: Democratic

The One Hundred Eighth Wisconsin Legislature is the next scheduled legislative term in Wisconsin. It is scheduled to convene on January 4, 2027, and is scheduled to conclude on January 1, 2029, though it will likely adjourn for legislative activity in the Spring of 2028.

This will be the first session since 2010 in which the Democratic Party will hold full control of state government. This is set to be a term of historic firsts in Wisconsin government, with the first African American governor of Wisconsin, David Crowley, and the first female speaker of the Wisconsin State Assembly, Greta Neubauer.

Senators representing odd-numbered districts will be newly elected for this session to serve the first two years of a four-year term. Assembly members will be serving a two-year term. Assembly members and odd-numbered senators will be elected in the general election of November 3, 2026. Senators representing even-numbered districts will be serving the third and fourth year of their four-year term, having been elected in the general election of November 5, 2024.

For the first time since the 104th Wisconsin Legislature, there will be a new governor of Wisconsin at the start of the 108th Legislature.

== Major events ==
- January 4, 2027: Inauguration of the 47th governor of Wisconsin.
- April 6, 2027: 2027 Wisconsin Spring election:
  - 2027 Wisconsin Supreme Court election
- April 4, 2028: 2028 Wisconsin Spring election:
  - 2028 Wisconsin Supreme Court election
- November 7, 2028: 2028 United States general election:
  - 2028 United States presidential election
  - 2028 United States Senate election in Wisconsin

== Party summary ==
=== Senate summary ===
Affiliation	Party (Shading indicates majority caucus)		Total	
Affiliation	Democratic	Republican	Total	Vacant
End of previous legislature	15	18	33	0
Incoming session	18	15	33	0

=== Assembly summary ===
Affiliation	Party (Shading indicates majority caucus)		Total	
Affiliation	Democratic	Republican	Total	Vacant
End of previous legislature	45	54	99	0
Incoming session	53	46	99	0

== Leadership ==
=== Senate leadership ===
- President of the Senate: Mark Spreitzer (D–Beloit)
- President pro tempore: Dora Drake (D–Milwaukee)

Senate majority leadership (Democratic)

- Senate Majority Leader: Dianne Hesselbein (D–Middleton)
- Assistant Majority Leader: Kristin Dassler-Alfheim (D–Appleton)
- Senate Majority Caucus Chair: Melissa Ratcliff (D–Cottage Grove)
- Senate Majority Caucus Vice Chair: Jeff Smith (D–Brunswick)

Senate minority leadership (Republican)

- Senate Minority Leader: Julian Bradley (R–New Berlin)
- Assistant Minority Leader: Romaine Quinn (R–Birchwood)
- Senate Minority Caucus Chair: Rachael Cabral-Guevara (R–Fox Crossing)
- Senate Minority Caucus Vice Chair: Dan Feyen (R–Fond du Lac)

=== Assembly leadership ===
- Speaker of the Assembly: Greta Neubauer (D–Racine)
- Speaker pro tempore: Lisa Subeck (D–Madison)

Assembly majority leadership (Democratic)

- Assembly Majority Leader: Kalan Haywood (D–Milwaukee)
- Assistant Majority Leader: Mike Bare (D–Verona)
- Assembly Majority Caucus Chair: Clinton Anderson (D–Beloit)
- Assembly Majority Caucus Vice Chair: Karen DeSanto (D–Baraboo)
- Assembly Majority Caucus Secretary: Ann Roe (D–Janesville)
- Assembly Majority Caucus Sergeant-at-Arms: Margaret Arney (D–Wauwatosa)

Assembly minority leadership (Republican)

- Assembly Minority Leader: Tyler August (R–Walworth)
- Assistant Minority Leader: Nate Gustafson (R–Omro)
- Assembly Minority Caucus Chair: Mark Born (R–Beaver Dam)
- Assembly Minority Caucus Vice Chair: Joy Goeben (R–Hobart)
- Assembly Minority Caucus Secretary: Barbara Dittrich (R–Oconomowoc)
- Assembly Minority Caucus Sergeant-at-Arms: William Penterman (R–Hustisford)

== See also ==
- 2024 Wisconsin elections
  - 2024 Wisconsin Senate election
  - 2024 Wisconsin State Assembly election
- 2026 Wisconsin elections
  - 2026 Wisconsin Senate election
  - 2026 Wisconsin State Assembly election
