= Wisconsin's 31st Assembly district =

American legislative district in southern Wisconsin

Wisconsin's 31st State Assembly district
- 2024 map defined in 2023 Wisc. Act 94; 2022 map defined in Johnson v. Wisconsin Elections Commission; 2011 map was defined in 2011 Wisc. Act 43
Assemblymember
Tyler August; R–Walworth
since January 6, 2025 (1 years)
- Demographics: 84.59% White; 1.13% Black; 11.03% Hispanic; 1.2% Asian; 1.69% Native American; 0.07% Hawaiian/Pacific Islander
- Population (2020) • Voting age: 59,181; 46,604
- Website: Official website
- Notes: Southern Wisconsin

The 31st Assembly district of Wisconsin is one of 99 districts in the Wisconsin State Assembly. Located in southern Wisconsin, the district comprises much of central and southern Walworth County along with part of southeast Rock County. It includes the cities of Delavan and Elkhorn, and the villages of Clinton, Darien, Fontana-on-Geneva Lake, Sharon, and Williams Bay. It also contains historic Yerkes Observatory, Geneva National Golf Club, and most of the Alpine Valley Resort. The district is represented by Republican majority leader Tyler August, since January 2025; August previously represented the 32nd district from 2011 to 2025.

The 31st Assembly district is located within Wisconsin's 11th Senate district, along with the 32nd and 33rd Assembly districts.

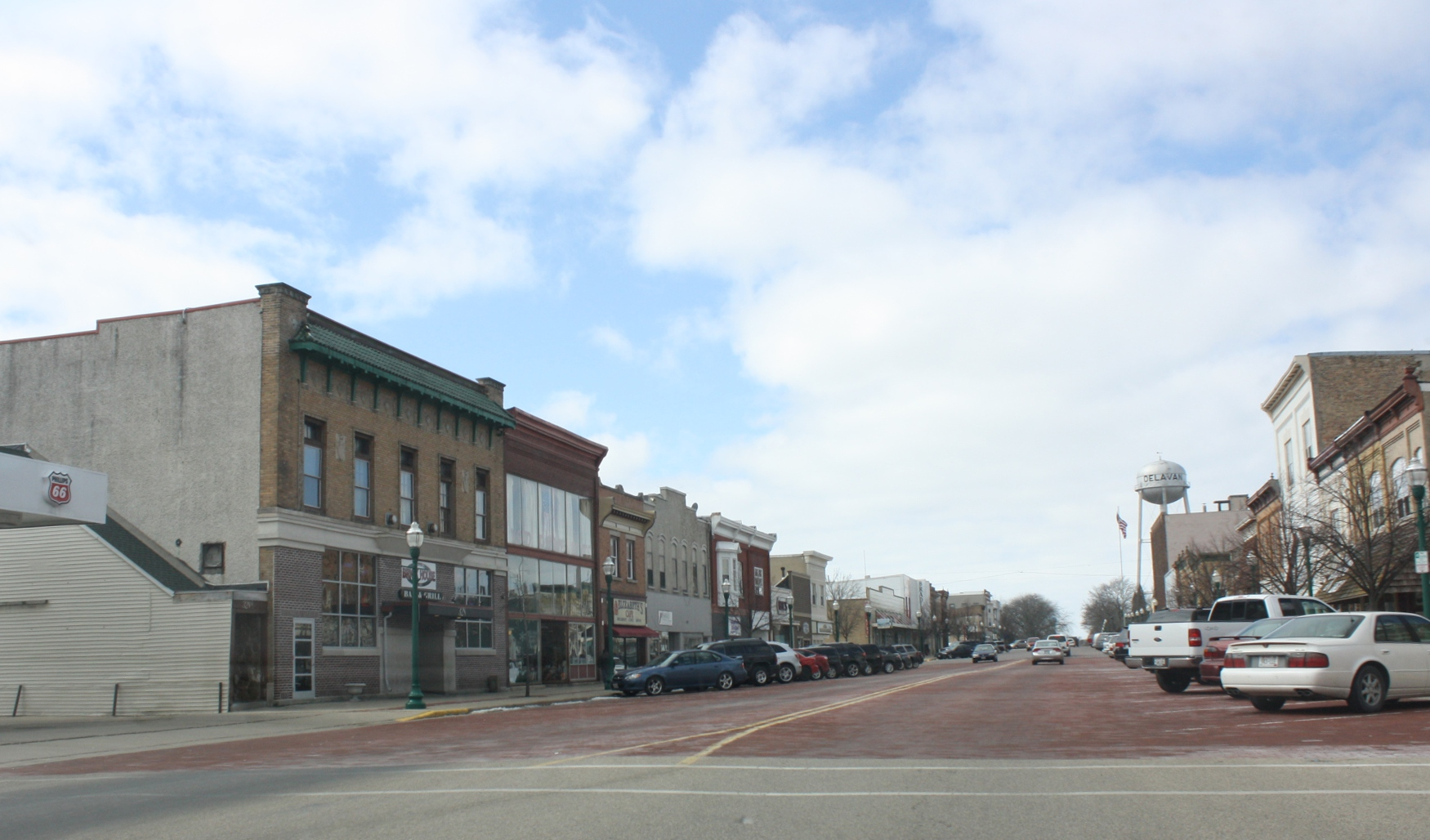
Downtown Delavan

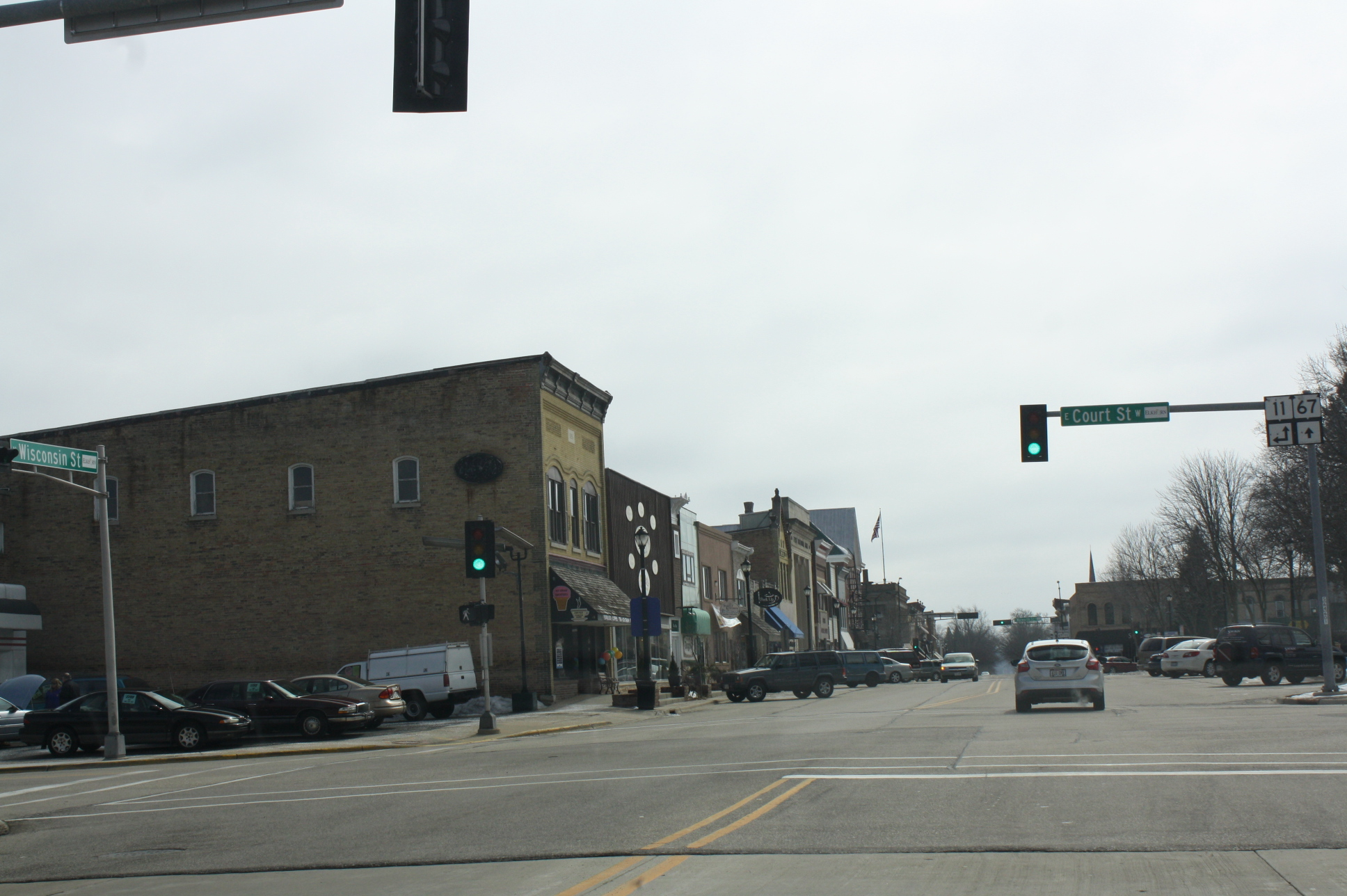
Downtown Elkhorn

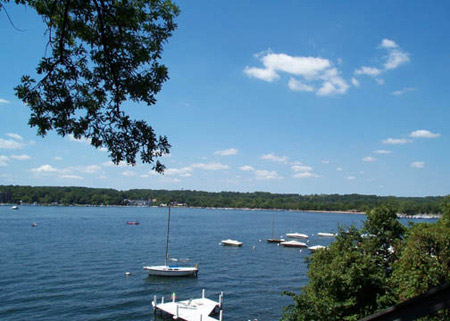
Williams Bay, Wisconsin

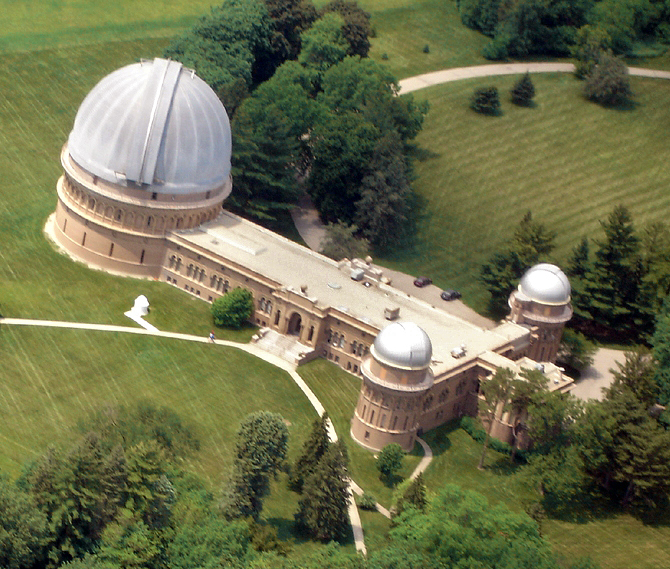
Yerkes Observatory

== List of past representatives ==
List of representatives to the Wisconsin State Assembly from the 31st district
Member	Party	Residence	Counties represented	Term start	Term end	Ref.
District created
Paul Sicula	Dem.	Milwaukee	Milwaukee	January 1, 1973	January 3, 1977	
Mordecai Lee	Dem.	Milwaukee	Milwaukee	January 3, 1977	January 3, 1983	
Randall J. Radtke	Rep.	Lake Mills	Jefferson	January 3, 1983	January 7, 1985	
Joanne Huelsman	Rep.	Waukesha	Waukesha	January 7, 1985	January 7, 1991	
Daniel P. Vrakas	Rep.	Hartland	Waukesha	January 7, 1991	January 4, 1993	
Stephen Nass	Rep.	Whitewater	Jefferson, Walworth, Waukesha	January 4, 1993	January 7, 2013	
Amy Loudenbeck	Rep.	Clinton	Rock, Walworth	January 7, 2013	January 2, 2023	
Ellen Schutt	Rep.	Clinton	Rock, Walworth	January 3, 2023	January 6, 2025	
Tyler August	Rep.	Walworth	Rock, Walworth	January 6, 2025	Current	
