= Mark Spreitzer =

21st century American politician (born 1986)

Member of the Wisconsin Senate from the 15th district
- Incumbent
- Assumed office January 3, 2023
- Preceded by: Janis Ringhand

Member of the Wisconsin State Assembly from the 45th district
- In office January 3, 2015 – January 3, 2023
- Preceded by: Janis Ringhand
- Succeeded by: Clinton Anderson

Personal details
- Born: December 16, 1986 (age 39) Chicago, Illinois, U.S.
- Party: Democratic
- Spouse: Philip Gorman
- Education: Beloit College (BA)
- Website: State Senate website

Mark Spreitzer (born December 16, 1986) is an American Democratic politician from Beloit, Wisconsin. He is a member of the Wisconsin Senate, representing Wisconsin's 15th Senate district since 2023. He previously served four terms in the Wisconsin State Assembly, from 2015 to 2023, and before that was a member of the Beloit City Council.

== Early life and education ==
Mark Spreitzer was born in Chicago, Illinois, in 1986. He was raised and educated in Chicago, graduating from Northside College Preparatory High School in 2005. He attended Beloit College, in Beloit, Wisconsin, and decided to remain there after earning his bachelor's degree in 2009.

After graduating from college, Spreitzer worked as the assistant director of alumni and parent relations and annual support at Beloit College.

== Political career ==
During and after college, Spreitzer became active in politics with the Democratic Party of Wisconsin. He volunteered for the U.S. House campaigns of Tammy Baldwin, the 2008 presidential campaign of Barack Obama, and the 2010 U.S. Senate campaign of Russ Feingold.

In 2011, Spreitzer ran for a seat on the Beloit city council. Beloit's city council elected its members in at-large multi-winner elections. In 2011, seven candidates were seeking three seats on the city council, with two incumbents running for re-election. Spreitzer was ultimately one of two new candidates to win a seat on the council, and served until 2015, serving as council president for the 2014–2015 term.

In the fall of 2013, state senator Timothy Cullen announced his retirement from politics; his resignation prompted state representative Janis Ringhand to announce her candidacy to succeed him, creating an open seat in the 45th Assembly district. In early December 2013, Spreitzer announced that he would run to succeed her in the Wisconsin State Assembly. Shortly after announcing his candidacy, he was elected city council president. In the Assembly race, he faced one opponent for the Democratic Party nomination, fellow Beloit city councilmember Sheila De Forest. After a close contest, Spreitzer prevailed with 54% of the vote. He faced no opponent in the general election, and went on to represent the 45th Assembly district in the 102nd Wisconsin Legislature. He was re-elected without opposition in 2016, and defeated a Libertarian Party opponent in 2018. He faced his first Republican opponent in 2020, and prevailed with 55% of the vote.

In coordinated announcements in March 2022, Janis Ringhand announced she would not run for a third term in the Wisconsin Senate, and Spreitzer announced that he would run to succeed her in the 15th Senate district. He faced no opposition in the Democratic primary and won the general election with 60% of the vote. Since joining the state Senate, Spreitzer has served on the Senate Committee on Agriculture and Revenue, and in the 2025 term, he was also assigned to the Committee on Government Operations, Labor and Economic Development, and the Committee on Transportation and Local Government.

== Personal life ==
Spreitzer is openly gay. He is one of several openly LGBTQ members of the Wisconsin State Legislature.

== Electoral history ==
=== Wisconsin Assembly (2014–2020) ===
Year	Election	Date	Elected				Defeated				Total	Plurality
2014	Primary	Aug. 12	Mark Spreitzer	Democratic	1,993	54.07%	Sheila De Forest	Dem.	1,691	45.88%	3,686	302
2014	General	Nov. 4	Mark Spreitzer	Democratic	12,856	99.02%	--unopposed--				12,983	
2016	General	Nov. 8	Mark Spreitzer (inc)	Democratic	17,867	98.00%	--unopposed--				18,231	
2018	General	Nov. 7	Mark Spreitzer (inc)	Democratic	14,198	79.10%	Reese Wood	Lib.	3,496	19.48%	17,950	10,702
2020	General	Nov. 3	Mark Spreitzer (inc)	Democratic	14,451	54.80%	Tawny Gustina	Rep.	11,895	45.11%	26,370	2,556

=== Wisconsin Senate (2022–present) ===
Year	Election	Date	Elected				Defeated				Total	Plurality
2022	General	Nov. 8	Mark Spreitzer	Democratic	46,192	61.38%	Mark Trofimchuck	Rep.	29,006	38.54%	75,260	17,186
