= 2022 Wisconsin State Assembly election =

- November 8, 2022

All 99 seats in the Wisconsin State Assembly 50 seats needed for a majority
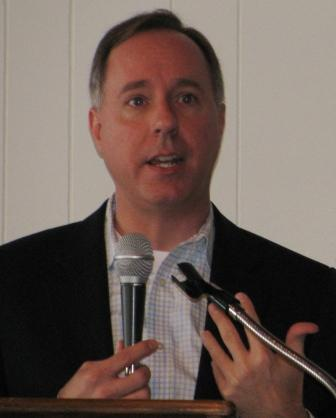

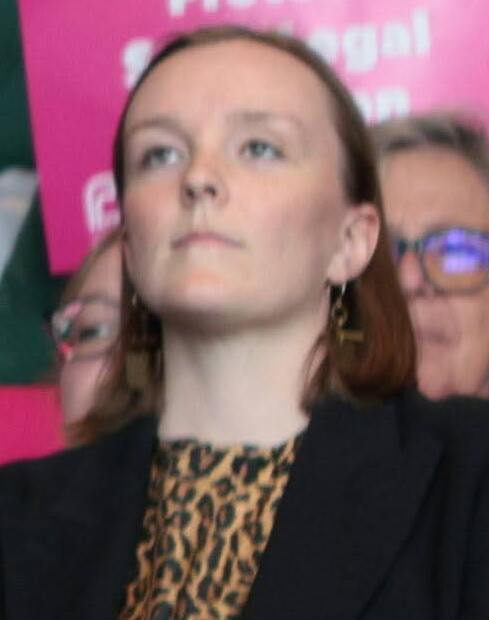
	Majority party	Minority party
Leader	Robin Vos	Greta Neubauer
Party	Republican	Democratic
Leader since	January 7, 2013	January 10, 2022
Leader's seat	63rd–Rochester	66th–Racine
Last election	61 seats, 53.80%	38 seats, 45.29%
Seats before	61	38
Seats won	64	35
Seat change	▲3	▼3
Popular vote	1,350,083	1,124,962
Percentage	53.6%	44.6
Swing	▼0.2 pp	▼0.7 pp
- Republican hold Republican gain Democratic hold 50–60% 60–70% 70–80% >90% 50–60% 60–70% 70–80% 80–90% >90%
Speaker before election
Robin Vos
Republican
Elected Speaker
Robin Vos
Republican

The Wisconsin State Assembly elections of 2022 were held on Tuesday, November 8, 2022. All 99 seats in the Wisconsin State Assembly were up for election. This was the first and only election to take place after redistricting following the 2020 United States census, where the courts had put in place maps set out in the Johnson decision. Before the election, 61 Assembly seats were held by Republicans and 38 seats were held by Democrats. The primary election was held on August 9, 2022.

Republicans flipped three Democratic-held Assembly seats but failed to achieve a two-thirds supermajority, entering the 106th Wisconsin Legislature with 64 of 99 State Assembly seats.

Elected members took office on January 3, 2023.

== Results summary ==
Seats		Party (majority caucus shading)		Total
Seats		Democratic	Republican	Total
Last election (2020)		38	61	99
Total after last election (2020)		38	61	99
Total before this election		38	61	99
Up for election		38	61	99
of which:	Incumbent retiring	10	9	19
of which:	Vacated	0	4	4
of which:	Unopposed	8	10	18
This election		35	64	99
Change from last election		▼3	▲3	Steady
Total after this election		35	64	99
Change in total		▼3	▲3	Steady

=== Close races ===
Seats where the margin of victory was under 10%:

1. State Assembly district 33, 0.91%
2. State Assembly district 73, 1.87% (gain)
3. State Assembly district 84, 2.03%
4. State Assembly district 94, 2.62%
5. State Assembly district 74, 5.71% (gain)
6. State Assembly district 54, 7.73%
7. State Assembly district 21, 8.43%
8. State Assembly district 55, 9.12%

== Outgoing incumbents ==
=== Retiring ===
- Gary Hebl (D–Sun Prairie), representing District 46, did not run for re-election.
- Gordon Hintz (D–Oshkosh), representing District 54, did not run for re-election.
- Beth Meyers (D–Bayfield), representing District 74, did not run for re-election.
- Nick Milroy (D–South Range), representing District 73, did not run for re-election.
- Sondy Pope (D–Mount Horeb), representing District 80, did not run for re-election.
- Joe Sanfelippo (R–New Berlin), representing District 15, did not run for re-election.
- Ken Skowronski (R–Franklin), representing District 82, did not run for re-election.
- Gary Tauchen (R–Bonduel), representing District 6, did not run for re-election.
- Jeremy Thiesfeldt (R–Fond du Lac), representing District 52, did not run for re-election.

=== Seeking other office ===
- David Bowen (D–Milwaukee), representing District 10, ran for the Democratic nomination for lieutenant governor, but then withdrew before the primary.
- Jonathan Brostoff (D–Milwaukee), representing District 19, was elected to Milwaukee city council.
- Rachael Cabral-Guevara (R–Fox Crossing), representing District 55, was elected to the Wisconsin State Senate.
- Dianne Hesselbein (D–Middleton), representing District 79, was elected to the Wisconsin State Senate.
- Cody Horlacher (R–Mukwonago), representing District 33, retired to run for Wisconsin circuit court judge in 2023.
- Jesse James (R–Altoona), representing District 68, was elected to the Wisconsin State Senate.
- Amy Loudenbeck (R–Clinton), representing District 31, ran for Wisconsin Secretary of State.
- Timothy Ramthun (R–Campbellsport), representing District 59, ran for Governor of Wisconsin.
- Sara Rodriguez (D–Brookfield), representing District 13, was elected lieutenant governor.
- Mark Spreitzer (D–Beloit), representing District 45, was elected to the Wisconsin State Senate.

=== Vacated ===
- Samantha Kerkman (R–Salem Lakes), representing District 61, resigned in June 2022 to serve as Kenosha County executive.
- Mike Kuglitsch (R–New Berlin), representing District 84, resigned in May 2022.
- Jim Steineke (R–Vandenbroek), representing District 5, resigned from office in July 2022.
- Tyler Vorpagel (R–Plymouth), representing District 27, resigned in June 2022.

== Election results ==
Dist.	Incumbent				This race	
Dist.	Member	Party	First elect	Status	Candidates	Results
01	Joel Kitchens	Republican	2014	Running	✓ Joel Kitchens (Rep.) 62.45%; Roberta Thelen (Dem.) 37.46%	Incumbent re-elected
02	Shae Sortwell	Republican	2018	Running	✓ Shae Sortwell (Rep.) 59.18%; Renee Gasch (Dem.) 40.74%	Incumbent re-elected
03	Ron Tusler	Republican	2016	Running	✓ Ron Tusler (Rep.) 98.33%	Incumbent re-elected
04	David Steffen	Republican	2014	Running	✓ David Steffen (Rep.) 55.49%; Derek Teague (Dem.) 44.42%	Incumbent re-elected
05	Jim Steineke	Republican	2010	Vacant	✓ Joy Goeben (Rep.) 59.83%; Joseph Van Deurzen (Dem.) 40.17%	Incumbent resigned New member elected Republican hold
06	Gary Tauchen	Republican	2006	Not running	✓ Peter Schmidt (Rep.) 55.60%; William J. Switalla (Dem.) 29.08%; Dean Neubert (Rep.) (write-in) 15.31%	Incumbent retired New member elected Republican hold
07	Daniel Riemer	Democratic	2012	Running	✓ Daniel Riemer (Dem.) 61.81%; Zachary Marshall (Rep.) 38.1%	Incumbent re-elected
08	Sylvia Ortiz-Velez	Democratic	2020	Running	✓ Sylvia Ortiz-Velez (Dem.) 98.1%	Incumbent re-elected
09	Marisabel Cabrera	Democratic	2018	Running	✓ Marisabel Cabrera (Dem.) 71.99%; Ryan M. Antczak (Rep.) 27.86%	Incumbent re-elected
10	David Bowen	Democratic	2014	Not running	✓ Darrin Madison (Dem.) 98.79%	Incumbent retired New member elected Democratic hold
11	Dora Drake	Democratic	2020	Running	✓ Dora Drake (Dem.) 99%	Incumbent re-elected
12	LaKeshia Myers	Democratic	2018	Running	✓ LaKeshia N. Myers (Dem.) 78.79%; Greg Canady (Rep.) 21.1%	Incumbent re-elected
13	Sara Rodriguez	Democratic	2020	Running for lieutenant governor	✓ Tom Michalski (Rep.) 56.26%; Sarah Harrison (Dem.) 43.66%	Incumbent retired to run for Lieutenant Governor; New member elected Republican gain
14	Robyn Vining	Democratic	2018	Running	✓ Robyn Vining (Dem.) 63.35%; Keva Turner (Rep.) 36.57%	Incumbent re-elected
15	Joe Sanfelippo	Republican	2012	Not running	✓ Dave Maxey (Rep.) 95.81%	Incumbent retired New member elected Republican hold
16	Kalan Haywood	Democratic	2018	Running	✓ Kalan Haywood (Dem.) 98.75%	Incumbent re-elected
17	Supreme Moore Omokunde	Democratic	2020	Running	✓ Supreme Moore Omokunde (Dem.) 83.91%; Abie Eisenbach (Rep.) 15.93%	Incumbent re-elected
18	Evan Goyke	Democratic	2012	Running	✓ Evan Goyke (Dem.) 98.45%	Incumbent re-elected
19	Jonathan Brostoff	Democratic	2014	Running for city council	✓ Ryan Clancy (Dem.) 98.26%	Incumbent retired to run for City Council; New member elected Democratic hold
20	Christine Sinicki	Democratic	1998	Running	✓ Christine M. Sinicki (Dem.) 66.32%; Scott Hermann (Rep.) 33.57%	Incumbent re-elected
21	Jessie Rodriguez	Republican	2013	Running	✓ Jessie Rodriguez (Rep.) 54.18%; Nathan M. Jurowski (Dem.) 45.75%	Incumbent re-elected
22	Janel Brandtjen	Republican	2014	Running	✓ Janel Brandtjen (Rep.) 64.55%; Matt Brown (Dem.) 35.38%	Incumbent re-elected
23	Deb Andraca	Democratic	2020	Running	✓ Deb Andraca (Dem.) 62.73%; Purnima Nath (Rep.) 37.19%	Incumbent re-elected
24	Dan Knodl	Republican	2008	Running	✓ Dan Knodl (Rep.) 61.14%; Bob Tatterson (Dem.) 38.81%	Incumbent re-elected
25	Paul Tittl	Republican	2012	Running	✓ Paul Tittl (Rep.) 97.11%	Incumbent re-elected
26	Terry Katsma	Republican	2014	Running	✓ Terry A. Katsma (Rep.) 62.8%; Lisa Salgado (Dem.) 37.12%	Incumbent re-elected
27	Tyler Vorpagel	Republican	2014	Not running	✓ Amy Binsfeld (Rep.) 64.41%; Chester A. Gerlach (Ind.) 35.24%	Incumbent retired New member elected Republican hold
28	Gae Magnafici	Republican	2018	Running	✓ Gae Magnafici (Rep.) 62.48%; Patty Schachtner (Dem.) 37.51%	Incumbent re-elected
29	Clint Moses	Republican	2020	Running	✓ Clint Moses (Rep.) 60.05%; Danielle Johnson (Dem.) 39.93%	Incumbent re-elected
30	Shannon Zimmerman	Republican	2016	Running	✓ Shannon Zimmerman (Rep.) 58.48%; Sarah Yacoub (Dem.) 41.44%	Incumbent re-elected
31	Amy Loudenbeck	Republican	2010	Running for secretary of state	✓ Ellen Schutt (Rep.) 59.15%; Brienne Brown (Dem.) 40.77%	Incumbent retired to run for Secretary of State; New member elected Republican hold
32	Tyler August	Republican	2010	Running	✓ Tyler August (Rep.) 62.89%; Adam Jaramillo (Dem.) 37%	Incumbent re-elected
33	Cody Horlacher	Republican	2014	Running for circuit court	✓ Scott Johnson (Rep.) 50.4%; Don Vruwink (Dem.) 49.49%	New member elected Republican hold
34	Rob Swearingen	Republican	2012	Running	✓ Rob Swearingen (Rep.) 61.77%; Eileen Daniel (Dem.) 38.2%	Incumbent re-elected
35	Calvin Callahan	Republican	2020	Running	✓ Calvin Callahan (Rep.) 69.79%; Todd Frederick (Ind.) 30.1%	Incumbent re-elected
36	Jeffrey Mursau	Republican	2004	Running	✓ Jeffrey Mursau (Rep.) 70.4%; Ben Murray (Dem.) 29.53%	Incumbent re-elected
37	William Penterman	Republican	2021	Running	✓ William Penterman (Rep.) 55.77%; Maureen McCarville (Dem.) 44.18%	Incumbent re-elected
38	Barbara Dittrich	Republican	2018	Running	✓ Barbara Dittrich (Rep.) 95.26%	Incumbent re-elected
39	Mark Born	Republican	2012	Running	✓ Mark Born (Rep.) 97.64%	Incumbent re-elected
40	Kevin David Petersen	Republican	2006	Running	✓ Kevin Petersen (Rep.) 75.29%; Henry Fries (Ind.) 24.48%	Incumbent re-elected
41	Alex Dallman	Republican	2020	Running	✓ Alex Dallman (Rep.) 96.88%	Incumbent re-elected
42	Jon Plumer	Republican	2018 (special)	Running	✓ Jon Plumer (Rep.) 60.18%; Theresa Valencia (Dem.) 39.75%	Incumbent re-elected
43	Don Vruwink	Democratic	2016	Not running	✓ Jenna Jacobson (Dem.) 62.26%; Marisa Voelkel (Rep.) 37.66%	Incumbent redistricted to 33rd Assembly District; New member elected Democratic hold
44	Sue Conley	Democratic	2020	Running	✓ Sue Conley (Dem.) 62.44%; Spencer Zimmerman (Rep.) 37.5%	Incumbent re-elected
45	Mark Spreitzer	Democratic	2014	Running for State Senate	✓ Clinton Anderson (Dem.) 55.75%; Jeff Klett (Rep.) 44.18%	New member elected Democratic hold
46	Gary Hebl	Democratic	2004	Not running	✓ Melissa Ratcliff (Dem.) 69.65%; Andrew McKinney (Rep.) 30.27%	New member elected Democratic hold
47	Jimmy P. Anderson	Democratic	2016	Running	✓ Jimmy Anderson (Dem.) 79.9%; Lamonte Newsom (Rep.) 20.02%	Incumbent re-elected
48	Samba Baldeh	Democratic	2020	Running	✓ Samba Baldeh (Dem.) 98.44%	Incumbent re-elected
49	Travis Tranel	Republican	2010	Running	✓ Travis Tranel (Rep.) 62.59%; Lynne Parrott (Dem.) 37.34%	Incumbent re-elected
50	Tony Kurtz	Republican	2018	Running	✓ Tony Kurtz (Rep.) 64.53%; Michael Leuth (Dem.) 35.45%	Incumbent re-elected
51	Todd Novak	Republican	2014	Running	✓ Todd Novak (Rep.) 56.08%; Leah Spicer (Dem.) 43.87%	Incumbent re-elected
52	Jeremy Thiesfeldt	Republican	2010	Not running	✓ Jerry L. O'Connor (Rep.) 62.26%; Joe Lavrenz (Dem.) 37.67%	New member elected Republican hold
53	Michael Schraa	Republican	2012	Running	✓ Michael Schraa (Rep.) 97.63%	Incumbent re-elected
54	Gordon Hintz	Democratic	2006	Not running	✓ Lori Palmeri (Dem.) 53.79%; Donnie Herman (Rep.) 46.06%	New member elected Democratic hold
55	Rachael Cabral-Guevara	Republican	2020	Running for state senate	✓ Nate Gustafson (Rep.) 54.53%; Stefanie A. Holt (Dem.) 45.41%	New member elected Republican hold
56	Dave Murphy	Republican	2012	Running	✓ Dave Murphy (Rep.) 59.03%; Patrick Hayden (Dem.) 40.97%	Incumbent re-elected
57	Lee Snodgrass	Democratic	2020	Running	✓ Lee Snodgrass (Dem.) 59.36%; Andrew Fox (Rep.) 40.58%	Incumbent re-elected
58	Rick Gundrum	Republican	2018	Running	✓ Rick Gundrum (Rep.) 70.27%; Mary Ann Rzeszutek (Dem.) 29.73%	Incumbent re-elected
59	Timothy Ramthun	Republican	2018	Running for governor	✓ Ty Bodden (Rep.) 99.36%	New member elected Republican hold
60	Robert Brooks	Republican	2011	Running	✓ Robert Brooks (Rep.) 64.72%; Daniel Larsen (Dem.) 35.2%	Incumbent re-elected
61	Samantha Kerkman	Republican	2000	Not running	✓ Amanda Nedweski (Rep.) 64%; Max Winkels (Dem.) 35.94%	New member elected Republican hold
62	Robert Wittke	Republican	2018	Running	✓ Robert Wittke (Rep.) 61.36%; Anthony Hammes (Dem.) 38.51%	Incumbent re-elected
63	Robin Vos	Republican	2004	Running	✓ Robin Vos (Rep.) 72.98%; Joel Jacobsen (Dem.) 15.02%; Adam Steen (Rep.) (write-in) 9.08%	Incumbent re-elected
64	Tip McGuire	Democratic	2019	Running	✓ Tip McGuire (Dem.) 56.73%; Ed Hibsch (Rep.) 43.19%	Incumbent re-elected
65	Tod Ohnstad	Democratic	2012	Running	✓ Tod Ohnstad (Dem.) 61.78%; Frank Petrick (Rep.) 38.08%	Incumbent re-elected
66	Greta Neubauer	Democratic	2018	Running	✓ Greta Neubauer (Dem.) 76.27%; Carl Hutton (Lib.) 22.61%	Incumbent re-elected
67	Rob Summerfield	Republican	2016	Running	✓ Rob Summerfield (Rep.) 63.23%; Jason Bennett (Dem.) 26.72%	Incumbent re-elected
68	Jesse James	Republican	2018	Running for state senate	✓ Karen Hurd (Rep.) 60.68%; Nate Otto (Dem.) 39.25%	New member elected Republican hold
69	Donna Rozar	Republican	2020	Running	✓ Donna M. Rozar (Rep.) 64.27%; Lisa Boero (Dem.) 35.68%	Incumbent re-elected
70	Nancy VanderMeer	Republican	2014	Running	✓ Nancy VanderMeer (Rep.) 65.99%; Remy Gomez (Dem.) 33.94%	Incumbent re-elected
71	Katrina Shankland	Democratic	2012	Running	✓ Katrina Shankland (Dem.) 57.05%; Scott Soik (Rep.) 42.89%	Incumbent re-elected
72	Scott Krug	Republican	2010	Running	✓ Scott S. Krug (Rep.) 62.14%; Criste Greening (Dem.) 37.82%	Incumbent re-elected
73	Nick Milroy	Democratic	2008	Not running	✓ Angie Sapik (Rep.) 50.83%; Laura R. Gapske (Dem.) 48.96%	New member elected Republican gain
74	Beth Meyers	Democratic	2014	Not running	✓ Chanz Green (Rep.) 52.84%; John Adams (Dem.) 47.13%	New member elected Republican gain
75	David Armstrong	Republican	2020	Running	✓ David Armstrong (Rep.) 96.56%	Incumbent re-elected
76	Francesca Hong	Democratic	2020	Running	✓ Francesca Hong (Dem.) 98.39%	Incumbent re-elected
77	Shelia Stubbs	Democratic	2018	Running	✓ Shelia Stubbs (Dem.) 98.7%	Incumbent re-elected
78	Lisa Subeck	Democratic	2014	Running	✓ Lisa B. Subeck (Dem.) 82.02%; Matt Neuhaus (Rep.) 17.88%	Incumbent re-elected
79	Dianne Hesselbein	Democratic	2012	Running for state senate	✓ Alex Joers (Dem.) 74.11%; Victoria Fueger (Rep.) 25.79%	New member elected Democratic hold
80	Sondy Pope	Democratic	2002	Not running	✓ Mike Bare (Dem. 69.66%); Jacob D. Luginbuhl (Rep.) 30.26%	New member elected Democratic hold
81	Dave Considine	Democratic	2014	Running	✓ David Considine (Dem.) 58.9%; Shellie Benish (Rep.) 41.06%	Incumbent re-elected
82	Ken Skowronski	Republican	2013	Not running	✓ Chuck Wichgers (Rep.) 56.74%; Deborah Davis (Dem.) 43.19%	Incumbent redistricted to 82nd Assembly District; Republican hold
83	Chuck Wichgers	Republican	2016	Not running	✓ Nik Rettinger (Rep.) 78.6%; Chaz Self (Ind.) 20.86%	New member elected Republican hold
84	Mike Kuglitsch	Republican	2010	Not running	✓ Bob Donovan (Rep.) 50.98%; Lu Ann Bird (Dem.) 48.95%	New member elected Republican hold
85	Patrick Snyder	Republican	2016	Running	✓ Patrick Snyder (Rep.) 56.2%; Kristin Conway (Dem.) 43.76%	Incumbent re-elected
86	John Spiros	Republican	2012	Running	✓ John Spiros (Rep.) 97.15%	Incumbent re-elected
87	James W. Edming	Republican	2014	Running	✓ James W. Edming (Rep.) 69.49%; Elizabeth Riley (Dem.) 30.48%	Incumbent re-elected
88	John Macco	Republican	2014	Running	✓ John Macco (Rep.) 58.14%; Hannah Beauchamp-Pope (Dem.) 41.78%	Incumbent re-elected
89	Elijah Behnke	Republican	2021	Running	✓ Elijah Behnke (Rep.) 66.52%; Jane Benson (Dem.) 33.42%	Incumbent re-elected
90	Kristina Shelton	Democratic	2020	Running	✓ Kristina Shelton (Dem.) 59.1%; Micah J. Behnke (Rep.) 40.77%	Incumbent re-elected
91	Jodi Emerson	Democratic	2018	Running	✓ Jodi Emerson (Dem.) 64.61%; Josh Stanley (Rep.) 35.3%	Incumbent re-elected
92	Treig Pronschinske	Republican	2016	Running	✓ Treig E. Pronschinske (Rep.) 63.36%; Maria Bamonti (Dem.) 36.58%	Incumbent re-elected
93	Warren Petryk	Republican	2010	Running	✓ Warren Petryk (Rep.) 59.74%; Alison H. Page (Dem.) 40.23%	Incumbent re-elected
94	Steve Doyle	Democratic	2011	Running	✓ Steve Doyle (Dem.) 51.29%; Ryan Huebsch (Rep.) 48.67%	Incumbent re-elected
95	Jill Billings	Democratic	2011	Running	✓ Jill Billings (Dem.) 66.83%; Chris Woodard (Rep.) 33.09%	Incumbent re-elected
96	Loren Oldenburg	Republican	2018	Running	✓ Loren Oldenburg (Rep.) 58.53%; Jayne M. Swiggum (Dem.) 41.42%	Incumbent re-elected
97	Scott Allen	Republican	2014	Running	✓ Scott Allen (Rep.) 96.14%	Incumbent re-elected
98	Adam Neylon	Republican	2013	Running	✓ Adam Neylon (Rep.) 59.22%; Christina Barry (Dem.) 40.72%	Incumbent re-elected
99	Cindi Duchow	Republican	2015	Running	✓ Cindi Duchow (Rep.) 69.55%; Alec Thomas Dahms (Dem.) 30.35%	Incumbent re-elected

== Predictions ==
Source	Ranking	As of
Sabato's Crystal Ball	Safe R	May 19, 2022

== See also ==
- Republican efforts to restrict voting following the 2020 presidential election: Wisconsin
- 2022 Wisconsin elections
  - 2022 Wisconsin gubernatorial election
  - 2022 Wisconsin Attorney General election
  - 2022 Wisconsin State Senate election
  - 2022 United States House of Representatives elections in Wisconsin
- 2022 United States elections
- Wisconsin State Assembly
- Elections in Wisconsin
- Redistricting in Wisconsin
