= Alex Joers =

21st century American politician

Member of the Wisconsin State Assembly
- Incumbent
- Assumed office January 6, 2025
- Preceded by: Dave Considine
- Constituency: 81st district
- In office January 3, 2023 – January 6, 2025
- Preceded by: Dianne Hesselbein
- Succeeded by: Lisa Subeck
- Constituency: 79th district

Member of the Board of Supervisors of Dane County, Wisconsin, from the 9th district
- In office April 21, 2020 – January 3, 2023
- Preceded by: Paul Nelson
- Succeeded by: Steven Peters

Personal details
- Born: August 27, 1992 (age 34) Madison, Wisconsin, U.S.
- Party: Democratic
- Spouse: Kathryn Sikora (m. 2018)
- Children: 2
- Education: University of Wisconsin–La Crosse
- Occupation: Legislator, association executive, business manager
- Website: Official website

Alex Robert Joers (born August 27, 1992) is an American communications professional and Democratic politician from Dane County, Wisconsin. He is a member of the Wisconsin State Assembly, representing Wisconsin's 81st Assembly district since January 2025; he previously represented the 79th Assembly district during the 2023–2024 term. Earlier, he served as a member of the Dane County Board of Supervisors.

== Early life and career ==
Alex Joers was born in Madison, Wisconsin, in 1992; as a child, he moved to the neighboring city of Middleton, Wisconsin, with his parents. He graduated from Middleton High School and earned his bachelor's degree in political science and public administration in 2015 from the University of Wisconsin–La Crosse.

While in high school, Joers was a cross country athlete and for many years taught classes at the gym owned by his parents. Since 2022, he has also been employed as a program manager for AMPED Association Management, a company that provides management services to non-profits. Joers' clients include the Society for Research on Adolescence and the American Physical Therapy Association.

== Political career ==
Joers' political activities began while in college, when he worked on campus get out the vote projects. After graduating from college, he was employed as a legislative aide to state senator Jennifer Shilling and state representative Melissa Agard. He next worked in fundraising for the Wisconsin State Senate Democratic Committee and joined state senator Julie Lassa's 2016 re-election campaign. After the 2016 election, he became a full-time legislative aide to state representative Dianne Hesselbein. In 2019 he was promoted to Hesselbein's communications and policy aide.

In 2020, Joers ran for his first public office under the auspices of the national Run for Something campaign, which seeks to get more young candidates to run for public office. He ran unopposed for an open seat on the Dane County board of supervisors and was re-elected without opposition in 2022.

In December 2021, Dianne Hesselbein announced she would run for Wisconsin State Senate in 2022, and would therefore not run for re-election in Wisconsin's 79th Assembly district. Just after the Spring 2022 election, Joers announced his campaign for the now-open Assembly seat. He later said that he was inspired to run for the office, in part, by the outpouring of support from the Middleton community after the death of his father. He defeated Madison small business owner Brad Votava in the Democratic primary, with 76% of the vote. In the general election, he faced Waunakee nurse Victoria Fueger, who had also run as the Republican candidate in 2020. Joers prevailed with 74% of the vote in the heavily Democratic district.

He assumed office in January 2023.

In light of the 2024 redistricting, which undid the 2011 gerrymander, Joers was moved into the 80th district and was paired with incumbent Mike Bare. To avoid an incumbent-incumbent primary, Joers moved into the open 81st district, where he is running unopposed.

== Personal life and family ==
Alex Joers is the eldest of three children born to Bob and Cindy (née Reinerio) Joers of Milwaukee. Bob Joers was athletic director at Middleton High School for many years. The Joers established The Little Gym of Middleton—a franchise children's gymnastics and recreational facility—in 2004. Bob Joers was a popular figure in the Middleton community; he died of pancreatic cancer in 2020.

Alex Joers married Kathryn "Katie" Sikora in Windsor, Wisconsin, in 2018. They live in Westport, with their son and daughter. Alex and Katie met as students at the University of Wisconsin–La Crosse while working in residence life. During that time, they competed, and lost, in intramural bag toss against the team “Alex Joers”.

== Electoral history ==
=== Wisconsin Assembly, 79th district (2022) ===
Year	Election	Date	Elected				Defeated				Total	Plurality
2022	Primary	Aug. 9	Alex Joers	Democratic	7,474	75.98%	Brad Votava	Dem.	2,356	23.95%	9,837	5,118
2022	General	Nov. 8	Alex Joers	Democratic	24,469	74.11%	Victoria Fueger	Rep.	8,514	25.79%	33,015	15,955

=== Wisconsin Assembly, 81st district (2024) ===
Year	Election	Date	Elected				Defeated	Total	Plurality
2024	General	Nov. 5	Alex Joers	Democratic	30,969	97.74%	--unopposed--	31,686	30,252

Wisconsin State Assembly
Preceded by Dianne Hesselbein	Member of the Wisconsin State Assembly from the 79th district January 3, 2023 – January 6, 2025	Succeeded by Lisa Subeck
Preceded by Dave Considine	Member of the Wisconsin State Assembly from the 81st district January 6, 2025 – present	Incumbent
