= Ty Bodden =

American politician (born 1993)

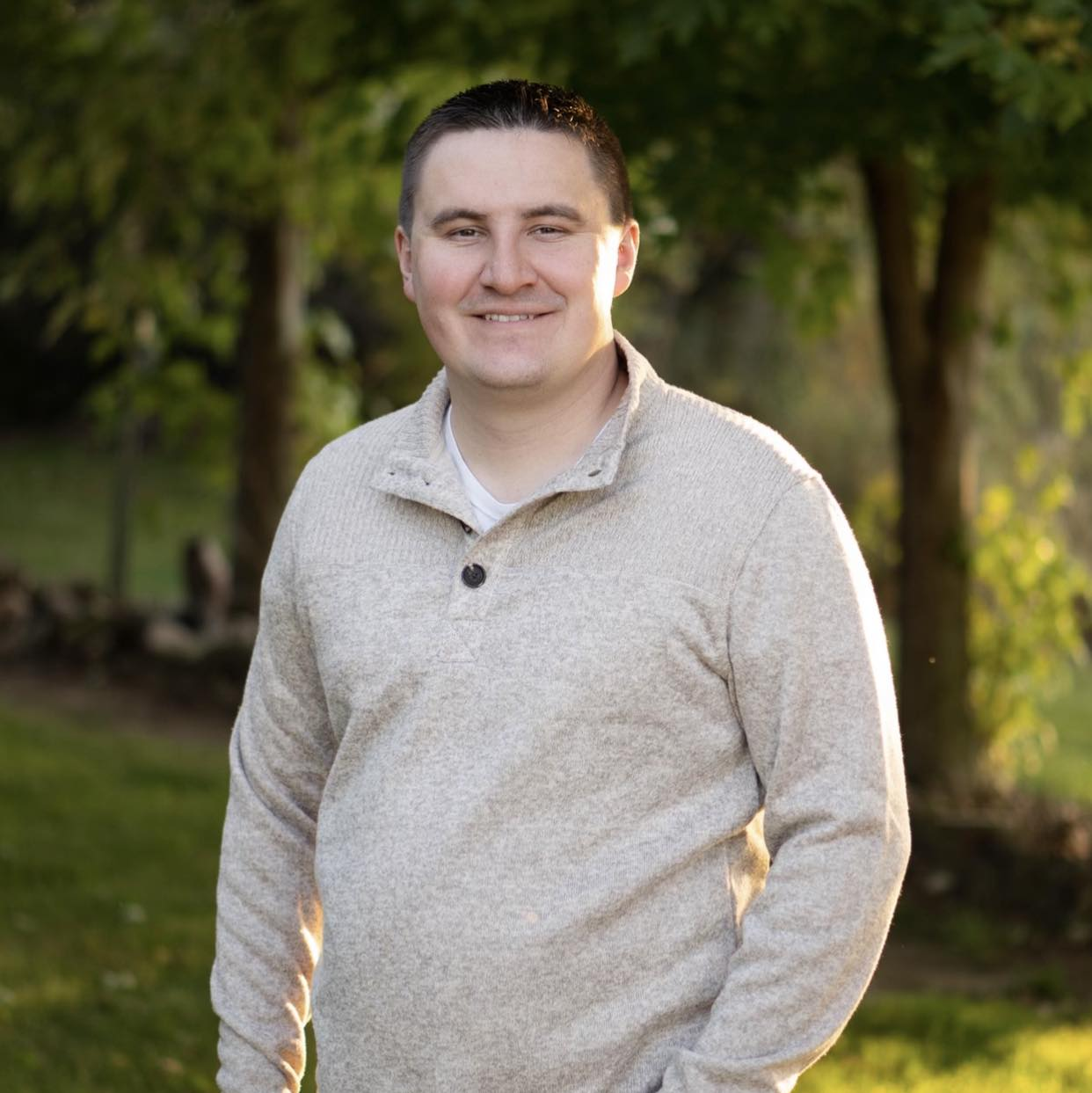

Member of the Wisconsin State Assembly from the 59th district
- In office January 3, 2023 – January 6, 2025
- Preceded by: Timothy Ramthun
- Succeeded by: Robert Brooks

Personal details
- Born: December 15, 1993 (age 32) Madison, Wisconsin, U.S.
- Party: Republican
- Spouse: Paige Mueller
- Children: 3
- Education: University of Wisconsin–Green Bay (BA); Arkansas State University (MPA)
- Occupation: Business Owner & Legislative Researcher
- Website: Official website

Ty Bodden (born December 15, 1993) is an American Republican politician from Calumet County, Wisconsin. He served one term as a member of the Wisconsin State Assembly, representing Wisconsin's 59th Assembly district during the 2023–2024 term. He is also a former chairman of the Republican Party of Calumet County, Wisconsin, and currently serves on the village board of Stockbridge, Wisconsin.

== Biography ==
He graduated from Stockbridge High School, in Stockbridge, Wisconsin, in 2012 and went on to University of Wisconsin–Green Bay, where he earned his bachelor's degree in political science and public administration in 2016. He then completed his master's in public administration from Arkansas State University.

During college, he worked as a ranch hand at Cristo Rey Ranch, which provides animal therapy for children and the elderly with intellectual disabilities. He subsequently became a manager of the ranch, and is now chair of the ranch's nonprofit board. From 2019 through 2022, he worked as administrative staff at two Wisconsin Department of Corrections facilities, Kettle Moraine Correctional Institution and Taycheedah Correctional Institution.

Bodden now works as a Legislative Researcher for The New American, a publication of the John Birch Society, since Spring 2022. He has resided in St. Cloud, Wisconsin, Theresa, Wisconsin, Fond du Lac, Wisconsin, and Kewaskum, Wisconsin.

== Political career ==
Bodden has been involved with the Republican Party of Wisconsin since college, and worked as campaign manager for Jesse Kremer during his first run for Wisconsin State Assembly in 2014. From that campaign, he went directly onto Duey Stroebel's campaign in his special election for Wisconsin Senate in Spring 2015. That summer, he received an internship in the Wisconsin Legislature, and followed that up with internships in the office of the mayor of Green Bay, Wisconsin—which was then Republican Jim Schmitt—through the spring of 2016. He then worked for the Assembly campaign of Ron Tusler. In the fall of 2017, he was appointed to the village board of Stockbridge, Wisconsin, and was subsequently elected to two full terms, leaving office in May 2022.

In January 2018, state representative Jesse Kremer announced he would not run for re-election to a third term in the Assembly. Bodden entered the race for the Republican nomination to succeed Kremer in the 59th Assembly district, and he received Kremer's endorsement, as his former campaign manager. Despite Kremer's endorsement, however, Bodden fell 295 votes short of Timothy Ramthun in the four-candidate Republican primary, and Ramthun went on to win the general election in the heavily Republican district.

Ramthun ultimately served two terms before choosing to run in the Republican primary for Governor of Wisconsin in 2022. He was therefore unable to run for another term in the Assembly, and Bodden announced another attempt for the 59th Assembly district seat in April 2022. He faced Kewaskum tavern owner Vinny Egle in the Republican primary and prevailed decisively with 64% of the vote. He was unopposed in the general election. While running for Assembly in the fall of 2022, he was also employed as an organizer for U.S. senator Ron Johnson's re-election campaign.

He took office in January 2023.

Bodden declined to seek re-election to a second term after being drawn into the 3rd district as a result of redistricting.

Bodden was appointed to the Stockbridge Village Board as a Trustee in May of 2026.

== Personal life and family ==
Bodden is married to his high school sweetheart, Paige Mueller, and resides in the village of Stockbridge. They have two living children. His 3rd-great grandfather, Jacob Bodden, an immigrant from Germany, served three terms as a Democratic member of the Assembly, and was a sheriff of Dodge County, Wisconsin.

== Electoral history ==
=== Wisconsin Assembly (2018) ===
Year	Election	Date	Elected				Defeated				Total	Plurality
2018	Primary	Aug. 14	Timothy Ramthun	Republican	2,851	34.42%	Ty Bodden	Rep.	2,556	30.86%	8,282	295
2018	Primary	Aug. 14	Timothy Ramthun	Republican	2,851	34.42%	Rachel Mixon	Rep.	2,164	26.13%	8,282	295
2018	Primary	Aug. 14	Timothy Ramthun	Republican	2,851	34.42%	Ken Depperman	Rep.	709	8.56%	8,282	295

=== Wisconsin Assembly (2022) ===
Year	Election	Date	Elected				Defeated				Total	Plurality
2022	Primary	Aug. 9	Ty Bodden	Republican	7,891	63.93%	Vinny Egle	Rep.	4,447	36.03%	12,344	3,444
2022	General	Nov. 8	Ty Bodden	Republican	25,716	99.36%	--Unopposed--				25,881	25,551

Wisconsin State Assembly
Preceded by Timothy Ramthun	Member of the Wisconsin State Assembly from the 59th district January 3, 2023 – January 6, 2025	Succeeded by Robert Brooks
