= LeMahieu =

LeMahieu is a French surname. Notable people with the surname include:

- Daniel LeMahieu (1946–2022), American politician from Wisconsin
- Devin LeMahieu (born 1972), American politician from Wisconsin
- DJ LeMahieu (born 1988), American baseball player with Wisconsin roots
