= TLG =

TLG may refer to:

- Tea Leaf Green, a band
- The Lego Group, a company that manufactures LEGO toys
- The Lion Guard, an animated TV series
- The Little Gym, an international franchise of children's gyms
- The Livingston Group, a lobbying firm based in Washington, D.C.
- The Lying Game, a TV series
- Thesaurus Linguae Graecae, a research centre at the University of California
- Tiger Leaping Gorge, a canyon in China
- Top Level Group, a parliamentary group in the United Kingdom
- Trilegiant Corporation, a subsidiary of the Affinion Group
- Troll Lord Games, a publisher of games
- The Limits to Growth, a 1972 computer model of exponential economic growth with finite resources
