= Jerry L. O'Connor =

American politician (born 1953)

Member of the Wisconsin State Assembly
- Incumbent
- Assumed office January 6, 2025
- Preceded by: Robert Brooks
- Succeeded by: Marty Ryan (elect)
- Constituency: 60th district
- In office January 3, 2023 – January 6, 2025
- Preceded by: Jeremy Thiesfeldt
- Succeeded by: Lee Snodgrass
- Constituency: 52nd district

Personal details
- Born: September 14, 1953 (age 73) Lone Rock, Wisconsin, U.S.
- Party: Republican
- Spouses: Amy L. Lansdowne (m. 1972; died 2015); Luanne Bohlman-Romuald
- Children: 2 (with Amy); 3 stepchildren
- Education: Minnesota Bible College; University of Wisconsin–Madison
- Occupation: Banker (retired), politician

Jerry L. O'Connor (born September 14, 1953) is an American Republican politician and retired banker from Fond du Lac, Wisconsin. He is a member of the Wisconsin State Assembly, representing Wisconsin's 60th Assembly district since 2025; he previously represented the 52nd Assembly district from 2023 to 2025. He was the president and C.E.O. of the National Exchange Bank & Trust of Waupun, Wisconsin, from 1998 until his retirement in 2020.

== Biography ==
Jerry O'Connor was born in Lone Rock, Wisconsin on September 14, 1953. Later his family moved to Lomira, Wisconsin and later Madison, where he graduated from Madison West High School in 1971. After graduating from high school, he attended Minnesota Bible College and went on to earn his master's degree from the Graduate School of Banking at the University of Wisconsin–Madison.

He subsequently moved to Fond du Lac, Wisconsin, which has been his primary residence ever since. He had a 40 year career in banking, and was most recently the president and C.E.O. of the National Exchange Bank & Trust of Waupun, Wisconsin, retiring in 2020. During his career, he was also chairman of the Community Bankers of Wisconsin and was co-chair of the board of the Wisconsin Bankers Association.

== Political career ==
In December 2021, incumbent Wisconsin state representative Jeremy Thiesfeldt announced he would not seek a sixth term in the Assembly. The following Spring, O'Connor announced that he would run for the Republican nomination to succeed Thiesfeldt in the 52nd Assembly district. The district covered the city of Fond du Lac and its surroundings and was safely Republican, and ultimately saw three other candidates enter the race for the Republican nomination. O'Connor prevailed by a wide margin in the primary, taking 55% in the four-person contest. He went on to win the general election with 62% of the vote.

He took office in January 2023.

Following redistricting, O'Connor ran for re-election in the new 60th district, which was effectively renumbered from the old 52nd district. He won against his 2022 opponent, Joe Lavrenz, by a 21-point margin.

== Personal life and family ==
Jerry O'Connor has six brothers. He has been married twice. He married his high school sweetheart, Amy Lansdowne, on August 26, 1972, in Madison, Wisconsin. They had two daughters together and were married for nearly 43 years before she died of cancer in May 2015. He subsequently married Luanne Bohlman-Romuald, a widow and mother of three adult children. Jerry and Luanne reside in the city of Fond du Lac.

== Electoral history ==
=== Wisconsin Assembly, 43rd district (2022) ===
Year	Election	Date	Elected				Defeated				Total	Plurality
2022	Primary	Aug. 9	Jerry L. O'Connor	Republican	4,342	55.92%	Donald R. Hannemann	Rep.	1,292	16.64%	7,764	3,050
2022	Primary	Aug. 9	Jerry L. O'Connor	Republican	4,342	55.92%	Lawrence Foster	Rep.	1,192	15.35%	7,764	3,050
2022	Primary	Aug. 9	Jerry L. O'Connor	Republican	4,342	55.92%	Robert P. Thresher	Rep.	929	11.97%	7,764	3,050
2022	General	Nov. 8	Jerry L. O'Connor	Republican	15,055	62.26%	Joe Lavrenz	Dem.	9,108	37.67%	24,179	5,947

=== Wisconsin Assembly, 60th district (2024) ===
Year	Election	Date	Elected				Defeated				Total	Plurality
2024	General	Nov. 5	Jerry L. O'Connor	Republican	17,283	60.11%	Joe Lavrenz	Dem.	11,453	39.84%	28,751	5,830

Wisconsin State Assembly
Preceded by Jeremy Thiesfeldt	Member of the Wisconsin State Assembly from the 52nd district January 3, 2023 – January 6, 2025	Succeeded by Lee Snodgrass
Preceded by Robert Brooks	Member of the Wisconsin State Assembly from the 60th district January 6, 2025 – present	Incumbent
