= Mel J. Cyrak =

20th century American politician

Mel Cyrak

Member of the Wisconsin State Assembly from the 81st district
- In office January 1, 1973 – January 6, 1975
- Preceded by: Position established
- Succeeded by: Thomas S. Hanson

Personal details
- Born: October 23, 1936 (age 89) Milwaukee, Wisconsin, U.S.
- Party: Republican
- Education: University of Wisconsin–Whitewater (B.B.A.); University of Wisconsin Law School (J.D.)
- Occupation: lawyer

Mel J. Cyrak (born October 23, 1936) is a retired American lawyer and Republican politician. He served one term in the Wisconsin State Assembly, representing the 81st Assembly district.

== Biography ==
Born in Milwaukee, Wisconsin, Cyrak received his primary education in Wauwatosa, Wisconsin, and worked for several years as a truck driver and factory worker before entering college at age 29. He completed his bachelor's in business administration at the University of Wisconsin–Whitewater in 1969 and immediately entered the University of Wisconsin Law School and earned his J.D. in 1972. That same year, he was elected to the Wisconsin State Assembly, running on the Republican ticket. He lost his race for re-election in 1974.

After losing re-election, Cyrak focused on his law practice and subsequently moved to Dallas, Texas. In 1996 his law license was suspended for sixty days for professional misconduct.

Wisconsin State Assembly
New district created	Member of the Wisconsin State Assembly from the 81st district January 1, 1973 – January 6, 1975	Succeeded by Thomas S. Hanson
