= Robert Brooks (Wisconsin politician) =

21st century American politician

Member of the Wisconsin State Assembly
- Incumbent
- Assumed office January 6, 2025
- Preceded by: Ty Bodden
- Constituency: 59th district
- In office January 5, 2015 – January 6, 2025
- Preceded by: Duey Stroebel
- Succeeded by: Jerry L. O'Connor
- Constituency: 60th district

Chairman of the Board of Supervisors of Ozaukee County, Wisconsin
- In office April 2004 – April 2013
- Preceded by: Gustav W. Wirth Jr.
- Succeeded by: Lee Schlenvogt

Personal details
- Born: July 13, 1965 (age 61) Rockford, Illinois, U.S.
- Party: Republican
- Spouse: Dawn
- Children: 2
- Education: University of Wisconsin–La Crosse
- Website: Official website; Campaign website

Robert Brooks (born July 13, 1965) is an American businessman and Republican politician from Ozaukee County, Wisconsin. He is a member of the Wisconsin State Assembly, representing Wisconsin's 59th Assembly district since 2025; he previously represented the 60th Assembly district from 2015 to 2025. Earlier in his career, he served on the board of supervisors of Ozaukee County, and was chairman of the board of supervisors from 2004 to 2013.

== Biography ==
Born in Rockford, Illinois, Brooks moved with his parents to Wisconsin and graduated from Parkview High School in Orfordville, Wisconsin. He went on to attend the University of Wisconsin–La Crosse, but did not graduate. He went to work in the real estate business, and owned a number of restaurants, taverns, and rental properties. Since 1996, he has managed his real estate through Brooks Investment Group LLC.

== Political career ==
From 2002 through 2014, Brooks was an elected member of the Ozaukee County Board of Supervisors; he was chairman from 2004 through 2013. While serving on the county board, he was a commissioner on the South Eastern Wisconsin Regional Planning Commission and was a member of the board of directors of the Wisconsin Mutual Insurance Company.

In 2014, incumbent State Representative Duey Stroebel announced he would run for United States House of Representatives rather than seek another term in the Assembly. Brooks jumped into the race for the open seat in the Wisconsin State Assembly. In the Republican primary, he defeated Jean Opitz, the wife of former State Representative David W. Opitz. He was unopposed in the general election, and went on to begin his term in January 2015. He went on to win reelection in 2016 by a wide margin, with only an independent opponent.

In the 2017–2018 session of the Assembly, Brooks was elected by his caucus as the assistant majority leader. However, he ran into problems in 2018 when the Milwaukee Journal Sentinel reported that Brooks had made "sexual comments to two female state lawmakers and a racial remark to a Latina legislator". Brooks attributed the comments to the influence of alcohol, apologized, and resigned his leadership position in the assembly. Republican Governor Scott Walker, in the middle of his own reelection campaign, called for Brooks to resign from the Assembly. Despite the pressure from inside his own party, Brooks resisted calls to resign and was reelected in the 2018 general election.

He faced his first primary challenge as an incumbent in 2020, but Brooks prevailed again, taking 75% of the Republican primary vote. He was again unopposed in the 2020 general election.

== Electoral history ==
=== Wisconsin Assembly, 60th district (2014–2022) ===
Year	Election	Date	Elected				Defeated				Total	Plurality
2014	Primary	Aug. 12	Robert Brooks	Republican	4,791	58.03%	Jean F. Opitz	Rep.	3,457	41.87%	8,256	1,334
2014	General	Nov. 4	Robert Brooks	Republican	24,066	98.93%	Perry Duman (write-in)	Dem.	5	0.02%	24,326	23,811
2016	General	Nov. 8	Robert Brooks (inc.)	Republican	23,806	74.87%	David Pelikan	Ind.	7,895	24.83%	31,798	15,911
2018	General	Nov. 6	Robert Brooks (inc.)	Republican	20,702	64.86%	Chris Rahlf	Dem.	11,182	35.03%	31,920	9,520
2020	Primary	Aug. 11	Robert Brooks (inc.)	Republican	6,958	75.99%	Chris Reimer	Rep.	2,198	24.01%	9,156	4,760
2020	General	Nov. 3	Robert Brooks (inc.)	Republican	28,853	96.77%	--unopposed--				29,817	27,889
2022	Primary	Aug. 9	Robert Brooks (inc.)	Republican	9,064	80.55%	Samuel Krieg	Rep.	2,179	19.36%	11,253	6,885
2022	General	Nov. 8	Robert Brooks (inc.)	Republican	21,396	64.72%	Daniel E. Larsen	Dem.	11,636	35.20%	33,061	9,760

=== Wisconsin Assembly, 59th district (2024) ===
Year	Election	Date	Elected				Defeated				Total	Plurality
2024	General	Nov. 5	Robert Brooks	Republican	29,315	75.71%	Jack Holzman	Dem.	9,369	24.20%	38,719	19,946

Wisconsin State Assembly
Preceded by Duey Stroebel	Member of the Wisconsin State Assembly from the 60th district January 5, 2015 – January 6, 2025	Succeeded by Jerry L. O'Connor
Preceded by Ty Bodden	Member of the Wisconsin State Assembly from the 59th district January 6, 2025 – present	Incumbent
Political offices
Preceded by Gustav W. Wirth Jr.	Chairman of the Board of Supervisors of Ozaukee County, Wisconsin; April 2004 – April 2013	Succeeded by Lee Schlenvogt
