= Timothy Ramthun =

21st century American politician

Member of the Wisconsin State Assembly from the 59th district
- In office January 7, 2019 – January 2, 2023
- Preceded by: Jesse Kremer
- Succeeded by: Ty Bodden

Personal details
- Born: March 13, 1957 (age 69) Kewaskum, Wisconsin, U.S.
- Party: Republican
- Spouse: Carolann
- Children: 2
- Website: Official website

Timothy S. Ramthun (born March 13, 1957) is an American consultant and politician from Fond du Lac County, Wisconsin. He was a member of the Wisconsin State Assembly from 2019 through 2022, representing the 59th Assembly district, and was an unsuccessful candidate for governor of Wisconsin in the 2022 Republican primary. He has been a vocal supporter of Donald Trump's attempts to overturn the results of the 2020 United States presidential election in Wisconsin.

== Background ==
Ramthun was born and raised in Kewaskum, Wisconsin. Ramthun was elected to the Kewaskum Board of Education and served as President of the board for two years.

== Political office ==
His first attempt at election to the Wisconsin State Assembly was in 2014, when he ran in the Republican primary to replace Daniel LeMahieu, but was defeated by Jesse Kremer. Four years later, in 2018, Kremer chose not to run for re-election and Ramthun again entered the Republican primary. This time he prevailed over the Republican field and went on to win the general election without opposition.

Ramthun ran in the Republican Party primary for the 2022 Wisconsin gubernatorial election against Tim Michels, former lieutenant governor Rebecca Kleefisch, Kevin Nicholson and Adam J. Fisher. Michels won the primary, while Ramthun received only six-percent of the vote.

In 2024, Ramthun ran for Wisconsin Senate, launching a primary challenge against state senator Dan Feyen in the 20th Senate district. Feyen won the nomination by a wide margin; Ramthun received 35% of the vote.

=== 2020 presidential election ===
After Joe Biden won the 2020 presidential election and Donald Trump refused to concede while making false claims of fraud, Ramthun solicited private donations to conduct an audit of the presidential election results in Wisconsin. Ramthun released a video that he titled, "The Calm Before the Storm", a phrase used in association with QAnon, a conspiracy theory that contends the U.S. government is controlled by a cabal of Satanist pedophiles. Ramthun in November 2021 introduced a joint resolution in which the legislature would rescind certification of the 2020 election results and "reclaim" Wisconsin's electoral votes. The motion was praised by Trump (who urged a member of the State Senate to co-sponsor the motion), but condemned nationally. Assembly Majority Leader Jim Steineke, a fellow Republican, said the Assembly would not act on the resolution, since the attorneys of the nonpartisan Wisconsin Legislative Council agreed that there is no way in the law to do such a thing and Assembly Speaker Robin Vos (also a Republican) rejecting the idea as a "talking point of the far left and far right."

Wisconsin State Assembly
Preceded by Jesse Kremer	Member of the Wisconsin State Assembly from the 59th district January 7, 2019 – January 2, 2023	Succeeded by Ty Bodden
