= Wisconsin's 60th Assembly district =

American legislative district in east-central Wisconsin

Wisconsin's 60th State Assembly district
- 2024 map defined in 2023 Wisc. Act 94; 2022 map defined in Johnson v. Wisconsin Elections Commission; 2011 map was defined in 2011 Wisc. Act 43
Assemblymember
Jerry L. O'Connor; R–Fond du Lac
since January 6, 2025 (1 years)
- Demographics: 85.47% White; 3.59% Black; 6.74% Hispanic; 1.9% Asian; 2.07% Native American; 0.12% Hawaiian/Pacific Islander
- Population (2020) • Voting age: 59,265; 46,670
- Website: Official website
- Notes: Fond du Lac, Wisconsin

The 60th Assembly district of Wisconsin is one of 99 districts in the Wisconsin State Assembly. Located in Eastern Wisconsin, the district comprises part of central Fond du Lac County, including the city of Fond du Lac and the village of North Fond du Lac. The district also contains Marian University, the University of Wisconsin–Oshkosh, Fond du Lac Campus, Taycheedah Correctional Institution, and the Fond du Lac County Airport. The district is represented by Republican Jerry L. O'Connor, since January 2025; O'Connor previously represented the 52nd district from 2023 to 2025.

The 60th Assembly district is located within Wisconsin's 20th Senate district, along with the 58th and 59th Assembly districts.

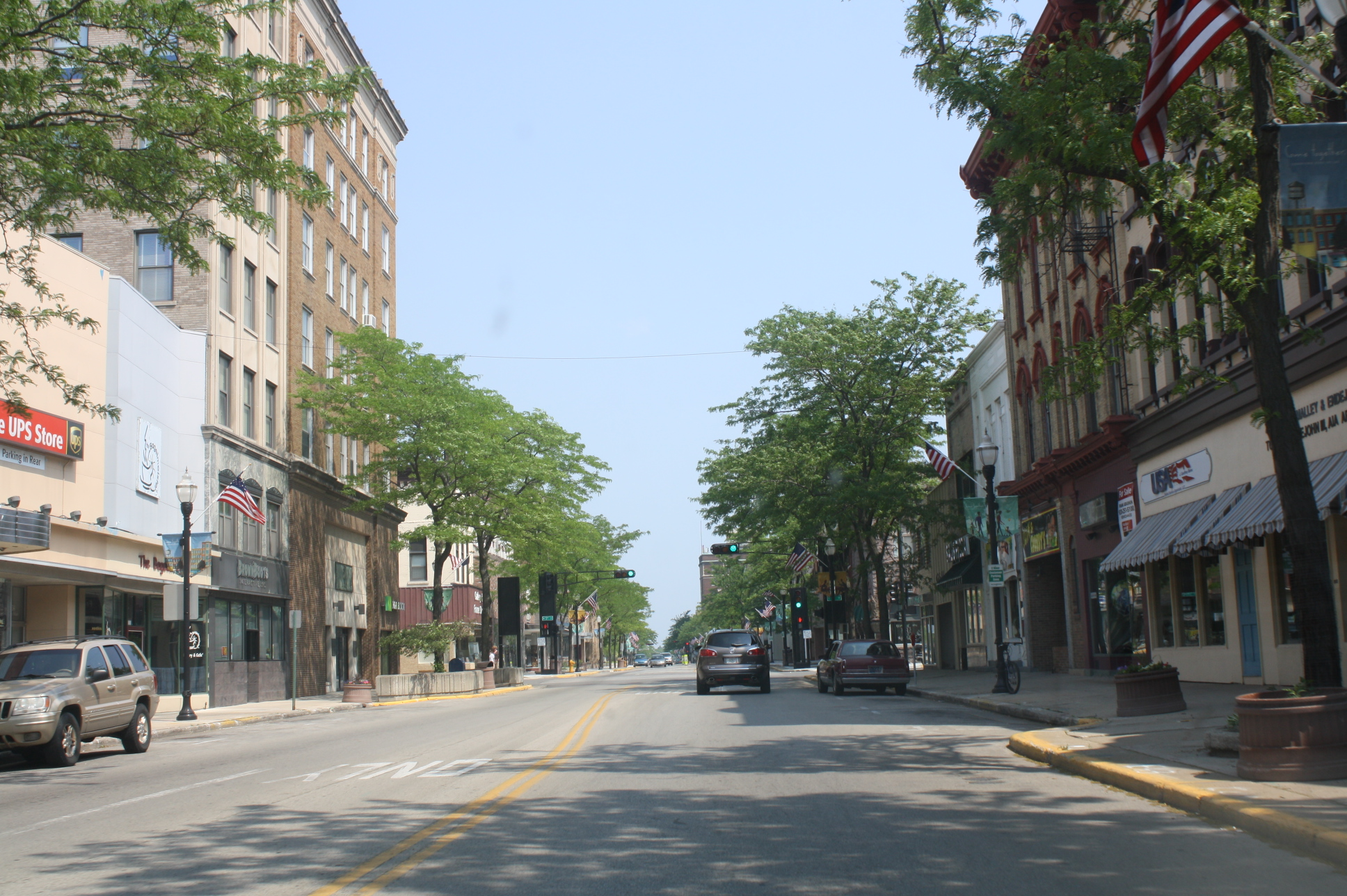
South Main Street Historic District in Fond du Lac

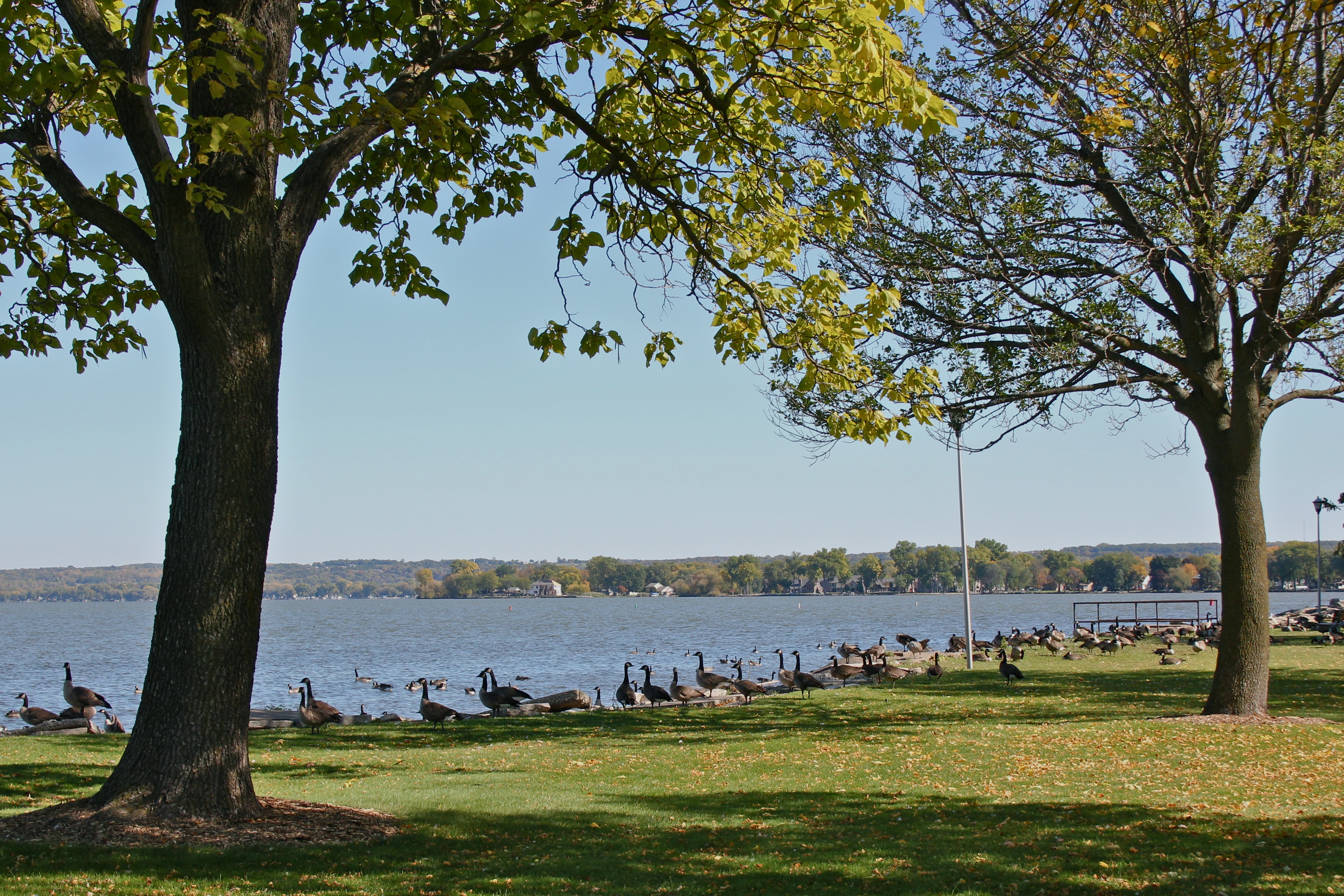
Lakeside Park on the south shore of Lake Winnebago

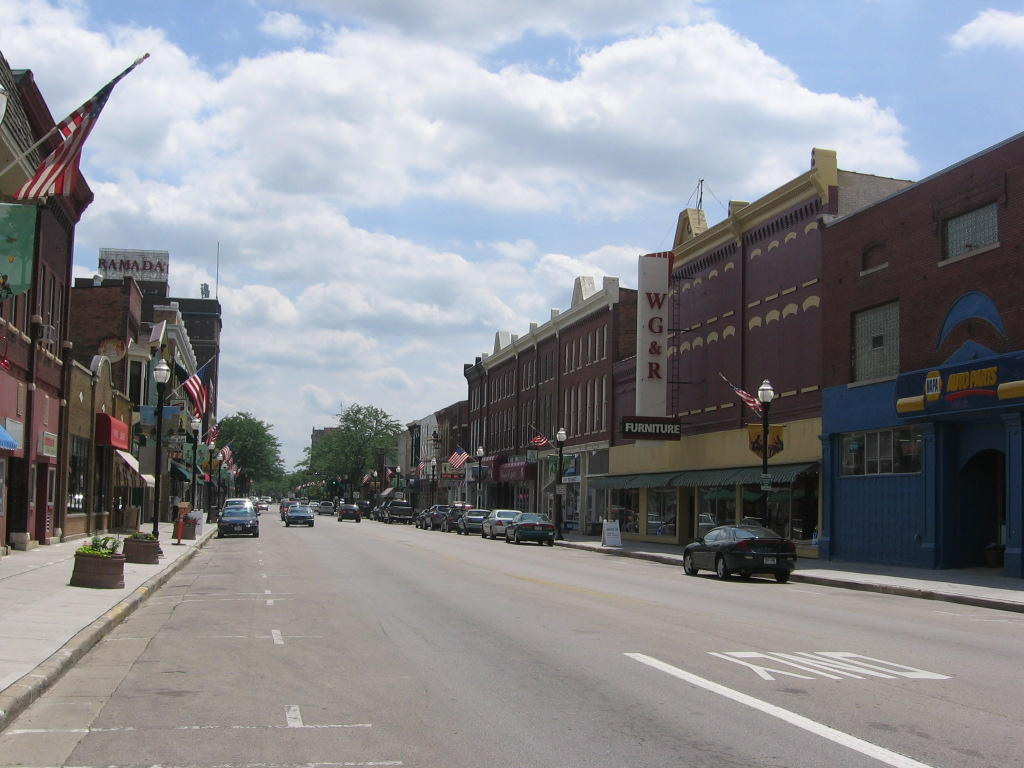
North Main Street Historic District in Fond du Lac

== List of past representatives ==
List of representatives to the Wisconsin State Assembly from the 60th district
Member	Party	Residence	Counties represented	Term start	Term end	Ref.
District created
David W. Opitz	Rep.	Port Washington	Ozaukee, Sheboygan	January 1, 1973	April 17, 1979	
--Vacant--			Ozaukee, Sheboygan	April 17, 1979	July 24, 1979	
Donald K. Stitt	Rep.	Port Washington	Ozaukee, Sheboygan	July 24, 1979	January 3, 1983	
Donald W. Hasenohrl	Dem.	Richfield	Portage, Wood	January 3, 1983	January 7, 1985	
Susan Bowers Vergeront	Rep.	Cedarburg	Ozaukee, Sheboygan	January 7, 1985	January 2, 1995	
Timothy Hoven	Rep.	Port Washington	Ozaukee	January 2, 1995	August 1, 2002	
--Vacant--			Ozaukee	August 1, 2002	January 5, 2003	
Mark Gottlieb	Rep.	Cedarburg	Ozaukee, Washington	January 5, 2003	January 3, 2011	
--Vacant--			Ozaukee, Washington	January 3, 2011	May 17, 2011	
Duey Stroebel	Rep.	Cedarburg	Ozaukee, Washington	May 17, 2011	January 5, 2015	
Robert Brooks	Rep.	Saukville	Ozaukee, Washington	January 5, 2015	January 6, 2025	
Jerry L. O'Connor	Rep.	Fond du Lac	Fond du Lac	January 6, 2025	Current	
Marty Ryan	Rep.		Fond du Lac	January 4, 2027	Member-elect	
