= Mike Bare =

21st century American politician (born 1983)

Member of the Wisconsin State Assembly from the 80th district
- Incumbent
- Assumed office January 3, 2023
- Preceded by: Sondy Pope

Member of the Board of Supervisors of Dane County, Wisconsin, from the 32nd district
- In office April 2020 – August 18, 2023
- Preceded by: Jason Knoll
- Succeeded by: Chad Kemp

Personal details
- Born: March 1983 (age 43) Manitowoc, Wisconsin, U.S.
- Party: Democratic
- Spouse: Tristan S. Breedlove
- Children: 2
- Education: American University (BA, MA)
- Website: Campaign website

Michael Andrew "Mike" Bare (born March 1983) is an American policy analyst and Democratic politician from Verona, Wisconsin. He is a member of the Wisconsin State Assembly, representing Wisconsin's 80th Assembly district since 2023. He previously served as a member of the Dane County board of supervisors and, earlier in his career, served as a legislative aide to United States senator Russ Feingold.

== Biography ==
Mike Bare was born and raised in Manitowoc, Wisconsin. He graduated from Manitowoc's Lincoln High School in 2001 and went on to attend American University in Washington, D.C. He earned his bachelor's degree from American in 2006 and went on to earn his master's degree in 2010.

Since 2013, he has been employed as research director and program coordinator for Community Advocates Public Policy Institute. The institute deals with researching existing and proposed legislation and designing model policy for alleviating and preventing poverty. Bare played a significant role in his organization's recommendations for Affordable Care Act implementation in Wisconsin.

In 2016, he was a partner in a bid to construct and maintain a German-style beer garden in Madison's Olbrich Park. Their proposal was ultimately approved, and Bare is now co-owner of the Olbrich biergarten.

== Political career ==
Bare first became involved in politics during his undergraduate years. While still a student, he was hired to work as a field organizer on John Kerry's 2004 presidential campaign. After the election, he went to work for United States senator Russ Feingold as a legislative clerk and joined Feingold's re-election campaign as research director in 2010. In 2013, he was appointed to the Verona city council to fill a vacancy, but was not elected to a full term in 2014.

In 2013, Bare was also one of the co-founders of the Wisconsin chapter of the New Leaders Council, which seeks to recruit and train young progressive leaders. He served as director of the Wisconsin chapter for some time and was also chair of the organization's national programs committee.

In the Spring election of 2020, he was elected to the Dane County board of supervisors, running unopposed in an open seat. He was re-elected without opposition in 2022.

Just after the Spring 2022 election, incumbent state representative Sondy Pope announced she would retire after 20 years in the Assembly. Bare announced his candidacy for the Democratic nomination and faced four opponents in the primary in the heavily democratic 80th Assembly district. Despite Pope endorsing Verona attorney and city councilmember Chad Kemp, Bare went on to win the primary with nearly 48% of the vote. He easily prevailed in the general election over Verona Republican Jacob Luginbuhl. He was sworn in at the start of the 106th Wisconsin Legislature.

== Personal life and family ==
Mike Bare is married to Madison attorney Tristan Breedlove, a public defender and a professor at the University of Wisconsin Law School. They have two young children and reside in Verona, Wisconsin.

== Electoral history ==
=== Wisconsin Assembly (2022–present) ===
Year	Election	Date	Elected				Defeated				Total	Plurality
2022	Primary	Aug. 9	Mike Bare	Democratic	4,921	47.68%	Anna Halverson	Dem.	2,802	27.15%	10,321	2,119
2022	Primary	Aug. 9	Mike Bare	Democratic	4,921	47.68%	Chad Kemp	Dem.	2,003	19.41%	10,321	2,119
2022	Primary	Aug. 9	Mike Bare	Democratic	4,921	47.68%	Dale Edward Paul Yurs	Dem.	460	4.46%	10,321	2,119
2022	Primary	Aug. 9	Mike Bare	Democratic	4,921	47.68%	Doug Steinberg	Dem.	132	1.28%	10,321	2,119
2022	General	Nov. 8	Mike Bare	Democratic	23,380	69.66%	Jacob D. Luginbuhl	Rep.	10,156	30.26%	33,563	13,224
2024	Primary	Aug. 13	Mike Bare (inc)	Democratic	12,169	78.31%	Nasra Wehelie	Dem.	3,357	21.60%	15,540	8,812
2024	General	Nov. 5	Mike Bare (inc)	Democratic	30,593	73.42%	Robert Relph	Rep.	11,038	26.49%	41,667	19,555

Wisconsin State Assembly
Preceded by Sondy Pope	Member of the Wisconsin State Assembly from the 80th district January 3, 2023 – present	Incumbent
