= Wisconsin's 81st Assembly district =

American legislative district in Dane County, Wisconsin

Wisconsin's 81st State Assembly district
- 2024 map defined in 2023 Wisc. Act 94; 2022 map defined in Johnson v. Wisconsin Elections Commission; 2011 map was defined in 2011 Wisc. Act 43
Assemblymember
| Alex Joers; D–Westport |
since January 6, 2025 (1 years)
- Demographics: 87.09% White; 3.02% Black; 3.99% Hispanic; 4.16% Asian; 1.15% Native American; 0.09% Hawaiian/Pacific Islander
- Population (2020) • Voting age: 60,040; 46,678
- Website: Official website
- Notes: Madison metro-area (northwest)

The 81st Assembly district of Wisconsin is one of 99 districts in the Wisconsin State Assembly. Located in south-central Wisconsin, the district comprises the northwest corner of Dane County, including northwestern suburban and exurban Madison. It includes the city of Middleton and the villages of Black Earth, Dane, Mazomanie, and Waunakee. The 81st district also contains two wards on the far north side of the city of Madison which include the Cherokee Park, Sherman Village, North Lake Mendota, Lerdahl Park and Whitetail Ridge neighborhoods. The district also contains Governor Nelson State Park, Mendota Mental Health Institute and Middleton Municipal Airport. The district has been represented by Democrat Alex Joers since January 2025; Joers previously represented the 79th district from 2023 to 2025.

The 81st Assembly district is located within Wisconsin's 27th Senate district, along with the 79th and 80th Assembly districts.

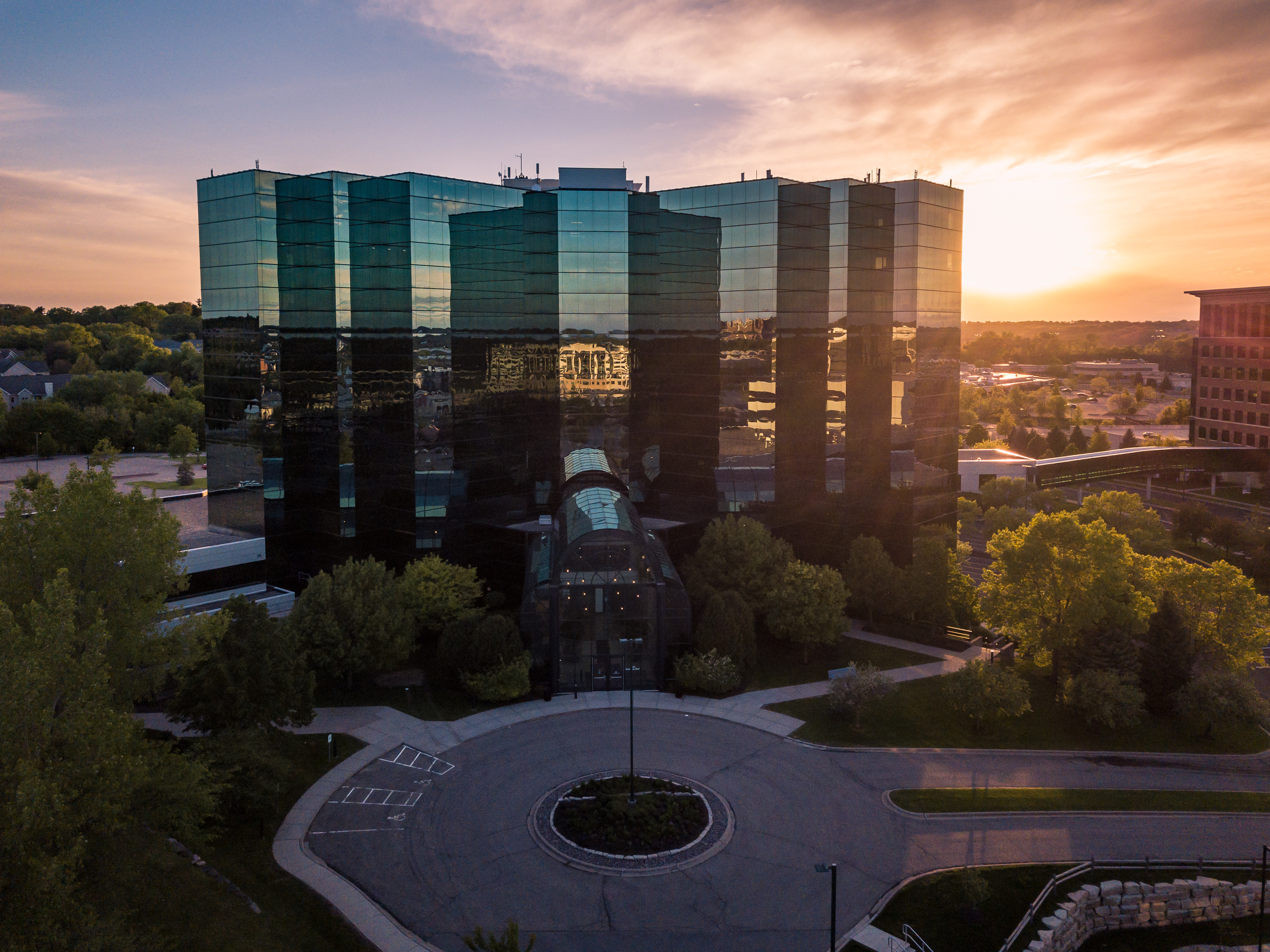
Wisconsin Trade Center in Middleton

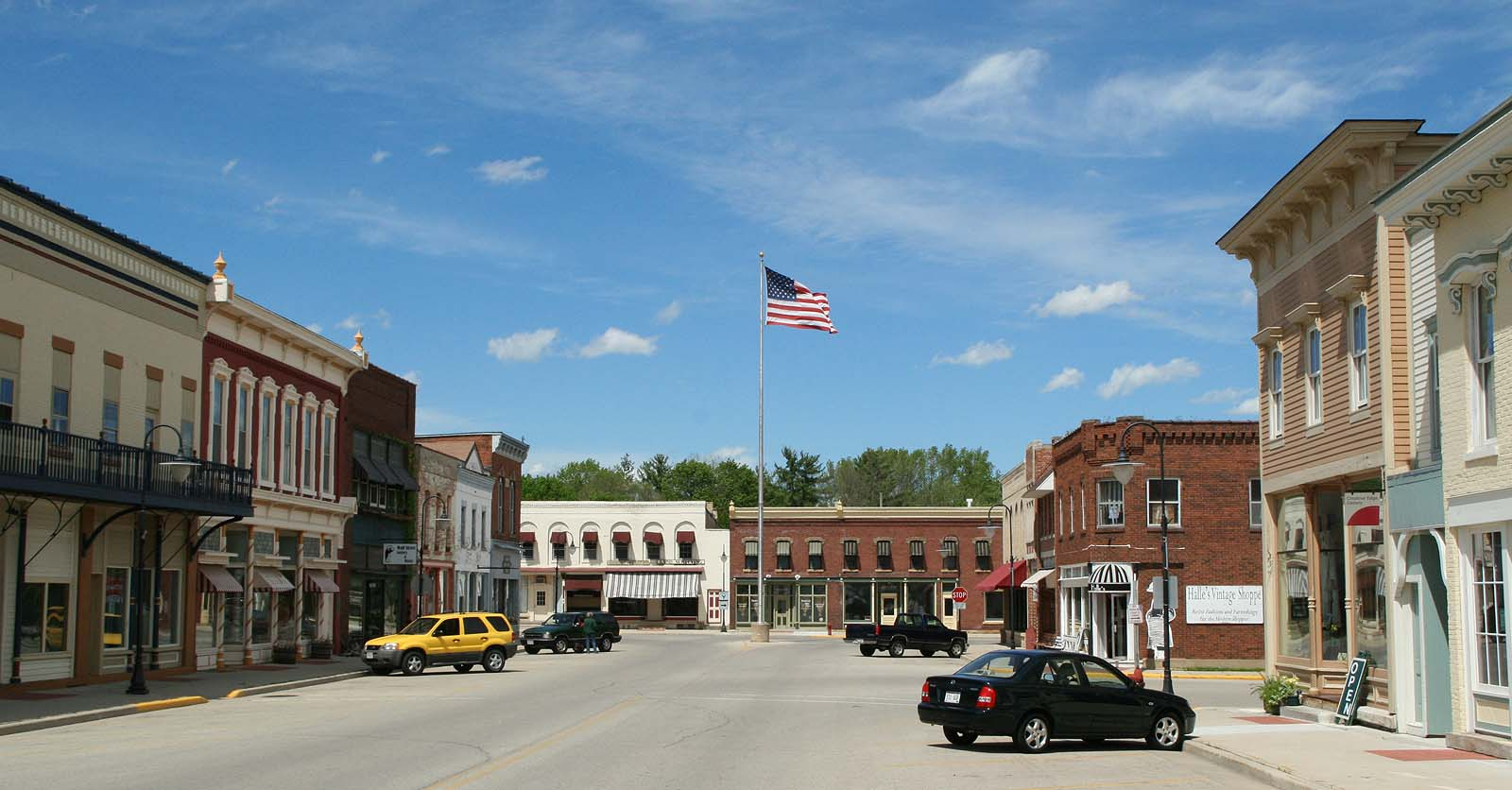
Mazomanie

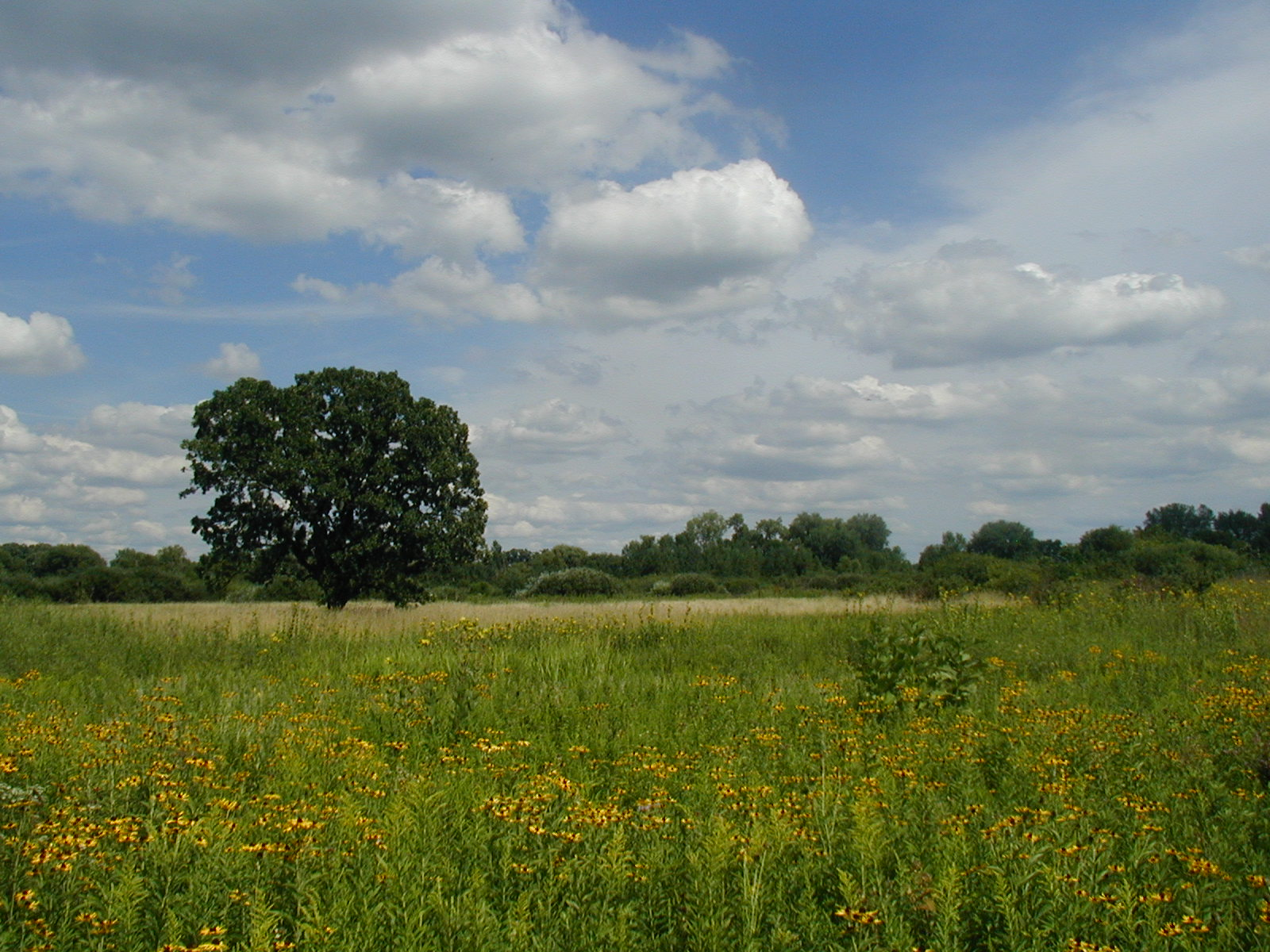
Governor Nelson State Park

== List of past representatives ==
List of representatives to the Wisconsin State Assembly from the 81st district
| Member | Party | Residence | Counties represented | Term start | Term end | Ref. |
|---|---|---|---|---|---|---|
District created
| Mel J. Cyrak | Rep. | Lake Mills | Columbia, Dodge, Jefferson | January 1, 1973 | January 6, 1975 | |
| Thomas S. Hanson | Dem. | Beaver Dam | Columbia, Dodge, Jefferson | January 6, 1975 | January 1, 1979 | |
| Randall J. Radtke | Rep. | Lake Mills | Columbia, Dodge, Jefferson | January 1, 1979 | January 3, 1983 | |
| Carol A. Buettner | Rep. | Oshkosh | Winnebago | January 3, 1983 | January 7, 1985 | |
| David Travis | Dem. | Madison | Columbia, Dane | January 7, 1985 | January 5, 2009 | |
| David Travis | Dem. | Madison | Dane | January 7, 1985 | January 5, 2009 | |
| Kelda Roys | Dem. | Madison | Dane | January 5, 2009 | January 7, 2013 | |
| Fred Clark | Dem. | Baraboo | Columbia, Dane, Iowa, Sauk | January 7, 2013 | January 5, 2015 | |
| Dave Considine | Dem. | Baraboo | Columbia, Dane, Iowa, Sauk | January 5, 2015 | January 6, 2025 | |
| Alex Joers | Dem. | Westport | Dane | January 6, 2025 | Current | |
