= Jesse Kremer =

American politician and legislator

Member of the Wisconsin State Assembly from the 59th district
- In office January 5, 2015 – January 7, 2019
- Preceded by: Daniel LeMahieu
- Succeeded by: Timothy Ramthun

Personal details
- Born: February 28, 1977 (age 49) Moline, Illinois
- Party: Republican
- Profession: Pilot, EMT, Firefighter

Jesse Kremer (born February 28, 1977) is a former American politician, pilot, emergency medical technician (EMT), and firefighter.

From Kewaskum, Wisconsin, Kremer was born in Moline, Illinois on February 28, 1977. He served in the United States Army and Wisconsin Army National Guard. In 1995, Kremer graduated from Kettle Moraine Lutheran High School. He received his A.S. in Professional Pilot Training from Fox Valley Technical College attended the Police Recruit Academy and firefighter training at Waukesha County Technical College and EMT training at Milwaukee Area Technical College. Kremer was a firefighter on the Germantown Fire Department and is still an EMT and firefighter on the Kewaskum Fire Department. He was also an airline captain at Midwest Connect Airlines. On November 4, 2014, Kremer was elected to the Wisconsin State Assembly for Assembly District 59. In 2018, Kremer did not run for re-election to the Wisconsin Assembly.

Kremer advocates Young Earth creationism, specifically that the Earth is 6,000 years old, voicing this view during a May 2017 Colleges and Universities Assembly committee hearing.
