= Dave Considine =

American educator and politician (born 1952)

David Considine

Member of the Wisconsin State Assembly from the 81st district
- In office January 5, 2015 – January 6, 2025
- Preceded by: Fred Clark
- Succeeded by: Alex Joers

Personal details
- Born: March 29, 1952 (age 74) Janesville, Wisconsin, U.S.
- Party: Democratic
- Spouse: Gretchen
- Children: 5
- Education: University of Wisconsin–Whitewater (BS); Viterbo University (MA)
- Occupation: Educator, goat farmer, politician

David "Dave" Considine (born March 29, 1952) is a retired American special education teacher and Democratic politician from Baraboo, Wisconsin. He served five terms as a member of the Wisconsin State Assembly, representing Wisconsin's 81st Assembly district from 2015 to 2025.

== Biography ==
Born in Janesville, Wisconsin, Considine grew up in North Prairie, Wisconsin, and graduated from Mukwonago High School. He received his bachelor's degree in education from University of Wisconsin–Whitewater and his masters in education from Viterbo University. He then taught school in the Baraboo School District for 29 years. On November 4, 2014, Considine was elected to the Wisconsin State Assembly and is a Democrat.

On January 31, 2024, he announced he would not run for a sixth term in the Assembly and would retire at the end of the 106th Wisconsin Legislature.

Wisconsin State Assembly
| Preceded by Fred Clark | Member of the Wisconsin State Assembly from the 81st district January 5, 2015 – January 6, 2025 | Succeeded by Alex Joers |
