= Sondy Pope =

American Democratic politician (b. 1950)

Member of the Wisconsin State Assembly
- In office January 7, 2013 – January 2, 2023
- Preceded by: Janis Ringhand
- Succeeded by: Mike Bare
- Constituency: 80th Assembly district
- In office January 6, 2003 – January 7, 2013
- Preceded by: Rick Skindrud
- Succeeded by: Dianne Hesselbein
- Constituency: 79th Assembly district

Personal details
- Born: April 27, 1950 (age 76) Madison, Wisconsin, U.S.
- Party: Democratic
- Spouse: Reed Van Gordon
- Website: Official website

Sondy M. Pope (born April 27, 1950) is a retired American nonprofit executive and Democratic politician from Dane County, Wisconsin. She served 20 years in the Wisconsin State Assembly, from 2003 through 2022. She represented the 79th Assembly district for the first 10 years, then represented the 80th district after the 2011 redistricting.

== Early life and family ==
Pope was born in Madison; she graduated from River Valley High School in Spring Green and attended Madison Area Technical College and Edgewood College. Prior to election to the Assembly, she was a staff member for the Foundation for Madison's Public Schools. She is married with one daughter.

== Legislative career ==
Pope first ran for the Assembly to represent the 79th district (western parts of Madison and Middleton, Blue Mounds, Cross Plains, Fitchburg, Mount Horeb, Springdale, Vermont, and Verona) in 2000 against Republican incumbent Rick Skindrud, but lost by 13,765 to 18,510 for Skindrud and 887 for independent Bob Menamin.

She was re-nominated in 2002, and unseated Skindrud, with a vote of 12,311 to Skindrud's 10,865. She was assigned to the standing committees on aging and long-term care; education; rural affairs; and small business.

She was re-elected in 2004, after an unsuccessful challenge in the Democratic primary election from Manamin; re-elected in 2006 (without opposition), 2008 and 2010; and as of 2011 is ranking minority member of the Assembly's standing committee on education, and a member of the committees on housing, and on children and families.

Wisconsin State Assembly
Preceded by Rick Skindrud	Member of the Wisconsin State Assembly from the 79th district January 6, 2003 – January 7, 2013	Succeeded by Dianne Hesselbein
Preceded by Janis Ringhand	Member of the Wisconsin State Assembly from the 80th district January 7, 2013 – January 2, 2023	Succeeded by Mike Bare
