= Wisconsin's 59th Assembly district =

American legislative district in eastern Wisconsin

Wisconsin's 59th State Assembly district
- 2024 map defined in 2023 Wisc. Act 94; 2022 map defined in Johnson v. Wisconsin Elections Commission; 2011 map was defined in 2011 Wisc. Act 43
Assemblymember
Robert Brooks; R–Saukville
since January 6, 2025 (1 years)
- Demographics: 94.07% White; 0.64% Black; 2.86% Hispanic; 0.83% Asian; 1.16% Native American; 0.05% Hawaiian/Pacific Islander
- Population (2020) • Voting age: 59,789; 47,368
- Website: Official website
- Notes: Eastern Wisconsin

The 59th Assembly district of Wisconsin is one of 99 districts in the Wisconsin State Assembly. Located in eastern Wisconsin, the district comprises parts of northern Washington County, northern Ozaukee County, southern Sheboygan County, northeast Dodge County, and southeast Fond du Lac County. It includes the villages of Adell, Belgium, Campbellsport, Cedar Grove, Eden, Fredonia, Kewaskum, Random Lake, Saukville, and Theresa, along with part of the city of West Bend. It also contains the University of Wisconsin–Milwaukee at Washington County campus, the West Bend campus of Moraine Park Technical College, Kettle Moraine State Forest Northern Unit, Cedarburg Bog, Harrington Beach State Park, and most of the Theresa Marsh. The district is represented by Republican Robert Brooks, since January 2025; Brooks previously represented the 60th district from 2015 to 2025.

The 59th Assembly district is located within Wisconsin's 20th Senate district, along with the 58th and 60th Assembly districts.

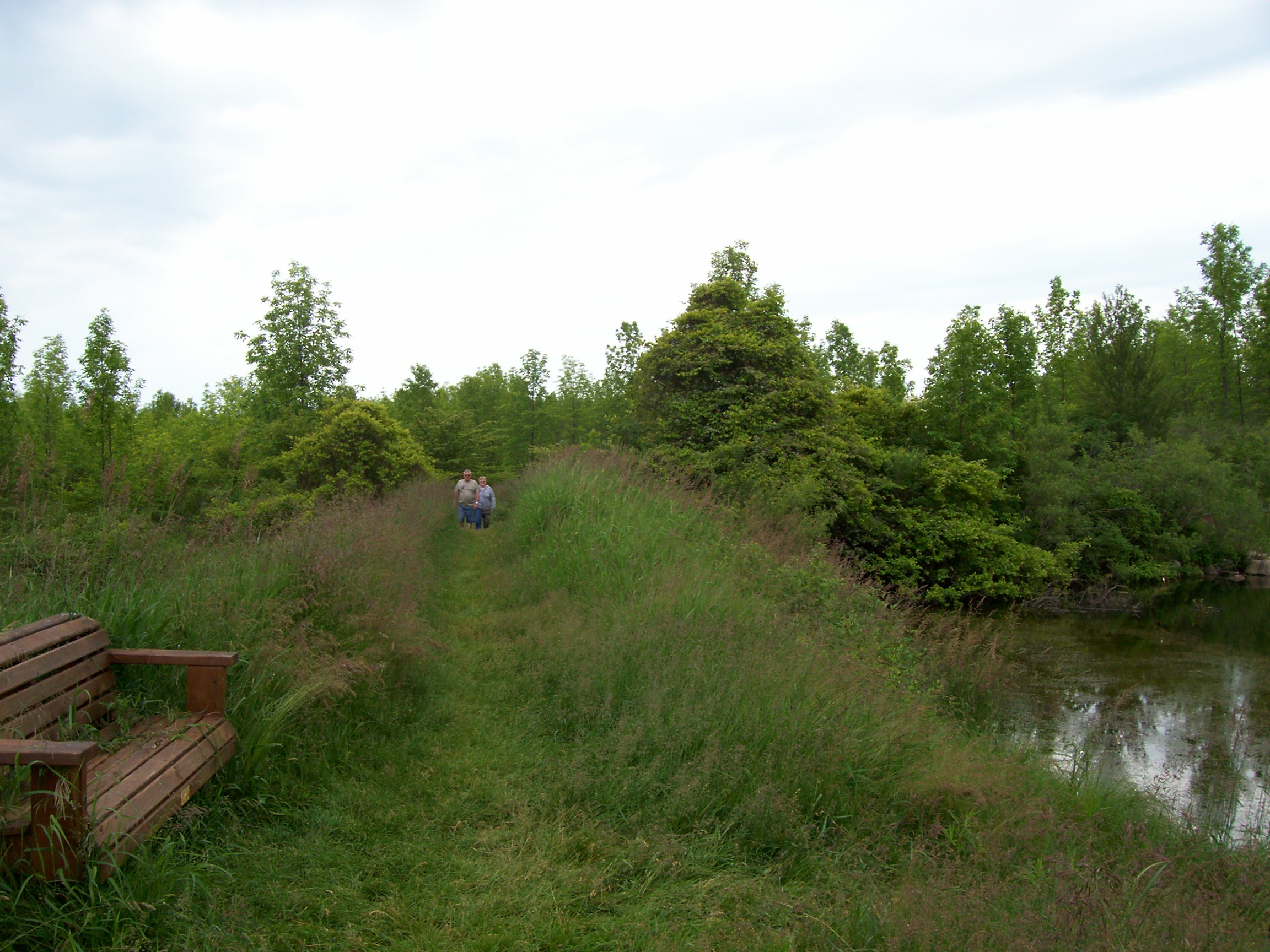
Harrington Beach State Park

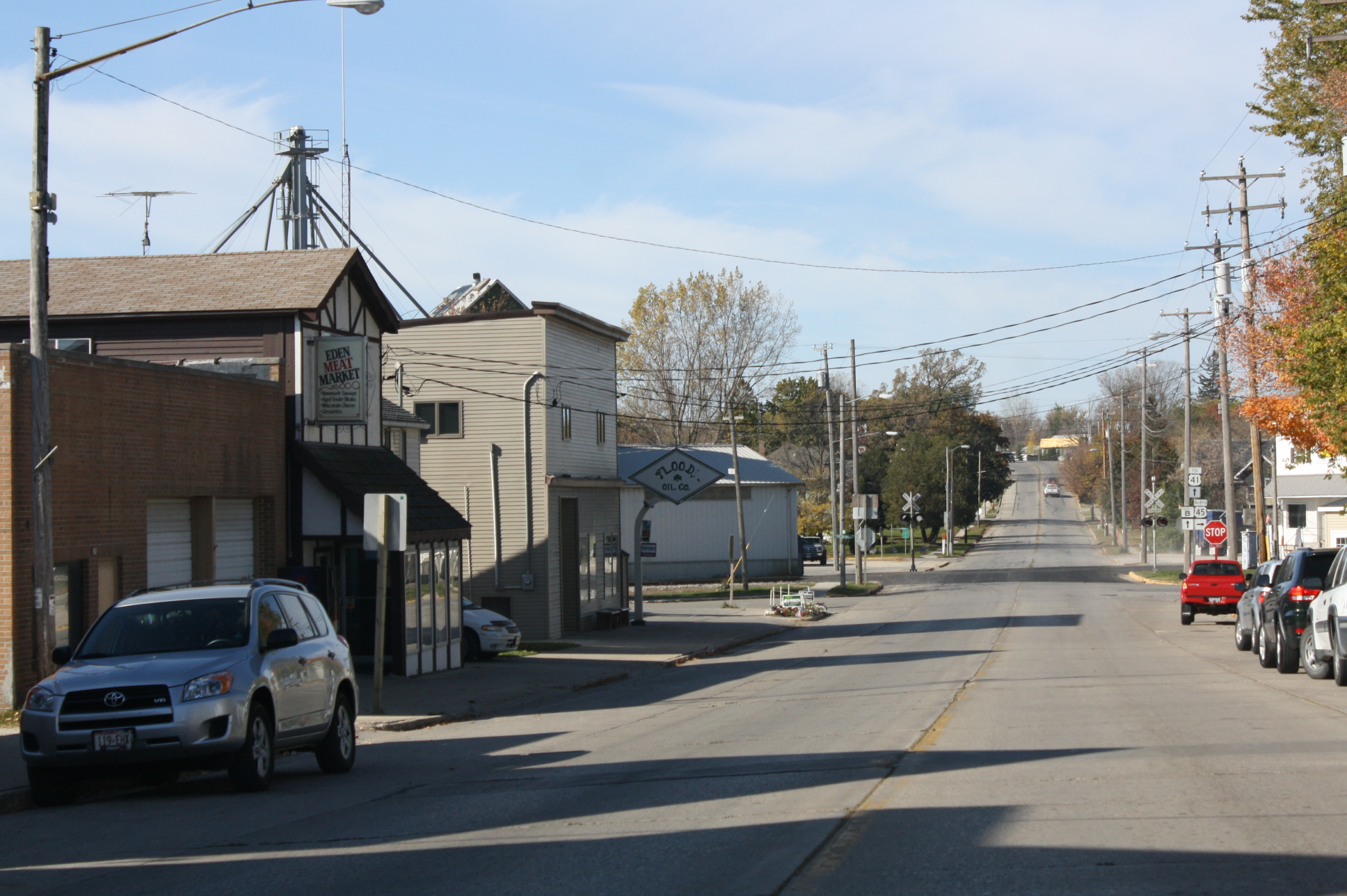
Eden

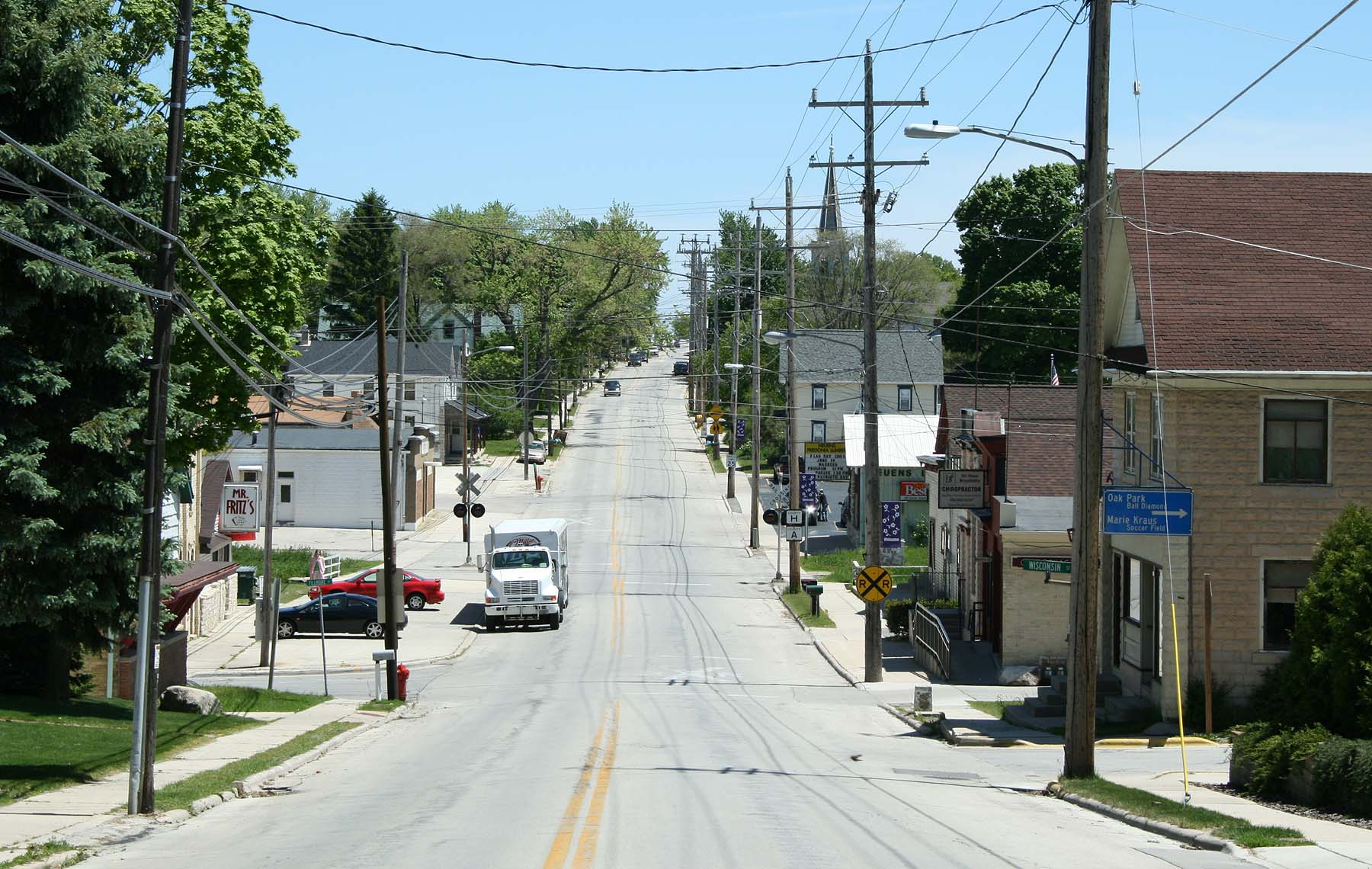
Fredonia

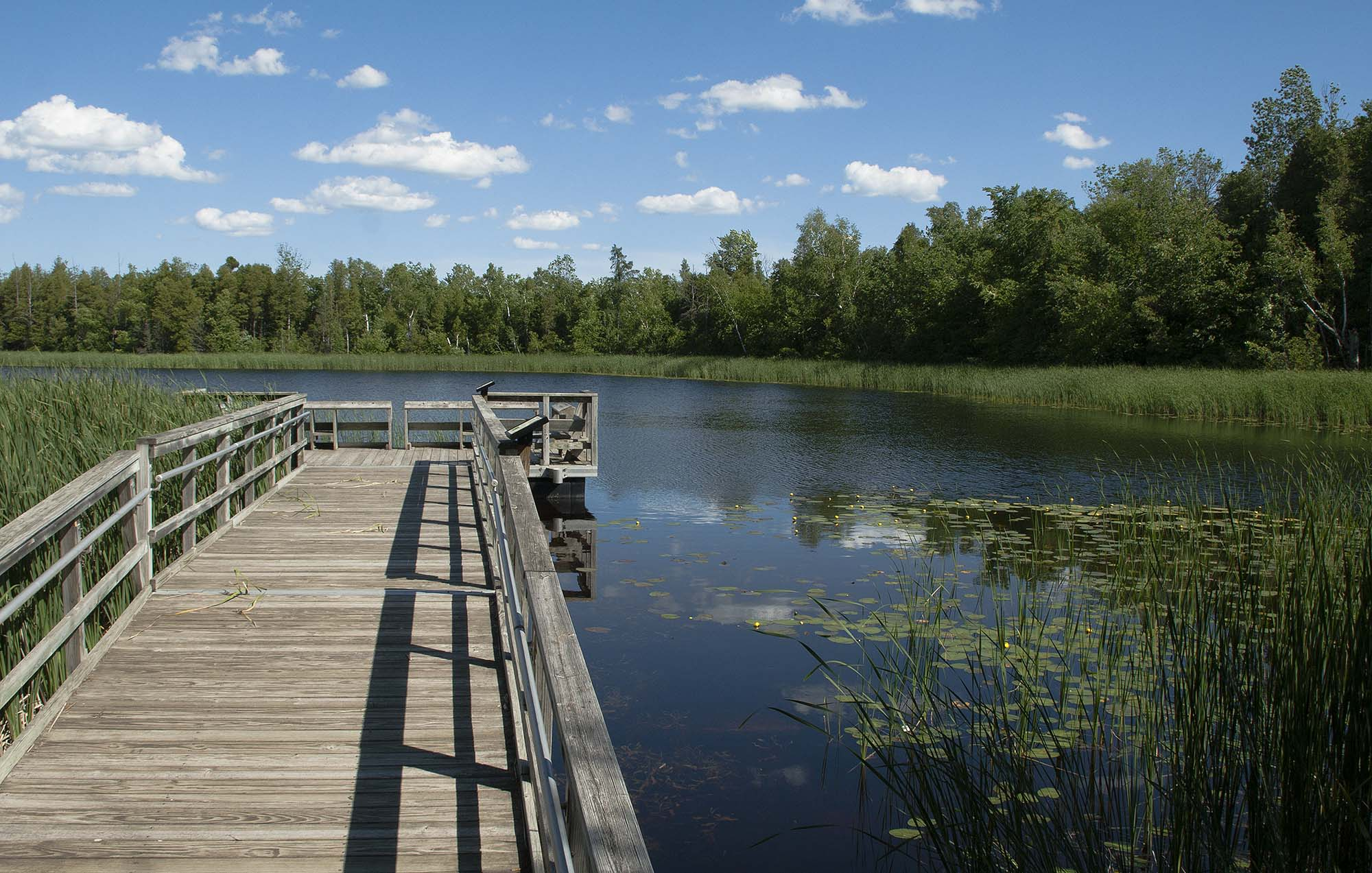
Cedarburg Bog

== List of past representatives ==
List of representatives to the Wisconsin State Assembly from the 59th district
Member	Party	Residence	Counties represented	Term start	Term end	Ref.
District created
Bill B. Bruhy	Rep.	Plymouth	Sheboygan	January 1, 1973	January 6, 1975	
Calvin Potter	Dem.	Kohler	Sheboygan	January 6, 1975	January 3, 1983	
Marlin Schneider	Dem.	Wisconsin Rapids	Portage, Wood	January 3, 1983	January 7, 1985	
Dwight A. York	Rep.	Lomira	Dodge, Fond du Lac, Washington	January 7, 1985	January 2, 1989	
Michael A. Lehman	Rep.	Hartford	Dodge, Fond du Lac, Washington	January 2, 1989	January 4, 1993	
Mary Panzer	Rep.	West Bend	Ozaukee, Sheboygan, Washington	January 4, 1993	September 30, 1993	
--Vacant--			Ozaukee, Sheboygan, Washington	September 30, 1993	December 16, 1993	
Glenn Grothman	Rep.	West Bend	Ozaukee, Sheboygan, Washington	December 16, 1993	January 5, 2003	
Daniel LeMahieu	Rep.	Lyndon	Calumet, Fond du Lac, Sheboygan, Washington	January 5, 2003	January 5, 2015	
Jesse Kremer	Rep.	Kewaskum	Calumet, Fond du Lac, Sheboygan, Washington	January 5, 2015	January 7, 2019	
Timothy Ramthun	Rep.	Campbellsport	Calumet, Fond du Lac, Sheboygan, Washington	January 7, 2019	January 2, 2023	
Ty Bodden	Rep.	Stockbridge	Calumet, Fond du Lac, Sheboygan, Washington	January 3, 2023	January 6, 2025	
Robert Brooks	Rep.	Saukville	Dodge, Fond du Lac, Ozaukee, Sheboygan, Washington	January 6, 2025	Current	
Bradley Petersen	Rep.		Dodge, Fond du Lac, Ozaukee, Sheboygan, Washington	January 4, 2027	Member-elect	
