= Wisconsin's 79th Assembly district =

American legislative district for Madison, Wisconsin

Wisconsin's 79th State Assembly district
- 2024 map defined in 2023 Wisc. Act 94; 2022 map defined in Johnson v. Wisconsin Elections Commission; 2011 map was defined in 2011 Wisc. Act 43
Assemblymember
Lisa Subeck; D–Middleton
since January 6, 2025 (1 years)
- Demographics: 72.54% White; 7.39% Black; 7.88% Hispanic; 10.68% Asian; 1.57% Native American; 0.11% Hawaiian/Pacific Islander
- Population (2020) • Voting age: 60,002; 48,827
- Website: Official website
- Notes: Madison, Wisconsin

The 79th Assembly district of Wisconsin is one of 99 districts in the Wisconsin State Assembly. Located in south-central Wisconsin, the district is entirely contained within the city of Madison, in central Dane County. The district comprises much of the west side of the city of Madison. The district is represented by Democrat Lisa Subeck, since January 2025; Subeck previously represented the 78th district from 2015 to 2025.

The 79th Assembly district is located within Wisconsin's 27th Senate district, along with the 80th and 81st Assembly districts.

== History ==
The 79th Assembly district has had a volatile history in redistricting, and has had four major changes to its composition in the seven redistricting cycles since its creation.

The district was initially drawn encompassing most of Marquette County, the southern halves of Adams and Juneau counties, and parts of northern Columbia County and northern Sauk County. The first representative of the district was Tommy Thompson, who previously represented the Adams–Juneau–Marquette district. The 1982 court-ordered redistricting moved the 79th district to the city of Appleton, Wisconsin, in Outagamie County, roughly taking the place of the 42nd Assembly district. The Legislature's 1983 redistricting act moved the district to south-central Wisconsin, comprising the southwest corner of Dane County, most of the northern quarter of Green County, and a small part of northwestern Rock County. The 1992 redistricting made only minor changes to the 1983 map, but added half of the city of Middleton, which would become an anchor for the district over the next 30 years. The 2002 map added more of Middleton and shrunk the geographic footprint of the district to a strip of western Dane County. The 2011 redistricting act shed the towns of western Dane County and shifted the district to north-central Dane County, adding the village of Waunakee. As the population of Middleton and Waunakee surged 25% and 23%, respectively, from the 2010 to 2020 census, the district shed remaining rural towns and became more concentrated around those two municipalities. The 2024 redistricting shifted the district entirely into the city of Madison.

For notable past representatives, Tommy Thompson went on to become the 42nd Governor of Wisconsin and 19th United States Secretary of Health and Human Services. David Prosser, Jr., went on to serve on the Wisconsin Supreme Court for 18 years. Joe Wineke later served as Chairman of the Democratic Party of Wisconsin.

== List of past representatives ==
List of representatives to the Wisconsin State Assembly from the 79th district
Member	Party	Residence	Counties represented	Term start	Term end	Ref.
District created
Tommy Thompson	Rep.	Elroy	Columbia, Juneau, Marquette, Sauk	January 1, 1973	January 3, 1983	
David Prosser Jr.	Rep.	Appleton	Outagamie	January 3, 1983	January 7, 1985	
Joe Wineke	Dem.	Verona	Dane, Green, Rock	January 7, 1985	April 20, 1993	
--Vacant--			Dane, Green	April 20, 1993	July 11, 1993	
Rick Skindrud	Rep.	Mount Horeb	Dane, Green	July 11, 1993	January 6, 2003	
Sondy Pope-Roberts	Dem.	Mount Horeb	Dane	January 6, 2003	January 7, 2013	
Dianne Hesselbein	Dem.	Middleton	Dane	January 7, 2013	January 2, 2023	
Alex Joers	Dem.	Middleton	Dane	January 3, 2023	January 6, 2025	
Lisa Subeck	Dem.	Madison	Dane	January 6, 2025	Current	
