= Wisconsin's 80th Assembly district =

American legislative district in Dane County, Wisconsin

Wisconsin's 80th State Assembly district
- 2024 map defined in 2023 Wisc. Act 94; 2022 map defined in Johnson v. Wisconsin Elections Commission; 2011 map was defined in 2011 Wisc. Act 43
Assemblymember
Mike Bare; D–Verona
since January 3, 2023 (3 years)
- Demographics: 81.09% White; 3.1% Black; 4.41% Hispanic; 9.9% Asian; 1.14% Native American; 0.08% Hawaiian/Pacific Islander
- Population (2020) • Voting age: 59,605; 45,798
- Website: Official website
- Notes: Madison metro-area (west)

The 80th Assembly district of Wisconsin is one of 99 districts in the Wisconsin State Assembly. Located in south-central Wisconsin, the district comprises areas of central Dane County, including neighborhoods of the far west side of the city of Madison—west of the Beltline—along with the city of Verona and the village of Cross Plains. The district is represented by Democrat Mike Bare, since January 2023.

The 80th Assembly district is located within Wisconsin's 27th Senate district, along with the 79th and 81st Assembly districts.

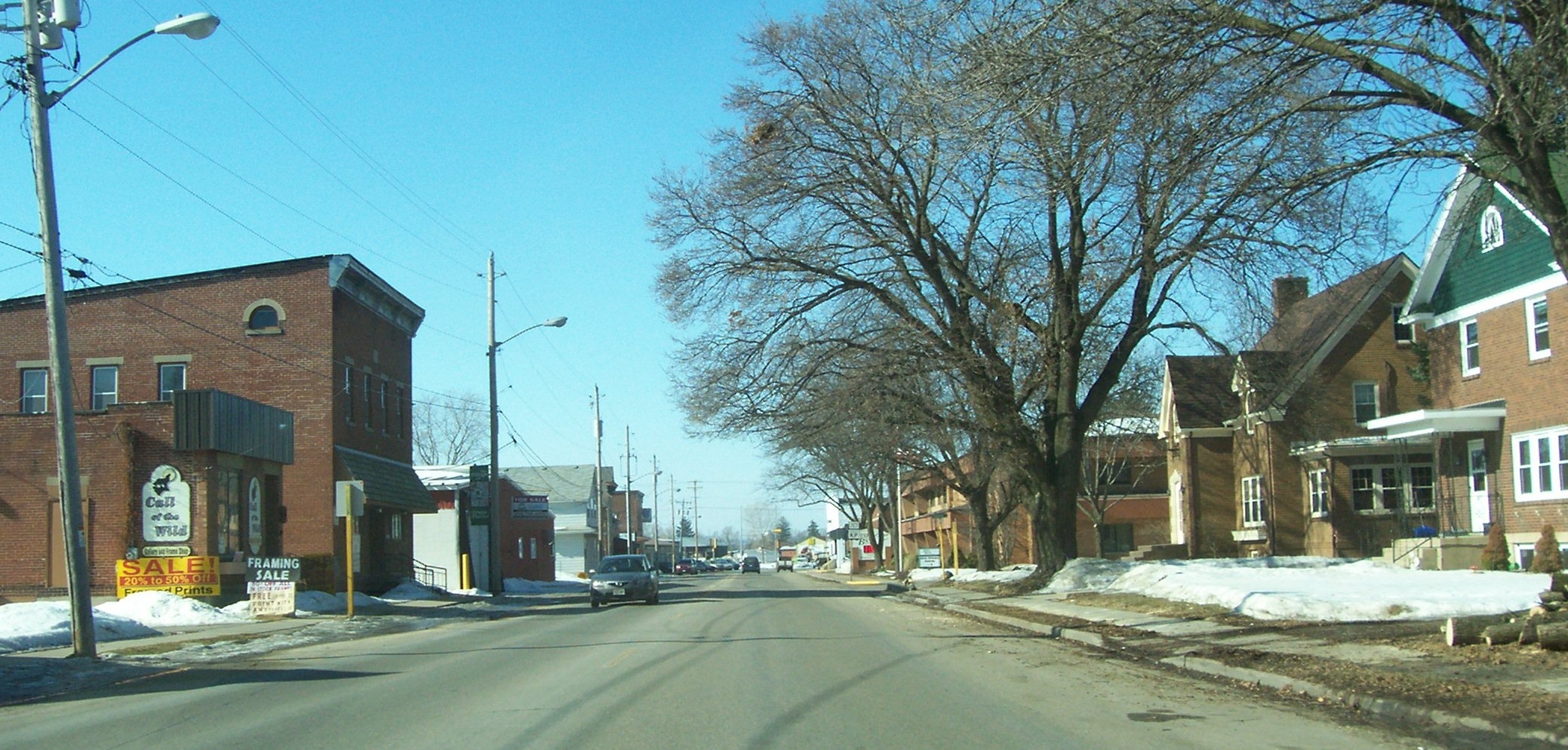
Downtown Cross Plains

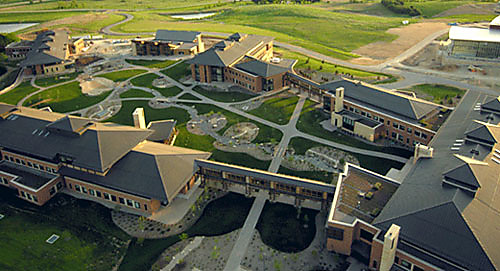
Epic Systems headquarters in Verona

== List of past representatives ==
List of representatives to the Wisconsin State Assembly from the 80th district
Member	Party	Residence	Counties represented	Term start	Term end	Ref.
District created
Kenyon E. Giese	Rep.	Sauk City	Columbia, Sauk	January 1, 1973	August 7, 1975	
--Vacant--			Columbia, Sauk	August 7, 1975	November 12, 1975	
Leroy Litscher	Dem.	Baraboo	Columbia, Sauk	November 12, 1975	January 1, 1979	
James F. Laatsch	Rep.	Arlington	Columbia, Sauk	January 1, 1979	January 3, 1983	
Esther K. Walling	Rep.	Menasha	Winnebago	January 3, 1983	January 7, 1985	
Robert M. Thompson	Dem.	Dekorra	Columbia, Dane, Dodge, Sauk	January 7, 1985	January 7, 1991	
Eugene Hahn	Rep.	Springvale	Columbia, Dane, Dodge, Sauk	January 7, 1991	January 4, 1993	
David G. Deininger	Rep.	Monroe	Green, Rock	January 4, 1993	January 2, 1995	
Mike Powers	Rep.	Albany	Green, Rock	January 2, 1995	January 3, 2005	
Brett Davis	Rep.	Evansville	Dane, Green, Lafayette, Rock	January 3, 2005	January 3, 2011	
Janis Ringhand	Dem.	Evansville	Dane, Green, Lafayette, Rock	January 3, 2011	January 7, 2013	
Sondy Pope	Dem.	Mount Horeb	Dane, Green, Iowa	January 7, 2013	January 2, 2023	
Mike Bare	Dem.	Verona	Dane, Green, Iowa	January 3, 2023	January 6, 2025	
Mike Bare	Dem.	Verona	Dane	January 6, 2025	Current	
