= Jeremy Thiesfeldt =

American politician

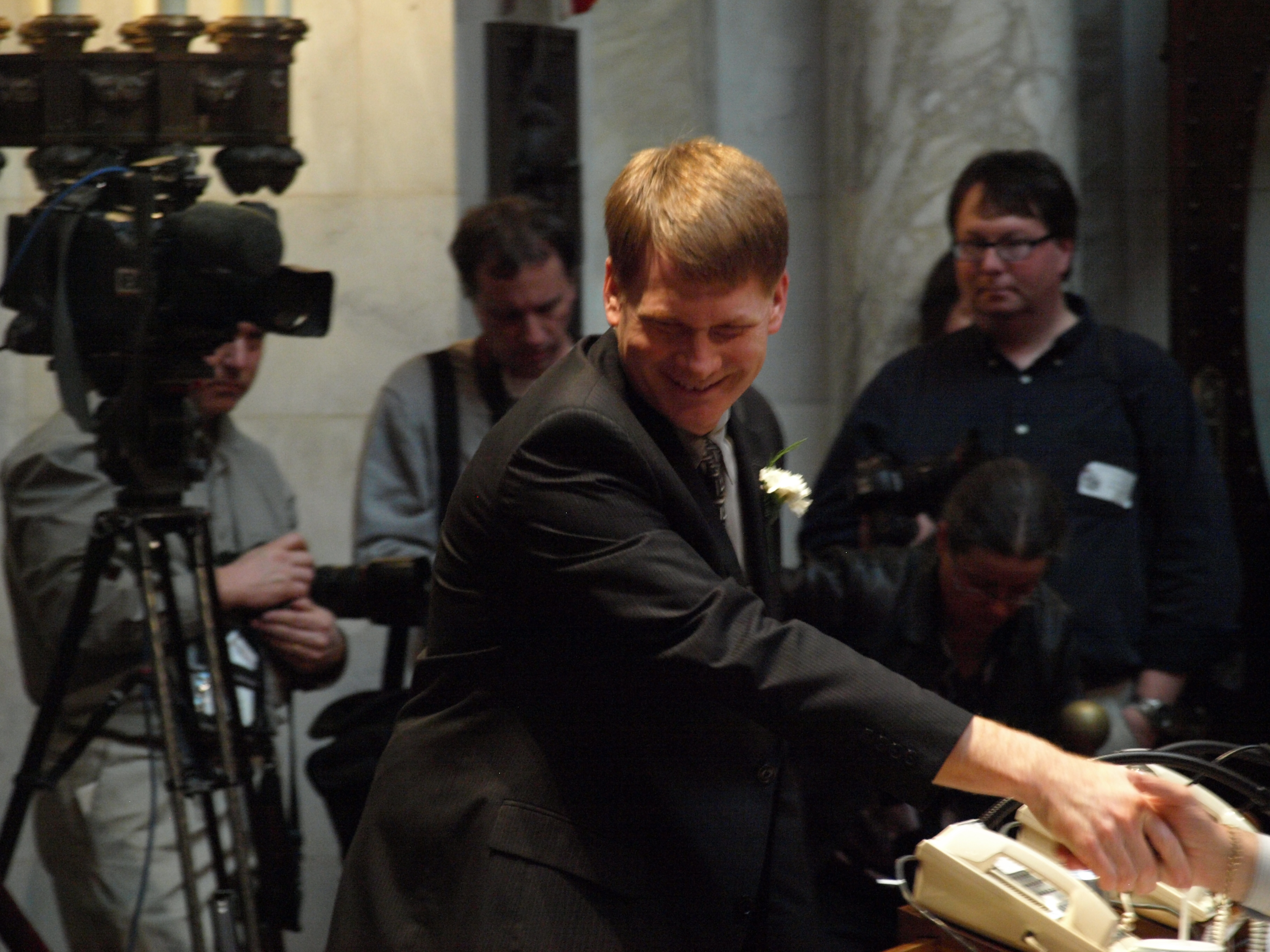
- Thiesfeldt in 2013

Member of the Wisconsin State Assembly from the 52nd district
- In office January 3, 2011 – January 2, 2023
- Preceded by: John F. Townsend
- Succeeded by: Jerry L. O'Connor

Member of the Fond du Lac City Council
- In office April 2005 – April 2010

Personal details
- Born: November 22, 1966 (age 59) Fond du Lac, Wisconsin, U.S.
- Party: Republican
- Education: Martin Luther College
- Profession: Politician
- Website: Official website

Jeremy Thiesfeldt (born November 22, 1966) is an American educator and politician from Fond du Lac, Wisconsin. He was a member of the Wisconsin State Assembly for 12 years, representing Wisconsin's 52nd Assembly district from 2011 through 2022. He also previously served on the Fond du Lac city council.

== Early life, education, and career before politics ==
Born in Fond du Lac, Wisconsin on November 22, 1966, Thiesfeldt graduated with a B.S. in elementary education from Martin Luther College in 1989.

Thiesfeldt is a former teacher, having previously taught at Winnebago Lutheran Academy. As of 2018 he was interim principal at Redeemer Lutheran School in Fond du Lac.

== Political career ==
Thiesfeldt was a member of the Fond du Lac city council from 2005 to 2010, and was first elected to the Wisconsin State Assembly in 2010 as a Republican. Thiesfeldt is the assemblyman for the 52nd Assembly District, which encompasses Fond du Lac city, Fond du Lac town, Byron, Empire, Oakfield, and Taycheedah, and Oakfield, as well as part of Calumet. He was reelected in 2012 with 60.65% of the vote, defeating Democratic nominee Paul G. Czisny; was reelected in 2014 without opposition; was reelected in 2016 with 63.76% of the vote, defeating Democratic nominee Czisny, and was reelected in 2018 with 61.63% of the vote, defeating Democratic nominee Kevin Booth. On December 9, 2021, he announced that he would not seek re-election.

=== Education ===
Thiesfeldt chairs the Assembly Education Committee, and a member of the Wisconsin Department of Public Instruction Standards Review Council, In 2012, Thiesfeldt sponsored legislation, passed by the Republican-controlled Assembly, that would allow schools to teach abstinence-only sex education, as opposed to comprehensive sex education. Thiesfeldt opposed Common Core State Standards. and in 2015 sponsored legislation allowing parents to opt-out from state standardized testing for their children. In 2019, Thiesfeldt introduced a bill in the state Assembly that would compel Wisconsin public schools and charter schools to teach cursive handwriting, at an estimated annual cost of $1.7 million to $5.95 million in student materials and some additional sum for teacher training.

In 2018, the day after 17 students and staff members were fatally shot at a high school in Florida, Thiesfeldt posted a tweet linking to an article on the on conservative website PJ Media that romanticized a past era when "high school kids rode the bus with rifles and shot their guns at high school rifle ranges." After a backlash, Thiesfeldt deleted the post, issued an apology for what he called a "poorly timed and insensitive" tweet, and said that he did not believe "that children should be able to bring guns to school."

=== Public health ===
In the Assembly, Thiesfeldt opposed legislation to repeal a provision allowing parents to send their children to school without vaccinations on grounds of "personal conviction"; Thiesfeldt asserted that the legislation would infringe on parental rights.

In August 2020, during the COVID-19 pandemic in Wisconsin, Thiesfeldt signed onto a letter from 49 Republican members of the Assembly urging schools to re-open for in-person instruction.

=== Social issues ===
Thiesfeldt opposes the legalization of marijuana, and in 2013, he and a fellow Fond du Lac Republican lawmaker, state Senator Rick Gudex, introduced a bill that would authorize county and municipal governments to prosecute marijuana possession cases that are dropped by prosecutors. Thiesfeldt and Gudex introduced the legislation after some Wisconsin district attorneys' offices adopted a policy of not pursuing criminal prosecutions for simple possession of small amounts of marijuana. Thiesfeldt states that he supports the "legitimate, regulated medical use of marijuana" and also voted for CBD oil, which he believes "has therapeutic use."

Thiesfeldt opposes legal recognition of same-sex marriage; after the Supreme Court ruled in 2015 that there was a constitutional right to same-sex unions, Thiesfeldt opposed the decision, saying that it was wrongly decided and that "marriage is a state matter."

In 2013, Thiesfeldt proposed legislation to repeal Wisconsin laws on the manufacture, use, and sale of pepper spray.

=== Economic issues ===
In 2011, Thiesfeldt proposed legislation to make Wisconsin state income taxpayers ineligible for the state's Homestead Credit if they or any household family member received any federal housing subsidy (such as a Section 8 voucher).

Thiesfeldt supports 2011 Wisconsin Act 10, which weakened public employee unions. He supported controversial state tax incentives for Foxconn's Wisconsin plant.

== Personal life ==
Thiesfeldt lives in Fond du Lac. He has been married since 1990 and has four children.

Wisconsin State Assembly
Preceded by John F. Townsend	Member of the Wisconsin State Assembly from the 52nd district January 3, 2011 – January 2, 2023	Succeeded by Jerry L. O'Connor
