= The Little Gym =

Child oriented fitness gym franchisor

The Little Gym International
- Industry: child fitness gymnastics dance cheerleading sports
- Founded: 1976
- Founder: Robin Wes
- Headquarters: Scottsdale, Arizona, U.S.
- Area served: 29 countries
- Website: TheLittleGym.com

The Little Gym International is a franchisor of infant and child oriented fitness gyms, following the guidelines set out by USA Gymnastics. It offers classes in gymnastics, dance, karate, and Kindermusic. It was founded in 1976, by educator Robin Wes.

Today, The Little Gym International is headquartered in Scottsdale, Arizona. It was incorporated in 1992 to franchise The Little Gym concept. It currently operates over 300 franchises in 29 countries throughout the world.
