= Daniel LeMahieu =

American politician and legislator (1946–2022)

Member of the Wisconsin State Assembly from the 59th district
- In office January 6, 2003 – January 5, 2015
- Preceded by: Glenn Grothman
- Succeeded by: Jesse Kremer

Chair of the Board of Supervisors of Sheboygan County, Wisconsin
- In office April 2000 – December 2002
- Preceded by: James Gilligan
- Succeeded by: Bill Goehring

Personal details
- Born: November 5, 1946 Sheboygan, Wisconsin, U.S.
- Died: February 18, 2022 (aged 75) Green Bay, Wisconsin, U.S.
- Resting place: Oostburg Cemetery, Cedar Grove, Wisconsin
- Party: Republican
- Spouse: Rosemary DeMaster (m. 1967–2022)
- Children: Douglas LeMahieu; Devin LeMahieu; Rebecca (Peterson)
- Profession: Newspaper publisher, politician

Military service
- Allegiance: United States
- Branch/service: United States Army
- Years of service: 1969–1971
- Rank: Specialist E-5

Daniel Roy LeMahieu (November 5, 1946 – February 18, 2022) was an American newspaper publisher and Republican politician from Sheboygan County, Wisconsin. He served 12 years in the Wisconsin State Assembly, representing Wisconsin's 59th Assembly district from 2003 to 2015. Before his election to the Assembly, he served 14 years on the Sheboygan County board of supervisors, and was chairman from April 2000 to December 2002. He was the publisher of the Oostburg-based Lakeshore Weekly advertiser for 23 years.

His son, Devin LeMahieu, went on to serve in the Wisconsin Senate and is the current majority leader in the Senate.

== Early life and career ==
Daniel LeMahieu was born in Sheboygan, Wisconsin, and raised in the Sheboygan area; he graduated from Oostburg High School in 1964 and went on to attend University of Wisconsin–Sheboygan and University of Wisconsin–Milwaukee.

In the summer of 1969, he was drafted into the United States Army for a two year term. In the Army, LeMahieu served in Korea as a chaplain's assistant, and rose to the rank of Specialist E-5.

After his discharge from the Army, LeMahieu was employed in advertising with News Graphic until 1983, when he purchased ownership of the Lakeshore Weekly advertiser paper. Publishing the Lakeshore Weekly became his primary occupation for the remainder of his working career.

== Political career ==
LeMahieu was elected to the Sheboygan County board of supervisors in 1988, and served continuously until his election to the Assembly. In 2000 he was elected chairman of the county board.

LeMahieu served in the Wisconsin State Assembly from 2003 to 2015.

== Personal life and family ==
Daniel LeMahieu married Rosemary DeMaster in August 1967. They had three children together and were married for nearly 55 years before his death.

LeMahieu died at St. Vincent Hospital in Green Bay, Wisconsin, on February 18, 2022, at the age of 75. He was survived by his wife and all three children, along with eight grandchildren.

Wisconsin State Assembly
Preceded by Glenn Grothman	Member of the Wisconsin State Assembly from the 59th district January 6, 2003 – January 5, 2015	Succeeded by Jesse Kremer
