= 2020 Wisconsin State Assembly election =

- November 3, 2020

All 99 seats in the Wisconsin State Assembly 50 seats needed for a majority
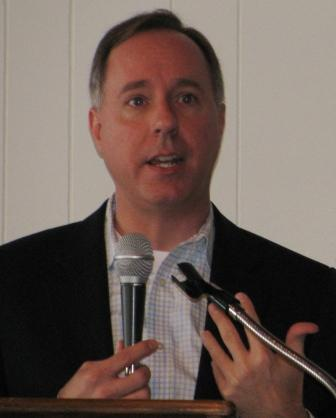

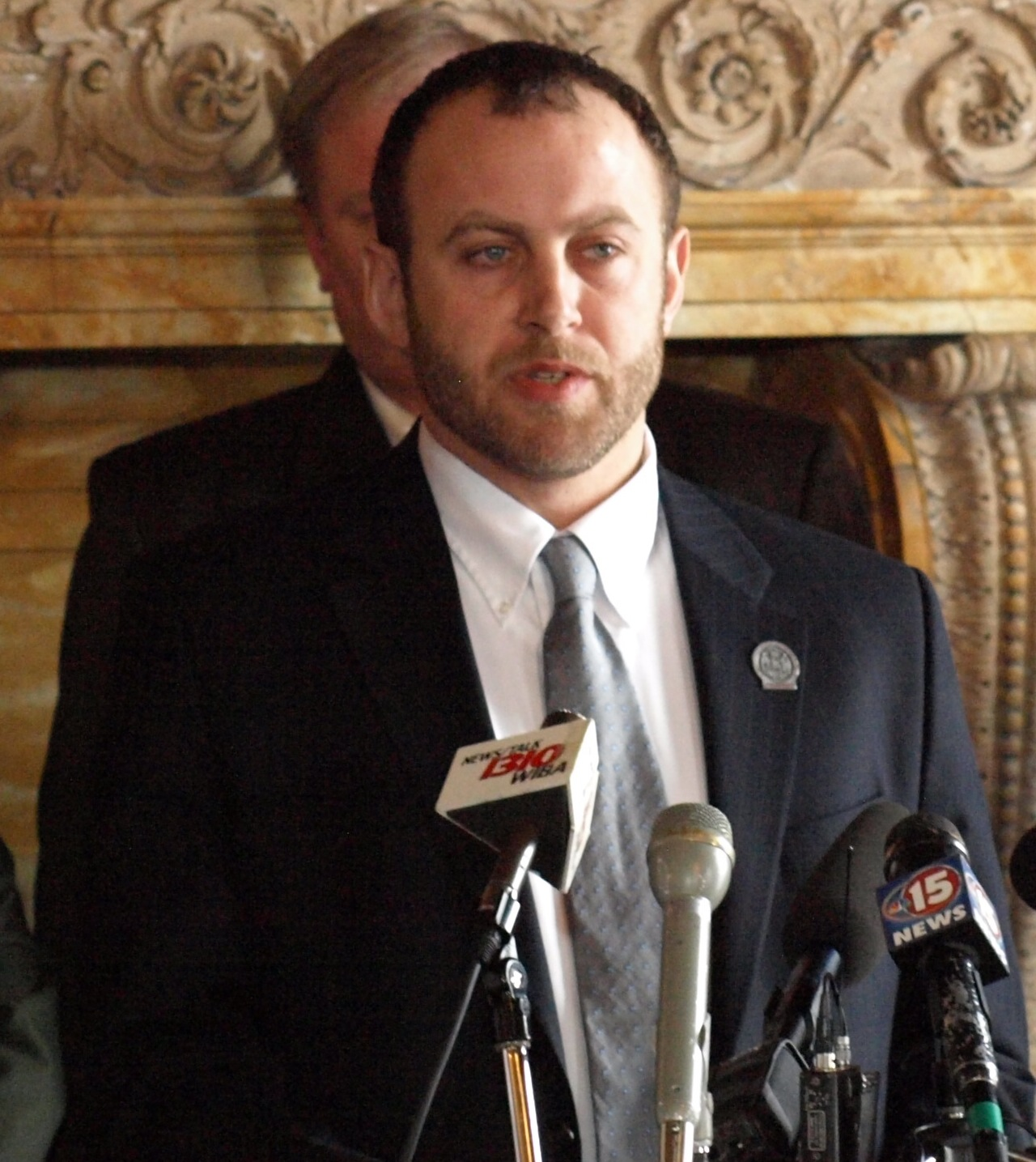
	Majority party	Minority party
Leader	Robin Vos	Gordon Hintz
Party	Republican	Democratic
Leader since	January 7, 2013	October 1, 2017
Leader's seat	63rd–Rochester	54th–Oshkosh
Last election	63 seats, 44.75%	36 seats, 52.99%
Seats won	61	38
Seat change	▼2	▲2
Popular vote	1,665,487	1,402,108
Percentage	53.80%	45.29%
Swing	▲9.1 pp	▼7.7 pp
- Republican hold Democratic gain Democratic hold 50–60% 60–70% 70–80% >90% 50–60% 60–70% 70–80% 80–90% >90%
Speaker before election
Robin Vos
Republican
Speaker-designate
Robin Vos
Republican

The Wisconsin State Assembly elections of 2020 were held on Tuesday, November 3, 2020. All 99 seats in the Wisconsin State Assembly were up for election. 13 incumbent Assembly members filed papers declaring that they would not run for re-election, including two who announced early vacancies. Right before this election, 63 Assembly seats were held by Republicans, 34 seats were held by Democrats, and two seats were vacant (both seats were vacated by Democrats).

== Predictions ==
Source	Ranking	As of
The Cook Political Report	Likely R	October 21, 2020

== Summary ==
Seats		Party (majority caucus shading)		Total
Seats		Democratic	Republican	Total
Last election (2018)		36	63	99
Total after last election (2018)		36	63	99
Total before this election		34	63	97
Up for election		36	63	99
of which:	Incumbent retiring	6	6	12
of which:	Vacated	2	-	2
of which:	Unopposed	6	12	18
This election		38	61	99
Change from last election		▲2	▼2	Steady
Total after this election		38	61	99
Change in total		▲2	▼2	Steady

=== Close races ===
Seats where the margin of victory was under 10%:

1. State Assembly district 73, 0.42%
2. State Assembly district 13, 1.46% (gain)
3. State Assembly district 74, 2.96%
4. State Assembly district 24, 2.96%
5. State Assembly district 23, 3.24% (gain)
6. State Assembly district 82, 3.74%
7. State Assembly district 51, 4.1%
8. State Assembly district 88, 4.68%
9. State Assembly district 4, 5.98%
10. State Assembly district 94, 7.27%
11. State Assembly district 54, 8.5%
12. State Assembly district 14, 8.04%
13. State Assembly district 21, 9.32%
14. State Assembly district 15, 9.6%
15. State Assembly district 45, 9.7%
16. State Assembly district 55, 9.78%

== Outgoing incumbents ==
=== Retiring ===
- Jason Fields (D–Milwaukee), representing district 11 since 2016, did not seek re-election.
- Debra Kolste (D–Janesville), representing district 44 since 2012, did not seek re-election.
- Bob Kulp (R–Stratford), representing district 69 since 2013, did not seek re-election.
- Romaine Quinn (R–Barron), representing district 75 since 2014, did not seek re-election.
- Mike Rohrkaste (R–Neenah), representing district 55 since 2014, did not seek re-election.

=== Seeking other office ===
- Melissa Agard (D–Madison), representing district 48 since 2012, ran for Wisconsin Senate in Wisconsin's 16th Senate district.
- Joan Ballweg (R–Markesan), representing district 41 since 2004, ran for Wisconsin Senate in Wisconsin's 14th Senate district.
- Mary Felzkowski (R–Irma), representing district 35 since 2016, ran for Wisconsin Senate in Wisconsin's 12th Senate district.
- Rob Stafsholt (R–New Richmond), representing district 29 since 2016, ran for Wisconsin Senate in Wisconsin's 10th Senate district.
- Amanda Stuck (D–Appleton), representing district 57 since 2014, ran for U.S. Representative in Wisconsin's 8th congressional district.
- JoCasta Zamarripa (D–Milwaukee), representing district 8 since 2010, ran for Milwaukee Common Council.

=== Lost renomination ===
- Staush Gruszynski (D–Green Bay), representing district 90 since 2018, lost renomination to Kristina Shelton (D–Green Bay) after sexually assaulting a legislative staffer.

=== Vacated ===
- David Crowley (D–Milwaukee)
- Chris Taylor (D–Madison

== Candidates ==
District	Incumbent				This race	
District	Member	Party	First elected	Status	Candidates	Results
1	Joel Kitchens	Republican	2014	Running	✓ Joel Kitchens (Republican) 61.84%; Kim Delorit Jensen (Democratic) 38.16%	Incumbent re-elected
2	Shae Sortwell	Republican	2018	Running	✓ Shae Sortwell (Republican) 63.17%; Mark Kiley (Democratic) 36.83%	Incumbent re-elected
3	Ron Tusler	Republican	2016	Running	✓ Ron Tusler (Republican) 59.18%; Emily Voight (Democratic) 40.82%	Incumbent re-elected
4	David Steffen	Republican	2014	Running	✓ David Steffen (Republican) 52.99%; Kathy Hinkfuss (Democratic) 47.01%	Incumbent re-elected
5	Jim Steineke	Republican	2010	Running	✓ Jim Steineke (Republican)	Incumbent re-elected
6	Gary Tauchen	Republican	2006	Running	✓ Gary Tauchen (Republican) 69.41%; Richard Sarnwick (Democratic) 30.59%	Incumbent re-elected
7	Daniel Riemer	Democratic	2012	Running	✓ Daniel Riemer (Democratic)	Incumbent re-elected
8	JoCasta Zamarripa	Democratic	2010	Not running	✓ Sylvia Ortiz-Velez (Democratic) 78.96%; Angel Sanchez (Republican) 21.04%	Incumbent retired New member elected Democratic hold
9	Marisabel Cabrera	Democratic	2018	Running	✓ Marisabel Cabrera (Democratic) 72.88%; Veronica Diaz (Republican) 27.12%	Incumbent re-elected
10	David Bowen	Democratic	2014	Running	✓ David Bowen (Democratic)	Incumbent re-elected
11	Jason Fields	Democratic	2016	Not running	✓ Dora Drake (Democratic) 84.75%; Orlando Owens (Republican) 15.25%	Incumbent retired New member elected Democratic hold
12	LaKeshia Myers	Democratic	2018	Running	✓ LaKeshia Myers (Democratic) 81.83%; Ozell Cox (Republican) 18.17%	Incumbent re-elected
13	Rob Hutton	Republican	2012	Running	✓ Sara Rodriguez (Democratic) 50.73%; Rob Hutton (Republican) 49.27%	Incumbent lost New member elected Democratic gain
14	Robyn Vining	Democratic	2018	Running	✓ Robyn Vining (Democratic) 54.02%; Bonnie Lee (Republican) 45.98%	Incumbent re-elected
15	Joe Sanfelippo	Republican	2012	Running	✓ Joe Sanfelippo (Republican) 54.8%; Jessica Katzenmeyer (Democratic) 45.2%	Incumbent re-elected
16	Kalan Haywood	Democratic	2018	Running	✓ Kalan Haywood (Democratic) 89.14%; Dennis Walton (Independent) 10.86%	Incumbent re-elected
17	David Crowley	Democratic	2017	Vacant	✓ Supreme Moore Omokunde (Democratic) 86.04%; Abie Eisenbach (Republican) 13.96%	Incumbent resigned after being elected Milwaukee County Executive; New member elected Democratic hold
18	Evan Goyke	Democratic	2012	Running	✓ Evan Goyke (Democratic)	Incumbent re-elected
19	Jonathan Brostoff	Democratic	2014	Running	✓ Jonathan Brostoff (Democratic) 78.52%; Helmut Fritz (Republican) 21.48%	Incumbent re-elected
20	Christine Sinicki	Democratic	1998	Running	✓ Christine Sinicki (Democratic)	Incumbent re-elected
21	Jessie Rodriguez	Republican	2013	Running	✓ Jessie Rodriguez (Republican) 54.66%; Erik Brooks (Democratic) 45.34%	Incumbent re-elected
22	Janel Brandtjen	Republican	2014	Running	✓ Janel Brandtjen (Republican)	Incumbent re-elected
23	Jim Ott	Republican	2007	Running	✓ Deb Andraca (Democratic) 51.62%; Jim Ott (Republican) 48.38%	Incumbent lost New member elected Democratic gain
24	Dan Knodl	Republican	2008	Running	✓ Dan Knodl (Republican) 51.48%; Emily Siegrist (Democratic) 48.52%	Incumbent re-elected
25	Paul Tittl	Republican	2012	Running	✓ Paul Tittl (Republican) 64.68%; Kerry Trask (Democratic) 35.32%	Incumbent re-elected
26	Terry Katsma	Republican	2014	Running	✓ Terry Katsma (Republican) 58.98%; Mary Donohue (Democratic) 41.02%	Incumbent re-elected
27	Tyler Vorpagel	Republican	2014	Running	✓ Tyler Vorpagel (Republican)	Incumbent re-elected
28	Gae Magnafici	Republican	2018	Running	✓ Gae Magnafici (Republican) 63.93%; Kim Butler (Democratic) 36.07%	Incumbent re-elected
29	Rob Stafsholt	Republican	2016	Not running	✓ Clint Moses (Republican) 60.25%; John Calabrese (Democratic) 39.75%	Incumbent retired to run for Wisconsin Senate; New member elected Republican hold
30	Shannon Zimmerman	Republican	2016	Running	✓ Shannon Zimmerman (Republican) 55.93%; Sarah Yacoub (Democratic) 44.07%	Incumbent re-elected
31	Amy Loudenbeck	Republican	2010	Running	✓ Amy Loudenbeck (Republican) 59.57%; Elizabeth Lochner-Abel (Democratic) 40.43%	Incumbent re-elected
32	Tyler August	Republican	2010	Running	✓ Tyler August (Republican) 61.81%; Katherine Gaulke (Democratic) 38.19%	Incumbent re-elected
33	Cody Horlacher	Republican	2014	Running	✓ Cody Horlacher (Republican) 61.91%; Mason Becker (Democratic) 38.09%	Incumbent re-elected
34	Rob Swearingen	Republican	2012	Running	✓ Rob Swearingen (Republican) 63.34%; Kirk Bangstad (Democratic) 36.66%	Incumbent re-elected
35	Mary Felzkowski	Republican	2012	Not running	✓ Calvin Callahan (Republican) 65.32%; Tyler Ruprecht (Democratic) 34.68%	Incumbent retired to run for Wisconsin Senate; New member elected Republican hold
36	Jeffrey Mursau	Republican	2004	Running	✓ Jeffrey Mursau (Republican)	Incumbent re-elected
37	John Jagler	Republican	2012	Running	✓ John Jagler (Republican) 56.1%; Abigail Lowery (Democratic) 40.89%; Stephen Ratzlaff (Independent) 3.01%	Incumbent re-elected
38	Barbara Dittrich	Republican	2018	Running	✓ Barbara Dittrich (Republican) 58.5%; Melissa Winker (Democratic) 41.5%	Incumbent re-elected
39	Mark Born	Republican	2012	Running	✓ Mark Born (Republican) 68.73%; Izzy Nevarez (Democratic) 31.27%	Incumbent re-elected
40	Kevin David Petersen	Republican	2006	Running	✓ Kevin David Petersen (Republican) 69.41%; Deb Silvers (Democratic) 30.59%	Incumbent re-elected
41	Joan Ballweg	Republican	2004	Not running	✓ Alex Dallman (Republican) 60.58%; Nate Zimdars (Democratic) 33.95%; Jean Bartz (Independent) 5.47%	Incumbent retired to run for Wisconsin Senate; New member elected Republican hold
42	Jon Plumer	Republican	2018 (special)	Running	✓ Jon Plumer (Republican) 59.19%; Melisa Arndt (Democratic) 40.81%	Incumbent re-elected
43	Don Vruwink	Democratic	2016	Running	✓ Don Vruwink (Democratic) 55.3%; Beth Drew (Republican) 44.7%	Incumbent re-elected
44	Debra Kolste	Democratic	2012	Not running	✓ Sue Conley (Democratic) 60.28%; DuWayne Severson (Republican) 39.72%	Incumbent retired New member elected Democratic hold
45	Mark Spreitzer	Democratic	2014	Running	✓ Mark Spreitzer (Democratic) 54.85%; Tawny Gustina (Republican) 45.15%	Incumbent re-elected
46	Gary Hebl	Democratic	2004	Running	✓ Gary Hebl (Democratic) 67.76%; Terry Lyon (Republican) 32.24%	Incumbent re-elected
47	Jimmy P. Anderson	Democratic	2016	Running	✓ Jimmy P. Anderson (Democratic) 74.97%; Phil Anderson (Republican) 25.03%	Incumbent re-elected
48	Melissa Agard	Democratic	2012	Not running	✓ Samba Baldeh (Democratic) 79.72%; Samuel Anderson (Republican) 20.28%	Incumbent retired to run for Wisconsin Senate; New member elected Democratic hold
49	Travis Tranel	Republican	2010	Running	✓ Travis Tranel (Republican) 59.43%; Shaun Murphy-Lopez (Democratic) 40.57%	Incumbent re-elected
50	Tony Kurtz	Republican	2018	Running	✓ Tony Kurtz (Republican) 63.31%; Mark Waldon (Democratic) 36.69%	Incumbent re-elected
51	Todd Novak	Republican	2014	Running	✓ Todd Novak (Republican) 52.05%; Kriss Marion (Democratic) 47.95%	Incumbent re-elected
52	Jeremy Thiesfeldt	Republican	2010	Running	✓ Jeremy Thiesfeldt (Republican) 61.98%; Julie Schroeder (Democratic) 38.02%	Incumbent re-elected
53	Michael Schraa	Republican	2012	Running	✓ Michael Schraa (Republican) 68.58%; Joseph Connelly (Independent) 31.42%	Incumbent re-elected
54	Gordon Hintz	Democratic	2006	Running	✓ Gordon Hintz (Democratic) 54.25%; Donny Herman (Republican) 45.75%	Incumbent re-elected
55	Mike Rohrkaste	Republican	2014	Not running	✓ Rachael Cabral-Guevara (Republican) 54.89%; Daniel Schierl (Democratic) 45.11%	Incumbent retired New member elected Republican hold
56	Dave Murphy	Republican	2012	Running	✓ Dave Murphy (Republican) 60.53%; Diana Lawrence (Democratic) 39.47%	Incumbent re-elected
57	Amanda Stuck	Democratic	2014	Not running	✓ Lee Snodgrass (Democratic) 56.54%; Eric Beach (Republican) 43.46%	Incumbent retired to run for U.S. Representative; New member elected Democratic hold
58	Rick Gundrum	Republican	2018 (special)	Running	✓ Rick Gundrum (Republican)	Incumbent re-elected
59	Timothy Ramthun	Republican	2018	Running	✓ Timothy Ramthun (Republican)	Incumbent re-elected
60	Robert Brooks	Republican	2011	Running	✓ Robert Brooks (Republican)	Incumbent re-elected
61	Samantha Kerkman	Republican	2000	Running	✓ Samantha Kerkman (Republican)	Incumbent re-elected
62	Robert Wittke	Republican	2018	Running	✓ Robert Wittke (Republican) 58.68%; August Schutz (Democratic) 41.32%	Incumbent re-elected
63	Robin Vos	Republican	2004	Running	✓ Robin Vos (Republican) 58.5%; Joel Jacobsen (Democratic) 41.5%	Incumbent re-elected
64	Tip McGuire	Democratic	2019	Running	✓ Tip McGuire (Democratic) 56.09%; Ed Hibsch (Republican) 43.91%	Incumbent re-elected
65	Tod Ohnstad	Democratic	2012	Running	✓ Tod Ohnstad (Democratic) 60.32%; Crystal Miller (Republican) 39.68%	Incumbent re-elected
66	Greta Neubauer	Democratic	2018 (special)	Running	✓ Greta Neubauer (Democratic) 70.31%; Will Leverson (Republican) 29.69%	Incumbent re-elected
67	Rob Summerfield	Republican	2016	Running	✓ Rob Summerfield (Republican) 63.97%; Chris Kapsner (Democratic) 36.03%	Incumbent re-elected
68	Jesse James	Republican	2018	Running	✓ Jesse James (Republican) 60.96%; Emily Berge (Democratic) 39.04%	Incumbent re-elected
69	Bob Kulp	Republican	2013 (special)	Not running	✓ Donna Rozar (Republican) 65.9%; Brian Giles (Democratic) 34.1%	Incumbent retired New member elected Republican hold
70	Nancy VanderMeer	Republican	2014	Running	✓ Nancy VanderMeer (Republican) 66.74%; John Baldus (Democratic) 33.26%	Incumbent re-elected
71	Katrina Shankland	Democratic	2012	Running	✓ Katrina Shankland (Democratic) 55.55%; Scott Soik (Republican) 44.45%	Incumbent re-elected
72	Scott Krug	Republican	2010	Running	✓ Scott Krug (Republican) 60.35%; Criste Greening (Democratic) 39.65%	Incumbent re-elected
73	Nick Milroy	Democratic	2008	Running	✓ Nick Milroy (Democratic) 50.21%; Keith Kern (Republican) 49.79%	Incumbent re-elected
74	Beth Meyers	Democratic	2014	Running	✓ Beth Meyers (Democratic) 51.48%; James Bolen (Republican) 48.52%	Incumbent re-elected
75	Romaine Quinn	Republican	2014	Not running	✓ David Armstrong (Republican) 62.35%; Ellenson John (Democratic) 37.65%	Incumbent retired New member elected Republican hold
76	Chris Taylor	Democratic	2011	Vacant	✓ Francesca Hong (Democratic) 88.02%; Patrick Hull (Republican) 11.77%	Incumbent resigned after being appointed to Dane County Circuit Court; New member elected Democratic hold
77	Shelia Stubbs	Democratic	2018	Running	✓ Shelia Stubbs (Democratic)	Incumbent re-elected
78	Lisa Subeck	Democratic	2014	Running	✓ Lisa Subeck (Democratic)	Incumbent re-elected
79	Dianne Hesselbein	Democratic	2012	Running	✓ Dianne Hesselbein (Democratic) 67.1%; Victoria Fueger (Republican) 32.8%	Incumbent re-elected
80	Sondy Pope-Roberts	Democratic	2002	Running	✓ Sondy Pope-Roberts (Democratic) 64.52%; Chase Binnie (Republican) 35.48%	Incumbent re-elected
81	Dave Considine	Democratic	2014	Running	✓ Dave Considine (Democratic) 56.92%; David Dahlke (Republican) 43.08%	Incumbent re-elected
82	Ken Skowronski	Republican	2013	Running	✓ Ken Skowronski (Republican) 50.27%; Jacob Malinowski (Democratic) 46.53%; Marc Ciske (Independent) 3.21%	Incumbent re-elected
83	Chuck Wichgers	Republican	2016	Running	✓ Chuck Wichgers (Republican) 69.7%; Alan DeYoung (Democratic) 30.3%	Incumbent re-elected
84	Mike Kuglitsch	Republican	2010	Running	✓ Mike Kuglitsch (Republican)	Incumbent re-elected
85	Patrick Snyder	Republican	2016	Running	✓ Patrick Snyder (Republican) 55.12%; Jeff Johnson (Democratic) 44.88%	Incumbent re-elected
86	John Spiros	Republican	2012	Running	✓ John Spiros (Republican)	Incumbent re-elected
87	James W. Edming	Republican	2014	Running	✓ James W. Edming (Republican) 70.85%; Richard Pulcher (Democratic) 29.15%	Incumbent re-elected
88	John Macco	Republican	2014	Running	✓ John Macco (Republican) 52.34%; Kristin Lyerly (Democratic) 47.66%	Incumbent re-elected
89	John Nygren	Republican	2006	Running	✓ John Nygren (Republican) 68.75%; Karl Jaeger (Democratic) 31.25%	Incumbent re-elected
90	Staush Gruszynski	Democratic	2018	Incumbent lost renomination	✓ Kristina Shelton (Democratic) 60.21%; Drew Kirsteatter (Republican) 39.79%	Incumbent lost renomination New member elected Democratic hold
91	Jodi Emerson	Democratic	2018	Running	✓ Jodi Emerson (Democratic) 61.93%; Charlie Walker (Republican) 38.07%	Incumbent re-elected
92	Treig Pronschinske	Republican	2016	Running	✓ Treig Pronschinske (Republican) 58.61%; Amanda WhiteEagle (Democratic) 41.39%	Incumbent re-elected
93	Warren Petryk	Republican	2010	Running	✓ Warren Petryk (Republican) 61.69%; Charlene Charlie Warner (Democratic) 38.31%	Incumbent re-elected
94	Steve Doyle	Democratic	2011 (special)	Running	✓ Steve Doyle (Democratic) 52.45%; Kevin Hoyer (Republican) 45.18%; Leroy Brown (Independent) 2.37%	Incumbent re-elected
95	Jill Billings	Democratic	2011 (special)	Running	✓ Jill Billings (Democratic) 65.71%; Jerome Gundersen (Republican) 34.29%	Incumbent re-elected
96	Loren Oldenburg	Republican	2018	Running	✓ Loren Oldenburg (Republican) 56.28%; Josefine Jaynes (Democratic) 43.72%	Incumbent re-elected
97	Scott Allen	Republican	2014	Running	✓ Scott Allen (Republican) 59.24%; Aaron Perry (Democratic) 40.76%	Incumbent re-elected
98	Adam Neylon	Republican	2013 (special)	Running	✓ Adam Neylon (Republican)	Incumbent re-elected
99	Cindi Duchow	Republican	2015 (special)	Running	✓ Cindi Duchow (Republican)	Incumbent re-elected

== See also ==
- 2020 Wisconsin State Senate election
- 2020 Wisconsin elections
