= Ann Roe =

21st century American politician

Member of the Wisconsin State Assembly from the 44th district
- Incumbent
- Assumed office January 6, 2025
- Preceded by: Sue Conley

Personal details
- Born: Ann C. Spellman; July 18, 1966 (age 60) Chicago, Illinois, U.S.
- Party: Democratic
- Spouse: Jonathan D. Roe
- Children: 2
- Education: Lawrence University (B.A.); Northeastern University (M.B.A.)
- Occupation: Small business owner
- Website: Campaign website

Ann Spellman Roe (née Spellman; born c.1966) is an American educator, small business owner, and Democratic politician from Janesville, Wisconsin. She is a member of the Wisconsin State Assembly, representing Wisconsin's 44th Assembly district since 2025. She previously ran for U.S. House of Representatives in 2022.

== Biography ==
Ann Roe was born Ann Spellman in Chicago, Illinois. She was raised and educated in the Chicago area, graduating from Evanston Township High School in 1984. She went on to attend Lawrence University in Appleton, Wisconsin, earning her bachelor's degree in English and classical languages in 1988. She worked for some time in Minnesota, before continuing her education at Northeastern University, where she obtained her M.B.A. in 1994.

After earning her M.B.A., she moved to Janesville, Wisconsin. Since moving to Janesville, Roe has worked at various times as a lecturer at the University of Wisconsin–Whitewater's College of Business and Economics, and worked as a planning consultant for the School District of Janesville.

Since 2009, Roe has been a small business owner, running Custom College Solutions LLC, which helps students from grades 8 and up navigate high school, college, apprenticeships, jobs, and graduate school. She also served on several area nonprofit boards, including the Janesville Woman's Club and Downtown Janesville Inc., and was president of the Beloit Janesville Symphony Orchestra

== Political career ==
Roe made her first bid for elected office in 2022, when she ran for U.S. House of Representatives. Roe challenged Republican incumbent Bryan Steil in Wisconsin's 1st congressional district. Wisconsin had just undergone redistricting following the 2020 United States census and the 1st congressional district shifted to a slightly more favorable configuration for Democrats. The district stretched from Roe's home in Janesville, in central Rock County, east to Walworth, Racine, and Kenosha Counties, then north into southern Milwaukee County; the 2022 redistricting added the Democratic-friendly cities of Beloit and Whitewater, and the battleground southern Milwaukee suburbs of South Milwaukee, Greenfield, and Cudahy, while removing areas of Waukesha County. With the new district configuration, Roe came closer than any Democrat since 1996, but still fell 26,785 votes short of Steil.

In early 2024, incumbent state representative Sue Conley announced that she would not run for re-election to the Wisconsin State Assembly. Within days, Roe announced her candidacy to succeed Conley in the 44th Assembly district, and in the same press release announced that she had secured Conley's endorsement for her campaign. Roe also rolled out endorsements from Conley's predecessor Debra Kolste and the area's former state senator Timothy Cullen. Despite the strong endorsements, Roe faced a Democratic primary contest against Cathy Myers, a member of the Janesville School Board and former candidate for Congress. Roe narrowly prevailed in the primary, receiving 54% of the vote, then defeated police officer Bruce Danielson in the general election.

== Personal life and family ==
Ann Spellman is one of five children born to Harry Thomas and Nancy Eddy Spellman of Evanston, Illinois.

Ann Spellman took the last name Roe when she married pediatrician Jonathan D. Roe, who she met in college. They reside in Janesville and have two adult children.

== Electoral history ==
=== U.S. House (2022) ===
| Year | Election | Date | Elected | | | | Defeated | | | | Total | Plurality |
|---|---|---|---|---|---|---|---|---|---|---|---|---|
| 2022 | General | Nov. 8 | Bryan Steil (inc) | Republican | 162,610 | 54.05% | Ann Roe | Dem. | 135,825 | 45.14% | 300,867 | 26,785 |
| 2022 | General | Nov. 8 | Bryan Steil (inc) | Republican | 162,610 | 54.05% | Charles E. Barman | Ind. | 2,247 | 0.75% | 300,867 | 26,785 |

=== Wisconsin Assembly (2024) ===
| Year | Election | Date | Elected | | | | Defeated | | | | Total | Plurality |
|---|---|---|---|---|---|---|---|---|---|---|---|---|
| 2024 | Primary | Aug. 13 | Ann Roe | Democratic | 3,771 | 54.30% | Cathy Myers | Dem. | 3,170 | 45.64% | 6,945 | 601 |
| 2024 | General | Nov. 5 | Ann Roe | Democratic | 17,335 | 56.39% | Bruce Danielson | Rep. | 13,371 | 43.49% | 30,743 | 3,964 |

Wisconsin State Assembly
| Preceded by Sue Conley | Member of the Wisconsin State Assembly from the 44th district January 6, 2025 – present | Incumbent |
