= John Dewey Academy of Learning =

Public charter school in Green Bay, Wisconsin

Location
- 701 Cherry Street; Green Bay, Wisconsin; United States; 44.5132°N 87.9896°W

Information
- Type: Charter
- Motto: Learning by Doing
- Established: 2010
- School district: Green Bay Area Public Schools
- Administrator: Jenny Wassenberg
- Faculty: 15.35
- Teaching staff: 4.82 (FTE)
- Grades: 6–12
- Enrollment: 74 (2018–19)
- Colour
- Mascot: Dragon
- Nickname: JDAL
- Website: jdal.gbaps.org

The John Dewey Academy of Learning (JDAL) is a charter school of the Green Bay Area Public School District serving Green Bay, Wisconsin and the surrounding areas. It was founded in 2010, it has operated in its current location since 2019. It is one of two charter schools in GBAPSD.

== Harvey Street School (2010–2019) ==
John Dewey was formed by a contract with the Green Bay Area Public School District in 2010, opening its doors in the former St. Peter and Paul School building, which now hosts St. Thomas More Catholic School. At the time of its conception, and for a short time later, it operated with a principal overseeing day-to-day operations, who was shared at the time with Beaumont Elementary School.

The building, which was leased from the Roman Catholic Diocese of Green Bay, was rudimentary, and lacked essential services including appropriate shop and project space, and adequate food production and serving capabilities. Originally operating in an open concept design, by 2013, high volume levels due to poor acoustic design, and increasing enrollment lead to layout changes that survive today, with sprawling communal workplaces replaced by delineated and separate advisories.

The school remained in the building until funds could be acquired by the 2017 referendum, which allocated $2,250,000 for the building, acquisition, or renovation of a new school space. This referendum also lead to the John Dewey Academy of Learning 2.0 project (referred to exclusively as JDAL 2.0).

== The JDAL 2.0 Project ==
Intended as a way to allow the students to have a hand in creating the school that would one day be; the staff of the school, as well as the administration of the district organized the JDAL 2.0 project. Multiple designs for renovation and new construction were proposed, with the architects incorporating design elements for each in the final project. Of the multitude of designs created for the school, three were presented to the contracted architectural firm. They were known as: The New Construction Design, The Remodel Design, and The East High School Design.

=== The New Construction Design ===
The New Construction design was the most popular with students at the time, as accessed by a school administered survey. As popular as the design was, there was concern that the 2.25 million referendum would be insufficient to support the cost of building and outfitting a new school.

=== The "Mystery Space" Remodel Design ===
The Remodel Design was the second most popular among students, although the district failed to ever reveal which space it was intended to fill. The uncertainty as to whether or not it would involve the school being inside another school lead to the plan being second to the new construction design.

=== The West High School Design ===
The West High School Design was by far the least popular among students, as it involved the loss of autonomy by integration into available space at nearby Green Bay West High School. Despite the student's opposition, this plan had wide district support because of the ease of retrofitting, and the fact that the district would not need to acquire or maintain further property. The district ultimately capitulated, and the school received its current location on Cherry Street.

== Cherry Street School (since 2019) ==
During the summer of 2019, the school moved from its former Harvey Street location to its Cherry Street location, remaining on the east side of the city.

The Cherry Street School was converted from an old office building and also temporarily houses the other charter school in Green Bay, the Northeast Wisconsin School of Innovation. The school currently operates on a five-year contractual term, the maximum allowed by Wisconsin state law. The next school year in which the contract will be again up for discussion is 2025–26.

== Leadership ==
Since shortly after in its conception, JDAL operates largely without a principal, relying mainly on its lead adviser (currently Jen Agamaite), who traditionally also serves as the Green Bay Area Public School's Coordinator of Charter Schools. The school's leadership is also shared with Governance Council which is made up of parents and community members, and has some disciplinary and executive authority.

== Education ==
=== Enrollment ===
JDAL is an application only school, accepting students 6th-12th grade, although in practice, senior students are rarely if ever accepted. Enrollment is strictly voluntary, and as with other public schools in the area, the school is tuition free.

=== Advisories ===
JDAL utilizes Project Based Learning, ALEKS (for mathematics), Achieve3000 (for Language Arts), and a series of seminars taught by community members, parents, students, and staff. JDAL differs in operation from what is commonly found in high schools within the United States, and instead employing a classroom approach similar to an elementary or primary school, in which students remain in a single room for the majority of the school day. As of October 2019, there are five of such classrooms, colloquially referred to as 'advisories'. Within each advisory, a staff member familiar with a subject, or a series of subjects is found. Students are assigned to the advisories with some degree of randomness and generally remain within the same advisory throughout their schooling.

=== Seminars ===
As a conjunctive to projects, students often sign up for Seminars, a limited-term engagement varying from a few weeks to an entire semester. These courses are taught by existing staff, students, parents, and community members, under the supervision of one or more advisers. Seminars were briefly removed but brought back for the 2018–2019 school year, and have continued since then. In the past, these seminars have included a wide spectrum of topics, including everything from Crime Scene Investigation to Rape Culture in America.

== Community Outreach ==
As a part of the curriculum of JDAL, students must attain a minimum of 150 service hours by graduation and has several service learning campaigns throughout the school year. These service projects have taken many forms through the years, with some; including the Garlic Mustard Pull held at the Bay Beach Wildlife Sanctuary, and the Pest to Pesto meal held at NEW Community Shealter after; having become yearly staples.

== Campus ==
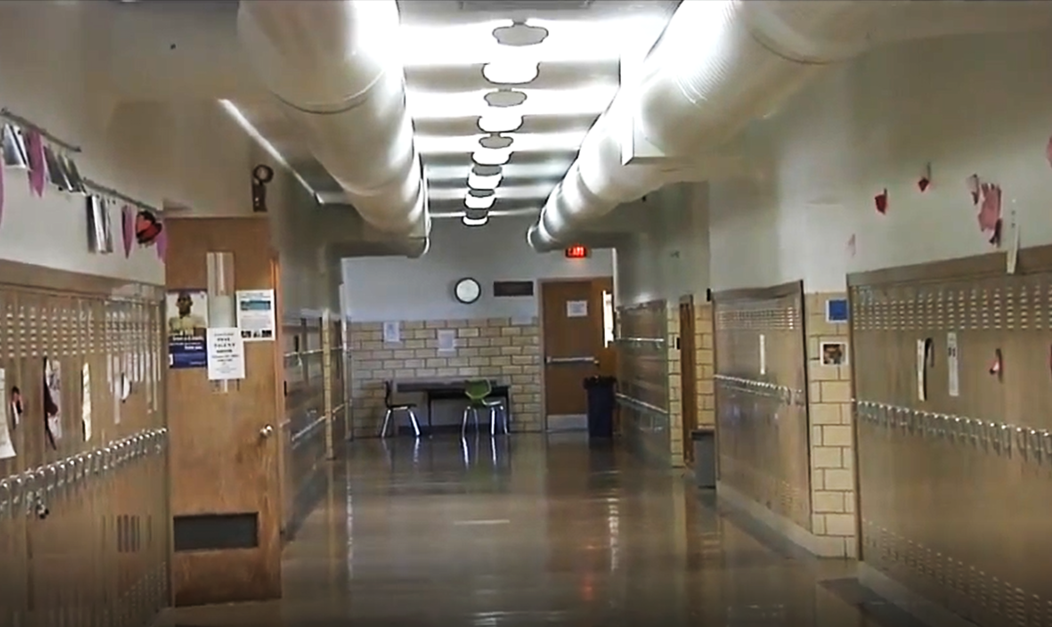
The main hallway of the Harvey Street School. While in this location, classrooms were to the left and right proceeding down the hallway, with the office being the first door on the right, and the special education classroom being the first door on the left.

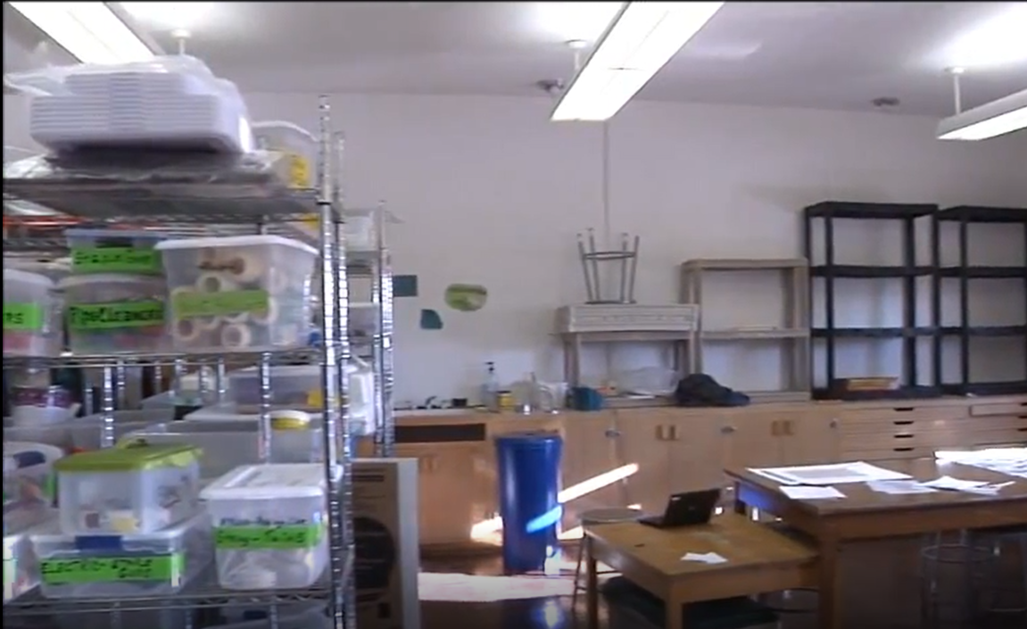
The project room of the Harvey Street School. Shown here is the storage area for general supplies on the left, a sink in the background, and drying/storage racks for painted and fragile works on the right.

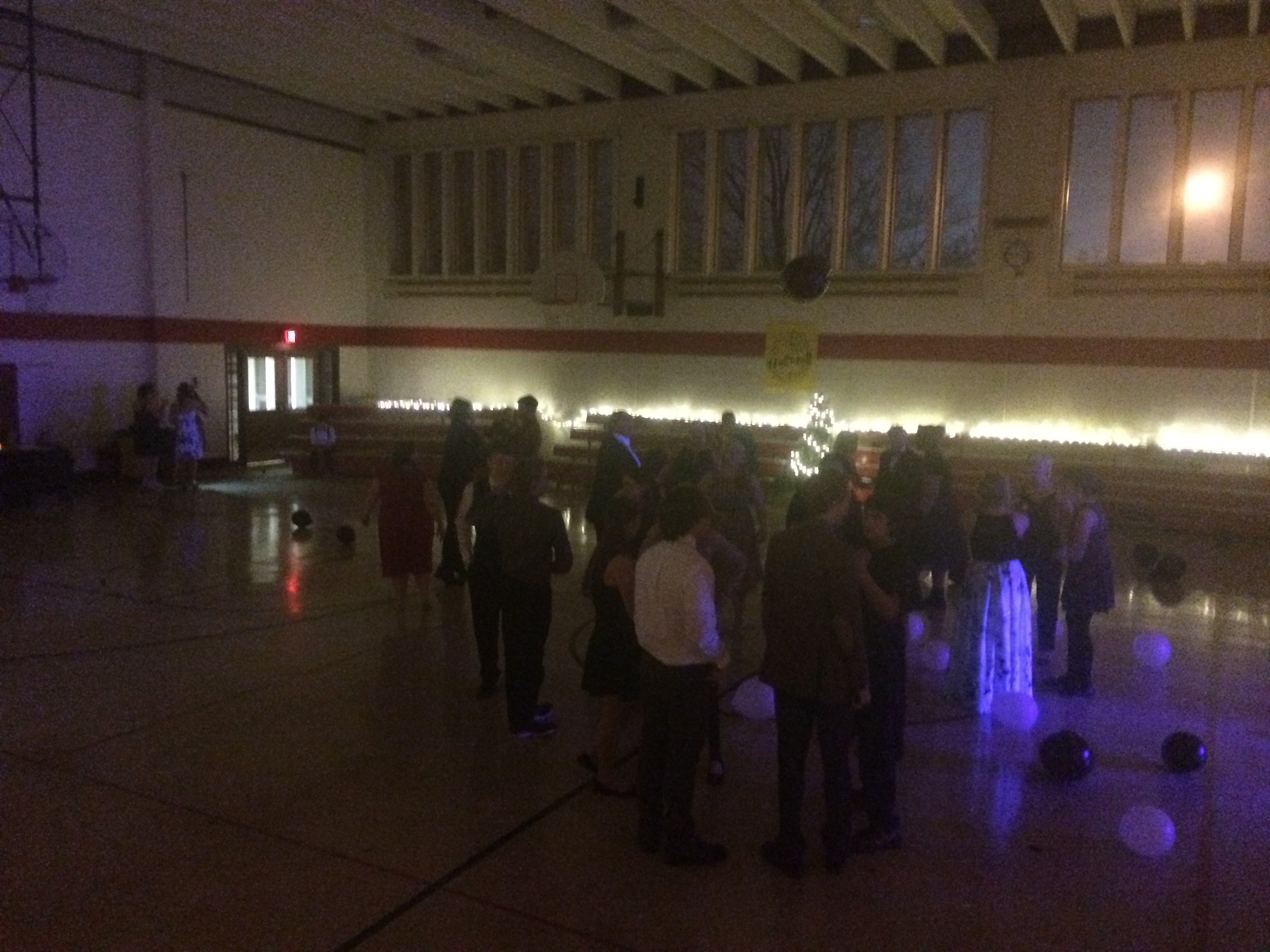
This photo is one of the only known representations of the dance itself and highlights the multiple issues the school faced at the Harvey Street Location, including limited space, inability to customize the space with school colors and branding, and a lackluster event space which was often commandeered by the diocese.
