= Kristina Sandherr =

American politician (born 1980)

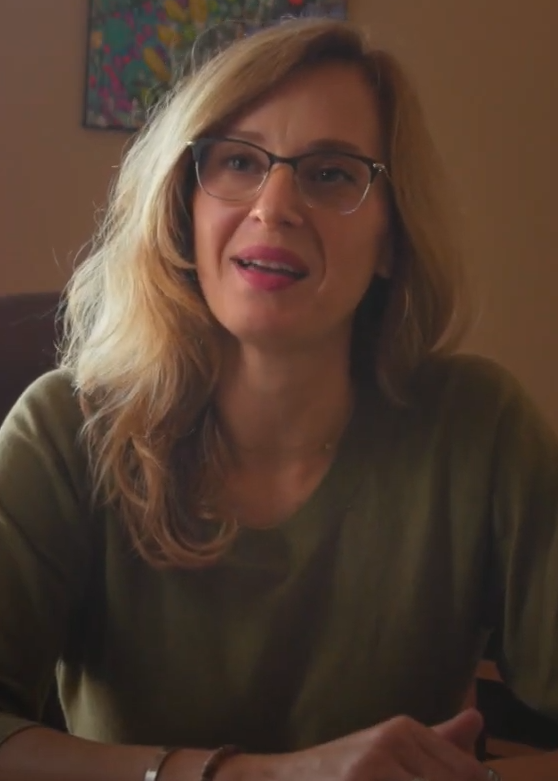
- Sandherr in 2022

Member of the Wisconsin State Assembly from the 90th district
- In office January 4, 2021 – January 6, 2025
- Preceded by: Staush Gruszynski
- Succeeded by: Amaad Rivera-Wagner

Member of the Green Bay Area School Board
- In office August 14, 2018 – January 4, 2021
- Preceded by: Christopher Wagner
- Succeeded by: Laura Laitinen-Warren

Personal details
- Born: Kristina Marie Sandherr; June 2, 1980 (age 46) Pittsburgh, Pennsylvania, U.S.
- Party: Democratic
- Spouse: Jon Shelton (m. 2006; div. 2023)
- Children: 2
- Education: Pennsylvania State University (BS); Marymount University (MS)
- Profession: educator, politician
- Website: Campaign website

Kristina Marie Sandherr (born June 2, 1980) is an American educator and Democratic politician from Green Bay, Wisconsin. She served two terms as a member of the Wisconsin State Assembly, representing Wisconsin's 90th Assembly district from 2021 to 2025. She also previously served on the Green Bay Area School Board.

During most of her political career, she was known by her married name, Kristina Shelton.

== Early life and career ==
Sandherr was born in Pittsburgh, Pennsylvania, on June 2, 1980. She attended Pennsylvania State University from 1998 until 2002, graduating with a B.S. in kinesiology, physical and health education. She later attended Marymount University from 2008 until 2010, earning a master's degree in science and health promotion management. She then taught in the Health and Physical Education department at Northern Virginia Community College from 2010 until 2013. Sandherr worked for Action for Healthy Kids from 2012 until 2019, when she became a program director at a Green Bay area YWCA.

== Political career ==
Sandherr's political career began as an appointee to the Green Bay Area Public School Board in 2018, chosen by the other members of the board from a list of applicants. She then won a three-year term in the 2019 spring election, and was serving as the board's vice president when she was elected to the state Assembly.

In December 2019, Green Bay's state representative, Staush Gruszynski, was the subject of sexual harassment accusations from an Assembly staffer. As a result, Gordon Hintz, Democratic leader in the Assembly, stripped Gruszynski of all committee assignments. Two months later, in February 2020, Sandherr announced she would launch a challenge against Gruszynski in the Democratic primary, with the hope of replacing him in the Wisconsin State Assembly. Sandherr defeated Gruszynski in the primary with nearly 80% of the vote, and went on to face Republican Drew Kirsteatter, a 21-year-old airline employee and college student, whom she defeated in the general election.

In February 2024, Sandherr announced she would not run for re-election that year and would retire from the Assembly to focus on her family and career.

Following her career in the Assembly, Sandherr became Executive Director of Wisconsin Progress, an organization focused on recruiting progressive candidates for public office.

== Personal life ==
Sandherr was married to Jon Shelton, a professor of history and Democracy & Justice Studies at the University of Wisconsin–Green Bay, until 2023. They have two children, Sara and Keith. Sandherr is a certified yoga instructor.

== Electoral history ==
=== Green Bay School Board (2019) ===
Green Bay Area School Board Election, 2019
Party	Candidate	Votes	%	±%
General Election, April 2, 2019 (choose three)
Nonpartisan	Eric Vanden Heuvel	13,756	25.16%	
Nonpartisan	Kristina Shelton (incumbent)	12,675	23.18%	
Nonpartisan	Brenda Warren (incumbent)	12,415	22.71%	
Nonpartisan	John Jahnke	9,950	18.20%	
Nonpartisan	Paul Boucher	5,877	10.75%	
Plurality		1,084	1.98%	
Total votes		54,676	100.0%	

=== Wisconsin Assembly (2020, 2022) ===
Year	Election	Date	Elected				Defeated				Total	Plurality
2020	Primary	Aug. 11	Kristina Shelton	Democratic	3,620	78.83%	Staush Gruszynski (inc)	Dem.	971	21.15%	4,592	2,649
2020	General	Nov. 3	Kristina Shelton	Democratic	12,756	60.14%	Drew Kirsteatter	Rep.	8,429	39.74%	21,210	4,327
2022	General	Nov. 8	Kristina Shelton (inc)	Democratic	9,885	59.10%	Micah Behnke	Rep.	6,818	40.77%	33,853	3,067

Wisconsin State Assembly
Preceded by Staush Gruszynski	Member of the Wisconsin State Assembly from the 90th district January 4, 2021 – January 6, 2025	Succeeded by Amaad Rivera-Wagner
