= Mary Lou E. Van Dreel =

American politician

Member of the Wisconsin State Assembly from the 90th district
- In office January 5, 1987 – January 4, 1993
- Preceded by: Sharon Metz
- Succeeded by: John Joseph Ryba

Personal details
- Born: Mary Lou E. Ambrosius; March 23, 1935 (age 91)
- Party: Democratic
- Spouse: Bernard Van Dreel
- Children: 3

Mary Lou E. Van Dreel (née Ambrosius; born March 23, 1935) was a member of the Wisconsin State Assembly. She graduated from Nicolet High School in De Pere, Wisconsin, as well as the University of Wisconsin–Stevens Point and the University of Wisconsin–Oshkosh. Van Dreel is married with three children.

== Career ==
Van Dreel was first elected to the Assembly in 1986. Additionally, she was a member of the Ashwaubenon Village Board from 1977 to 1987. She is a Democrat.

Wisconsin State Assembly
Preceded by Sharon Metz	Member of the Wisconsin State Assembly from the 90th district January 5, 1987 – January 4, 1993	Succeeded by John Joseph Ryba
