= Joe Knilans =

American politician (born 1964)

Member of the Wisconsin State Assembly from the 44th district
- In office January 3, 2011 – January 7, 2013
- Preceded by: Michael J. Sheridan
- Succeeded by: Debra Kolste

Personal details
- Born: March 20, 1964 (age 62) Janesville, Wisconsin
- Party: Republican
- Education: UW-Whitewater
- Profession: Politician

Joseph J. "Joe" Knilans (born March 20, 1964) is an American government administrator and former politician. A Republican, he most recently served as an appointee of U.S. President Donald Trump at the Small Business Administration. He previously served one term in the Wisconsin State Assembly and worked as an appointee of Governor Scott Walker at the Office of Business Development in the Wisconsin Department of Administration.

== Biography ==
Born in Janesville, Wisconsin, he graduated from the University of Wisconsin–Whitewater. He was elected to the Wisconsin State Assembly in 2010. In November 2012, the Democratic candidate Debra Kolste defeated Knilans.
