= Sue Conley (politician) =

21st century American politician, member-elect, Wisconsin State Assembly

Member of the Wisconsin State Assembly from the 44th district
- In office January 4, 2021 – January 6, 2025
- Preceded by: Debra Kolste
- Succeeded by: Ann Roe

President of the City Council of Janesville, Wisconsin
- In office April 21, 2020 – April 2021
- Preceded by: Douglas Marklein
- Succeeded by: Dave Marshick

Member of the City Council of Janesville, Wisconsin
- In office April 2017 – April 2021

Personal details
- Born: Sue Sharon Seibert; February 19, 1960 (age 66) Galesburg, Illinois, U.S.
- Party: Democratic
- Spouse: Jim Conley (m. 1987)
- Children: 3
- Profession: politician
- Website: Campaign website

Sue Sharon Conley (née Seibert; born February 19, 1960) is an American nonprofit administrator and Democratic politician from Janesville, Wisconsin. She served two terms as a member of the Wisconsin State Assembly, representing Wisconsin's 44th Assembly district from 2021 to 2025. She also previously served as president of the city council of Janesville.

== Early life and career ==
Sue Conley was born Sue Seibert in Galesburg, Illinois, in February 1960. As a child, she moved with her parents to Janesville, Wisconsin, in 1971, where she was raised and educated. She graduated from Janesville's Joseph A. Craig High School and went on to attend the University of Wisconsin–Whitewater and Blackhawk Technical College.

Conley became involved in nonprofit management in the Janesville community and was executive director of the Rock County YWCA, and later, from 2002 through 2014, with the Community Foundation of Southern Wisconsin. She retired in 2014, but continued to volunteer and offer her advice within the community, and served as interim executive director for several organizations over the next six years, including HealthNet of Rock County, KANDU Industries, and the UW–Rock County Foundation.

== Political career ==
Conley was elected to the Janesville city council in April 2017, and was reelected in 2019. At the start of the 2020–2021 session, Conley was elected President of the City Council.

In February 2020, Janesville's state representative, Debra Kolste, announced she would not seek a fifth term in the Wisconsin State Assembly in the 2020 election. Conley and Kolste were friends, and Conley had already been contemplating a run for higher office. With Kolste's endorsement, Conley entered the 2020 campaign. Conley was able to avoid a primary contest and secured the Democratic nomination unopposed. In the general election, she faced Republican former city councilmember DuWayne Severson; Libertarian hopeful Reese Wood had intended to run, but failed to secure enough valid signatures to appear on the ballot. During the campaign, Conley emphasized the need for redistricting reform, endorsing the so-called Iowa model of redistricting, utilizing a nonpartisan commission. In the general election, Conley defeated Severson with 60% of the vote.

== Personal life ==
Sue Conley is the eldest of seven children born to Bernard and Sheila (née Berry) Seibert. The Seiberts were Catholic.

Sue Seibert took the last name Conley when she married Jim Conley in 1987. They reside in Janesville and have three adult children.

== Electoral history ==
=== Janesville City Council (2017, 2019) ===
Janesville City Council Election, 2017
Party	Candidate	Votes	%	±%
General Election, April 4, 2017 (choose four)
Nonpartisan	Sue Conley	3,954	16.65%	
Nonpartisan	Douglas Marklein (incumbent)	3,502	14.74%	
Nonpartisan	Jim Farrell	3,201	13.48%	
Nonpartisan	Tom Wolfe	3,033	12.77%	
Nonpartisan	Kay Deupree (incumbent)	2,613	11.00%	
Nonpartisan	Jim Dennis	2,430	10.23%	
Nonpartisan	Steve Knox	2,332	9.82%	
Nonpartisan	Jeff Navarro	1,708	7.19%	
Nonpartisan	Spencer Zimmerman	721	3.04%	
	Scattering	259	1.09%	
Total votes		23,753	100.0%	

Janesville City Council Election, 2019
Party	Candidate	Votes	%	±%
General Election, April 2, 2019 (choose four)
Nonpartisan	Sue Conley (incumbent)	6,598	22.50%	+5.86%
Nonpartisan	Tom Wolfe (incumbent)	6,247	21.31%	+8.54%
Nonpartisan	Douglas Marklein (incumbent)	6,187	21.10%	+6.36%
Nonpartisan	Jim Farrell (incumbent)	5,720	19.51%	+6.03%
Nonpartisan	Jan Chesmore	4,384	14.95%	
	Scattering	185	0.63%	
Total votes		29,321	100.0%	

=== Wisconsin Assembly (2020) ===
Wisconsin Assembly, 44th District Election, 2020
Party	Candidate	Votes	%	±%
General Election, November 3, 2020
Democratic	Sue Conley	17,205	60.11%	−37.36%
Republican	DuWayne Severson	11,335	39.60%	
Independent	Reese Wood (write-in)	13	0.05%	
	Scattering	68	0.24%	
Plurality		5,870	20.51%	-74.43%
Total votes		28,621	100.0%	+54.94%
Democratic hold				

Wisconsin State Assembly
Preceded by Debra Kolste	Member of the Wisconsin State Assembly from the 44th district January 4, 2021 – January 6, 2025	Succeeded by Ann Roe
Political offices
Preceded by Douglas Marklein	President of the City Council of Janesville, Wisconsin; April 21, 2020 – April 2021	Succeeded by Dave Marshick
