= TAGOS Leadership Academy =

Coordinates: 42.701506°N 89.03071°W

Location
- 1350 N. Parker Drive; Janesville, Wisconsin 53545; United States

Information
- Type: Project-Based Charter School
- Motto: Purpose - Worthwhile Work - Making A Difference
- Established: 2007
- Oversight: Janesville School District
- Principal: Al Lindau
- Faculty: 9
- Grades: 7-12
- Enrollment: 80
- Colors: Grey & Purple
- Mascot: Tigers
- Newspaper: TAGOS Times
- Yearbook: The Tiger
- Website: http://tagosleadershipacademy.org

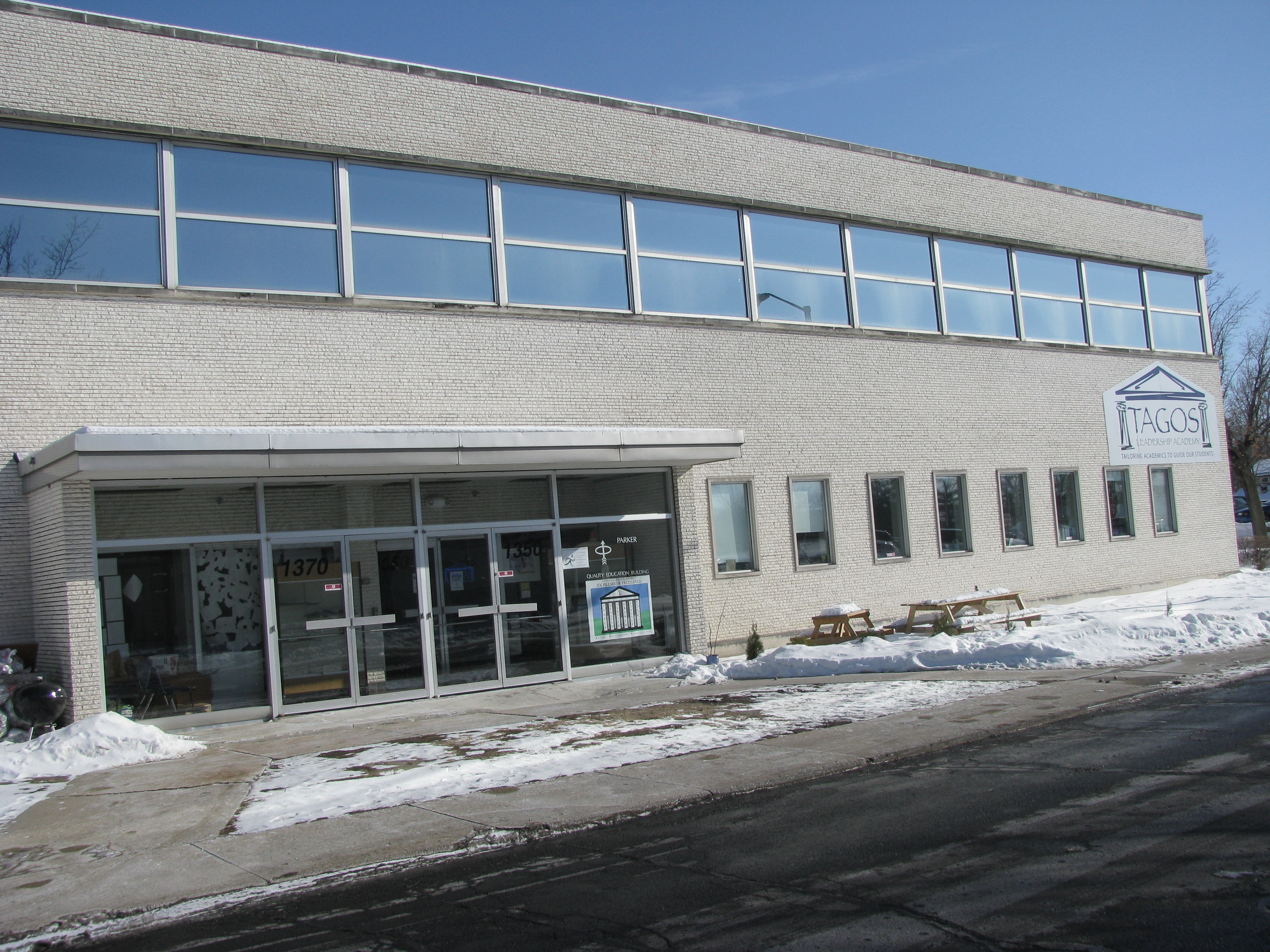
Image of the Main entrance of TAGOS

TAGOS Leadership Academy is a project-based charter school in the city of Janesville, Wisconsin. The school, affiliated with the School District of Janesville, is housed in the former Parker Pen Company facility, now known as the Arrow Park Complex. Al Lindau, the dean of students, TAGOS Leadership Academy was founded in 2007 by Al Lindau; he served as the dean of students at that time. The current dean of students is Nic Manogue.

The school name, TAGOS, is Greek for "leadership". The name is also an acronym for Tailoring Academics To Guide Our Students.

== History ==
The idea for TAGOS began in 2007 with a planning committee made up of community members that included teachers, local business owners, government officials, and local parents.

Receiving initial funding from the state of Wisconsin in the form of a planning grant, committee members visited model project-based schools across the United States, including schools in San Diego, Appleton, Wisconsin, Santa Fe, New Mexico and Henderson, Minnesota. The principles and practices demonstrated to work in the schools visited were then applied and adapted to TAGOS Leadership Academy.

TAGOS opened its doors to 36 students at the beginning of the 2007–2008 school year. At the time, construction at the building at Arrow Park was underway, so a rental building on S. Main Street in Janesville was used. On December 23, 2007, when construction was completed, TAGOS began its occupancy at Arrow Park.

== School grounds and facility ==
The TAGOS main school building is housed in a former Parker Pen Company warehouse in the Arrow Park Complex. The building is owned by real estate development company Hendricks Development Group of Beloit, Wisconsin who helped the Janesville School District locate the site and renovated it.

The building has been renovated twice since re-opening in 2007 and is now 8,000 sq ft (740 m^{2}). It contains a video and audio recording studio, a commercial kitchen and cafeteria, an art and pottery studio, and a library. The school relies heavily on technology. There is a computer for every student and instructor, two smart boards with projectors and a Macintosh computer.

== Curriculum ==
The curriculum at TAGOS Leadership Academy meets state academic standards. It primarily consists of student-driven project-based learning. Its seminars cover topics ranging from banking to personal health. Additional classes or seminars are also available. All school work is kept on a digital database called Project Foundry, a learning relationship management software where all the students' work is logged and progress can be reviewed.

Additional services include, but are not limited to:

- Virtual Academy
- Independent math or math recovery (Depending on need)
- Teen Leadership
- K9 Konnectz
- Internships
- Service learning
- Individual or family counseling

== Awards and recognition ==
TAGOS has been recognized by EdVisions as a lab school for the organization, a national project-based school cooperative. On July 25, 2008, staff at TAGOS were presented with an EdVisions plaque. In 2011, the school received a "School of Recognition" award from the Wisconsin Department of Public Instruction for achievement among students in poverty.
