= Amaad Rivera-Wagner =

21st century American politician

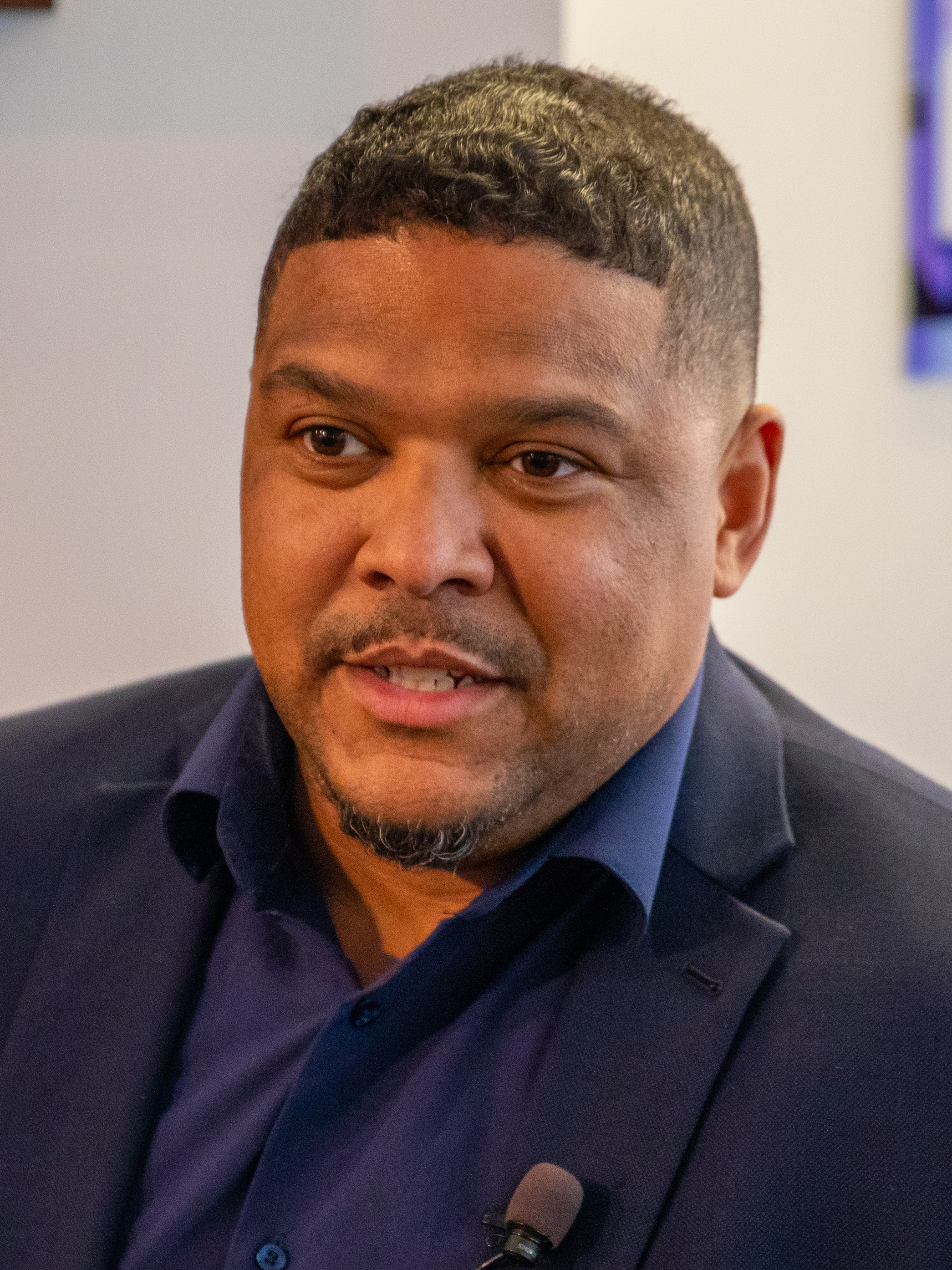
- Rivera-Wagner at University of Chicago in 2026

Member of the Wisconsin State Assembly from the 90th district
- Incumbent
- Assumed office January 6, 2025
- Preceded by: Kristina Sandherr

Personal details
- Born: Amaad Isiah Rivera; December 1981 (age 44) Springfield, Massachusetts
- Party: Democratic
- Spouse: William Wagner
- Website: Campaign website

Amaad Rivera-Wagner (born December 1981) is an American community organizer and Democratic politician from Green Bay, Wisconsin. He is a member of the Wisconsin State Assembly, representing Wisconsin's 90th Assembly district since 2025. He has served as chief of staff to Green Bay mayor Eric Genrich since 2021, and managed Genrich's 2023 re-election campaign. Earlier in his career, he was the first openly gay member of the City Council of Springfield, Massachusetts, served as a policy advisor to United States senator Ed Markey (D–MA), and ran for Massachusetts Senate.

After the 2020 United States presidential election, Rivera-Wagner was a target of Republican attacks and conspiracy theories due to his logistical role supporting the central count of Green Bay's absentee ballots in that election.

== Early life and education ==
Amaad Rivera-Wagner was born Amaad Rivera in Springfield, Massachusetts. He was raised and educated in Springfield and Chicopee, Massachusetts, graduating from the Springfield High School of Science and Technology in 2000. He was active community and social issues from an early age; in middle school he contributed several articles to a youth-focused section of the local newspaper, The Republican. His articles dealt with issues such as drug abuse, the O. J. Simpson murder trial, racism and prejudice, and underage drinking.

After high school, Rivera worked with the Holyoke Youth Commission, then enrolled in AmeriCorps.

== Political career ==
=== Massachusetts ===
==== Springfield City Council ====
Rivera made his first run for public office in 2009, when he ran for a seat on the City Council of Springfield, Massachusetts. Rivera topped the field in the nonpartisan primary, but lost the general election to public school teacher Keith W. Wright. A year after the election, however, Wright resigned his seat due to family issues. By law, the position was then offered to the 2nd-place finisher in the last election—Rivera. Rivera immediately indicated that he would accept the job, but before he could take office, questions were raised about his residency and eligibility. Another member of the City Council questioned whether Rivera, then a graduate student, was still residing in the district; his succession also raised questions about whether the law was intended to apply to offices like the one Rivera sought—where the general election featured only two candidates. With the support of the city elections secretary and city attorney, however, Rivera was able to take office on schedule at the start of the next term in January 2011. Rivera also ran afoul of campaign finance rules during his year on the City Council, having not filed a campaign finance report since before the 2009 election. He ultimately filed his late reports and paid a $100 fine.

His term on the City Council was set to expire just a year after his inauguration; rather than running for re-election in his district in 2011, he sought to move into an at-large seat, where he only had to finish within the top five vote-getters in a city-wide election. Rivera ultimately finished seventh and left office at the end of the year. Though his service was brief, Rivera was the first openly gay member of the Springfield City Council.

After leaving the City Council, Rivera was hired as a state policy advisor to U.S. Senator Ed Markey (D–MA).

==== Massachusetts State Senate Bid ====
In 2018, Rivera made another bid for elected office, launching a primary challenge against incumbent Democratic state senator James T. Welch. Rivera ran as a progressive challenger to the eight-year incumbent, Welch. Rivera had become active in the March for Our Lives movement after the shooting at Marjory Stoneman Douglas High School, and received the endorsement of the Springfield chapter of the organization in his primary bid. He was also endorsed by former Massachusetts Democratic Party chair John E. Walsh. After a fierce primary, Welch prevailed, taking 58% of the vote.

=== Wisconsin ===
Shortly after his run for state Senate, Rivera moved to Green Bay, Wisconsin, where he worked for the progressive nonprofit Opportunity Wisconsin. Following the murder of George Floyd, Rivera-Wagner became a leader of the protests in Green Bay and was ultimately hired by Green Bay mayor Eric Genrich as a community liaison for his office. Also that year, Rivera-Wagner was elected as a delegate to the 2020 Democratic National Convention, though that convention's in-person events were canceled due to the COVID-19 pandemic.

As a city employee, Rivera-Wagner was assigned to provide logistical support for the massive central count of Green Bay's absentee ballots for the 2020 United States presidential election. Because of the ongoing COVID-19 pandemic, the election had much higher than normal vote-by-mail utilization. After Joe Biden won the election, the defeated outgoing president, Donald Trump, sought to blame fraud involving absentee ballots for his loss. Although Rivera-Wagner's role in the central count was just logistical issues such as organizing parking passes and media access, he became a focus of attention from Republican allies of Donald Trump.

In 2021, Rivera-Wagner was promoted to Genrich's chief of staff, a position he'd hold for the next three years. As chief of staff, he handled oversight of some of the city's distribution of federal funds from the American Rescue Plan Act of 2021. He also managed the city funds for a major real estate redevelopment project on Green Bay's east side, on 25 acres of land donated by JBS Foods International. In 2022 and 2023, Rivera-Wagner also served as campaign manager for Genrich's successful 2023 re-election. He also serves co-chair of the Diversity and Inclusion Task Force for the Greater Green Bay Chamber of Commerce.

In early 2024, Green Bay's state representative Kristina Shelton announced she would not run for re-election. Around the same time, the Wisconsin Legislature adopted a new redistricting plan after the Wisconsin Supreme Court struck down the decade-old Republican gerrymander. Rivera-Wagner opted to enter the race for Wisconsin State Assembly in the redrawn 90th Assembly district. The 90th district formerly comprised most of central Green Bay, but after the redistricting, shifted to comprise more of Green Bay's east side. Rivera-Wagner secured the endorsement of Mayor Genrich and the outgoing state representative, Shelton, before announcing his campaign, and was then the only Democrat to run in the district. In the general election he faced Republican Jessica Henderson, a political newcomer. The general election was competitive, Rivera-Wagner prevailed by 1,224 votes. He took office in January 2025.

==== State Legislation ====
In the 2024-26 legislative session, Rivera-Wagner authored and passed the Workforce Home Loan Program along with the DACA professional licensing law. The Workforce Home Loan Program seeks to close the gap on housing by providing 0% financing. The DACA Professional Licensing bill allowed for individuals enrolled in the federal DACA program to obtain professional licenses in Wisconsin.

== Personal life and family ==
Amaad Rivera-Wagner was one of three children raised by his single mother, Kim Rivera, who was a teenager when he was born. After Rivera served on the Springfield City council, Kim Rivera sought election to the Council in 2015, but lost the election.

Amaad Rivera took the additional last name Wagner when he married William Wagner. They reside in Green Bay's Astor Park neighborhood with their two dogs, Appa and Lambeau.

== Electoral history ==
=== Massachusetts Senate (2018) ===
Year	Election	Date	Elected				Defeated				Total	Plurality
2018	Primary	Sep. 4	James T. Welch (inc)	Democratic	5,909	58.25%	Amaad Rivera-Wagner	Dem.	4,198	41.38%	10,145	1,711

=== Wisconsin Assembly (2024) ===
Year	Election	Date	Elected				Defeated				Total	Plurality
2024	General	Nov. 5	Amaad Rivera-Wagner	Democratic	12,446	52.53%	Jessica Henderson	Rep.	11,222	47.36%	23,693	1,224

Wisconsin State Assembly
Preceded by Kristina Shelton	Member of the Wisconsin State Assembly from the 90th district January 6, 2025 – present	Incumbent
