= Staush Gruszynski =

21st century American politician

Member of the Wisconsin State Assembly from the 90th district
- In office January 7, 2019 – December 28, 2020
- Preceded by: Eric Genrich
- Succeeded by: Kristina Shelton

Member of the Board of Supervisors of Brown County, Wisconsin, from the 5th district
- In office April 2014 – April 2020
- Preceded by: Brad Hopp
- Succeeded by: Emily Jacobson

Personal details
- Born: February 13, 1985 (age 41) Marinette, Wisconsin, U.S.
- Party: Democratic
- Spouse: Colleen E. Adams
- Children: 1
- Relatives: Stan Gruszynski (uncle)
- Education: University of Wisconsin–Oshkosh (B.S.)

Staush Gruszynski (born February 13, 1985) is an American nonprofit executive and former Democratic politician from Green Bay, Wisconsin. He served one term in the Wisconsin State Assembly, representing Wisconsin's 90th Assembly district during the 2019–2020 term. He also served six years on the board of supervisors of Brown County, Wisconsin, from 2014 to 2020.

His uncle, Stan Gruszynski, also served in the Wisconsin State Assembly in the 1980s and 1990s.

== Early life ==
Staush Gruszynski was born in Marinette, Wisconsin, in February 1985. He was raised and educated there, graduating from Marinette High School in 2003. During his early childhood, his uncle, Stan Gruszynski, was a member of the Wisconsin State Assembly, representing the Plover area. Gruszynski volunteered on his uncle's campaigns, and later said that it sparked his interest in politics. After high school, he attended the University of Wisconsin–Oshkosh, and earned his bachelor's degree in political science and public administration in 2008.

After college, Gruszynski settled in Green Bay, Wisconsin. He was employed by the Wisconsin League of Conservation Voters, eventually becoming political director of the organization. He was also active in other conservation efforts and was president of Green Bay's chapter of conservation group Trout Unlimited.

== Political career ==
Gruszynski won his first public office in 2014, when he was elected without opposition to the board of supervisors of Brown County, Wisconsin. He served six years on the board.

In 2017, Green Bay's state representative Eric Genrich was elected mayor of Green Bay, and announced he would not run for re-election to the Assembly. Gruszynski entered the race to succeed him, and faced no opposition in the primary or general election. He was sworn in as representative of the 90th Assembly district in January 2019.

In December 2019, the Wisconsin Legislative Human Resources Office substantiated a complaint that Gruszynski sexually harassed a legislative staffer at a bar. Democratic party leaders called on Gruszynski to resign, stripped him of his committee assignments, and prohibited him from caucusing with Democrats. Gruszynksi acknowledged that, on the night of the incident, he "was black out drunk [and] made inappropriate comments" but also "apologized [to the staffer] and was remorseful."

Gruszynski attempted to run for re-election in 2020, but was defeated in a primary challenge by Green Bay Area Public School District board member Kristina Shelton.

== Personal life ==
Staush Gruszynski married Colleen Adams; they have one child.

Wisconsin State Assembly
Preceded by Eric Genrich	Member of the Wisconsin State Assembly from the 90th district January 7, 2019 – December 28, 2020	Succeeded by Kristina Shelton
