= Wisconsin's 90th Assembly district =

State Legislative District for Green Bay, Wisconsin

Wisconsin's 90th State Assembly district
- 2024 map defined in 2023 Wisc. Act 94; 2022 map defined in Johnson v. Wisconsin Elections Commission; 2011 map was defined in 2011 Wisc. Act 43
Assemblymember
| Amaad Rivera-Wagner; D–Green Bay |
since January 6, 2025 (1 years)
- Demographics: 66.63% White; 6.06% Black; 19.29% Hispanic; 4.34% Asian; 4.56% Native American; 0.17% Hawaiian/Pacific Islander
- Population (2020) • Voting age: 59,551; 44,866
- Website: Official website
- Notes: Green Bay, Wisconsin

The 90th Assembly district of Wisconsin is one of 99 districts in the Wisconsin State Assembly. Located in northeastern Wisconsin, the district comprises the east side of the city of Green Bay, Wisconsin, in central Brown County. The district includes historic landmarks such as the Brown County Courthouse, Saint Francis Xavier Cathedral, the site of Fort Howard, the and the University of Wisconsin–Green Bay campus. It also contains the Bay Beach Wildlife Sanctuary. The district is represented by Democrat Amaad Rivera-Wagner, since January 2025.

The 90th Assembly district is located within Wisconsin's 30th Senate district, along with the 88th and 89th Assembly districts.

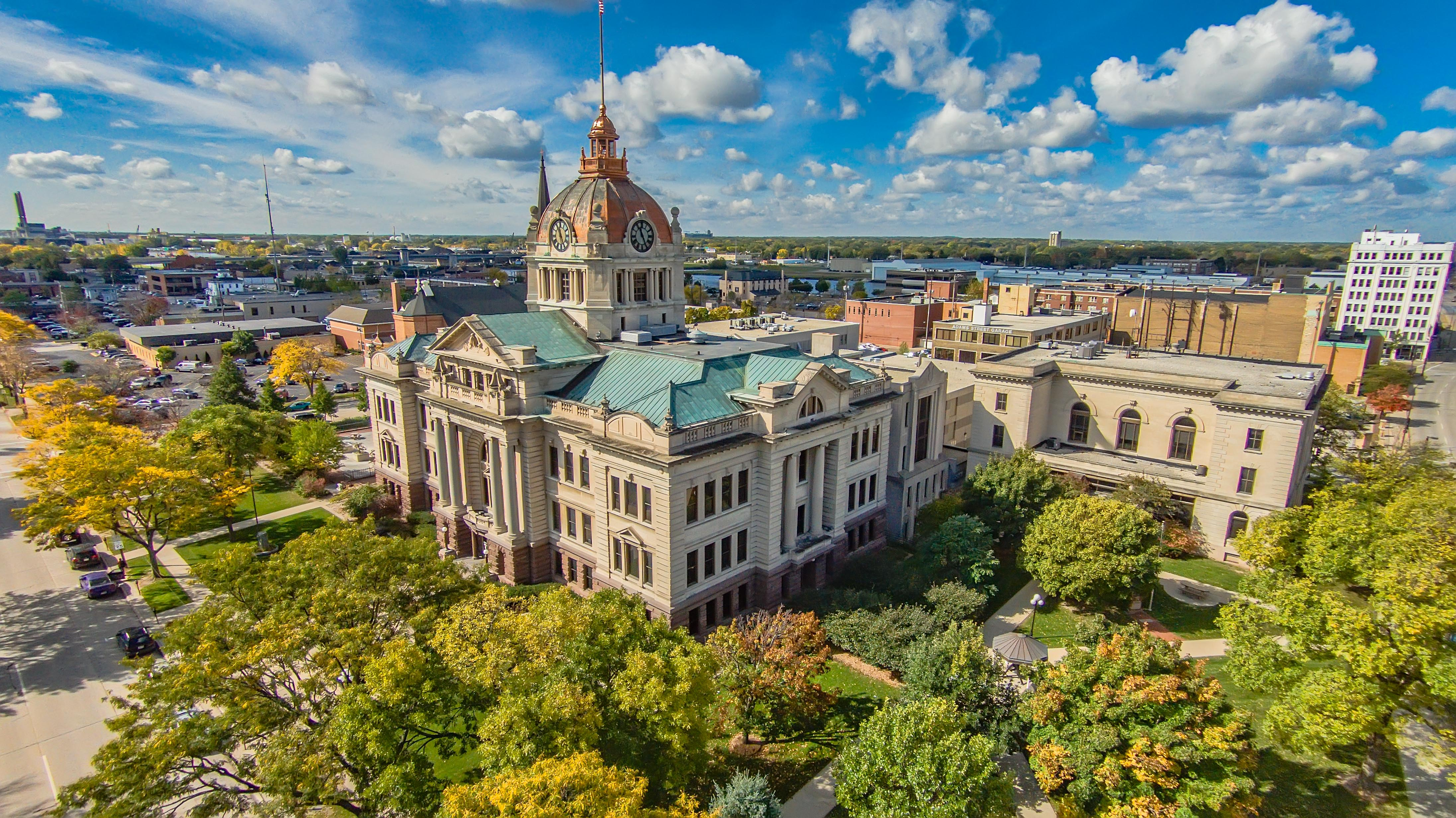
Brown County Courthouse

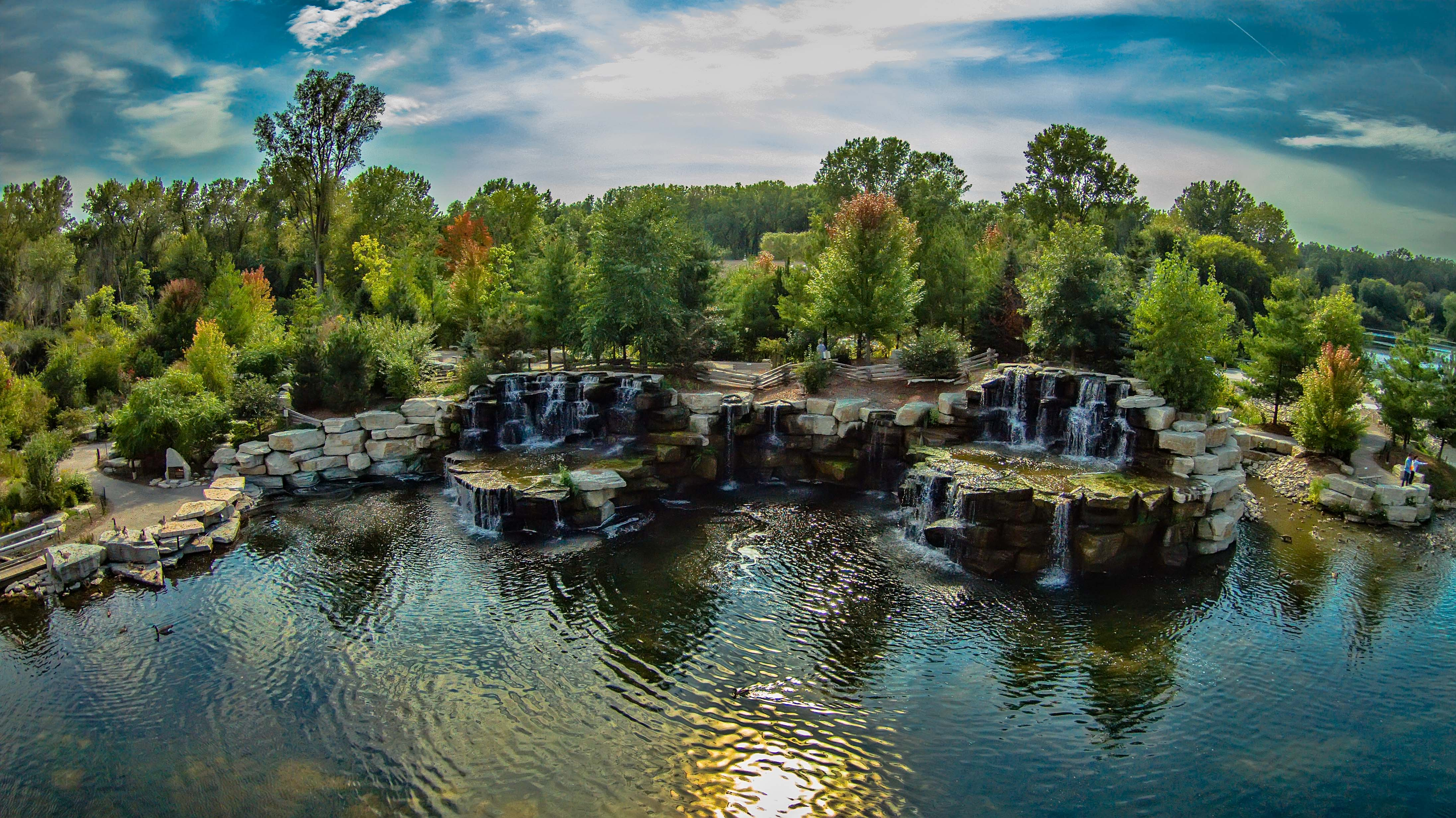
Resch Falls in Bay Beach Wildlife Sanctuary

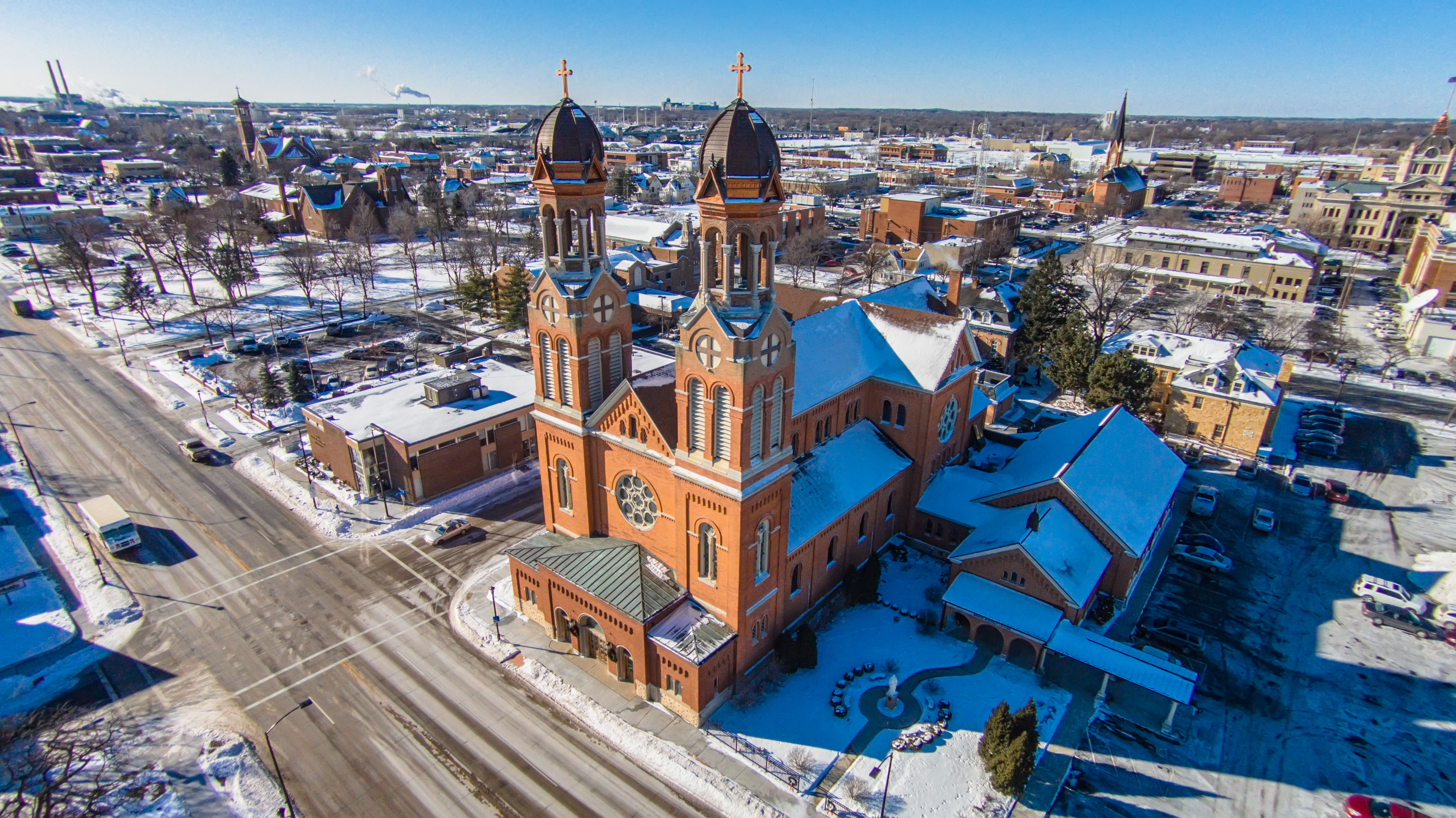
Saint Francis Xavier Cathedral

== History ==
The district was created in the 1972 redistricting act (1971 Wisc. Act 304) which first established the numbered district system, replacing the previous system which allocated districts to specific counties. The 90th district was drawn almost exactly in line with the previous Brown County 1st district (most of the city of Green Bay). The last representative of the Brown County 1st district, Jerome Quinn, went on to win the 1972 election as the first representative of the 90th Assembly district. The district has remained centered on the city of Green Bay in all of the various redistricting schemes since 1972, with the exception of the 1982 court-ordered plan which temporarily moved the district to the area of central Fond du Lac and Winnebago counties. Generally, the city of Green Bay was divided between the 88th and 90th districts, with both districts containing city and suburban precincts, making both districts competitive. That changed in the 2011 redistricting act, which packed more of Green Bay into the 90th district.

Notable former representatives of the 90th district include Eric Genrich, the current mayor of Green Bay.

== List of past representatives ==
List of representatives to the Wisconsin State Assembly from the 90th district
| Member | Party | Residence | Counties represented | Term start | Term end | Ref. |
|---|---|---|---|---|---|---|
District created
| Jerome Quinn | Rep. | Green Bay | Brown | January 1, 1973 | January 6, 1975 | |
| Sharon Metz | Dem. | Green Bay | Brown | January 6, 1975 | January 3, 1983 | |
| Gordon R. Bradley | Rep. | Omro | Fond du Lac, Winnebago | January 3, 1983 | January 7, 1985 | |
| Sharon Metz | Dem. | Green Bay | Brown | January 7, 1985 | January 5, 1987 | |
| Mary Lou E. Van Dreel | Dem. | Ashwaubenon | Brown | January 5, 1987 | January 4, 1993 | |
| John Joseph Ryba | Dem. | Green Bay | Brown | January 4, 1993 | January 5, 2003 | |
| Karl Van Roy | Rep. | Green Bay | Brown | January 5, 2003 | January 7, 2013 | |
| Eric Genrich | Dem. | Green Bay | Brown | January 7, 2013 | January 7, 2019 | |
| Staush Gruszynski | Dem. | Green Bay | Brown | January 7, 2019 | January 4, 2021 | |
| Kristina Shelton | Dem. | Green Bay | Brown | January 4, 2021 | January 6, 2025 | |
| Amaad Rivera-Wagner | Dem. | Green Bay | Brown | January 6, 2025 | Current | |
