= Wisconsin's 44th Assembly district =

American legislative district for Janesville, Wisconsin

Wisconsin's 44th State Assembly district
- 2024 map defined in 2023 Wisc. Act 94; 2022 map defined in Johnson v. Wisconsin Elections Commission; 2011 map was defined in 2011 Wisc. Act 43
Assemblymember
Ann Roe; D–Janesville
since January 6, 2025 (1 years)
- Demographics: 87.03% White; 3.41% Black; 5.3% Hispanic; 1.78% Asian; 1.97% Native American; 0.14% Hawaiian/Pacific Islander
- Population (2020) • Voting age: 59,756; 46,560
- Website: Official website
- Notes: Janesville, Wisconsin

The 44th Assembly district of Wisconsin is one of 99 districts in the Wisconsin State Assembly. Located in southern Wisconsin, the district comprises areas of central Rock County, including most of the city of Janesville and the neighboring village of Footville. It contains the University of Wisconsin–Whitewater at Rock County campus, the Southern Wisconsin Regional Airport, and the main campus of Blackhawk Technical College. The district is represented by Democrat Ann Roe, since January 2025.

The 44th Assembly district is located within Wisconsin's 15th Senate district, along with the 43rd and 45th Assembly districts.

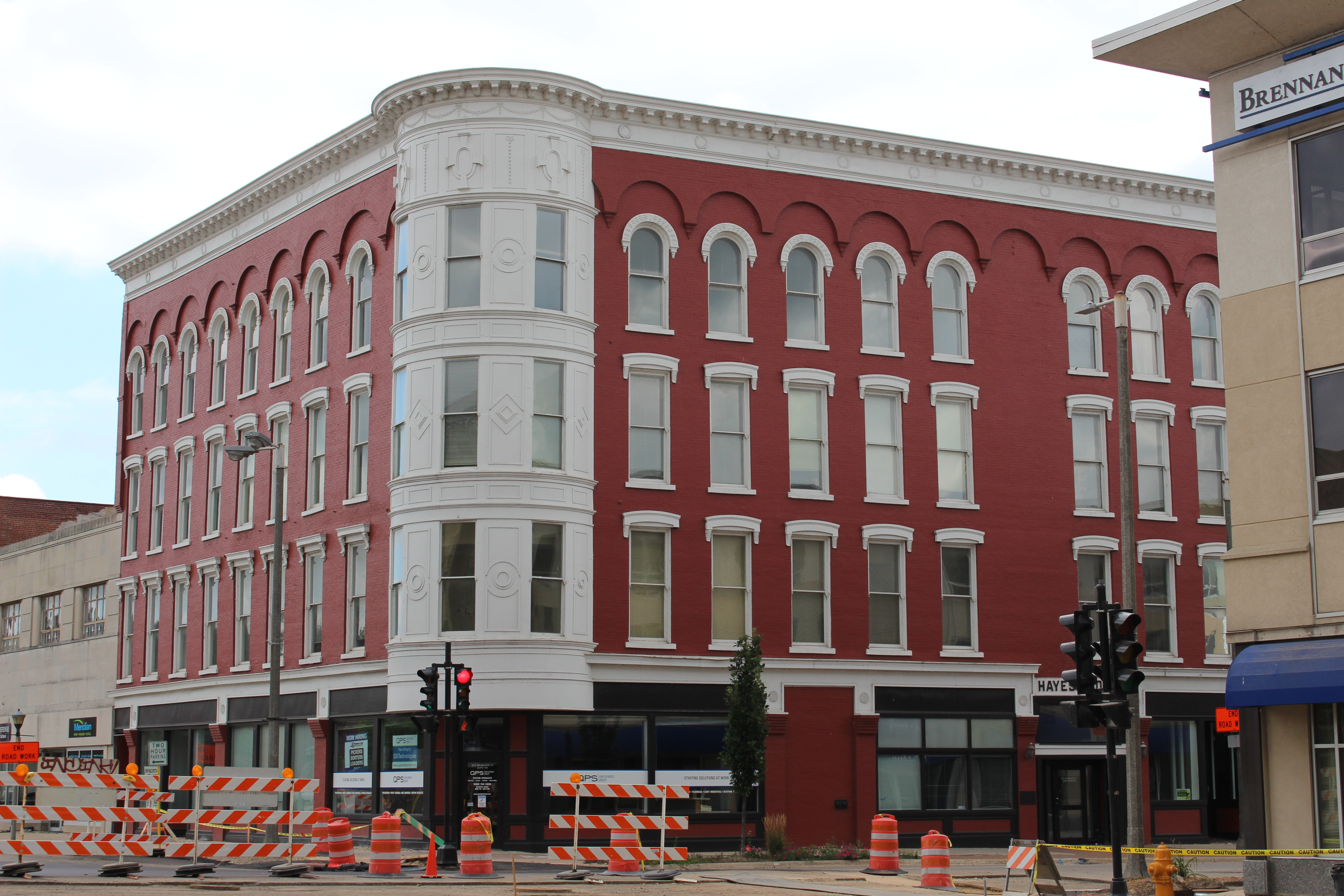
Lappin-Hayes Block in downtown Janesville

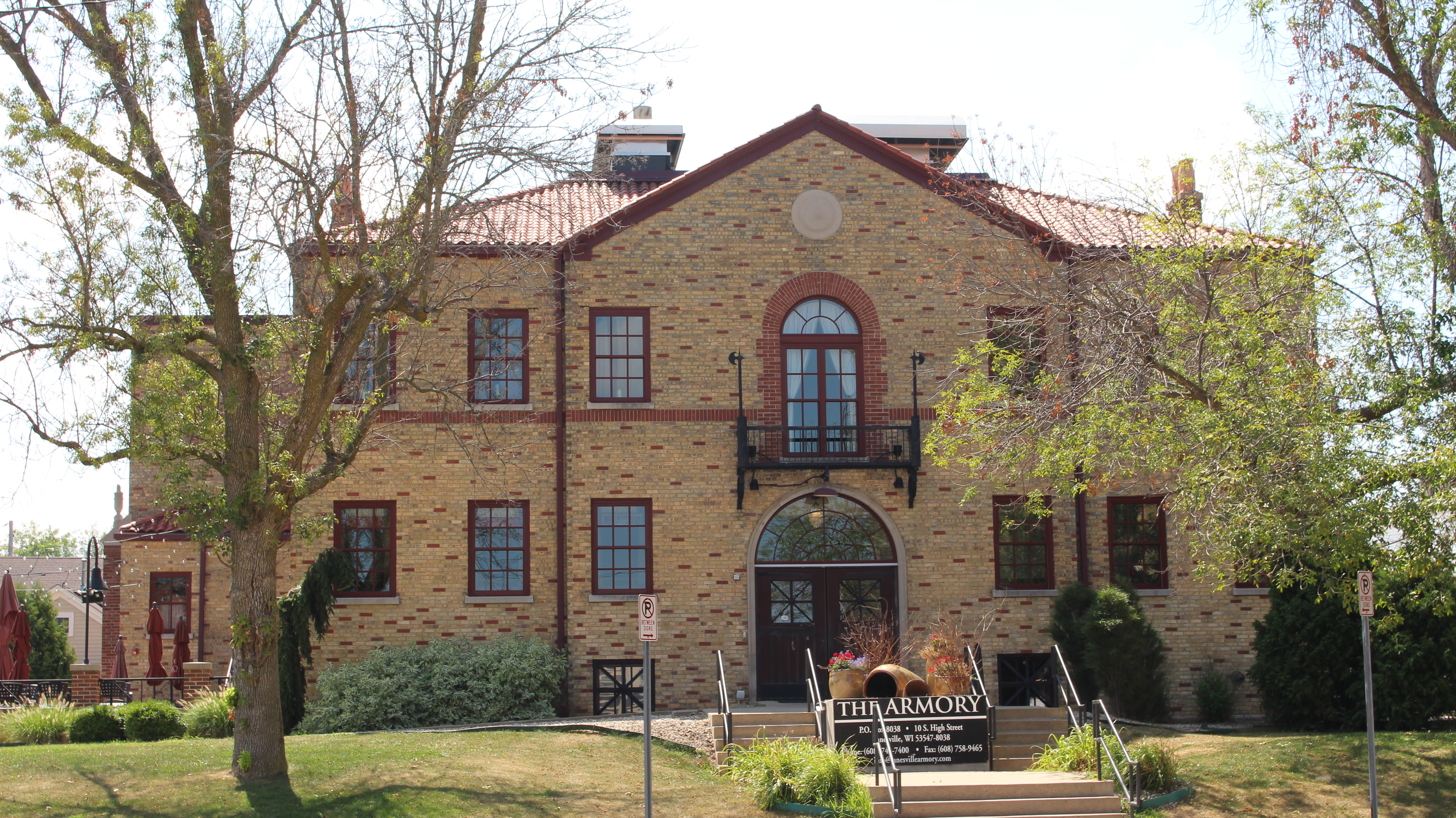
Historic Janesville Armory

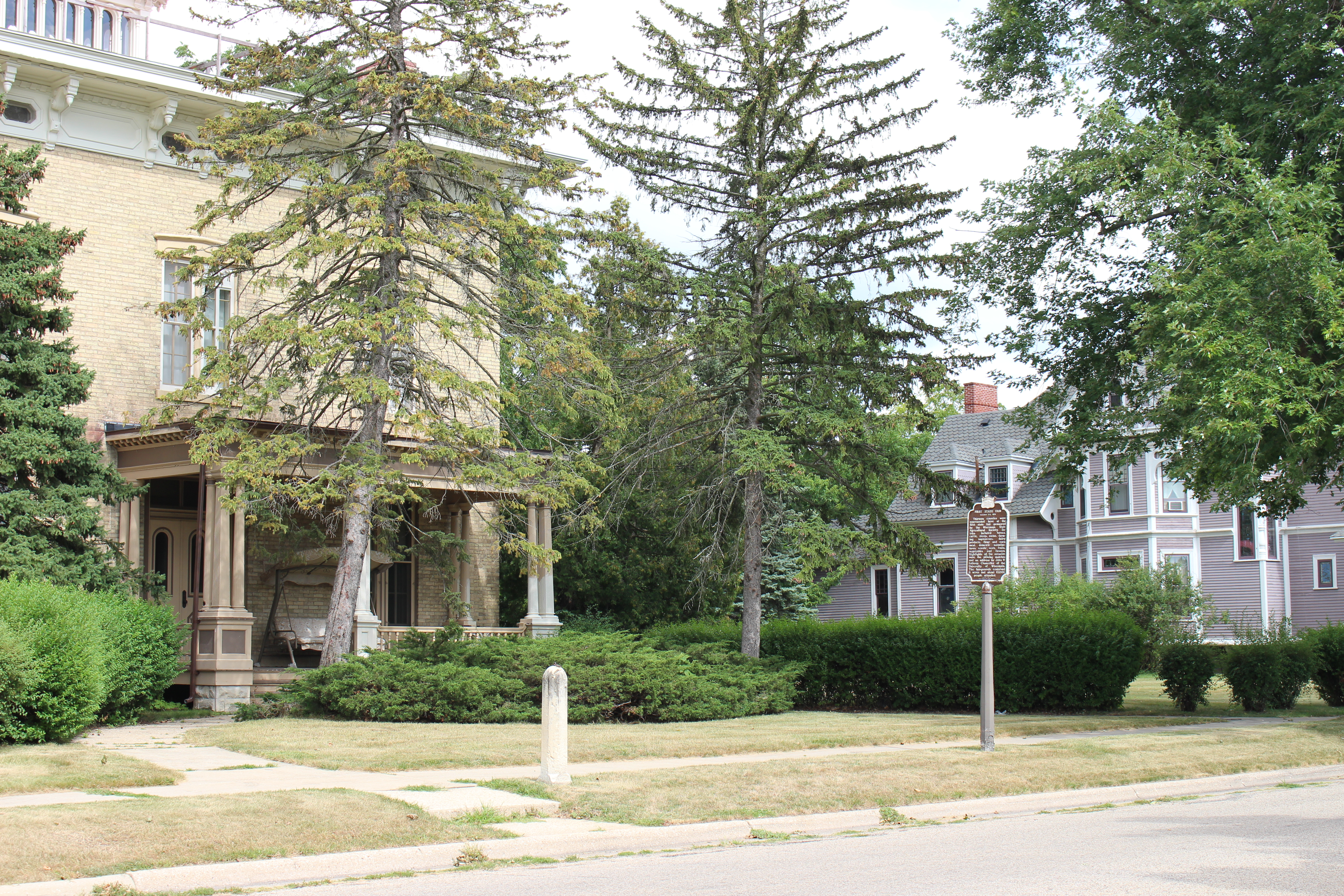
Courthouse Hill Historic District

== History ==
The district was created in the 1972 redistricting act (1971 Wisc. Act 304) which first established the numbered district system, replacing the previous system which allocated districts to specific counties. The 44th district was drawn with novel boundaries, taking the western half of Walworth County—which had been a single-district county in the previous scheme—and part of eastern Rock County, from what had been parts of the 1st and 3rd Rock County districts. The only incumbent representative of the three divided districts who lived in the newly drawn 44th district was Republican Clarence J. Wilger, of the Walworth District. Wilger sought election in the new district, but was defeated in the 1972 Republican primary.

Following the 1982 court-ordered redistricting, which scrambled all State Assembly districts, the 1983 redistricting (1983 Wisc. Act 29) moved the 44th district to its present location, based in the city of Janesville and neighboring towns. The district's boundaries have shrunk further into the city as the population has grown relative to surrounding areas, the 2002 redistricting was the first to put the boundaries of the district entirely within the city of Janesville.

== List of past representatives ==
List of representatives to the Wisconsin State Assembly from the 44th district
Member	Party	Residence	Counties represented	Term start	Term end	Ref.
District created
Delmar DeLong	Rep.	Clinton	Rock, Walworth	January 1, 1973	January 3, 1983	
Mark D. Lewis	Dem.	Eau Claire	Eau Claire	January 3, 1983	January 7, 1985	
Wayne W. Wood	Dem.	Janesville	Rock	January 7, 1985	January 3, 2005	
Michael J. Sheridan	Dem.	Janesville	Rock	January 3, 2005	January 3, 2011	
Joe Knilans	Rep.	Janesville	Rock	January 3, 2011	January 7, 2013	
Debra Kolste	Dem.	Janesville	Rock	January 7, 2013	January 4, 2021	
Sue S. Conley	Dem.	Janesville	Rock	January 4, 2021	January 6, 2025	
Ann Roe	Dem.	Janesville	Rock	January 6, 2025	Current	
