= John Joseph Ryba =

American politician (1929-2021)

Member of the Wisconsin State Assembly from the 90th district
- In office January 4, 1993 – January 5, 2003
- Preceded by: Mary Lou E. Van Dreel
- Succeeded by: Karl Van Roy

Personal details
- Born: John Joseph Ryba Jr. August 10, 1929 Chicago, Illinois, U.S.
- Died: January 9, 2021 (aged 91) De Pere, Wisconsin, U.S.
- Resting place: Fort Howard Memorial Park, Green Bay, Wisconsin
- Party: Democratic
- Spouse: Gertrude Styczynski (m. 1954–2021)
- Children: 3

Military service
- Allegiance: United States
- Branch/service: United States Army; U.S. Army Reserve
- Years of service: 1951–1953 (USA); 1953–1961 (USAR)
- Rank: Sergeant
- Battles/wars: Korean War

John Joseph Ryba Jr. (August 10, 1929 – January 9, 2021) was an American politician and public administrator. A Democrat, he was a member of the Wisconsin State Assembly for 10 years (1993–2003), representing Green Bay.

== Biography ==
Ryba was born on August 10, 1929, in Chicago, Illinois. He graduated from Thomas Kelly High School, in Chicago, and, in March 1951, was drafted into the United States Army for service in the Korean War. After the war he remained in the United States Army Reserve.

== Political career ==
Ryba was first elected to the Assembly in 1992. He was also a member of the Brown County Board of Supervisors and the Green Bay City Council from 1970 to 1993.

== Personal life and family ==
John Ryba married Gertrude Styczynski on October 9, 1954. They had three children together. At the time of John's death, in 2021, he was survived by his wife, three children, seven grandchildren, and ten great grandchildren.

Wisconsin State Assembly
Preceded by Mary Lou E. Van Dreel	Member of the Wisconsin State Assembly from the 90th district January 4, 1993 – January 5, 2003	Succeeded by Karl Van Roy
