= Bay Beach Wildlife Sanctuary =

Park in Green Bay, Wisconsin, United States

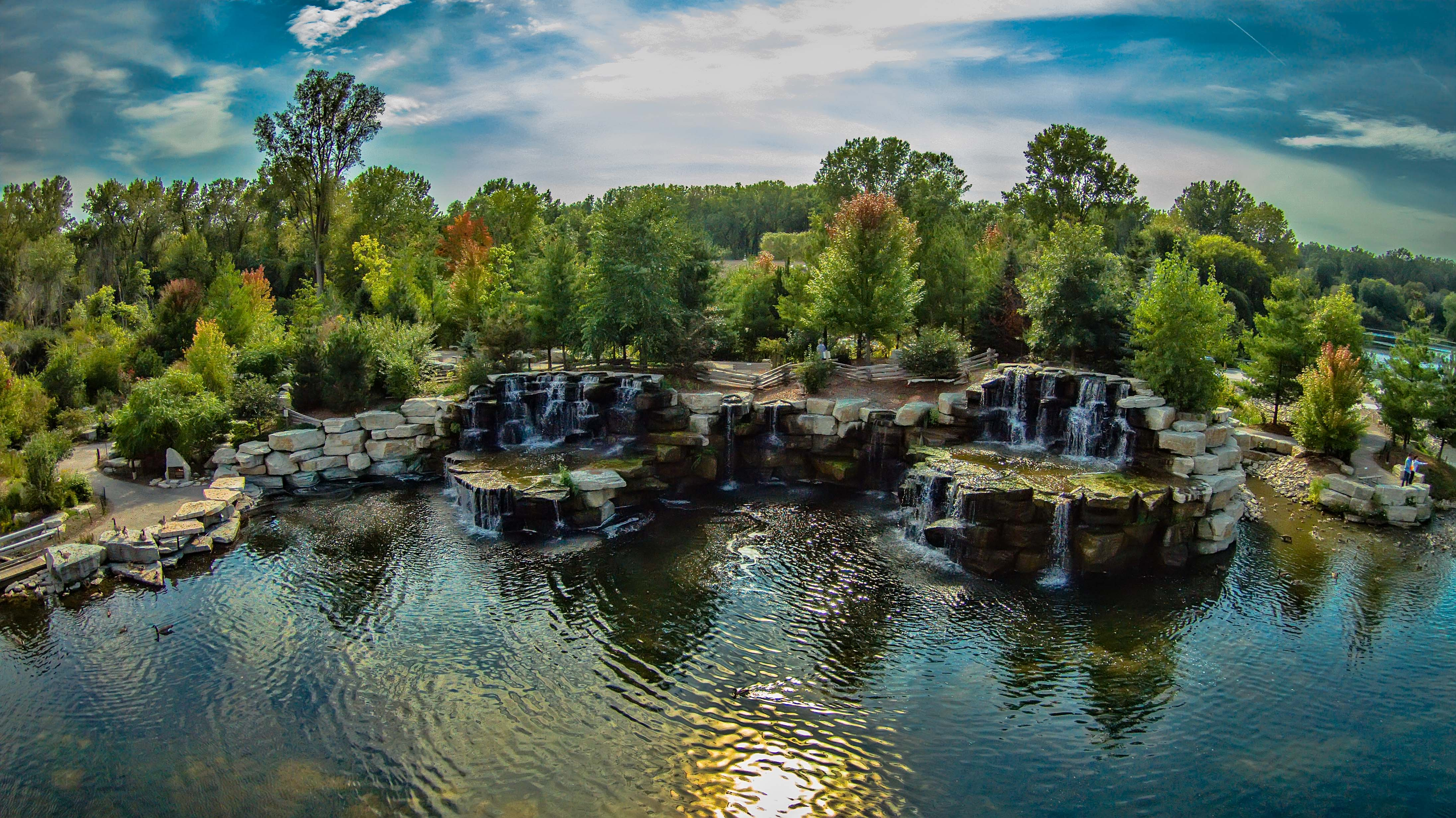
- Resch waterfalls

- Location within Wisconsin Location within the United States
- Location: Green Bay, Wisconsin
- Coordinates: 44°31′34″N 87°58′23″W
- Area: 700 acres (280 ha)
- Created: 1936
- Website: Official website

The Bay Beach Wildlife Sanctuary is a 600-acre municipal urban wildlife refuge. It is the largest park in the Green Bay, Wisconsin Park system and home to the second largest wildlife rehabilitation program in Wisconsin. Facilities include a nature education center, observation building, hiking trails, woodland building and numerous animal habitats. The sanctuary is adjacent to the Bay Beach Amusement Park.

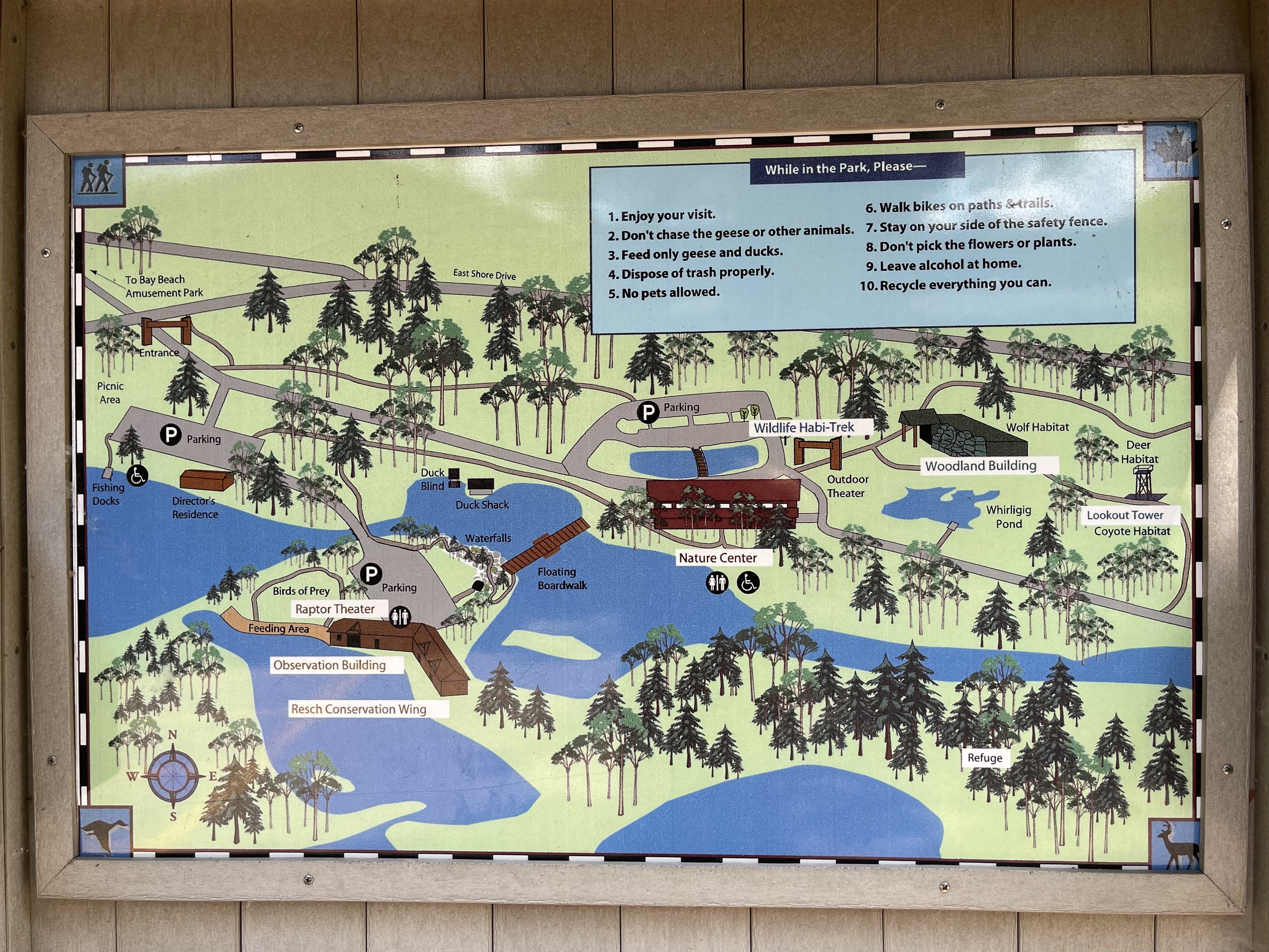
Bay Beach Wildlife Sanctuary Map, Green Bay, Wisconsin

== History ==
In 1929, the City of Green Bay purchased 250 acres near the Bay Beach Amusement Park with the intent of building a golf course. In the following decades, citizens developed the concept of a wildlife refuge with guidance from Aldo Leopold. In 1941, the Parks, Recreation, and Forestry Department took over the operation. In 1985, the Nature Education Center opened with the help of private donations totaling $1.7 million. The sanctuary celebrated its 80th anniversary in 2015.

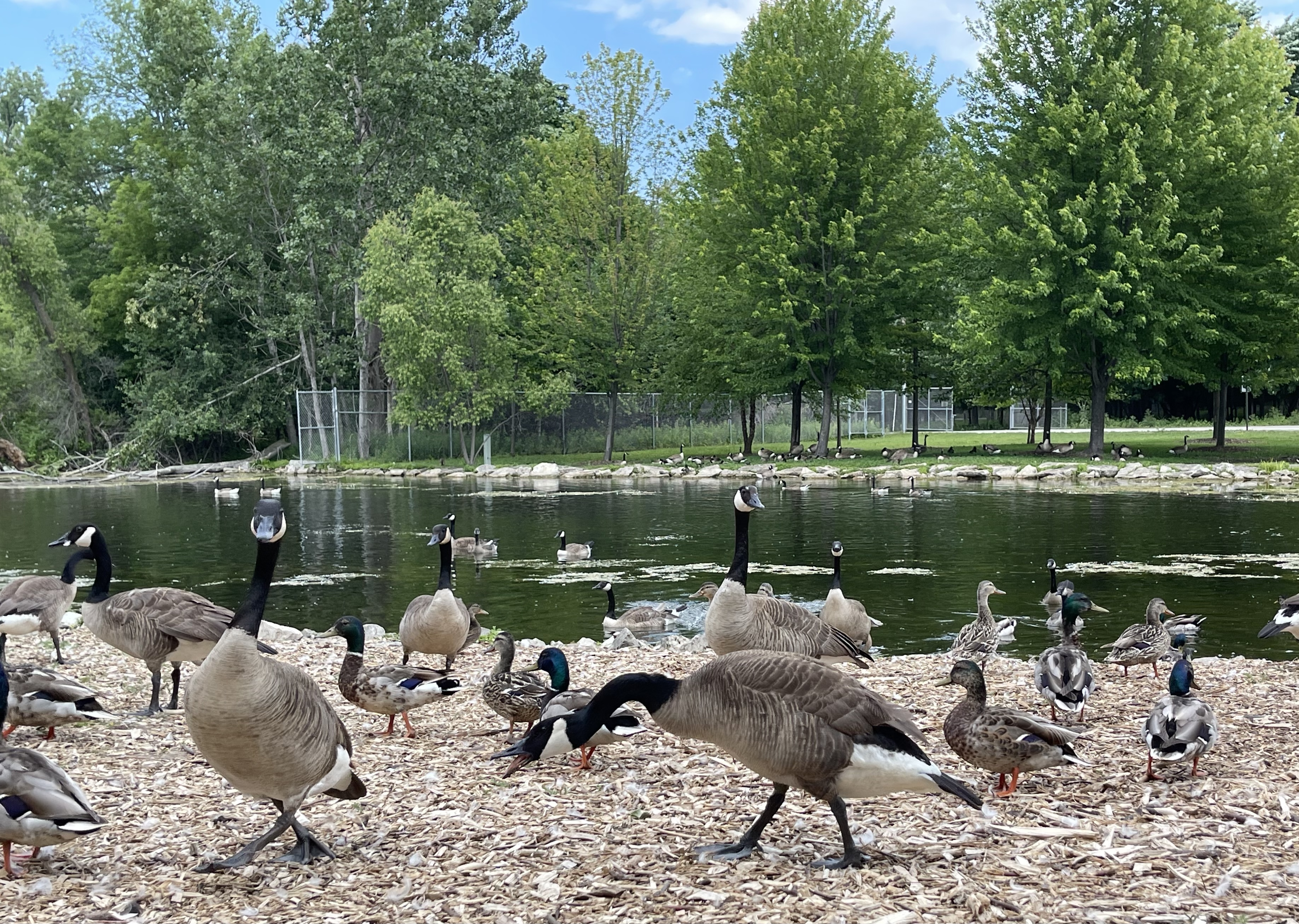
Ducks and geese at the Bay Beach Sanctuary.

== Facilities and operations ==
The Bay Beach Wildlife Sanctuary is free and open to the public year-round. The park receives many sick and injured wild animals, and their goal is to rehabilitate them and return them to the wild. The animals who cannot survive in the wild are given a safe and permanent home in one of the many buildings on the sanctuary's campus. The sanctuary's collection includes many animals native to Wisconsin, including foxes, bobcats, wolves, and various small mammals and birds.

The park provides a number of environmental education opportunities for school groups and other members of the community. The Oak Learning Center is a 4K kindergarten program located at the Bay Beach Wildlife Sanctuary and sponsored by the Green Bay Area Public School District.

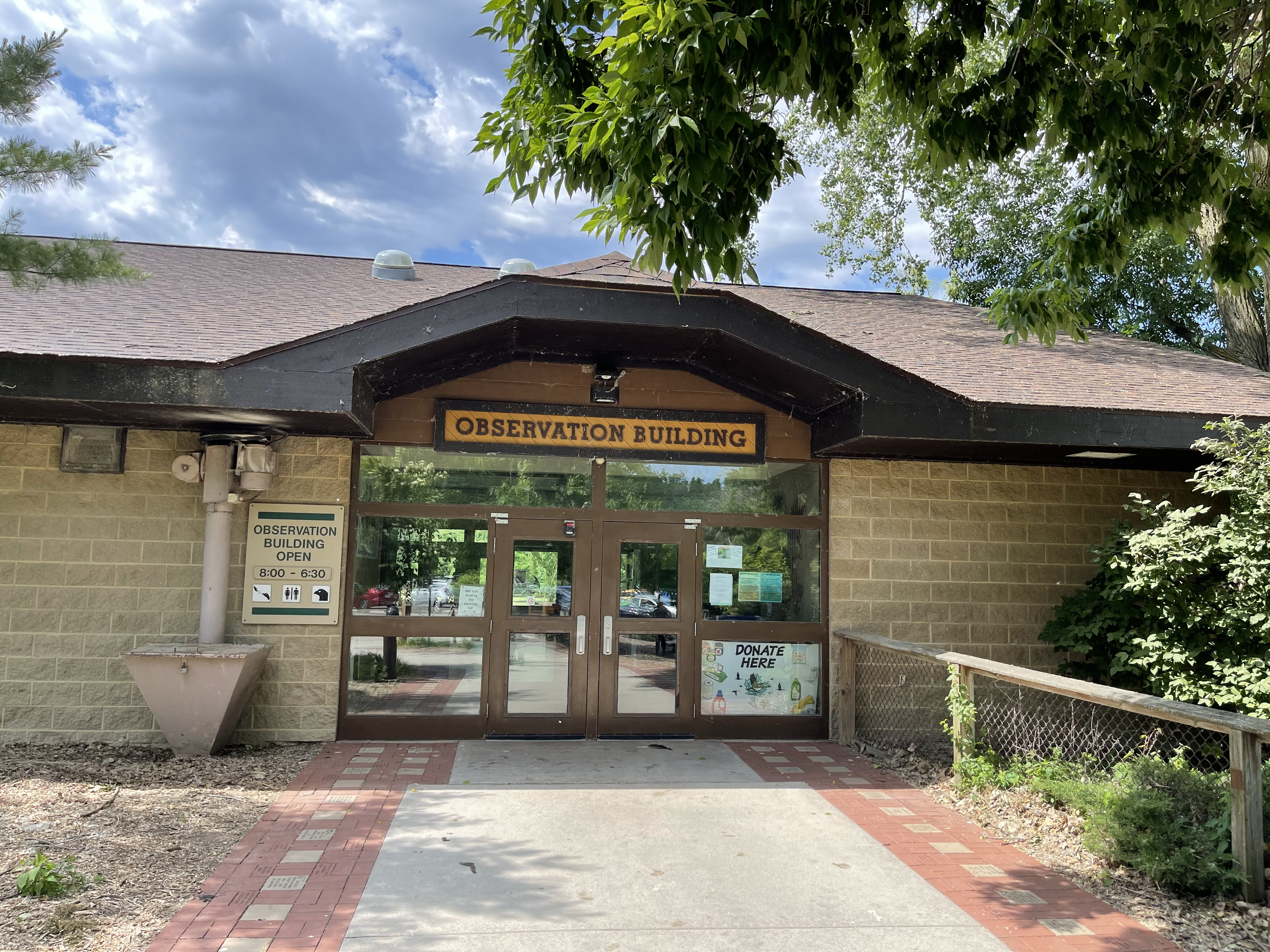
The Observation Building at the Bay Beach Wildlife Sanctuary, Green Bay, Wisconsin

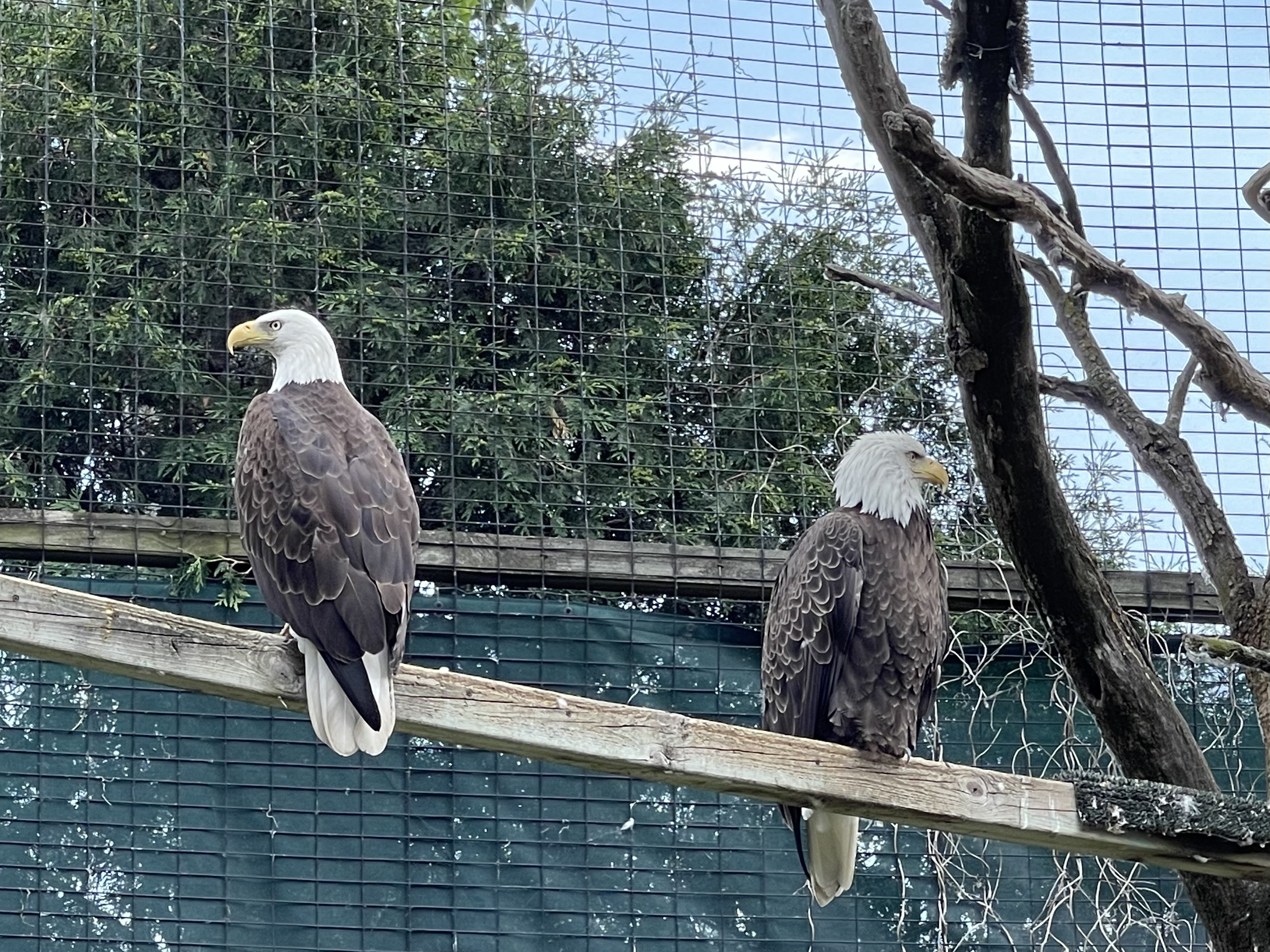
Many wildlife are on display at Bay Beach Wildlife Sanctuary, Green Bay, Wisconsin

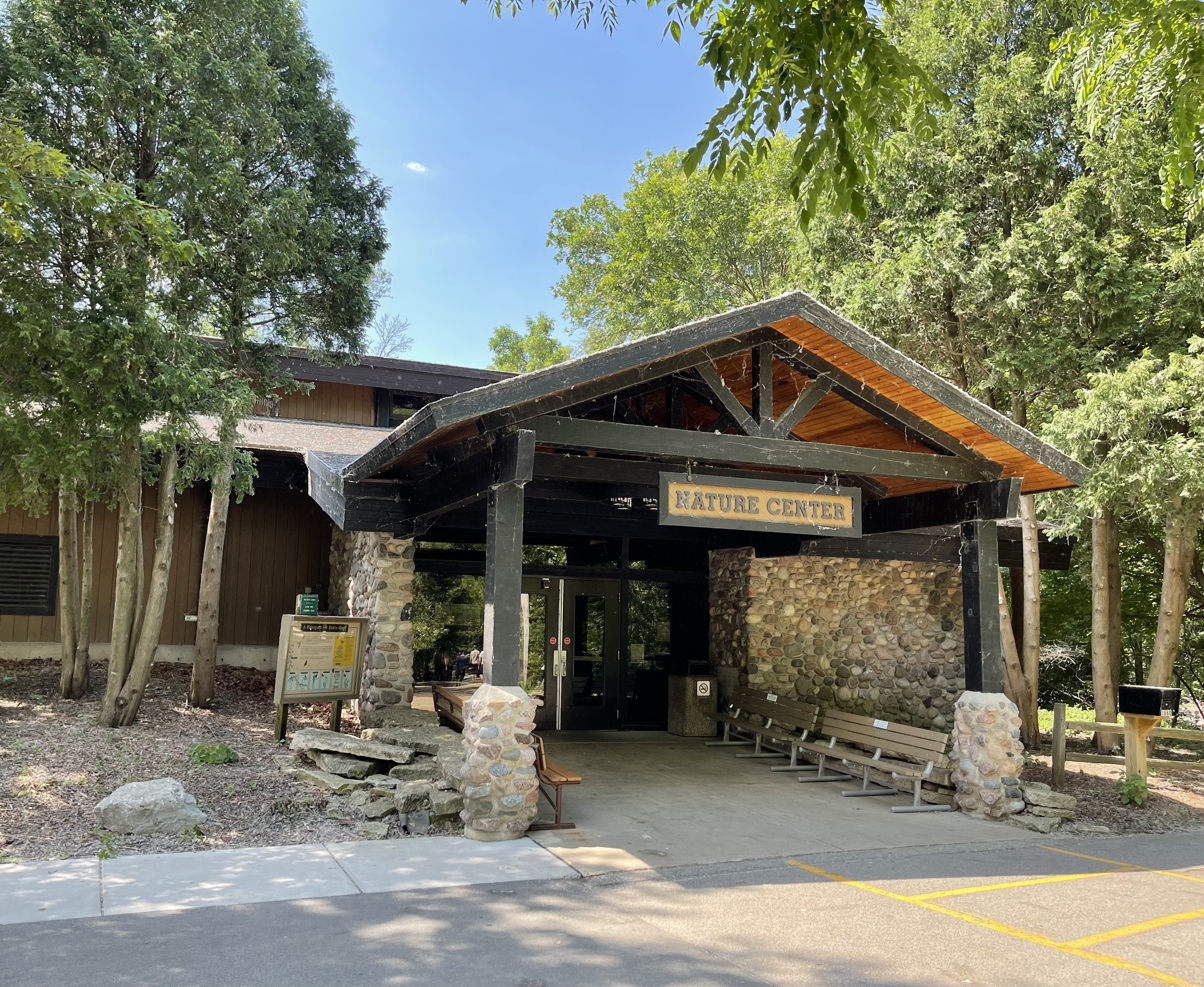
The Nature Center at the Bay Beach Wildlife Sanctuary, Green Bay, Wisconsin

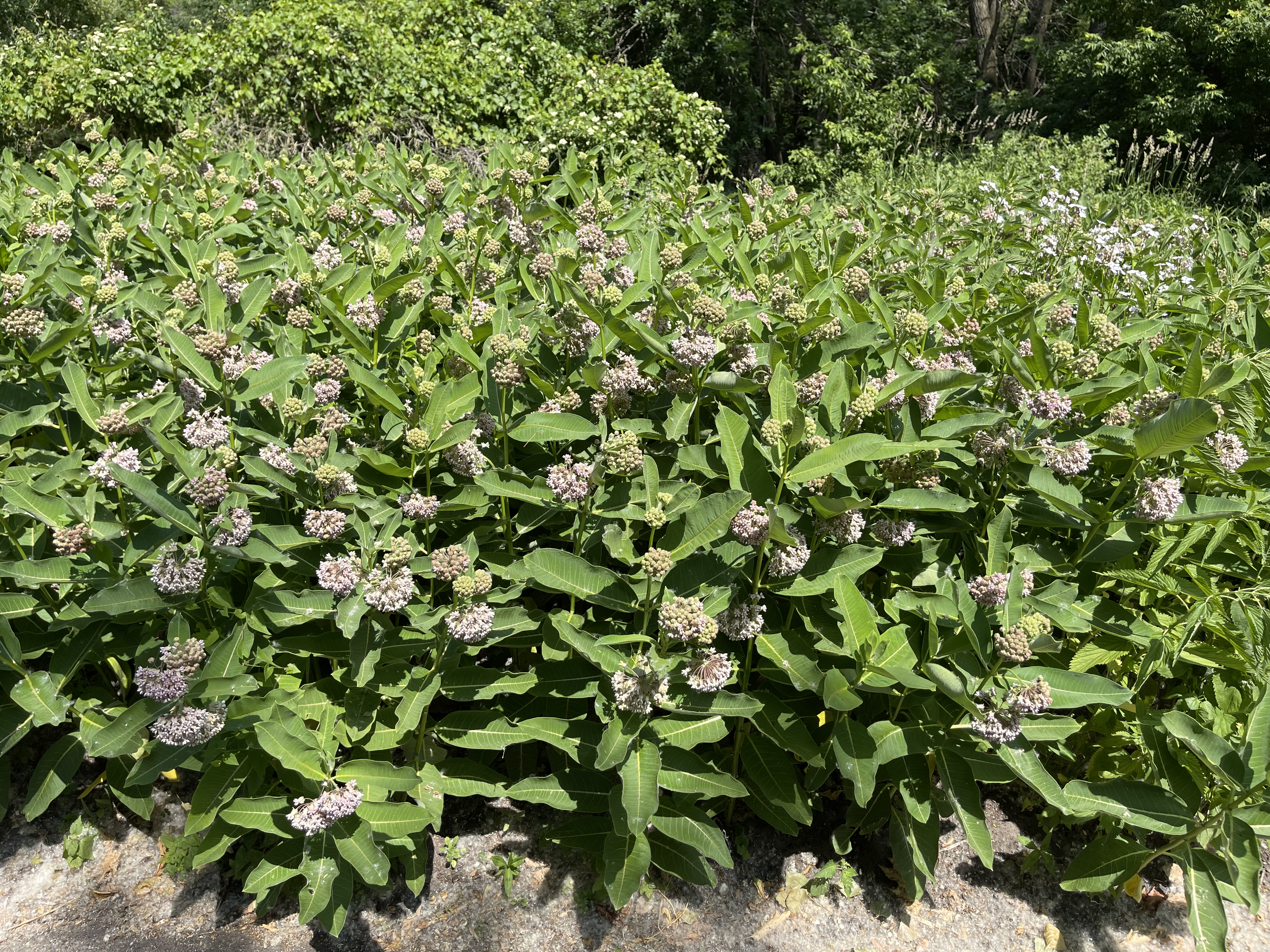
A luxuriant stand of milkweed at the Bay Beach Wildlife Sanctuary
