= Debra Kolste =

American Democratic politician (b. 1953)

Member of the Wisconsin State Assembly from the 44th district
- In office January 7, 2013 – January 4, 2021
- Preceded by: Joe Knilans
- Succeeded by: Sue Conley

President of the Janesville School Board
- In office 2007–2008

Member of the Janesville School Board
- In office 2000–2009

Personal details
- Born: Debra Ann Babl; June 20, 1953 (age 73) O'Neill, Nebraska
- Party: Democratic
- Spouse: Rex J. Kolste (died 2020)
- Children: 3
- Education: University of Nebraska–Lincoln (B.S.)
- Profession: politician
- Website: Official website

Debra Ann "Deb" Kolste (née Babl; born June 20, 1953) is an American business owner and politician. A Democrat, she was a member of the Wisconsin State Assembly from 2013 to 2021, representing the Janesville-based 44th assembly district.

== Early life and career ==
Debra Kolste was born in the small city of O'Neill, Nebraska. She was co-valedictorian on her graduation from Kimball County High School. She went on to study at the University of Nebraska–Lincoln and received her bachelor's degree in medical technology in 1975.

She and her husband, Rex, a medical doctor, moved to Colby, Kansas, where they started a medical clinic. In 1984, they purchased a grain farm in Colby, which Kolste still owns and operates. In 1994, they sold their clinic in Colby and moved to Janesville, Wisconsin, where they both were employed by Mercy Health. Since then, Kolste has been employed as a medical technologist in the Mercy Health system.

In Janesville, Kolste quickly became involved in local school affairs as her children matriculated through the Janesville public schools. She joined the parent–teacher association and, in 2000, she was elected to the local School Board. She served three three-year terms on the board, leaving office in 2009; she was president of the board for the 2007–2008 session.

== Political career ==
In 2012, Kolste announced she would be a candidate for Wisconsin State Assembly in the Janesville-based 44th assembly district. She hoped to challenge incumbent first-term Republican state representative Joe Knilans in the general election. First, however, she had to surmount the crowded Democratic primary field, which included city councilmember Sam Liebert, school board member Kevin Murray, and former city councilmember Yuri Rashkin. In the August primary, she prevailed with 42% of the vote. The general election dealt with the issues of a mining bill, which may have had an impact on the Janesville economy, and the state's implementation of the federal Affordable Care Act. Kolste went on to win a substantial victory over Knilans in the general election, with 61% of the vote. Kolste won reelection in 2014 and was unopposed in 2016 and 2018.

In February 2020, Kolste announced she would retire from the Assembly at the end of the 2019–2020 term. Kolste endorsed her friend, Sue Conley, to replace her in the Assembly, and Conley was elected later that year. Tragically, Kolste's husband, Rex, died unexpectedly two months after she announced her retirement.

== Personal life and family ==
Debra Ann Babl took the name Kolste when she married Dr. Rex J. Kolste, who she met while they were both undergraduate students at the University of Nebraska–Lincoln. Dr. Kolste, at age 66, died of a heart attack in April 2020. Rex had suffered his first heart attack at age 50, in 2004, after which they began recreational biking and practiced yoga. From her marriage with Dr. Kolste, Deb has three adult children, Drew, Ali, and Tori, and three grandchildren. She resides in Janesville, Wisconsin.

== Electoral history ==
=== Wisconsin Assembly (2012) ===
Wisconsin Assembly, 44th District Election, 2012
Party	Candidate	Votes	%	±%
Democratic Primary, August 14, 2012
Democratic	Debra Kolste	1,926	42.09%	
Democratic	Kevin M. Murray	1,610	35.18%	
Democratic	Yuri Rashkin	705	15.41%	
Democratic	Sam Liebert	335	7.32%	
Plurality		316	6.91%	
Total votes		4,576	100.0%	
General Election, November 6, 2012
Democratic	Debra Kolste	16,983	61.54%	+13.09%
Republican	Joe Knilans (incumbent)	10,571	38.30%	−13.20%
	Scattering	43	0.16%	
Plurality		6,412	30.63%	+20.18%
Total votes		27,597	100.0%	+63.66%
Democratic gain from Republican		Swing	26.29%	

=== Wisconsin Assembly (2014) ===
Wisconsin Assembly, 44th District Election, 2014
Party	Candidate	Votes	%	±%
General Election, November 4, 2014
Democratic	Debra Kolste (incumbent)	13,354	67.95%	+6.41%
Republican	Jacob Dorsey	6,298	32.05%	−6.26%
Plurality		7,056	35.90%	+12.67%
Total votes		19,652	100.0%	-28.79%
Democratic hold				

Wisconsin State Assembly
Preceded by Joe Knilans	Member of the Wisconsin State Assembly from the 44th district January 7, 2013 – January 4, 2021	Succeeded by Sue Conley
