= School District of Janesville =

School district in Rock County, Wisconsin, United States

Address
- 527 S Franklin St Janesville, Wisconsin, 53548; United States

District information
- Grades: PK–12
- Schools: 22
- NCES District ID: 5507020

Students and staff
- Students: 9,414 (2023–24)
- Teachers: 761.74 (on an FTE basis)
- Student–teacher ratio: 12.36:1

Other information
- Website: www.janesville.k12.wi.us

School District of Janesville (SDJ) is a school district headquartered in the Educational Services Center (ESC) in Janesville, Wisconsin. As of 2020 the district has 10,300 students in grades PK-12 and more than 1,500 employees. With 21 campuses it is the state's tenth largest school district.

== Schools ==
- Middle and high schools
  - TAGOS Leadership Academy (charter school)
- High schools
  - Joseph A. Craig High School
  - Janesville International Education Program
  - George S. Parker High School
  - Rock River Charter School (charter school)
  - Rock University High School (charter school)
- Middle schools
  - Edison Middle School
  - Franklin Middle School
  - Marshall Middle School
- Elementary schools
  - Adams Elementary School
  - Harrison Elementary School
  - Jackson Elementary School
  - Jefferson Elementary School
  - Kennedy Elementary School
  - Lincoln Elementary School
  - Madison Elementary School
  - Monroe Elementary School
  - Roosevelt Elementary School
  - Van Buren Elementary School
  - Washington Elementary School
  - Wilson Elementary School
- Preschool
  - Preschool 4 Janesville (P4J)
- Virtual school
  - Arise Virtual Academy (charter school)
