= Green Bay Area Public School District =

Public school district for Green Bay, Wisconsin

Location
- 200 South Broadway; Green Bay, Wisconsin; United States Green Bay and surrounding suburbs United States

District information
- Type: Public
- Motto: Engagement. Equity. Excellence.
- Grades: PK - 12
- Established: 1856
- Superintendent: Michael Hernandez
- Schools: 37
- Budget: $313 million (2025-2026)

Students and staff
- Students: 17,956
- Staff: 3,700+

Other information
- Website: www.gbaps.org

Sale School

Green Bay Area Public School District (GBAPS) is the third-largest school district in Wisconsin. As of the 2025–26 school year, GBAPS serves 17,956 students in 37 schools and had 3,641 full-time equivalent (FTE) staff positions. A publicly elected school board, the Green Bay Area Public School Board of Education, provides direction and oversight, with a superintendent heading the organization's administration.

Green Bay Area Public Schools' offerings include neighborhood schools, specialty schools, and charter schools serving students as young as age 3 through grade 12.

The district was founded in 1856 with the founding of the first public school, Sale School. Sale School has since been demolished.

== Programs ==
Specialty programs in GBAPS include arts schools such as Green Bay East High School's Fine Arts Academy; alternative instruction such as Aldo Leopold Community School, Dr. Rosa Minoka-Hill School, and the Northeast Wisconsin School of innovation; charter schools including the John Dewey Academy of Learning; and International Baccalaureate schools such as Green Bay West High School.

A multitude of 4K and other early education programs are also offered by the district, as well as after-school programs.

== Performance ==
In general, both English Language Arts Achievement and Mathematics Achievement are below the state average according to the Wisconsin Department of Public Instruction's latest district report card, showing that the district received a 47.6/100 score compared to the state's 62.3/100 score. These issues are complicated by 59.4% of students who are classified as Economically Disadvantaged, in addition to 22.3% who are considered English Learners.

Absenteeism and Dropout Rates sit within the state's goal for the district of less than 13%, and less than 6% respectively, with the actual rates being 10.6% and 2.8%.

== Head Start Learning Centers ==
- Head Start Learning Center
- Jefferson Head Start Learning Center
- OAK Learning Center

== Elementary schools ==
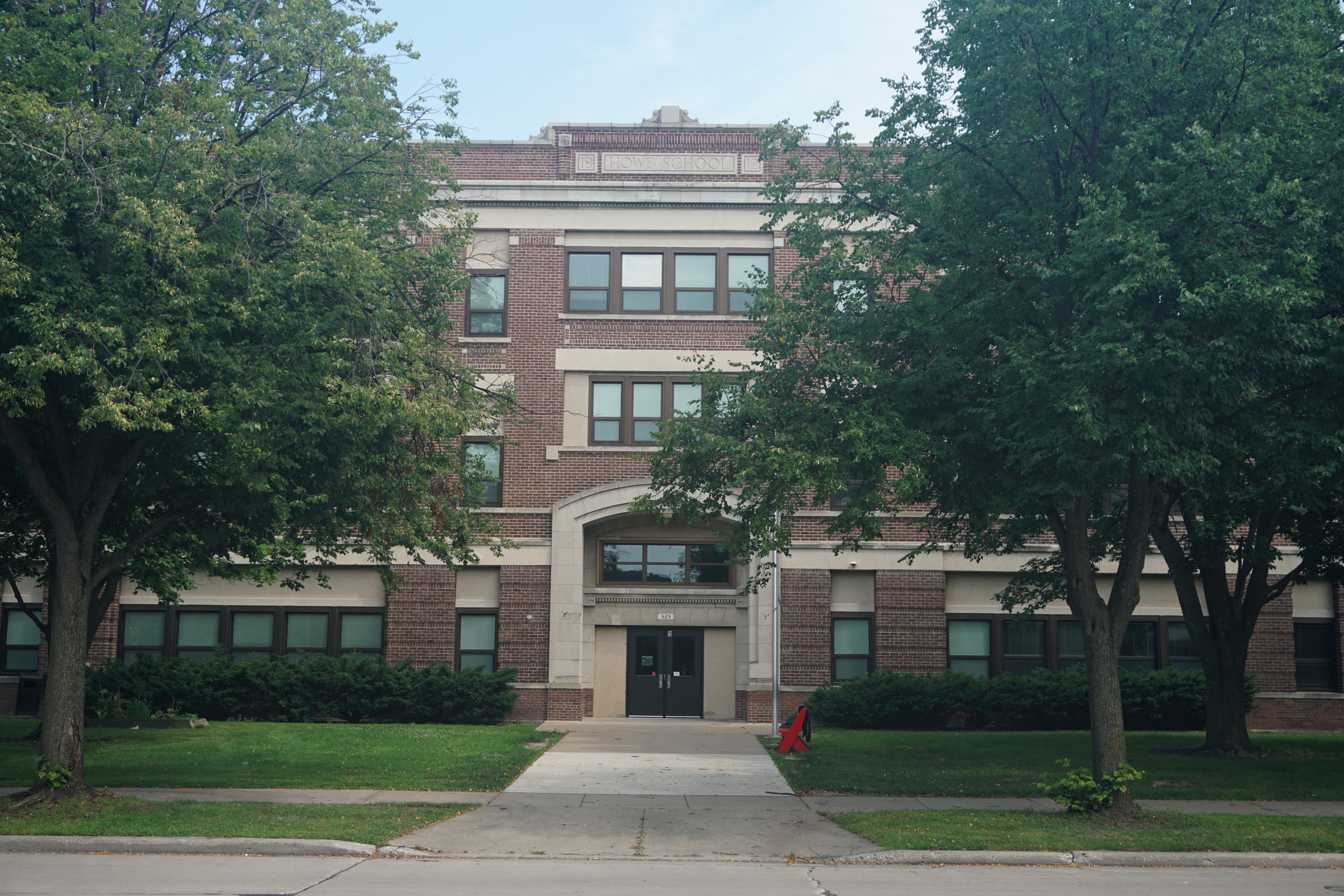
Howe Elementary School

- Aldo Leopold Community School (4-8)
- Baird Elementary School
- Beaumont Elementary School
- Chappell Elementary School
- Danz Elementary School
- Doty Elementary School
- Eisenhower Elementary School
- Fort Howard Elementary School
- Howe Elementary School
- Jackson Elementary School
- King Elementary School
- Lincoln Elementary School
- Martin Elementary School
- McAuliffe Elementary School
- Nicolet Elementary School
- Starr Elementary School
- Sullivan Elementary School
- Webster Elementary School
- Wilder Elementary School

== Middle schools ==
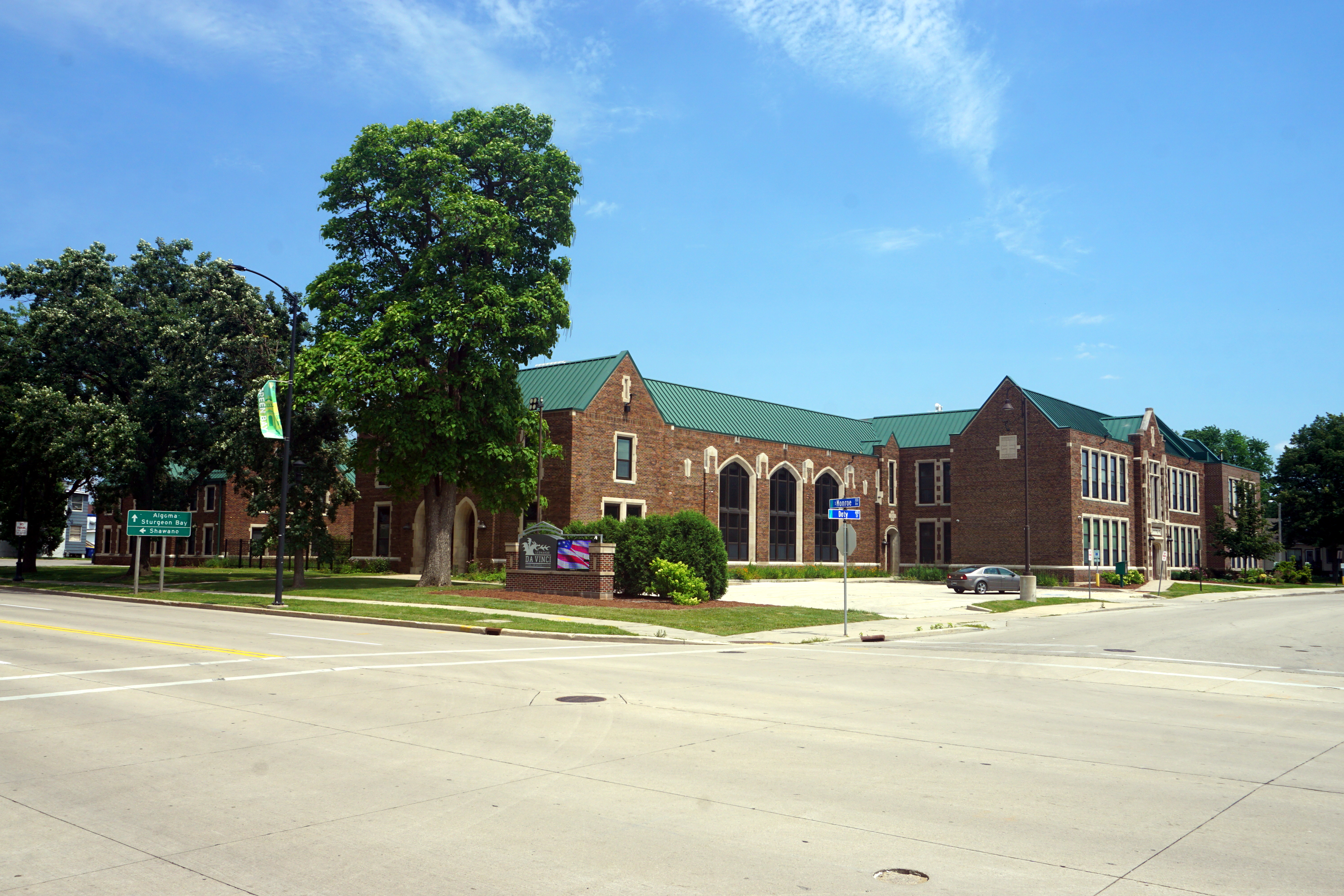
Leonardo da Vinci School for Gifted Learners

- Edison Middle School
- Franklin Middle School
- Leonardo da Vinci School for Gifted Learners (K-8)
- Lombardi Middle School
- Red Smith School (K-8)
- Washington Middle School

== High schools ==
- Green Bay East High School
- Green Bay Southwest High School
- Green Bay West High School
- Preble High School
- John Dewey Academy of Learning(6-12)
- Northeast Wisconsin School of Innovation (charter)

== Alternative schools ==
- Dr. Rosa Minoka-Hill School
