= 101st Wisconsin Legislature =

Wisconsin legislative term for 2013–2014

←	100th	102nd	→
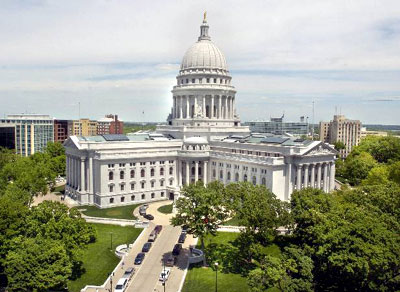
- Wisconsin State Capitol

Overview
- Legislative body: Wisconsin Legislature
- Meeting place: Wisconsin State Capitol
- Term: January 7, 2013 – January 5, 2015
- Election: November 6, 2012

Senate
- Members: 33
- Senate President: Michael G. Ellis (R)
- President pro tempore: Joseph K. Leibham (R) ^{until Dec. 1, 2014}
- Party control: Republican

Assembly
- Members: 99
- Assembly Speaker: Robin Vos (R)
- Speaker pro tempore: Tyler August (R)
- Party control: Republican

Sessions
- Regular: January 7, 2013 – January 5, 2015

Special sessions
- Oct. 2013 Spec.: October 10, 2013 – November 12, 2013
- Dec. 2013 Spec.: December 2, 2013 – December 19, 2013
- Jan. 2014 Spec.: January 23, 2014 – March 20, 2014

The One Hundred First Wisconsin Legislature convened from January 7, 2013, through January 5, 2015, in regular session, though it adjourned for legislative activity on May 21, 2014. The legislature also held three special sessions during this legislative term.

This was the first legislative session after the redistricting of the Senate and Assembly according to an act of the previous session.

Senators representing even-numbered districts were newly elected for this session and were serving the first two years of a four-year term. Assembly members were elected to a two-year term. Assembly members and even-numbered senators were elected in the general election of November 6, 2012. Senators representing odd-numbered districts were serving the third and fourth year of their four-year term, having been elected in the general election held on November 2, 2010.

The governor of Wisconsin during this entire term was Republican Scott Walker, of Milwaukee County, serving the second two years of a four-year term, having won election in the 2010 Wisconsin gubernatorial election.

== Major events ==
- January 20, 2013: Second inauguration of Barack Obama as President of the United States.
- February 28, 2013: Pope Benedict XVI resigned the papacy, becoming the first pope to resign in 600 years.
- March 13, 2013: The 2013 papal conclave elected Cardinal Jorge Mario Bergoglio as the next pope, he then took the papal name Pope Francis.
- April 15, 2013: Two Chechnya-born terrorists carried out a bombing at the 2013 Boston Marathon.
- June 26, 2013: The United States Supreme Court published their decision in the case United States v. Windsor, allowing the federal government to recognize same-sex marriages.
- February 22, 2014: The Verkhovna Rada (Ukrainian parliament) voted to remove Ukrainian president Viktor Yanukovych after his violent attempt to put down protests in the capital, Kyiv.
- March 21, 2014: Russian Federation president Vladimir Putin declared the annexation of the Crimea region of Ukraine.
- March 28, 2014: Former Wisconsin Assembly majority leader Bill Kramer was indicted for sexual assault.
- June 13, 2014: The International military intervention against ISIL began.
- July 17, 2014: Malaysia Airlines Flight 17 crashed after it was shot down by Russian-led separatists in eastern Ukraine.
- September 22, 2014: United States and allied military forces began an airstrike campaign against ISIL targets in Syria.
- November 4, 2014: 2014 United States general election:
  - Scott Walker (R) re-elected Governor of Wisconsin.
  - Wisconsin voters ratified an amendment to the state constitution to require the existence of a department of transportation in the constitution (the department already existed) and require that certain transportation-related taxes and fees must be deposited in the transportation fund and cannot be used for other purposes.

== Major legislation ==
- July 1, 2013: An Act relating to: state finances and appropriations, constituting the executive budget act of the 2013 legislature, 2013 Act 20.

== Party summary ==
=== Senate summary ===
Senate partisan composition Democratic: 15 seats Republican: 18 seats

Affiliation	Party (Shading indicates majority caucus)		Total	
Affiliation	Democratic	Republican	Total	Vacant
End of previous Legislature	17	16	33	0
Start of Reg. Session	15	18	33	0
From Jun. 16, 2014 (Note: Republican Neal Kedzie (11th District) resigned.)	15	17	32	1
From Dec. 1, 2014 (Note: Republican Joe Leibham (9th District) resigned.)	15	16	31	2
Final voting share	48.39%	51.61%		
Beginning of the next Legislature	14	18	32	1

=== Assembly summary ===
Assembly Partisan composition Democratic: 39 seats Republican: 60 seats

Affiliation	Party (Shading indicates majority caucus)			Total	
Affiliation	Dem.	Ind.	Rep.	Total	Vacant
End of previous Legislature	39	1	57	97	2
Start of Reg. Session (Note: Republican Paul Farrow (98th district) resigned before the start of the session due to his election to the state senate.)	39	0	59	98	1
From Apr. 16, 2013 (Note: Republican Adam Neylon (98th district) was sworn in to succeed Paul Farrow.)	39	0	60	99	0
From Sep. 3, 2013 (Note: Republican Scott Suder (69th District) resigned.)	39	0	59	98	1
From Sep. 18, 2013 (Note: Republican Mark Honadel (21st District) resigned.)	39	0	58	97	2
From Oct. 14, 2013 (Note: Republican Jeff Stone (82nd District) resigned.)	39	0	57	96	3
From Dec. 4, 2013 (Note: Republicans Jessie Rodriguez (21st district) and Bob Kulp (69th district) were sworn in to succeed Mark Honadel and Scott Suder, respectively.)	39	0	59	98	1
From Jan. 6, 2014 (Note: Republican Ken Skowronski (82nd district) was sworn in to succeed Jeff Stone.)	39	0	60	99	0
Final voting share	39.39%		60.61%		
Beginning of the next Legislature	36	0	63	98	1

== Sessions ==
- Regular session: January 7, 2013 – January 5, 2015
- October 2013 special session: October 10, 2013 – November 12, 2013
- December 2013 special session: December 2, 2013 – December 19, 2013
- January 2014 special session: January 23, 2014 – March 20, 2014

== Leadership ==
=== Senate leadership ===
- President of the Senate: Michael G. Ellis (R–Neenah)
- President pro tempore: Joe Leibham (R–Sheboygan) (res. Dec. 1, 2014)

Senate majority leadership (Republican)

- Senate Majority Leader: Scott L. Fitzgerald (R–Juneau)
- Assistant Majority Leader: Glenn Grothman (R–West Bend)
- Majority Caucus Chair: Frank Lasee (R–De Pere)
- Majority Caucus vice-chair: Sheila Harsdorf (R–River Falls)

Senate minority leadership (Democratic)

- Senate Minority Leader: Chris Larson (D–Milwaukee)
- Assistant Minority Leader: Dave Hansen (D–Green Bay)
- Minority Caucus Chair: Julie Lassa (D–Stevens Point)
- Minority Caucus vice-chair: Kathleen Vinehout (D–Alma)

=== Assembly leadership ===
- Speaker of the Assembly: Robin Vos (R–Burlington)
- Speaker pro tempore: Tyler August (R–Lake Geneva)

Assembly majority leadership (Republican)

- Assembly Majority Leader: Scott Suder (R–Abbotsford) (until Sep. 3, 2013)
  - Bill Kramer (R–Waukesha) (from Sep. 4, 2013, removed Mar. 4, 2014)
  - Patricia Strachota (R–West Bend) (from Mar. 4, 2014)
- Assistant Majority Leader: Jim Steineke (R–Kaukauna)
- Assembly Majority Caucus Chair: Joan Ballweg (R–Markesan)
- Assembly Majority Caucus vice-chair: John Murtha (R–Baldwin)
- Assembly Majority Caucus Secretary: Mary Williams (R–Medford)
- Assembly Majority Caucus Sergeant-at-Arms: Samantha Kerkman (R–Randall)

Assembly minority leadership (Democratic)

- Assembly Minority Leader: Peter Barca (D–Kenosha)
- Assistant Minority Leader: Sandy Pasch (D–Whitefish Bay)
- Assembly Minority Caucus Chair: Andy Jorgensen (D–Fort Atkinson)
- Assembly Minority Caucus vice-chair: JoCasta Zamarripa (D–Milwaukee)
- Assembly Minority Caucus Secretary: Janis Ringhand (D–Evansville)
- Assembly Minority Caucus Sergeant-at-Arms: Josh Zepnick (D–Milwaukee)

== Members ==
=== Members of the Senate ===
Members of the Senate for the One Hundred First Wisconsin Legislature:

Senate partisan representation Democratic: 15 seats Republican: 18 seats

Dist.	Senator	Party	Age (2013)	Home	First elected
01	Frank Lasee	Rep.	51	De Pere, Brown County	2010
02	Robert Cowles	Rep.	62	Green Bay, Brown County	1987
03	Tim Carpenter	Dem.	52	Milwaukee, Milwaukee County	2002
04	Lena Taylor	Dem.	46	Milwaukee, Milwaukee County	2004
05	Leah Vukmir	Rep.	54	Wauwatosa, Milwaukee County	2010
06	Nikiya Harris	Dem.	37	Milwaukee, Milwaukee County	2012
07	Chris Larson	Dem.	32	Milwaukee, Milwaukee County	2010
08	Alberta Darling	Rep.	68	River Hills, Milwaukee County	1992
09	Joe Leibham (res. Dec. 1, 2014)	Rep.	43	Sheboygan, Sheboygan County	2002
09	--Vacant form Dec. 1, 2014--				
10	Sheila Harsdorf	Rep.	56	River Falls, Pierce County	2000
11	Neal Kedzie (res. Jun. 16, 2014)	Rep.	56	Elkhorn, Walworth County	2002
11	--Vacant from Jun. 16, 2014--				
12	Tom Tiffany	Rep.	55	Little Rice, Oneida County	2012
13	Scott L. Fitzgerald	Rep.	49	Juneau, Dodge County	1994
14	Luther Olsen	Rep.	61	Ripon, Fond du Lac County	2004
15	Timothy Cullen	Dem.	68	Janesville, Rock County	2010
16	Mark F. Miller	Dem.	69	Monona, Dane County	2004
17	Dale Schultz	Rep.	59	Richland Center, Richland County	1991
18	Rick Gudex	Rep.	44	Fond du Lac, Fond du Lac County	2012
19	Michael Ellis	Rep.	71	Neenah, Winnebago County	1982
20	Glenn Grothman	Rep.	57	West Bend, Washington County	2004
21	John Lehman	Dem.	67	Racine, Racine County	2006
22	Robert Wirch	Dem.	69	Somers, Kenosha County	1996
23	Terry Moulton	Rep.	66	Chippewa Falls, Chippewa County	2010
24	Julie Lassa	Dem.	42	Stevens Point, Portage County	2003
25	Robert Jauch	Dem.	67	Poplar, Douglas County	1986
26	Fred Risser	Dem.	85	Madison, Dane County	1962
27	Jon Erpenbach	Dem.	51	Middleton, Dane County	1998
28	Mary Lazich	Rep.	60	New Berlin, Waukesha County	1998
29	Jerry Petrowski	Rep.	62	Marathon, Marathon County	2012
30	Dave Hansen	Dem.	65	Green Bay, Brown County	2000
31	Kathleen Vinehout	Dem.	54	Alma, Buffalo County	2006
32	Jennifer Shilling	Dem.	43	La Crosse, La Crosse County	2011
33	Paul Farrow	Rep.	48	Pewaukee, Waukesha County	2012

=== Members of the Assembly ===
Members of the Assembly for the One Hundred First Wisconsin Legislature:

Assembly partisan representation Democratic: 39 seats Republican: 60 seats

Senate District	Assembly District	Representative	Party	Age (2013)	Home	First Elected
01	01	Garey Bies	Rep.	66	Sister Bay	2000
01	02	Andre Jacque	Rep.	32	De Pere	2010
01	03	Alvin Ott	Rep.	63	Brillion	1986
02	04	Chad Weininger	Rep.	40	Green Bay	2010
02	05	Jim Steineke	Rep.	42	Kaukauna	2010
02	06	Gary Tauchen	Rep.	59	Bonduel	2006
03	07	Daniel Riemer	Dem.	26	Milwaukee	2012
03	08	Jocasta Zamarripa	Dem.	36	Milwaukee	2010
03	09	Josh Zepnick	Dem.	44	Milwaukee	2002
04	10	Sandy Pasch	Dem.	58	Whitefish Bay	2008
04	11	Mandela Barnes	Dem.	26	Milwaukee	2012
04	12	Frederick P. Kessler	Dem.	72	Milwaukee	2004
05	13	Rob Hutton	Rep.	45	Brookfield	2012
05	14	Dale P. Kooyenga	Rep.	33	Brookfield	2010
05	15	Joe Sanfelippo	Rep.	51	West Allis	2012
06	16	Leon Young	Dem.	45	Milwaukee	1992
06	17	LaTonya Johnson	Dem.	40	Milwaukee	2012
06	18	Evan Goyke	Dem.	30	Milwaukee	2012
07	19	Jon Richards	Dem.	49	Milwaukee	1998
07	20	Christine Sinicki	Dem.	52	Bay View	1998
07	21	Mark Honadel (res. Sep. 18, 2013)	Rep.	56	South Milwaukee	2003
07	21	Jessie Rodriguez (from Dec. 4, 2013)	Rep.	36	Oak Creek	2013
08	22	Don Pridemore	Rep.	66	Hartford	2004
08	23	Jim Ott	Rep.	65	Mequon	2006
08	24	Dan Knodl	Rep.	54	Germantown	2008
09	25	Paul Tittl	Rep.	51	Manitowoc	2012
09	26	Mike Endsley	Rep.	50	Sheboygan	2010
09	27	Steve Kestell	Rep.	57	Elkhart Lake	1998
10	28	Erik Severson	Rep.	38	Star Prairie	2010
10	29	John Murtha	Rep.	61	Baldwin	2006
10	30	Dean Knudson	Rep.	51	Hudson	2010
11	31	Amy Loudenbeck	Rep.	43	Clinton	2010
11	32	Tyler August	Rep.	29	Lake Geneva	2010
11	33	Stephen Nass	Rep.	60	Whitewater	1990
12	34	Rob Swearingen	Rep.	49	Rhinelander	2012
12	35	Mary Czaja	Rep.	49	Birch	2012
12	36	Jeffrey Mursau	Rep.	58	Crivitz	2004
13	37	John Jagler	Rep.	43	Watertown	2012
13	38	Joel Kleefisch	Rep.	41	Oconomowoc	2004
13	39	Mark Born	Rep.	36	Beaver Dam	2012
14	40	Kevin David Petersen	Rep.	48	Waupaca	2006
14	41	Joan Ballweg	Rep.	60	Markesan	2004
14	42	Keith Ripp	Rep.	51	Lodi	2008
15	43	Andy Jorgensen	Dem.	45	Fort Atkinson	2006
15	44	Debra Kolste	Dem.	59	Janesville	2012
15	45	Janis Ringhand	Dem.	62	Evansville	2010
16	46	Gary Hebl	Dem.	61	Sun Prairie	2004
16	47	Robb Kahl	Dem.	40	Monona	2012
16	48	Melissa Sargent	Dem.	43	Madison	2012
17	49	Travis Tranel	Rep.	27	Cuba City	2010
17	50	Edward Brooks	Rep.	70	Reedsburg	2008
17	51	Howard Marklein	Rep.	58	Spring Green	2010
18	52	Jeremy Thiesfeldt	Rep.	46	Fond du Lac	2010
18	53	Michael Schraa	Rep.	51	Oshkosh	2008
18	54	Gordon Hintz	Dem.	39	Oshkosh	2006
19	55	Dean Kaufert	Rep.	55	Neenah	1990
19	56	Dave Murphy	Rep.	58	Greenville	2012
19	57	Penny Bernard Schaber	Dem.	59	Appleton	2008
20	58	Patricia Strachota	Rep.	57	West Bend	2004
20	59	Daniel LeMahieu	Rep.	66	Cascade	2002
20	60	Duey Stroebel	Rep.	53	Cedarburg	2011
21	61	Samantha Kerkman	Rep.	38	Randall	2000
21	62	Tom Weatherston	Rep.	62	Caledonia	2012
21	63	Robin Vos	Rep.	44	Burlington	2004
22	64	Peter Barca	Dem.	57	Kenosha	1984
22	65	Tod Ohnstad	Dem.	60	Kenosha	2012
22	66	Cory Mason	Dem.	39	Racine	2006
23	67	Tom Larson	Rep.	64	Colfax	2010
23	68	Kathy Bernier	Rep.	56	Chippewa Falls	2010
23	69	Scott Suder (res. Sep. 3, 2013)	Rep.	44	Abbotsford	1998
23	69	Bob Kulp (from Dec. 4, 2013)	Rep.	47	Stratford	2013
24	70	Amy Sue Vruwink	Dem.	37	Milladore	2002
24	71	Katrina Shankland	Dem.	25	Stevens Point	2012
24	72	Scott Krug	Rep.	37	Rome	2010
25	73	Nick Milroy	Dem.	38	Parkland	2008
25	74	Janet Bewley	Dem.	61	Ashland	2010
25	75	Stephen Smith	Dem.	61	Shell Lake	2012
26	76	Chris Taylor	Dem.	44	Madison	2011
26	77	Terese Berceau	Dem.	62	Madison	1998
26	78	Brett Hulsey	Dem.	53	Madison	2010
27	79	Dianne Hesselbein	Dem.	41	Middleton	2012
27	80	Sondy Pope	Dem.	62	Cross Plains	2002
27	81	Fred Clark	Dem.	53	Baraboo	2008
28	82	Jeff Stone (res. Oct. 14, 2013)	Rep.	51	Greendale	1998
28	82	Ken Skowronski (from Jan. 6, 2014)	Rep.	75	Franklin	2013
28	83	David Craig	Rep.	33	Vernon	2011
28	84	Mike Kuglitsch	Rep.	52	New Berlin	2010
29	85	Mandy Wright	Dem.	35	Wausau	2012
29	86	John Spiros	Rep.	51	Marshfield	2012
29	87	Mary Williams	Rep.	63	Medford	2002
30	88	John Klenke	Rep.	54	Green Bay	2010
30	89	John Nygren	Rep.	48	Marinette	2006
30	90	Eric Genrich	Dem.	33	Green Bay	2012
31	91	Dana Wachs	Dem.	55	Eau Claire	2008
31	92	Chris Danou	Dem.	45	Trempealeau	2008
31	93	Warren Petryk	Rep.	57	Eleva	2010
32	94	Steve Doyle	Dem.	54	Onalaska	2011
32	95	Jill Billings	Dem.	50	La Crosse	2011
32	96	Lee Nerison	Rep.	60	Westby	2004
33	97	Bill Kramer	Rep.	47	Waukesha	2006
33	98	--Vacant until Apr. 16, 2013--				
33	98	Adam Neylon (from Apr. 16, 2013)	Rep.	28	Pewaukee	2013
33	99	Chris Kapenga	Rep.	40	Delafield	2010

== Employees ==
=== Senate employees ===
- Chief Clerk: Jeffrey Renk
- Sergeant-at-Arms: Edward A. Blazel

=== Assembly employees ===
- Chief Clerk: Patrick E. Fuller
- Sergeant-at-Arms: Anne Tonnon Byers
