= 2018 Wisconsin State Assembly election =

- November 6, 2018

All 99 seats in the Wisconsin State Assembly 50 seats needed for a majority
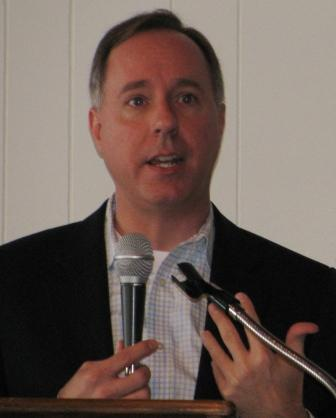

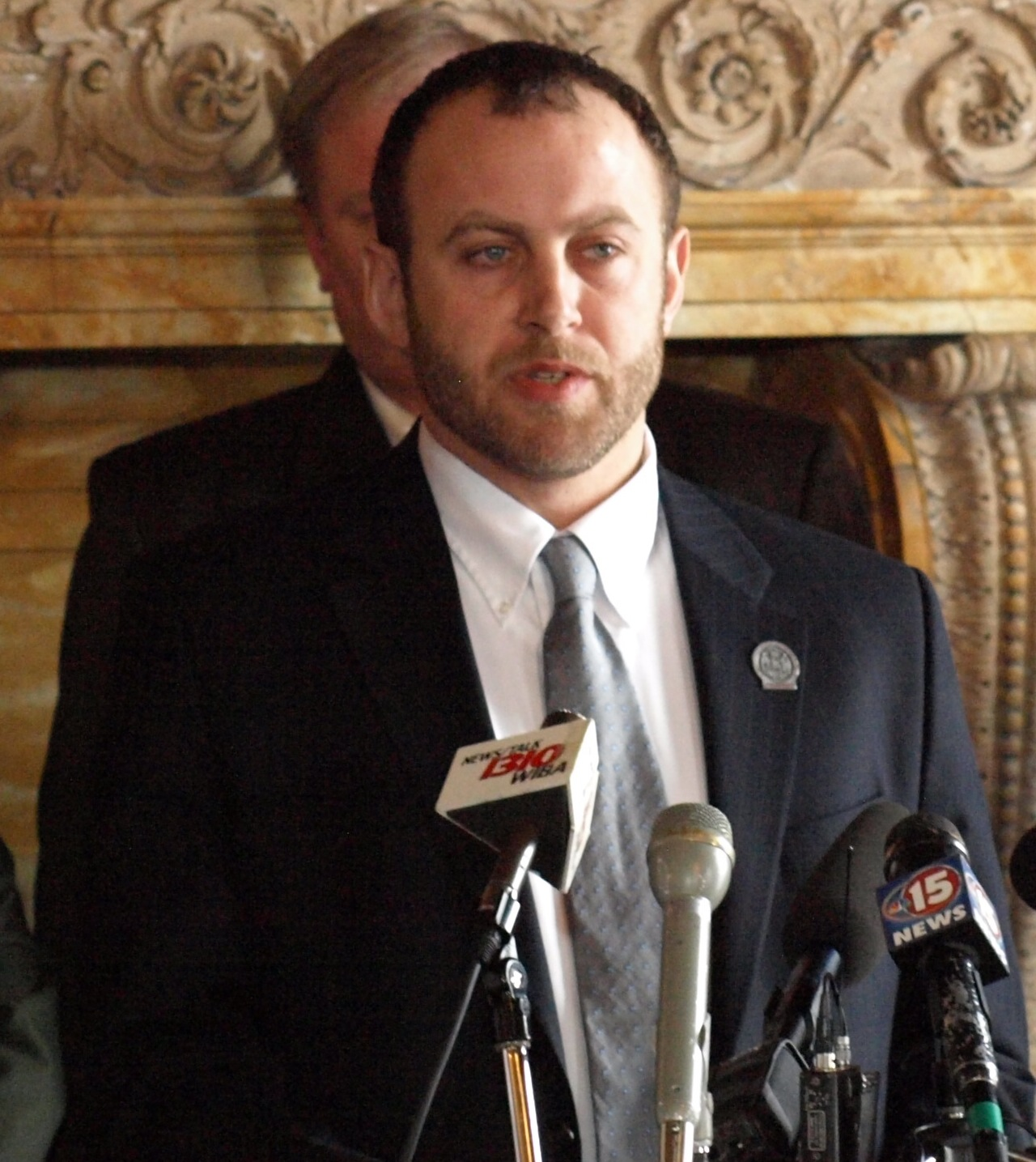
	Majority party	Minority party
Leader	Robin Vos	Gordon Hintz
Party	Republican	Democratic
Leader since	January 7, 2013	October 1, 2017
Leader's seat	63rd–Rochester	54th–Oshkosh
Last election	64 seats, 51.69%	35 seats, 45.45%
Seats won	63	36
Seat change	▼1	▲1
Popular vote	1,103,505	1,306,878
Percentage	44.75%	52.99%
Swing	▼6.94 pp	▲7.54 pp
- Republican hold Democratic gain Democratic hold 50–60% 60–70% 70–80% >90% 40–50% 50–60% 60–70% 70–80% 80–90% >90%
Speaker before election
Robin Vos
Republican
Speaker-designate
Robin Vos
Republican

The Wisconsin State Assembly elections of 2018 were held on Tuesday, November 6, 2018. All 99 seats in the Wisconsin State Assembly were up for election. The Republican Party maintained a majority it had held since 2011, winning 63 seats, losing one seat, and receiving 44.75% of the voting share. Despite winning a majority of ballots cast, the Democratic Party won only 36 seats, thus remaining a minority and gaining just one seat from the Republicans, District 14.

Democratic votes were concentrated in urban areas such as Milwaukee and Madison, while Republicans garnered votes in more rural areas, which was widely attributed to the impact of gerrymandering in the post-2010 state redistricting. Based on the 2018 results, the tipping point district was District 29, which the Republicans won by a margin of 12.12%. Democrats would have needed to win the statewide popular vote by a margin of 20.36% to win a majority of seats.

== Predictions ==
Source	Ranking	As of
Governing	Likely R	October 8, 2018

== Results ==
Party	Candidates	Votes			Seats	
Party	Candidates	No.	%	+/−	No.	+/−
Republican Party	69	1,103,505	44.75	−6.94	63	−1
Democratic Party	91	1,306,878	52.99	+7.54	36	+1
Libertarian Party	7	19,480	0.79	+0.32	0	0
Constitution Party	1	4,441	0.18	+0.18	0	0
Independent	5	13,019	0.53	−1.13	0	0
Write-in	N/A	18,830	0.76	+0.09	0	0
Total		2,466,153	100.00	±0.00	99	±0
Source: Wisconsin Elections Commission

Popular vote
Democratic	52.99%
Republican	44.75%
Other	2.26%

Assembly seats
Republican	63.64%
Democratic	36.36%

=== Results by district ===
District	Incumbent			Candidates			
District	Name	Party	First elected	Name	Party	Votes	%
1	Joel Kitchens	Republican	2014	Joel Kitchens	Republican	20,651	68.38
1	Joel Kitchens	Republican	2014	Roberta Thelen	Independent	9,519	31.52
2	Andre Jacque	Republican	2010	Shae Sortwell	Republican	15,014	54.82
2	Andre Jacque	Republican	2010	Mark Grams	Democratic	10,118	36.94
2	Andre Jacque	Republican	2010	Jeff Dahlke	Independent	1,494	5.45
2	Andre Jacque	Republican	2010	Kevin Bauer	Libertarian	745	2.72
3	Ron Tusler	Republican	2016	Ron Tusler	Republican	15,847	57.37
3	Ron Tusler	Republican	2016	Scott Gavin	Democratic	11,775	42.63
4	David Steffen	Republican	2014	David Steffen	Republican	15,291	54.81
4	David Steffen	Republican	2014	Terry Lee	Democratic	12,585	45.11
5	Jim Steineke	Republican	2010	Jim Steineke	Republican	17,175	61.06
5	Jim Steineke	Republican	2010	Matt Lederer	Democratic	10,952	38.94
6	Gary Tauchen	Republican	2006	Gary Tauchen	Republican	15,028	61.60
6	Gary Tauchen	Republican	2006	Richard Sarnwick	Democratic	7,693	31.53
6	Gary Tauchen	Republican	2006	Mike Hammond	Libertarian	1,675	6.87
7	Daniel Riemer	Democratic	2012	Daniel Riemer	Democratic	15,187	78.28
7	Daniel Riemer	Democratic	2012	Matthew Bughman	Libertarian	3,953	20.38
8	JoCasta Zamarripa	Democratic	2010	JoCasta Zamarripa	Democratic	7,384	81.70
8	JoCasta Zamarripa	Democratic	2010	Angel Sanchez	Republican	1,639	18.13
9	Josh Zepnick	Democratic	2002	Marisabel Cabrera	Democratic	11,453	97.96
10	David Bowen	Democratic	2014	David Bowen	Democratic	20,961	99.11
11	Jason Fields	Democratic	2016	Jason Fields	Democratic	17,162	98.75
12	Fred Kessler	Democratic	2004	LaKeshia Myers	Democratic	17,428	98.45
13	Rob Hutton	Republican	2012	Rob Hutton	Republican	16,617	51.41
13	Rob Hutton	Republican	2012	Dennis McBride	Democratic	15,662	48.45
14	Dale Kooyenga	Republican	2010	Robyn Vining	Democratic	16,597	48.58
14	Dale Kooyenga	Republican	2010	Matt Adamczyk	Republican	16,459	48.18
14	Dale Kooyenga	Republican	2010	Rick Braun	Libertarian	691	2.02
14	Dale Kooyenga	Republican	2010	Steven Shevey	Independent	402	1.18
15	Joe Sanfelippo	Republican	2012	Joe Sanfelippo	Republican	15,089	56.11
15	Joe Sanfelippo	Republican	2012	Lillian Cheesman	Democratic	11,768	43.76
16	Leon Young	Democratic	1993	Kalan Haywood	Democratic	16,861	98.80
17	David Crowley	Democratic	2016	David Crowley	Democratic	20,820	99.04
18	Evan Goyke	Democratic	2012	Evan Goyke	Democratic	17,426	98.99
19	Jonathan Brostoff	Democratic	2014	Jonathan Brostoff	Democratic	27,543	97.50
20	Christine Sinicki	Democratic	1998	Christine Sinicki	Democratic	20,245	96.09
21	Jessie Rodriguez	Republican	2013	Jessie Rodriguez	Republican	14,280	54.66
21	Jessie Rodriguez	Republican	2013	Gabriel Gomez	Democratic	11,806	45.19
22	Janel Brandtjen	Republican	2014	Janel Brandtjen	Republican	21,153	64.25
22	Janel Brandtjen	Republican	2014	Aaron Matteson	Democratic	11,738	35.65
23	Jim Ott	Republican	2006	Jim Ott	Republican	18,321	51.93
23	Jim Ott	Republican	2006	Liz Sumner	Democratic	16,939	48.01
24	Dan Knodl	Republican	2008	Dan Knodl	Republican	17,650	53.64
24	Dan Knodl	Republican	2008	Emily Siegrist	Democratic	15,244	46.33
25	Paul Tittl	Republican	2012	Paul Tittl	Republican	14,785	62.02
25	Paul Tittl	Republican	2012	Jennifer Estrada	Democratic	9,042	37.93
26	Terry Katsma	Republican	2014	Terry Katsma	Republican	14,485	58.02
26	Terry Katsma	Republican	2014	Rebecca Clarke	Democratic	10,466	41.92
27	Tyler Vorpagel	Republican	2014	Tyler Vorpagel	Republican	16,533	59.61
27	Tyler Vorpagel	Republican	2014	Nanette Bulebosh	Democratic	11,186	40.33
28	Adam Jarchow	Republican	2014	Gae Magnafici	Republican	14,441	59.01
28	Adam Jarchow	Republican	2014	Kim Butler	Democratic	10,028	40.98
29	Rob Stafsholt	Republican	2016	Rob Stafsholt	Republican	12,523	54.70
29	Rob Stafsholt	Republican	2016	John Rocco Calabrese	Democratic	9,750	42.58
29	Rob Stafsholt	Republican	2016	Brian Corriea	Libertarian	620	2.71
30	Shannon Zimmerman	Republican	2016	Shannon Zimmerman	Republican	15,240	53.91
30	Shannon Zimmerman	Republican	2016	Barry Hammarback	Democratic	13,015	46.04
31	Amy Loudenbeck	Republican	2010	Amy Loudenbeck	Republican	15,299	57.47
31	Amy Loudenbeck	Republican	2010	Brittany Keyes	Democratic	11,305	42.46
32	Tyler August	Republican	2010	Tyler August	Republican	14,813	59.22
32	Tyler August	Republican	2010	Katherine Gaulke	Democratic	10,182	40.70
33	Cody Horlacher	Republican	2014	Cody Horlacher	Republican	17,236	62.73
33	Cody Horlacher	Republican	2014	Brandon White	Democratic	10,219	37.19
34	Rob Swearingen	Republican	2012	Rob Swearingen	Republican	19,699	61.92
34	Rob Swearingen	Republican	2012	Chris Meier	Democratic	12,096	38.02
35	Mary Felzkowski	Republican	2012	Mary Felzkowski	Republican	16,380	62.74
35	Mary Felzkowski	Republican	2012	Mark Martello	Democratic	9,714	37.21
36	Jeffrey Mursau	Republican	2004	Jeffrey Mursau	Republican	16,938	66.99
36	Jeffrey Mursau	Republican	2004	Tim Comer	Democratic	8,338	32.98
37	John Jagler	Republican	2012	John Jagler	Republican	19,616	96.00
38	Joel Kleefisch	Republican	2004	Barbara Dittrich	Republican	18,056	57.57
38	Joel Kleefisch	Republican	2004	Melissa Winker	Democratic	13,286	42.36
39	Mark Born	Republican	2012	Mark Born	Republican	15,940	63.38
39	Mark Born	Republican	2012	Elisha Barudin	Democratic	9,210	36.62
40	Kevin Petersen	Republican	2006	Kevin Petersen	Republican	15,794	64.32
40	Kevin Petersen	Republican	2006	Erin Tracy	Democratic	8,759	35.67
41	Joan Ballweg	Republican	2004	Joan Ballweg	Republican	15,257	62.92
41	Joan Ballweg	Republican	2004	Frank Buress	Democratic	8,984	37.05
42	Jon Plumer	Republican	2018	Jon Plumer	Republican	15,299	57.67
42	Jon Plumer	Republican	2018	Ann Groves Lloyd	Democratic	11,209	42.25
43	Don Vruwink	Democratic	2016	Don Vruwink	Democratic	16,241	61.14
43	Don Vruwink	Democratic	2016	Gabriel Szerlong	Republican	10,288	38.73
44	Deb Kolste	Democratic	2012	Deb Kolste	Democratic	18,005	97.47
45	Mark Spreitzer	Democratic	2014	Mark Spreitzer	Democratic	14,198	79.10
45	Mark Spreitzer	Democratic	2014	Reese Wood	Libertarian	3,496	19.48
46	Gary Hebl	Democratic	2004	Gary Hebl	Democratic	24,011	97.22
47	Jimmy Anderson	Democratic	2016	Jimmy Anderson	Democratic	25,706	98.02
48	Melissa Sargent	Democratic	2012	Melissa Sargent	Democratic	27,794	98.22
49	Travis Tranel	Republican	2010	Travis Tranel	Republican	12,858	58.86
49	Travis Tranel	Republican	2010	Mike Mooney	Democratic	8,968	41.05
50	Ed Brooks	Republican	2008	Tony Kurtz	Republican	12,379	54.53
50	Ed Brooks	Republican	2008	Arthur Shrader	Democratic	9,658	42.55
50	Ed Brooks	Republican	2008	James Krus	Independent	659	2.90
51	Todd Novak	Republican	2014	Todd Novak	Republican	12,445	50.65
51	Todd Novak	Republican	2014	Jeff Wright	Democratic	12,113	49.29
52	Jeremy Thiesfeldt	Republican	2010	Jeremy Thiesfeldt	Republican	15,164	61.63
52	Jeremy Thiesfeldt	Republican	2010	Kevin Booth	Democratic	9,427	38.31
53	Michael Schraa	Republican	2012	Michael Schraa	Republican	15,160	63.20
53	Michael Schraa	Republican	2012	Joe Lavrenz	Democratic	8,812	36.74
54	Gordon Hintz	Democratic	2006	Gordon Hintz	Democratic	18,019	94.04
55	Mike Rohrkaste	Republican	2014	Mike Rohrkaste	Republican	15,122	55.15
55	Mike Rohrkaste	Republican	2014	Dan Schierl	Democratic	12,283	44.80
56	Dave Murphy	Republican	2012	Dave Murphy	Republican	18,033	59.82
56	Dave Murphy	Republican	2012	Diana Lawrence	Democratic	12,110	40.17
57	Amanda Stuck	Democratic	2014	Amanda Stuck	Democratic	16,946	98.20
58	Rick Gundrum	Republican	2018	Rick Gundrum	Republican	20,471	70.98
58	Rick Gundrum	Republican	2018	Dennis Degenhardt	Democratic	8,368	29.02
59	Jesse Kremer	Republican	2014	Timothy Ramthun	Republican	23,339	99.30
60	Robert Brooks	Republican	2011	Robert Brooks	Republican	20,702	64.86
60	Robert Brooks	Republican	2011	Chris Rahlf	Democratic	11,182	35.03
61	Samantha Kerkman	Republican	2000	Samantha Kerkman	Republican	16,606	61.87
61	Samantha Kerkman	Republican	2000	Gina Walkington	Democratic	10,207	38.03
62	Tom Weatherston	Republican	2012	Robert Wittke	Republican	16,035	54.87
62	Tom Weatherston	Republican	2012	John Lehman	Democratic	13,161	45.04
63	Robin Vos	Republican	2004	Robin Vos	Republican	16,775	61.00
63	Robin Vos	Republican	2004	Joel Jacobsen	Democratic	10,705	38.93
64	Peter Barca	Democratic	2008	Peter Barca	Democratic	16,773	78.32
64	Peter Barca	Democratic	2008	Thomas Harland	Constitution	4,441	20.74
65	Tod Ohnstad	Democratic	2012	Tod Ohnstad	Democratic	14,456	96.82
66	Greta Neubauer	Democratic	2018	Greta Neubauer	Democratic	14,450	97.01
67	Rob Summerfield	Republican	2016	Rob Summerfield	Republican	15,970	61.78
67	Rob Summerfield	Republican	2016	Wren Keturi	Democratic	9,878	38.22
68	Kathy Bernier	Republican	2010	Jesse James	Republican	14,129	57.59
68	Kathy Bernier	Republican	2010	Wendy Sue Johnson	Democratic	10,394	42.37
69	Bob Kulp	Republican	2013	Bob Kulp	Republican	17,257	91.28
69	Bob Kulp	Republican	2013	Kathleen Rulka	Write-in	1,576	8.34
70	Nancy VanderMeer	Republican	2014	Nancy VanderMeer	Republican	15,027	61.91
70	Nancy VanderMeer	Republican	2014	Cari Fay	Democratic	9,223	38.00
71	Katrina Shankland	Democratic	2012	Katrina Shankland	Democratic	20,548	97.75
72	Scott Krug	Republican	2010	Scott Krug	Republican	14,773	57.32
72	Scott Krug	Republican	2010	David Gorski	Democratic	10,992	42.65
73	Nick Milroy	Democratic	2008	Nick Milroy	Democratic	18,510	96.94
74	Beth Meyers	Democratic	2014	Beth Meyers	Democratic	15,738	56.16
74	Beth Meyers	Democratic	2014	Jeffrey Fahl	Republican	12,276	43.81
75	Romaine Quinn	Republican	2014	Romaine Quinn	Republican	14,925	62.18
75	Romaine Quinn	Republican	2014	Ali Holzman	Democratic	9,078	37.82
76	Chris Taylor	Democratic	2011	Chris Taylor	Democratic	36,891	98.43
77	Terese Berceau	Democratic	1998	Shelia Stubbs	Democratic	29,347	98.68
78	Lisa Subeck	Democratic	2014	Lisa Subeck	Democratic	30,044	98.06
79	Dianne Hesselbein	Democratic	2012	Dianne Hesselbein	Democratic	28,079	97.58
80	Sondy Pope	Democratic	2002	Sondy Pope	Democratic	26,189	97.69
81	Dave Considine	Democratic	2014	Dave Considine	Democratic	19,766	98.64
82	Ken Skowronski	Republican	2013	Ken Skowronski	Republican	18,039	67.97
82	Ken Skowronski	Republican	2013	Jason Sellnow	Libertarian	8,300	31.28
83	Chuck Wichgers	Republican	2016	Chuck Wichgers	Republican	22,351	69.85
83	Chuck Wichgers	Republican	2016	Jim Brownlow	Democratic	9,624	30.08
84	Mike Kuglitsch	Republican	2010	Mike Kuglitsch	Republican	16,684	57.44
84	Mike Kuglitsch	Republican	2010	Erica Flynn	Democratic	12,341	42.49
85	Patrick Snyder	Republican	2016	Patrick Snyder	Republican	13,791	55.25
85	Patrick Snyder	Republican	2016	Alyson Leahy	Democratic	11,150	44.67
86	John Spiros	Republican	2012	John Spiros	Republican	17,174	59.80
86	John Spiros	Republican	2012	Nancy Stencil	Democratic	10,575	36.82
86	John Spiros	Republican	2012	Michael Tauschek	Independent	945	3.29
87	James Edming	Republican	2014	James Edming	Republican	15,682	66.12
87	James Edming	Republican	2014	Elizabeth Riley	Democratic	8,027	33.84
88	John Macco	Republican	2014	John Macco	Republican	14,628	53.31
88	John Macco	Republican	2014	Tom Sieber	Democratic	12,793	46.62
89	John Nygren	Republican	2006	John Nygren	Republican	17,091	66.85
89	John Nygren	Republican	2006	Ken Holdorf	Democratic	8,461	33.10
90	Eric Genrich	Democratic	2012	Staush Gruszynski	Democratic	12,994	96.34
91	Dana Wachs	Democratic	2012	Jodi Emerson	Democratic	17,512	66.47
91	Dana Wachs	Democratic	2012	Echo Reardon	Republican	8,798	33.39
92	Treig Pronschinske	Republican	2016	Treig Pronschinske	Republican	12,955	55.13
92	Treig Pronschinske	Republican	2016	Rob Grover	Democratic	10,537	44.84
93	Warren Petryk	Republican	2010	Warren Petryk	Republican	15,935	58.20
93	Warren Petryk	Republican	2010	Charlene Warner	Democratic	11,435	41.76
94	Steve Doyle	Democratic	2011	Steve Doyle	Democratic	17,498	60.20
94	Steve Doyle	Democratic	2011	Albert Rohland	Republican	11,567	39.80
95	Jill Billings	Democratic	2011	Jill Billings	Democratic	21,989	100.00
96	Lee Nerison	Republican	2004	Loren Oldenburg	Republican	12,327	51.65
96	Lee Nerison	Republican	2004	Paul Buhr	Democratic	11,536	48.34
97	Scott Allen	Republican	2014	Scott Allen	Republican	18,945	96.03
98	Adam Neylon	Republican	2013	Adam Neylon	Republican	23,005	97.11
99	Cindi Duchow	Republican	2015	Cindi Duchow	Republican	26,251	97.94

== See also ==
- 2018 Wisconsin gubernatorial election
- 2018 Wisconsin State Senate election
- 2018 Wisconsin elections
