= John Jagler =

American politician

Member of the Wisconsin Senate from the 13th district
- Incumbent
- Assumed office April 23, 2021
- Preceded by: Scott L. Fitzgerald

Member of the Wisconsin State Assembly from the 37th district
- In office January 7, 2013 – April 23, 2021
- Preceded by: Andy Jorgensen
- Succeeded by: William Penterman

Personal details
- Born: November 4, 1969 (age 56) Louisville, Kentucky, U.S.
- Party: Republican
- Spouse: Heidi
- Children: 3
- Education: Trans-American School of Broadcasting; University of Wisconsin–Parkside
- Profession: communications consultant
- Website: legis.wisconsin.gov

John Jagler (born November 4, 1969) is an American radio broadcaster, communications consultant, and Republican politician from Watertown, Wisconsin. He is a member of the Wisconsin Senate, representing the 13th Senate district since 2021. He previously served four terms in the Wisconsin State Assembly, from 2013 to 2021.

== Early life and career ==
Born in Louisville, Kentucky, Jagler moved to Oak Creek, Wisconsin, with his family at age 3 and graduated from Oak Creek High School in 1987. After graduating high school, he attended the University of Wisconsin–Parkside, but departed instead to the Trans-American School of Broadcasting in Madison, Wisconsin, where he earned an associate's degree in 1989.

Jagler worked in radio broadcasting for over 20 years, most of it spent at WTMJ radio in Milwaukee. For several years he was the co-host of Wisconsin's Morning News with Gene Mueller. He also started a communications and media consulting firm, Jagler Communications, which he still owns and operates.

== Political career ==
In January 2010, he joined the legislative staff of state representative Jeff Fitzgerald as communications director. Following the 2010 election, Fitzgerald became Speaker of the Wisconsin State Assembly. Jagler remained on his staff until announcing his own campaign for Wisconsin State Assembly in 2012.

The 37th Assembly district was significantly redrawn in the controversial Republican redistricting act of 2011 (2011 Wisc. Act 43). The previous representative of the 37th district, Democrat Andy Jorgensen, was drawn out of the district entirely, residing in what was—after 2011—the 43rd district, and leaving the 37th district an open seat. The new 37th district was heavily gerrymandered to create a Republican-majority district, and it resulted in a flood of Republican candidates entering the primary for the open seat. Jagler was endorsed by Speaker Fitzgerald and the entire Assembly Republican leadership. He also received substantial support from other Republican officeholders, including, significantly, State Representative Joel Kleefisch, whose 38th Assembly district previously covered much of the territory of the new 37th district. Kleefisch was also, notably, the husband of the new Lieutenant Governor of Wisconsin, Rebecca Kleefisch, with the Kleefisches also being former broadcast reporters. In the August primary, Jagler cruised to victory over his four opponents. He went on to win the 2012 general election with 55% of the vote over Democrat Mary Arnold. Jagler served for five terms.

Shortly after the 2020 election, where State Senator Scott L. Fitzgerald, brother of former Speaker Jeff Fitzgerald, was elected to the United States House of Representatives, Jagler announced his candidacy for Fitzgerald's state senate seat. Jagler once again faced a crowded primary field and received substantial support from the party; he was immediately endorsed by Scott Fitzgerald. Jagler prevailed in the February primary with 57% of the vote, and went on to defeat Democrat Melissa Winker in the April special election.

== Personal life and family ==
Jagler and his wife, Heidi, have lived in Watertown, Wisconsin, for over 20 years. They have three children.

== Electoral history ==
=== Wisconsin Assembly (2012–2020) ===
Year	Election	Date	Elected				Defeated				Total	Plurality
2012	Primary	Aug. 14	John Jagler	Republican	3,412	52.14%	Steve Kauffeld	Rep.	1,227	18.75%	6,544	2,185
2012	Primary	Aug. 14	John Jagler	Republican	3,412	52.14%	James B. Braughler	Rep.	764	11.67%	6,544	2,185
2012	Primary	Aug. 14	John Jagler	Republican	3,412	52.14%	James W. Romlein Sr.	Rep.	655	10.01%	6,544	2,185
2012	Primary	Aug. 14	John Jagler	Republican	3,412	52.14%	Chris Ruetten	Rep.	475	7.26%	6,544	2,185
2012	General	Nov. 6	John Jagler	Republican	15,799	54.16%	Mary I. Arnold	Dem.	13,289	45.55%	29,172	2,510
2014	General	Nov. 4	John Jagler (inc.)	Republican	14,400	58.84%	Mary I. Arnold	Dem.	10,058	41.10%	24,473	4,342
2016	General	Nov. 8	John Jagler (inc.)	Republican	17,821	61.78%	Jordan Turner	Dem.	10,990	38.10%	28,848	6,831
2018	General	Nov. 6	John Jagler (inc.)	Republican	19,616	96.00%	--unopposed--				20,433	18,799
2020	General	Nov. 8	John Jagler (inc.)	Republican	19,406	56.08%	Abigail Lowery	Dem.	14,142	40.87%	34,602	5,264
2020	General	Nov. 8	John Jagler (inc.)	Republican	19,406	56.08%	Stephen W. Ratzlaff Jr.	Ind.	1,041	3.01%	34,602	5,264

=== Wisconsin Senate (2021–present) ===
Year	Election	Date	Elected				Defeated				Total	Plurality
2021 (special)	Primary	Feb. 16	John Jagler	Republican	6,034	57.01%	Don Pridemore	Rep.	3,343	31.59%	10,584	2,691
2021 (special)	Primary	Feb. 16	John Jagler	Republican	6,034	57.01%	Todd Menzel	Rep.	1,204	11.38%	10,584	2,691
2021 (special)	Special	Apr. 6	John Jagler	Republican	19,125	50.99%	Melissa Winkler	Dem.	16,364	43.62%	37,511	2,761
2021 (special)	Special	Apr. 6	John Jagler	Republican	19,125	50.99%	Spencer Zimmerman	Ind.	1,702	4.54%	37,511	2,761
2021 (special)	Special	Apr. 6	John Jagler	Republican	19,125	50.99%	Ben Schmitz	Ind.	194	0.52%	37,511	2,761
2021 (special)	Special	Apr. 6	John Jagler	Republican	19,125	50.99%	Don Pridemore (write-in)	Ind.	85	0.23%	37,511	2,761
2022	General	Nov. 8	John Jagler (inc.)	Republican	61,817	96.69%	--unopposed--				63,935	59,699

Wisconsin State Assembly
Preceded by Andy Jorgensen	Member of the Wisconsin State Assembly from the 37th district January 7, 2013 – April 23, 2021	William Penterman
Wisconsin Senate
Preceded by Scott L. Fitzgerald	Member of the Wisconsin Senate from the 13th district April 23, 2021 – present	Incumbent
