= Maureen McCarville =

21st century American politician

Member of the Wisconsin State Assembly from the 42nd district
- Incumbent
- Assumed office January 6, 2025
- Preceded by: Jon Plumer

Member of the Board of Supervisors of Dane County, Wisconsin, from the 22nd district
- Incumbent
- Assumed office April 2012
- Preceded by: Dennis O'Loughlin

Personal details
- Born: Maureen Ann McCarville; May 21, 1958 (age 68) Rockford, Illinois, U.S.
- Party: Democratic
- Spouses: Robert Madison Hill (div. 1986); Rodney A. Hoverson (div. 1998)
- Education: Upper Iowa University (B.S.)
- Website: Official website Campaign website

Military service
- Allegiance: United States
- Branch/service: Wisconsin National Guard

Maureen Ann McCarville (born May 21, 1958) is an American Democratic politician from Dane County, Wisconsin. She is a member of the Wisconsin State Assembly, and represents Wisconsin's 42nd Assembly district in the 2025–2026 term. She also currently serves as a member of the Dane County Board of Supervisors, since 2012, and previously served on the village board of DeForest, Wisconsin.

She was also previously known as Maureen Ann Hill and Maureen Ann Hoverson.

== Early life and career ==
Maureen McCarville was born on May 21, 1958 in Rockford, Illinois. She and her family later moved to Beloit, Wisconsin, where she graduated from Beloit Memorial High School and went on to earn her bachelor's degree from Upper Iowa University. and has resided in the DeForest, Wisconsin, area since 1979. She has been employed in the accounting department of Madison Gas and Electric since at least 2012.

== Political career ==
McCarville won her first political office in 1999 when she was elected to the DeForest village board. She served four years in that office, and then served by appointment on the DeForest Police and Fire Commission from 2001 to 2012. In 2012, she was elected to the Dane County Board of Supervisors, representing DeForest and neighboring Windsor. She was re-elected to six terms, retiring in 2026.

She first sought election to the Wisconsin State Assembly in 2022, challenging first-term incumbent William Penterman in what was then the 37th Assembly district. The district at that time stretched from DeForest in the west all the way across the southern quarter of Dodge County, and was considered a safe Republican district. McCarville lost the election, receiving 44% of the vote.

In 2023, the Wisconsin Supreme Court struck down the decade-old Republican legislative gerrymander. The legislature adopted a remedial redistricting plan in 2024, which dramatically redrew legislative districts. McCarville's region was significantly affected, and DeForest moved from the 37th district to the 42nd district. The new 42nd district comprised DeForest and Windsor along with the southern half of neighboring Columbia County. Although two incumbent Republicans resided in the new 42nd district, neither chose to run for that seat in 2024; Penterman chose to relocate to run in the 38th district, Jon Plumer chose to retire. In early 2024, McCarville announced she would run for the open seat. She faced no opponent in the Democratic primary; in the general election her opponent was Rebecca Witherspoon, a member of the DeForest village board. During her campaign, McCarville advocated for expanding abortion rights and building affordable housing and mass transit. McCarville prevailed with 55% of the vote.

McCarville took office in January 2025.

== Personal life and family ==
Maureen McCarville is one of six children born to Michael P. and Marilyn (née McKittrick) McCarville.

Maureen McCarville was married twice. Her first husband was Robert Madison Hill, they divorced in 1986. She subsequently married Rodney A. Hoverson, and divorced him in 1998. After her second divorce, she reverted to using her maiden name.

== Electoral history ==
=== Wisconsin Assembly, 37th district (2022) ===
| Year | Election | Date | Elected | | | | Defeated | | | | Total | Plurality |
|---|---|---|---|---|---|---|---|---|---|---|---|---|
| 2022 | General | Nov. 8 | William Penterman (inc) | Republican | 15,343 | 55.77% | Maureen McCarville | Dem. | 12,154 | 44.18% | 27,509 | 3,189 |

=== Wisconsin Assembly, 42nd district (2024) ===
| Year | Election | Date | Elected | | | | Defeated | | | | Total | Plurality |
|---|---|---|---|---|---|---|---|---|---|---|---|---|
| 2024 | General | Nov. 5 | Maureen McCarville | Democratic | 20,400 | 55.01% | Rebecca Witherspoon | Rep. | 16,648 | 44.89% | 37,086 | 3,752 |
