= Rebecca Kleefisch =

44th Lieutenant Governor of Wisconsin

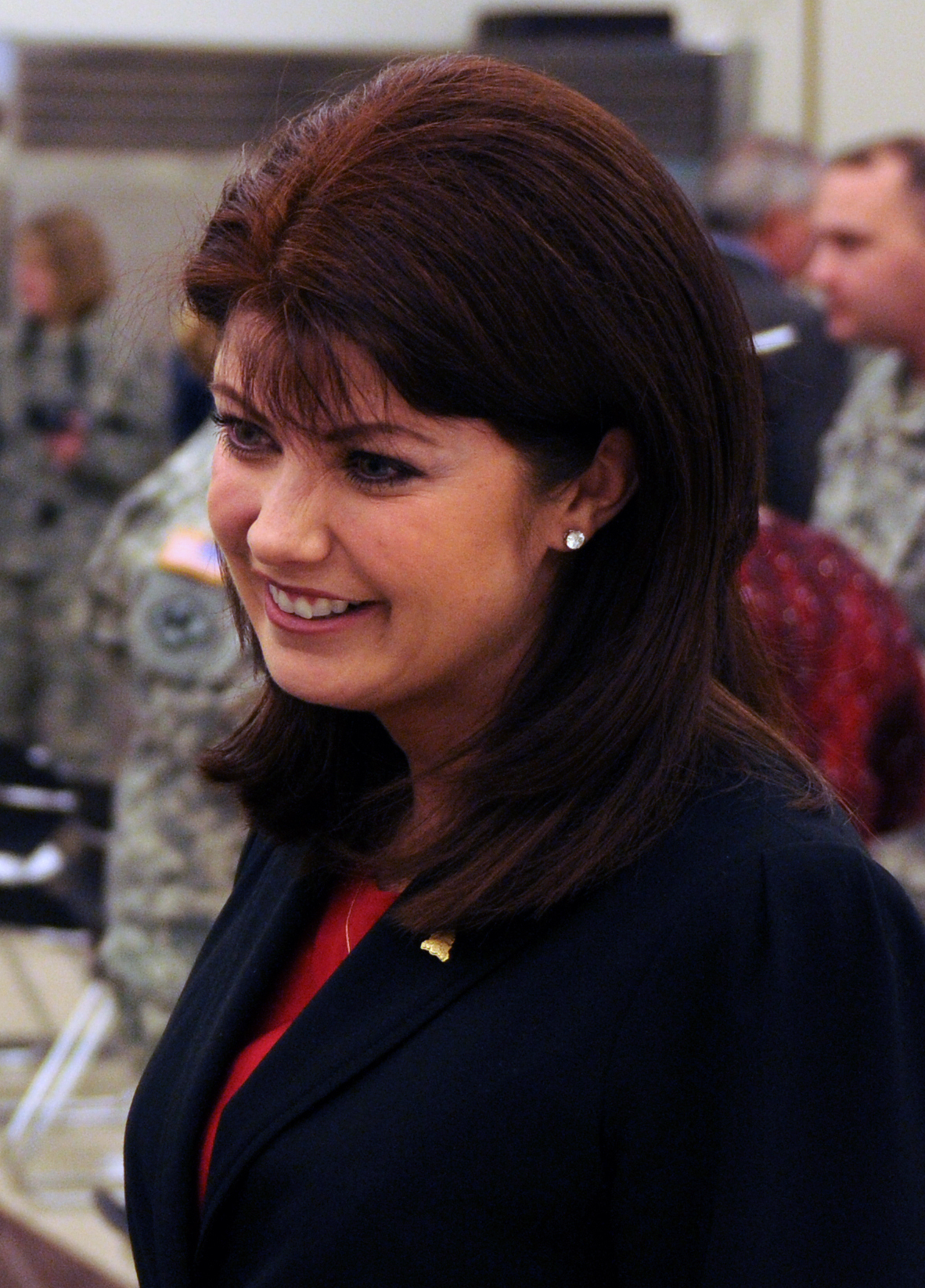
- Kleefisch in 2013

44th Lieutenant Governor of Wisconsin
- In office January 3, 2011 – January 7, 2019
- Governor: Scott Walker
- Preceded by: Barbara Lawton
- Succeeded by: Mandela Barnes

Personal details
- Born: Rebecca Ann Reed; August 7, 1975 (age 50) Pontiac, Michigan, U.S.
- Party: Republican
- Spouse: Joel Kleefisch
- Children: 2
- Education: University of Wisconsin, Madison (BA)
- Website: Campaign website

Rebecca Ann Kleefisch (née Reed; born August 7, 1975) is an American politician and former television reporter who served as the 44th Lieutenant Governor of Wisconsin from 2011 to 2019. A member of the Republican Party, she was elected to the position on November 2, 2010, as the running mate of Governor Scott Walker; the pair narrowly lost reelection to a third term in 2018.

Kleefisch was a candidate in the 2022 Wisconsin gubernatorial election, but lost the Republican nomination to businessman Tim Michels in the August 9 primary.

== Early life, education, and career ==
Rebecca Ann Reed was born in Pontiac, Michigan. Her family later relocated to Ohio, where she won the Miss Ohio Teen USA 1994 title. On August 16, 1994, she competed in the nationally televised Miss Teen USA 1994 pageant as Miss Ohio Teen USA in Biloxi, Mississippi, but did not place in the competition. Reed graduated from the University of Wisconsin–Madison. She was a reporter for WIFR-TV in Rockford, Illinois, and then was a reporter and later morning anchor for WISN-TV in Milwaukee, before leaving in 2004. Kleefisch formed her own company, Rebecca Kleefisch Enterprises and was a contributor to Charlie Sykes' program on WTMJ Radio in Milwaukee.

== Political positions ==
=== Abortion ===
Kleefisch supports Wisconsin's 1849 abortion ban that went into effect in 2022 after the Dobbs v. Jackson Women's Health Organization decision by the United States Supreme Court eliminated the constitutional right to an abortion in the United States. The law bans abortion in all instances except to save the life of the mother. Kleefisch believes that abortion should be illegal in all other instances, including after rape or incest, or to protect the health of the mother. As lieutenant governor, she expressed support for the view that women who have become pregnant due to rape should "'turn lemons into lemonade'" by carrying their pregnancies to term.

=== Marriage rights ===
In 2010, Kleefisch compared marrying a same-sex partner to marrying an animal or an inanimate object. In a radio interview, she said:

"This is a slippery slope. In addition to that at what point are we going to be OK marrying inanimate objects? Can I marry this table or this, you know, clock? Can we marry dogs? This is ridiculous. And biblically, again, I'm going to go right back to my fundamental Christian beliefs [that] marriage is between one man and one woman".

She later apologized for her "poor choice of words".

In 2022, Kleefisch expressed support for same-sex marriage, saying: "I am in the same place that I would say as a vast majority of Wisconsinites and Americans are. My opinion has changed . . . gay marriage will be legal when I am governor of Wisconsin."

=== Health care ===
Kleefisch opposes the Affordable Care Act (ACA) and has supported efforts to repeal the legislation. She has called the ACA "an abomination."

=== Other positions ===
Kleefisch criticized Wisconsin's progressive income tax system and has promised "transformational income tax reform" if she were to become governor. She suggested eliminating taxes on retirement income.

Kleefisch is open to paid family leave, saying "we need to make sure that moms and dads have time to bond with their babies. That's absolutely something that I would look at as governor."

In 2009, Kleefisch said that there is "no consensus that people have caused climate change."

In 2012, when she faced a recall election, Kleefisch criticized the recall process, arguing that it has become a "spectacle" and were designed only to recall officials guilty of grave wrongdoing, rather than used as a way to resolve policy disputes. In 2021, however, Kleefisch championed the recall election of four Mequon-Thiensville School District over policy disputes. In 2022, she proposed removing some election-related powers from the bipartisan Wisconsin Elections Commission and transferring them to the state Department of Justice, headed by the elected state attorney general.

In 2020, she praised Donald Trump's trade policies, as well as his handling of the COVID-19 pandemic. After Trump lost the 2020 presidential election and made false claims of fraud while refusing to concede, she defended Trump's false claims of fraud.

In 2021, she called for a ban on sanctuary cities, as well as a ban on the teaching of critical race theory in public schools.

== Lieutenant Governor of Wisconsin ==
Although Kleefisch's husband Joel had been a member of the Wisconsin State Assembly since being elected in 2004, Kleefisch's own first entry into politics began when she ran for Lieutenant Governor in 2010. During her Republican primary campaign, Scott Jensen was her strategist; she made appeals to conservative talk radio hosts and Tea Party groups, as well as social conservatives and the Christian right, circulating a flier saying that, if elected, she would be "relying on the wisdom and faith she has in Jesus." In the primary election, she defeated four rivals, including Brett Davis, who had support from the party establishment and was favored by Scott Walker, the Republican candidate for governor. In the November 2010 general election, she won election on a single ticket as Walker's running mate.

Kleefisch spent eight years as lieutenant governor under Walker. Along with Walker, Kleefisch played a major role in supporting and promoting the $3 billion incentive package to Foxconn.

In 2018, Kleefisch claimed that her campaign opponent Mandela Barnes was kneeling during the U.S. national anthem protests at the Wisconsin State Fair. She later apologized for making the claim.

=== 2012 recall ===
Following a contentious collective bargaining dispute in 2011, an effort began to recall Walker and Kleefisch. After examining petitions, the Wisconsin Government Accountability Board determined there were more than 800,000 valid signatures to hold a recall election. In the June 5, 2012 recall election, Walker and Kleefisch were retained in office. Kleefisch is the only lieutenant governor in the history of any state in the United States to face recall election and ultimately survive a recall.

== Post-lieutenant governorship ==
In January 2019, Kleefisch was appointed to serve as the executive director of the Women's Suffrage Centennial Commission. She served in that position until becoming a Jobs Ambassador for Associated Builders and Contractors of Wisconsin in November 2019. As a jobs ambassador, she promotes careers in the skilled construction trades.

=== 2022 gubernatorial campaign ===
In September 2021, Kleefisch announced that she would seek the Republican nomination for Governor of Wisconsin in the following year's election. In her announcement, she likened herself to Donald Trump. She began her campaign by criticizing the leadership of incumbent Democratic Governor Tony Evers and attacking his response to the 2020 Kenosha unrest. In October 2021, she told Republicans that they needed to "hire mercenaries" and engage in "ballot harvesting" (a practice she has called for banning) to help her win the 2022 race. In November 2021, she said that a vaccine requirement for poll workers in Wisconsin was intended to prevent Republicans from becoming poll workers and thus hide wrongdoing. Kleefisch recently sued the Wisconsin Elections Commission, alleging that they broke the law during the 2020 election.

During her campaign, Kleefisch initially recognized that Biden won the 2020 election but by early 2022, she declined to take a position on the matter. In April 2022, Kleefisch said that the election was "rigged." On decertifying the results of the 2020 election in Wisconsin, Kleefisch said it is "not constitutionally possible."

Kleefisch received the endorsement of former governor Walker months ahead of the primary, and was long regarded as the front-runner in the race. However, a June 2022 endorsement of her opponent Tim Michels by Donald Trump, along with a July endorsement Michels by former governor Tommy Thompson, helped Michels to narrow the gap between them. Kleefisch was defeated in the primary by Michels, who himself went on to lose the general election to incumbent Evers.

== Personal life ==
Kleefisch is married to former State Representative Joel Kleefisch, who was also a reporter for WISN-TV. They have two daughters. They lived in Oconomowoc, located 16 miles west of Waukesha, Wisconsin, and were members of Crosspoint Community Church, a Christian & Missionary Alliance-affiliated megachurch in Oconomowoc. Since losing re-election, Kleefisch and her family moved to Concord, Wisconsin.

In late August 2010, Kleefisch was diagnosed with colon cancer. She had a tumor removed in early September 2010, and finished chemotherapy treatment by April 2011.

== Electoral history ==
2018 Wisconsin gubernatorial election
Party	Candidate	Votes	%
Democratic	Tony Evers/Mandela Barnes	1,324,648	49.6
Republican	Scott Walker/Rebecca Kleefisch (Incumbent)	1,293,799	48.4
Libertarian	Phil Anderson/Patrick Baird	20,320	0.8
Democratic gain from Republican			

2014 Wisconsin gubernatorial election
Party	Candidate	Votes	%
Republican	Scott Walker/Rebecca Kleefisch (Incumbent)	1,259,031	52.29
Democratic	Mary Burke/John Lehman	1,121,490	46.58
Libertarian	Robert Burke/Joseph Brost	18,375	0.49
Independent	Dennis Fehr	9,004	0.37
Majority		137,541	5.71%
Total votes		2,407,900	100
Republican hold			

2012 Wisconsin lieutenant governor recall election
Party	Candidate	Votes	%
Republican	Rebecca Kleefisch (Incumbent)	1,301,739	52.9
Democratic	Mahlon Mitchell	1,156,520	47.1
Total votes		2,458,259	100.0
Republican hold			

2010 Wisconsin gubernatorial election
Party	Candidate	Votes	%	±%
Republican	Scott Walker/ Rebecca Kleefisch	1,128,941	52.29%	+6.93%
Democratic	Tom Barrett/ Tom Nelson	1,004,303	46.52%	−6.24%
Independent	Third Party/ Write-In	25,730	1.19%	
Majority		124,638	5.77%	−1.62%
Turnout		2,158,974		
Republican gain from Democratic		Swing		

2010 Wisconsin lieutenant governor Republican primary election
Party	Candidate	Votes	%	±
Republican	Rebecca Kleefisch	258,714	46.78	
Republican	Brett Davis	139,997	25.31	
Republican	Dave Ross	80,617	14.58	
Republican	Robert Gerald Lorge	52,076	9.42	
Republican	Nick Voegeli	21,040	3.80	

== See also ==
- List of female lieutenant governors in the United States

Party political offices
Preceded by Jean Hundertmark	Republican nominee for Lieutenant Governor of Wisconsin; 2010, 2012, 2014, 2018	Succeeded by Roger Roth
Political offices
Preceded by Barbara Lawton	Lieutenant Governor of Wisconsin; 2011–2019	Succeeded by Mandela Barnes
