= Jon Plumer =

American politician (born 1955)

Member of the Wisconsin State Assembly from the 42nd district
- In office June 25, 2018 – January 6, 2025
- Preceded by: Keith Ripp
- Succeeded by: Maureen McCarville

Personal details
- Born: March 1, 1955 (age 71) Sterling, Illinois, U.S.
- Party: Republican
- Children: 4
- Occupation: salesman, politician
- Website: Official website

Jon Plumer (born March 1, 1955) is an American Republican politician and retired salesman. He was a member of the Wisconsin State Assembly, representing the 42nd Assembly district since winning a June 2018 special election until his retirement in 2025.

== Biography ==
Plumer won a special election, held on June 12, 2018, against Democrat Ann Groves Lloyd. He subsequently won a rematch with Groves Lloyd in the 2018 general election.

Wisconsin State Assembly
Preceded by Keith Ripp	Member of the Wisconsin State Assembly from the 42nd district June 25, 2018 – January 6, 2025	Succeeded by Maureen McCarville
