= Keith Ripp =

American politician (born 1961)

Member of the Wisconsin State Assembly
- In office January 7, 2013 – December 29, 2017
- Preceded by: Fred Clark
- Succeeded by: Jon Plumer
- Constituency: 42nd district
- In office January 5, 2009 – January 7, 2013
- Preceded by: Eugene Hahn
- Succeeded by: Robb Kahl
- Constituency: 47th district

Personal details
- Born: November 13, 1961 (age 64) Madison, Wisconsin
- Party: Republican
- Spouse: Lori Ripp
- Profession: Politician
- Website: Official website

Keith Ripp (born November 13, 1961) is a Wisconsin politician.

Ripp was born in Madison, Wisconsin and was raised in Lodi. He graduated from Lodi High School in 1980, and took farming courses from the University of Wisconsin–Madison.

Ripp continues to run the family farm in northern Dane County, Wisconsin. He is a former president of the Wisconsin Soybean Marketing Board and the Wisconsin Corn Growers Association.

Ripp served as a supervisor for the Town of Dane from 2006 to 2009. He was elected to the Wisconsin State Assembly in 2008. Ripp resigned from the Assembly on December 29, 2017, to become the assistant deputy secretary of the Wisconsin Department of Agriculture, Trade and Consumer Protection.
