= William Penterman =

American politician (born 1996)

Member of the Wisconsin State Assembly
- Incumbent
- Assumed office January 6, 2025
- Preceded by: Barbara Dittrich
- Constituency: 38th district
- In office July 26, 2021 – January 6, 2025
- Preceded by: John Jagler
- Succeeded by: Mark Born
- Constituency: 37th district

Personal details
- Born: May 18, 1996 (age 30) Kaukauna, Wisconsin, U.S.
- Party: Republican
- Education: Ripon College (BA)
- Website: Official website

Military service
- Allegiance: United States
- Branch/service: United States Army; U.S. Army Reserve
- Years of service: 2015–2019 (USA); 2019–present (USAR)
- Unit: Military Police Corps

William L. Penterman (born May 18, 1996) is an American dairy farmer and Republican politician from Columbus, Wisconsin. He is a member of the Wisconsin State Assembly, representing Wisconsin's 38th Assembly district since 2025; he previously represented the 37th Assembly district from July 2021 through January 2025.

== Biography ==
Penterman was born and raised in Wisconsin, working on his family's dairy farm. He attended Ripon College, and while there founded Ripon College's chapter of Young Americans for Freedom—a Conservative youth organization.

Penterman served in the United States Army from 2015 through 2019, in the Military Police Corps, and continues to serve in the United States Army Reserve.

He worked as a legislative assistant in the Wisconsin State Assembly, and was clerk to the Assembly Committee on Campaigns and Elections during the post-election challenges to the results of the 2020 United States presidential election.

In 2021, the 37th State Assembly district became vacant when incumbent John Jagler won a special election to the Wisconsin State Senate. Penterman declared his candidacy and narrowly won a crowded eight-candidate Republican primary. He went on to win the special election with 54% over Democrat Pete Adams.

Penterman won re-election against Dane County Board of Supervisors member, Maureen McCarville in November 2022. In 2024, he defeated Democrat Izzy Nevarez in the 38th assembly district.

== Electoral history ==
=== Wisconsin Assembly, 37th district (2021, 2022) ===
Year	Election	Date	Elected				Defeated				Total	Plurality
2021 (special)	Primary	Jun. 15	William Penterman	Republican	758	19.81%	Jennifer Meinhardt	Rep.	742	19.39%	3,827	16
2021 (special)	Primary	Jun. 15	William Penterman	Republican	758	19.81%	Debbie Jacques	Rep.	621	16.23%	3,827	16
2021 (special)	Primary	Jun. 15	William Penterman	Republican	758	19.81%	Nick Krueger	Rep.	536	14.01%	3,827	16
2021 (special)	Primary	Jun. 15	William Penterman	Republican	758	19.81%	Nathan Pollnow	Rep.	514	13.43%	3,827	16
2021 (special)	Primary	Jun. 15	William Penterman	Republican	758	19.81%	Steve Kauffeld	Rep.	434	11.34%	3,827	16
2021 (special)	Primary	Jun. 15	William Penterman	Republican	758	19.81%	Jenifer Quimby	Rep.	182	4.76%	3,827	16
2021 (special)	Primary	Jun. 15	William Penterman	Republican	758	19.81%	Cathy Houchin	Rep.	39	1.02%	3,827	16
2021 (special)	Special	Jul. 13	William Penterman	Republican	3,742	54.10%	Pete Adams	Dem.	3,063	44.28%	6,917	679
2021 (special)	Special	Jul. 13	William Penterman	Republican	3,742	54.10%	Stephen W. Ratzlaff Jr.	Ind.	112	1.62%	6,917	679
2022	General	Nov. 8	William Penterman (inc)	Republican	15,343	55.77%	Maureen McCarville	Dem.	12,154	44.18%	27,509	3,189

=== Wisconsin Assembly, 38th district (2024) ===
Year	Election	Date	Elected				Defeated				Total	Plurality
2024	General	Nov. 5	William Penterman	Republican	22,163	67.27%	Izzy Hassey Nevarez	Dem.	10,745	32.61%	32,948	11,418

Wisconsin State Assembly
Preceded by John Jagler	Member of the Wisconsin State Assembly from the 37th district July 26, 2021 – January 6, 2025	Succeeded by Mark Born
Preceded by Barbara Dittrich	Member of the Wisconsin State Assembly from the 38th district January 6, 2025 – present	Incumbent
