= Cindi Duchow =

American politician (born 1959)

Member of the Wisconsin State Assembly
- Incumbent
- Assumed office January 6, 2025
- Preceded by: Scott Allen
- Constituency: 97th district
- In office October 9, 2015 – January 6, 2025
- Preceded by: Chris Kapenga
- Succeeded by: Barbara Dittrich
- Constituency: 99th district

Personal details
- Born: August 21, 1959 (age 67) Waukesha, Wisconsin, U.S.
- Party: Republican
- Education: University of Wisconsin–Madison (BS)
- Profession: Politician, retail manager
- Website: Official website

Cindi Duchow (born August 21, 1959) is an American retail manager and Republican politician from Waukesha County, Wisconsin. She is a member of the Wisconsin State Assembly, representing Wisconsin's 97th Assembly district since 2025; she previously represented the 99th Assembly district from 2015 to 2025. Earlier in her career, she served on the town board of Delafield, Wisconsin.

== Biography ==
Born in Waukesha, Wisconsin, Duchow received her bachelor's degree from the University of Wisconsin–Madison in marketing. She has worked as a manager or buyer for several retail merchants, as well as in her family's boat business.

She served on the Delafield Town Board and is a Republican. In September 2015, Duchow was elected to the State Assembly in a special election.

In November 2020, Duchow was elected by her colleagues to serve as the Majority Caucus Vice-Chair.

== Legislation ==
In the wake of the Waukesha Christmas parade attack, Duchow authored a constitutional amendment to allow court officials to consider previous convictions for a violent crime when setting bail. Court officials may also consider the probability that the accused will fail to appear in court, the need to protect members of the community from serious harm, the need to prevent the intimidation of witnesses, and potential affirmative defenses. Voters approved the constitutional amendment on April 4, 2023.

In January 2024, Duchow voted with 53 other Republicans to ban women in Wisconsin from obtaining abortion care after 14 weeks, except in cases of sexual assault or incest. The legislation required voters to approve the bill via referendum in the April 2024 election. The bill was opposed by Planned Parenthood, who called it part of "the consistent attack from legislative Republicans" on "reproductive rights and freedoms" that were "disruptive to health care."

Wisconsin State Assembly
Preceded by Chris Kapenga	Member of the Wisconsin State Assembly from the 99th district October 9, 2015 – January 6, 2025	Succeeded by Barbara Dittrich
Preceded by Scott Allen	Member of the Wisconsin State Assembly from the 97th district January 6, 2025 – present	Incumbent
