= Wisconsin's 38th Assembly district =

American legislative district in south-central Wisconsin

Wisconsin's 38th State Assembly district
- 2024 map defined in 2023 Wisc. Act 94; 2022 map defined in Johnson v. Wisconsin Elections Commission; 2011 map was defined in 2011 Wisc. Act 43
Assemblymember
William Penterman; R–Columbus
since January 6, 2025 (1 years)
- Demographics: 89.64% White; 1.17% Black; 5.92% Hispanic; 0.98% Asian; 1.42% Native American; 0.07% Hawaiian/Pacific Islander
- Population (2020) • Voting age: 59,247; 46,391
- Website: Official website
- Notes: South-central Wisconsin

The 38th Assembly district of Wisconsin is one of 99 districts in the Wisconsin State Assembly. Located in south-central Wisconsin, the district comprises parts of southern Dodge County and northern Jefferson County. It includes the cities of Watertown, Jefferson, Juneau, and Horicon, and the villages of Clyman, Hustisford, Iron Ridge, Johnson Creek, Lowell, and Reeseville. The district is represented by Republican William Penterman, since January 2025; Penterman previously represented the 37th district from July 2021 to January 2025.

The 38th Assembly district is located within Wisconsin's 13th Senate district, along with the 37th and 39th Assembly districts.

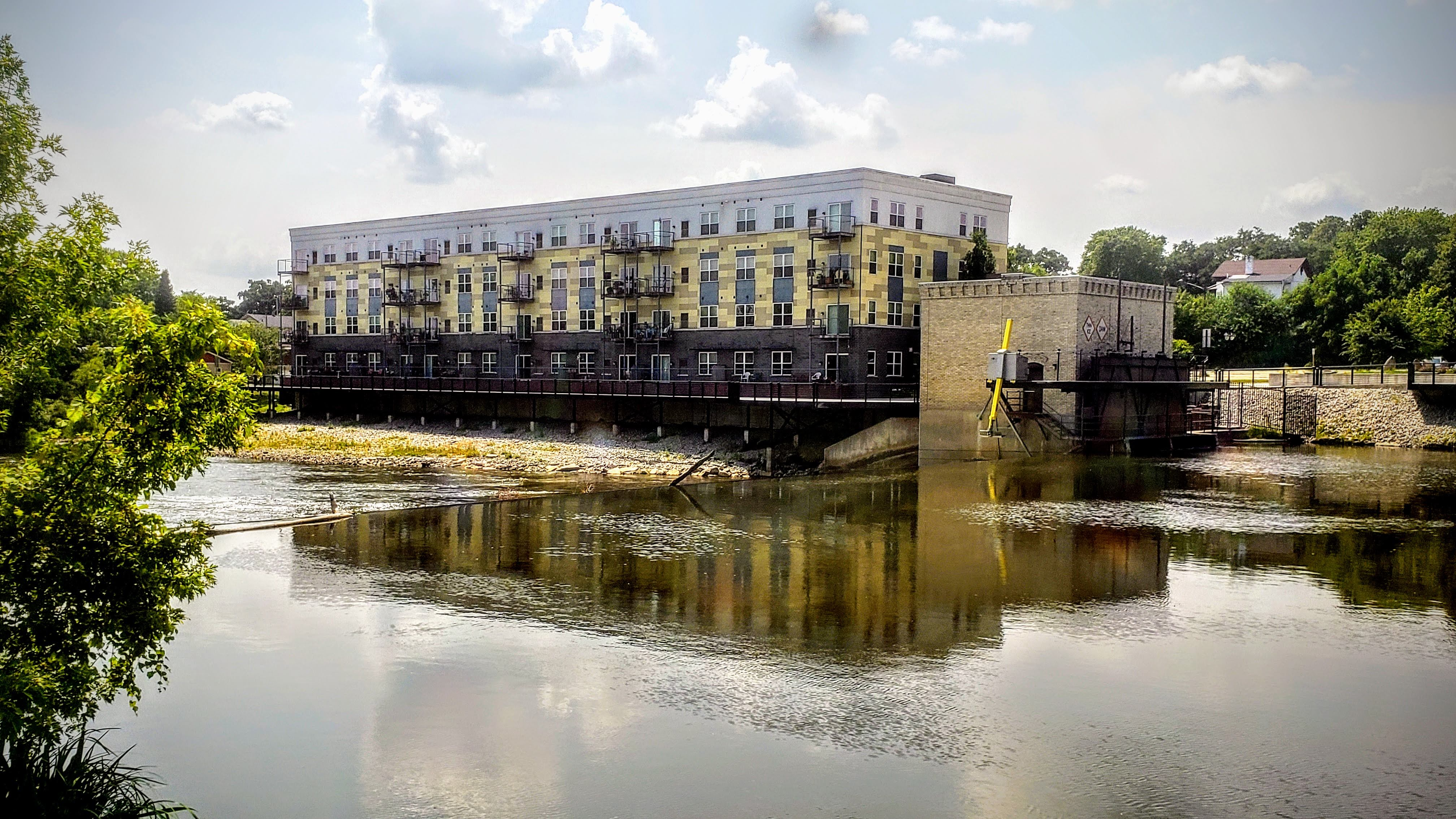
Watertown River Walk

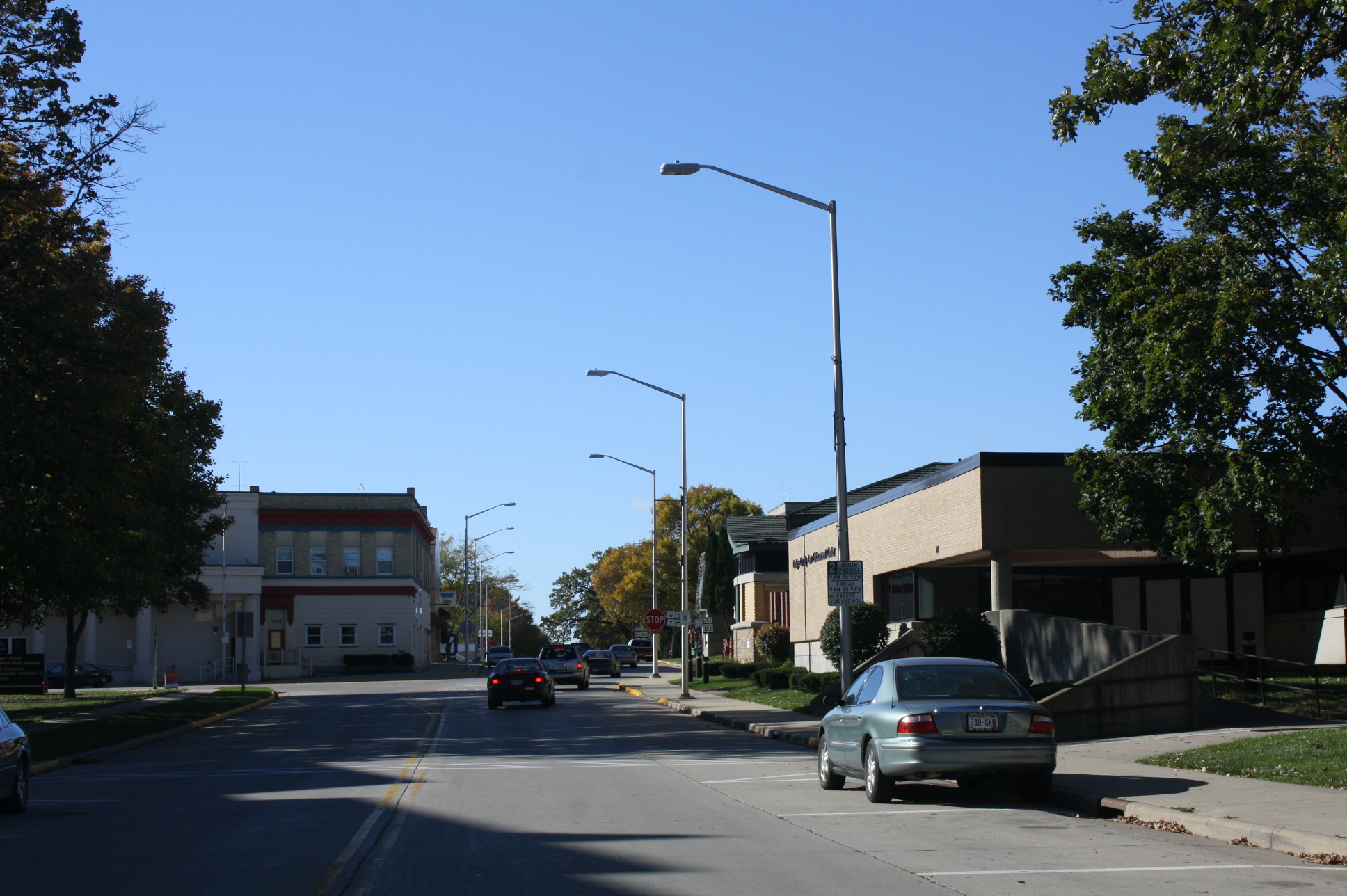
Downtown Juneau

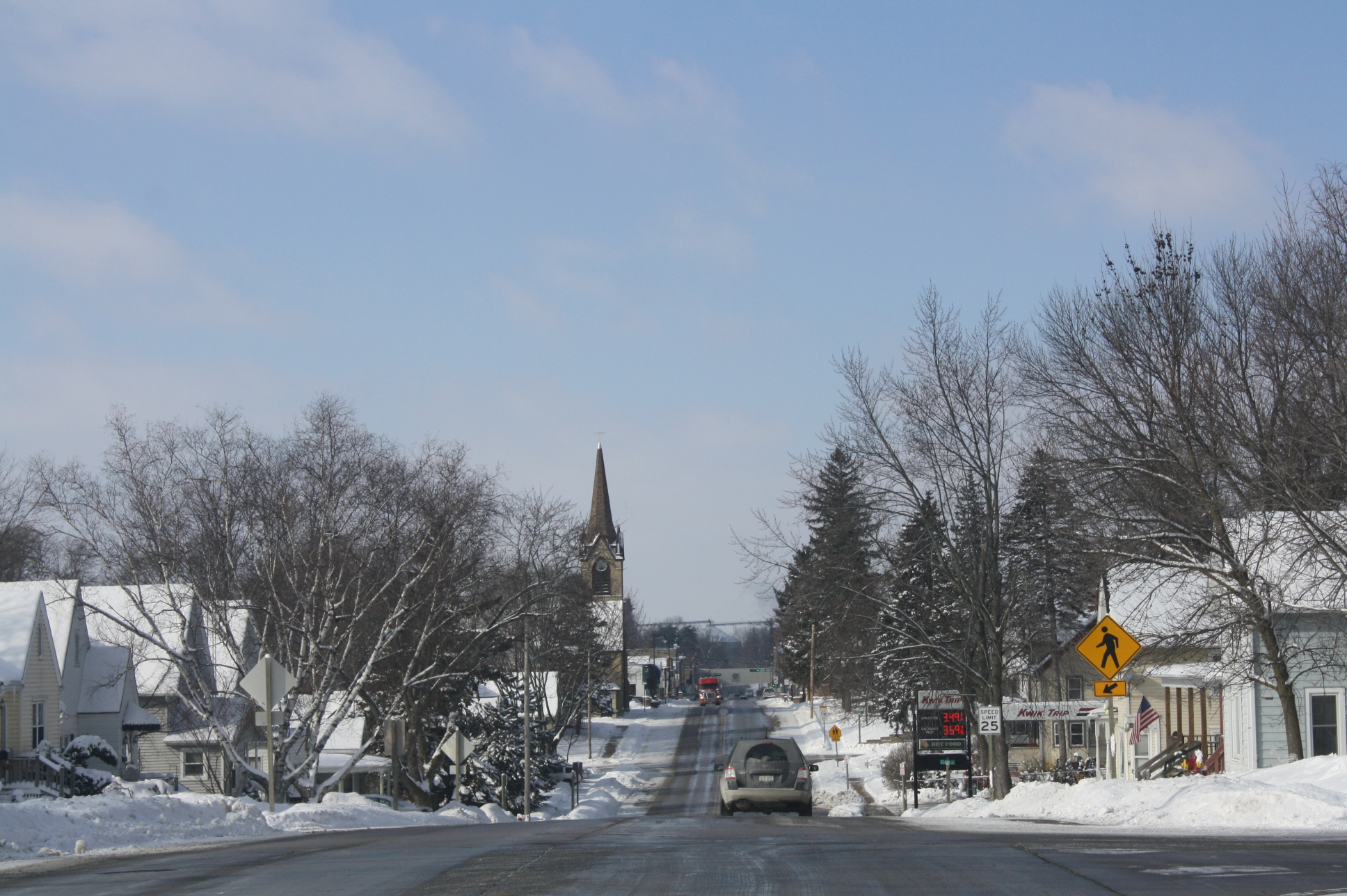
Downtown Horicon

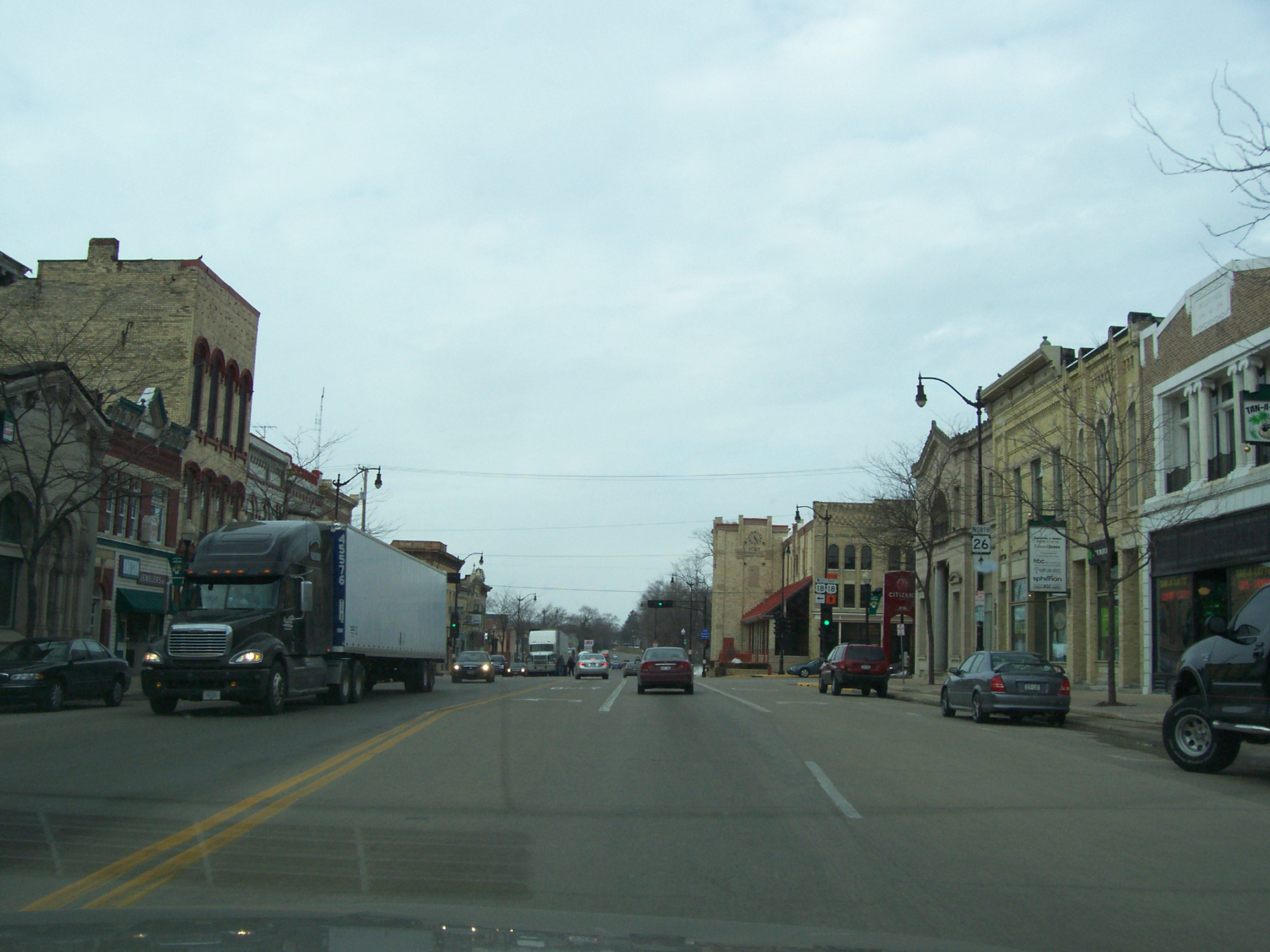
Downtown Jefferson

== List of past representatives ==
List of representatives to the Wisconsin State Assembly from the 38th district
Member	Party	Residence	Counties represented	Term start	Term end	Ref.
District created
Harland E. Everson	Dem.	Edgerton	Dane, Jefferson	January 1, 1973	January 3, 1983	
Joseph E. Tregoning	Rep.	Shullsburg	Iowa, Lafayette, Sauk	January 3, 1983	January 7, 1985	
Margaret S. Lewis	Rep.	Jefferson	Jefferson, Rock, Walworth	January 7, 1985	January 7, 1991	
Stephen Nass	Rep.	Whitewater	Jefferson, Rock, Walworth	January 7, 1991	January 4, 1993	
Steven Foti	Rep.	Oconomowoc	Dodge, Jefferson, Waukesha	January 4, 1993	January 3, 2005	
Joel Kleefisch	Rep.	Oconomowoc	Dodge, Jefferson, Waukesha	January 3, 2005	January 7, 2019	
Barbara Dittrich	Rep.	Oconomowoc	Dane, Jefferson, Waukesha	January 7, 2019	January 6, 2025	
William Penterman	Rep.	Columbus	Dodge, Jefferson	January 6, 2025	Current	
