= Wisconsin's 42nd Assembly district =

American legislative district in south-central Wisconsin

Wisconsin's 42nd State Assembly district
- 2024 map defined in 2023 Wisc. Act 94; 2022 map defined in Johnson v. Wisconsin Elections Commission; 2011 map was defined in 2011 Wisc. Act 43
Assemblymember
Maureen McCarville; D–DeForest
since January 6, 2025 (1 years)
- Demographics: 87.81% White; 2.88% Black; 4.35% Hispanic; 2.95% Asian; 1.64% Native American; 0.16% Hawaiian/Pacific Islander
- Population (2020) • Voting age: 59,201; 45,726
- Website: Official website
- Notes: South-central Wisconsin

The 42nd Assembly district of Wisconsin is one of 99 districts in the Wisconsin State Assembly. Located in south-central Wisconsin, the district comprises most of the southern half of Columbia County and part of northern Dane County. It includes the cities of Columbus and Lodi, and the villages of Arlington, DeForest, Doylestown, Fall River, Poynette, and Rio, as well as part of the north side of the city of Madison including the Greater Sandburg, American Center, Pumpkin Hollow and Truax neighborhoods. The district also contains Dane County Regional Airport, Madison Area Technical College, and the American Family Insurance corporate headquarters. The district is represented by Democrat Maureen McCarville, since January 2025.

The 42nd Assembly district is located within Wisconsin's 14th Senate district, along with the 40th and 41st Assembly districts.

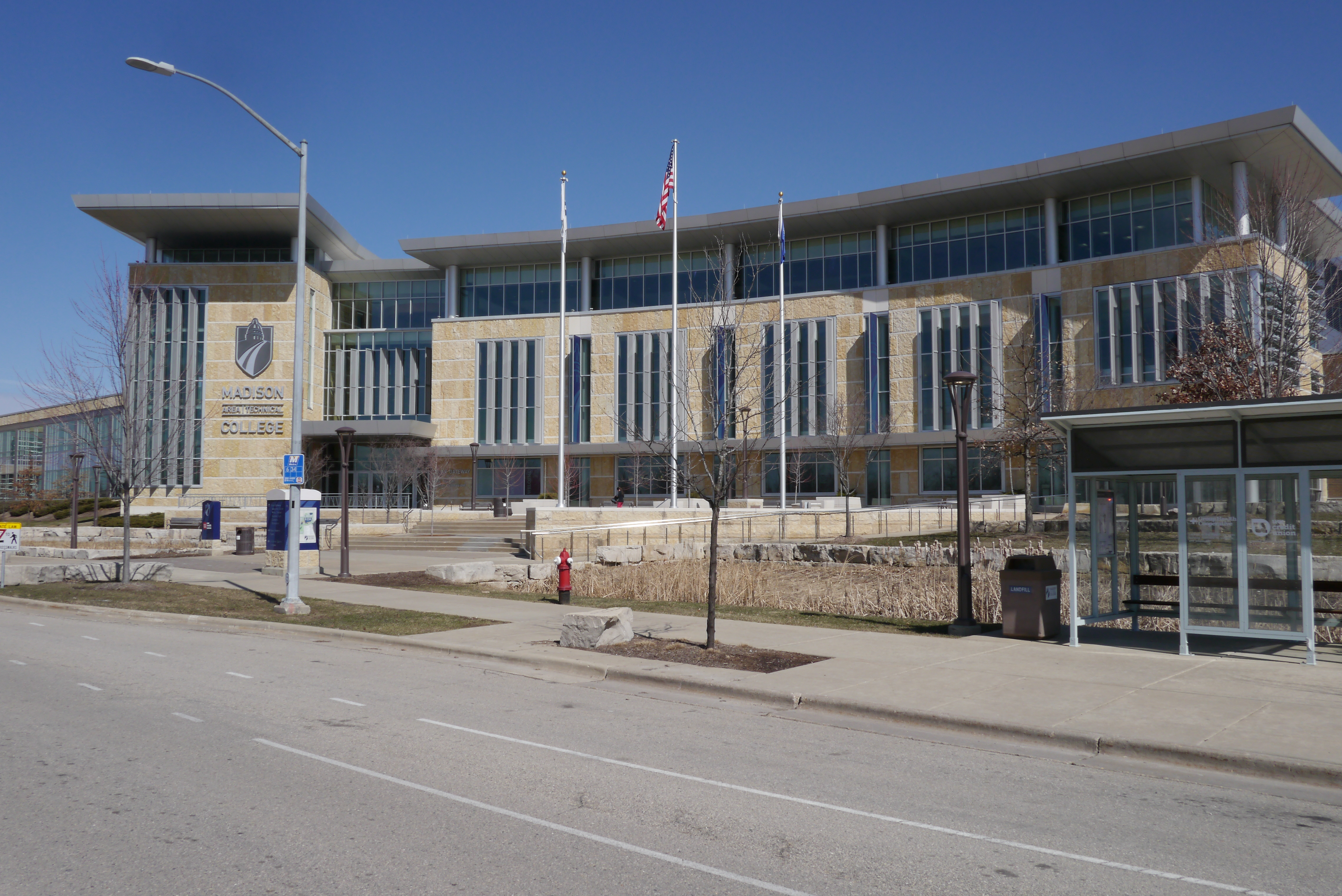
Madison Area Technical College

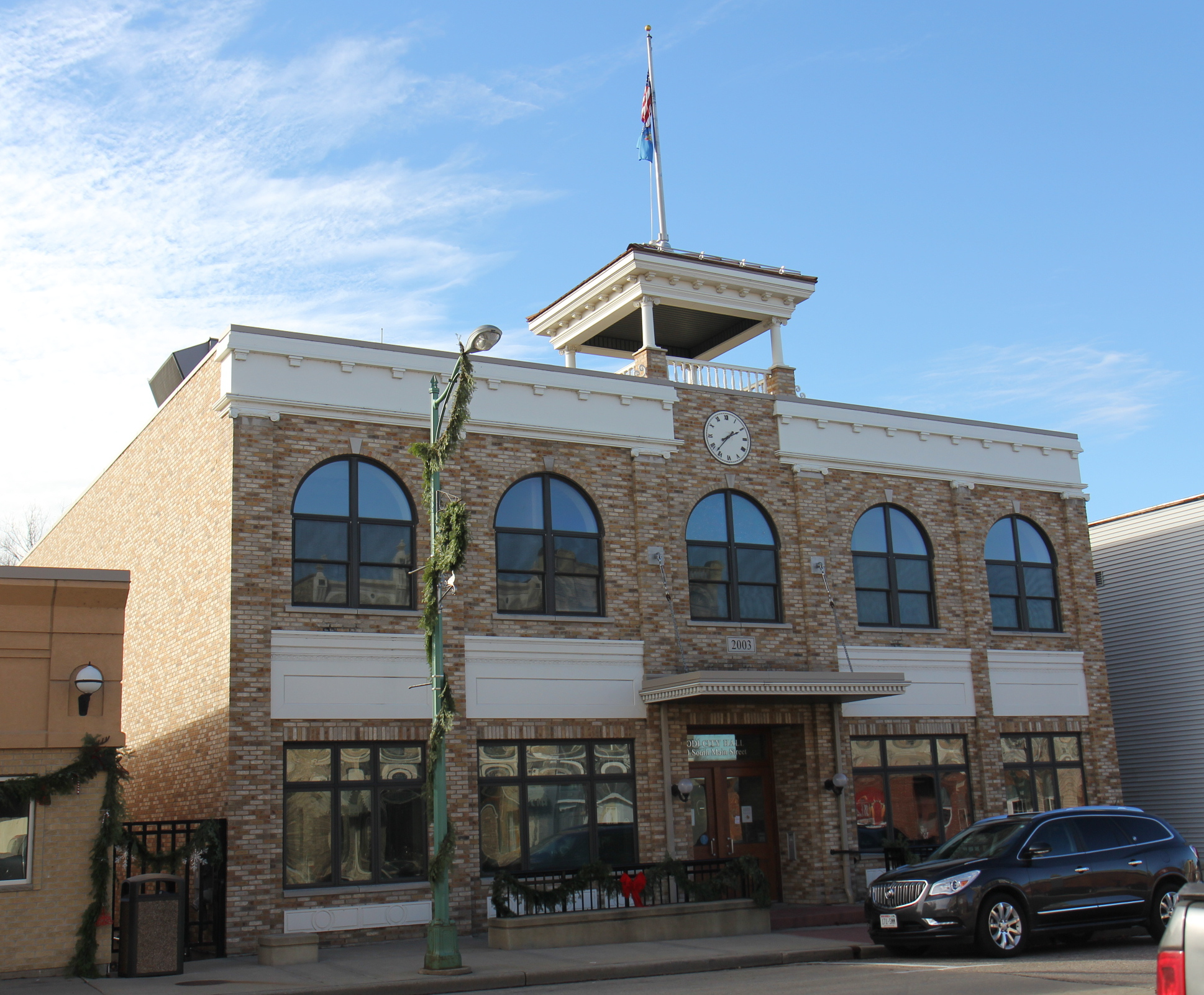
City Hall of Lodi

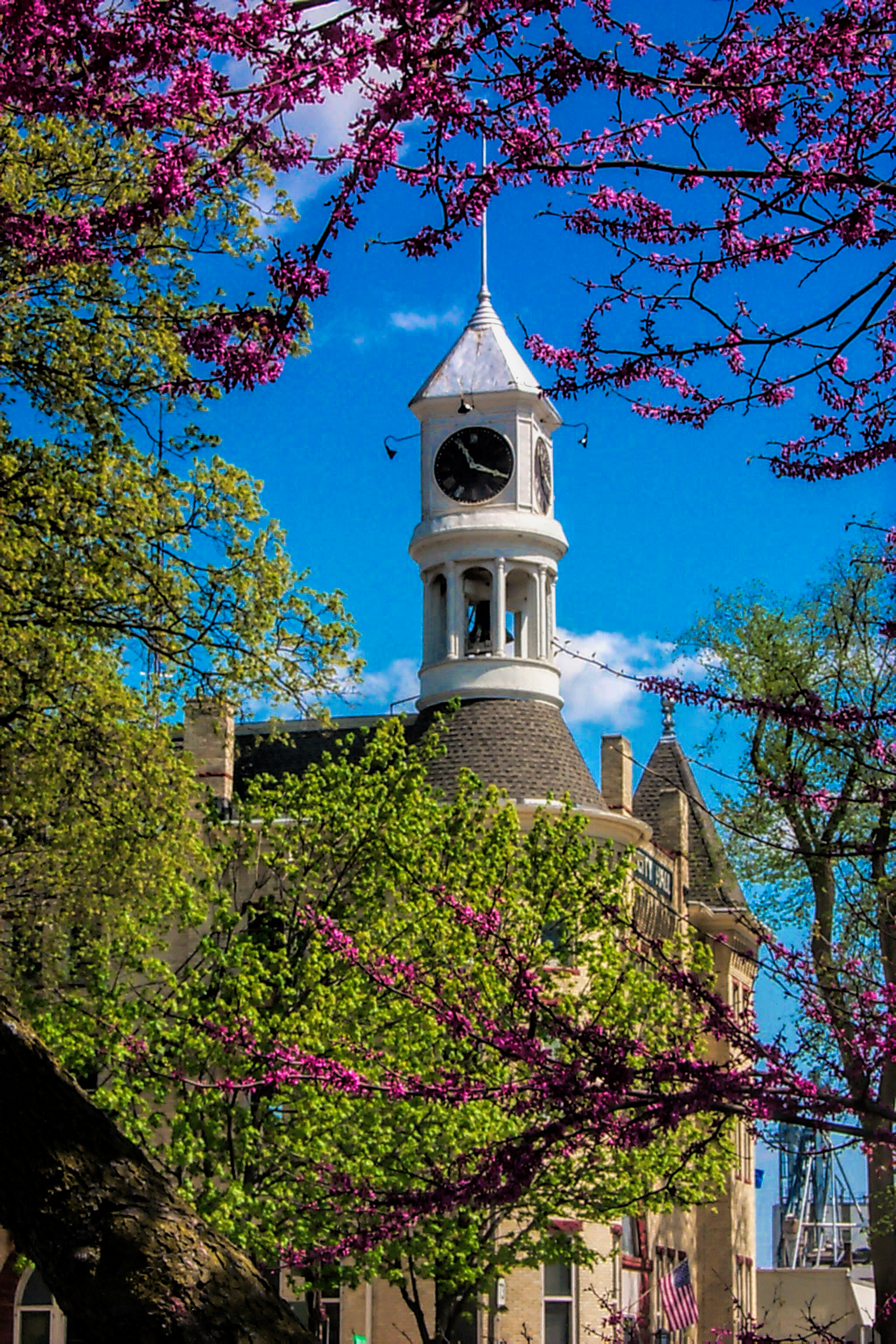
Historic City Hall, in Columbus

== History ==
The district was created in the 1972 redistricting act (1971 Wisc. Act 304) which first established the numbered district system, replacing the previous system which allocated districts to specific counties. The 42nd district was drawn roughly in line with the boundaries of the previous Outagamie County 1st district (almost all of the city of Appleton).

The 42nd district boundaries have shifted significantly over the various redistrictings of the state, but the location of the district has remained consistent in south-central Wisconsin since the 1983 redistricting.

== List of past representatives ==
List of representatives to the Wisconsin State Assembly from the 42nd district
Member	Party	Residence	Counties represented	Term start	Term end	Ref.
District created
Toby Roth	Rep.	Appleton	Outagamie	January 1, 1973	January 1, 1979	
David Prosser Jr.	Rep.	Appleton	Outagamie	January 1, 1979	January 3, 1983	
Harvey Stower	Dem.	Amery	Dunn, Burnett, Polk	January 3, 1983	January 7, 1985	
Tommy Thompson	Rep.	Elroy	Adams, Columbia, Marquette, Monroe, Sauk, Waushara	January 7, 1985	January 5, 1987	
Ben Brancel	Rep.	Douglas	Adams, Columbia, Marquette, Monroe, Sauk, Waushara	January 5, 1987	November 2, 1997	
Ben Brancel	Rep.	Douglas	Adams, Columbia, Marquette, Sauk	January 5, 1987	November 2, 1997	
--Vacant--			Adams, Columbia, Marquette, Sauk	November 2, 1997	January 20, 1998	
Joan Wade	Rep.	Montello	Adams, Columbia, Marquette, Sauk	January 20, 1998	September 1, 2001	
--Vacant--			Adams, Columbia, Marquette, Sauk	September 1, 2001	November 16, 2001	
Jacob Hines	Rep.	Oxford	Adams, Columbia, Marquette, Sauk	November 16, 2001	January 5, 2009	
Fred Clark	Dem.	Baraboo	Adams, Columbia, Marquette, Sauk	January 5, 2009	January 7, 2013	
Keith Ripp	Rep.	Lodi	Columbia, Dane, Dodge, Fond du Lac, Green Lake, Marquette	January 7, 2013	December 29, 2017	
--Vacant--			Columbia, Dane, Dodge, Fond du Lac, Green Lake, Marquette	December 29, 2017	June 25, 2018	
Jon Plumer	Rep.	Lodi	Columbia, Dane, Dodge, Fond du Lac, Green Lake, Marquette	June 25, 2018	January 6, 2025	
Jon Plumer	Rep.	Lodi	Columbia, Dodge, Fond du Lac, Green Lake, Marquette	June 25, 2018	January 6, 2025	
Maureen McCarville	Dem.	DeForest	Columbia, Dane	January 6, 2025	Current	
