= Barbara Dittrich =

American politician

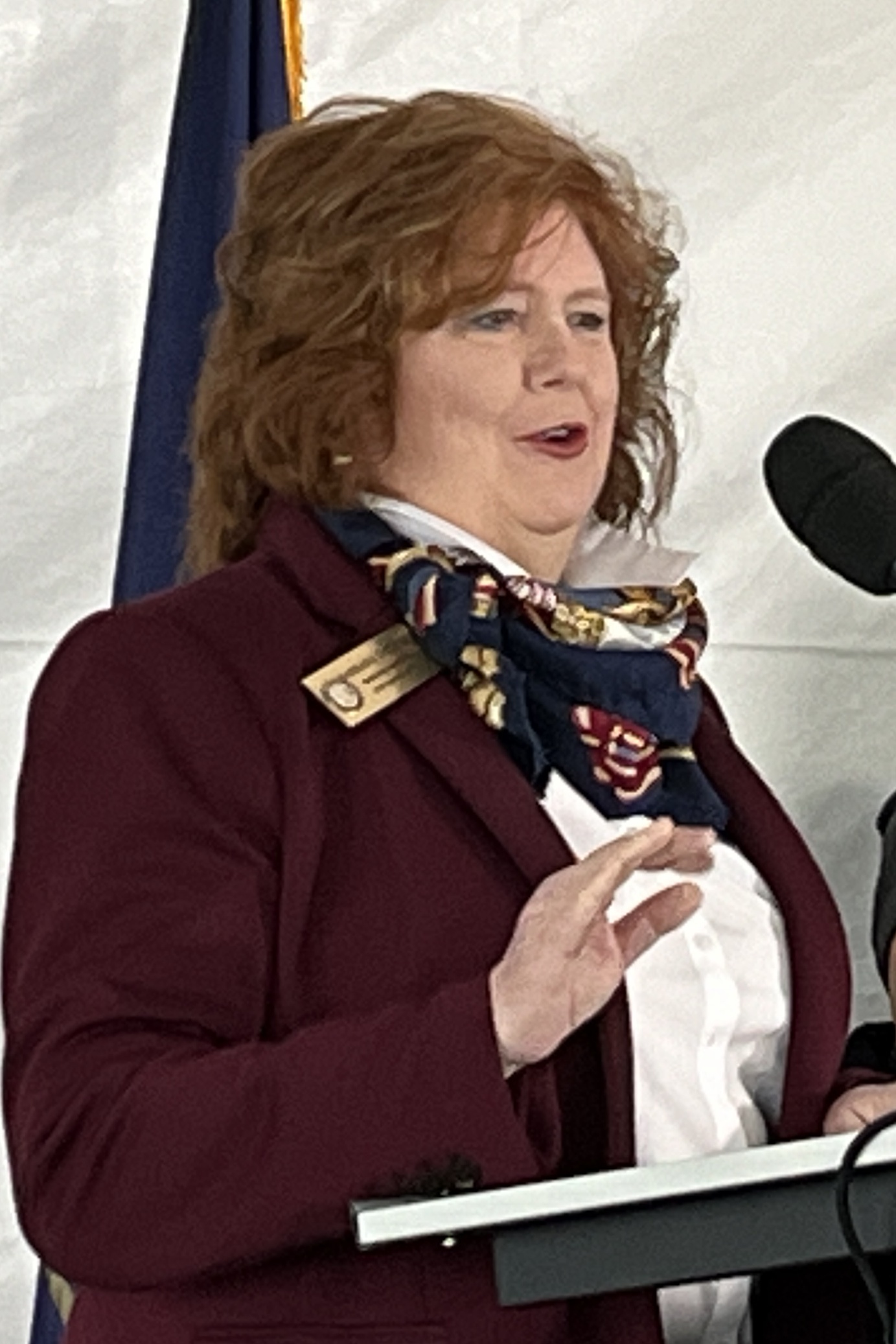

Member of the Wisconsin State Assembly
- Incumbent
- Assumed office January 6, 2025
- Preceded by: Cindi Duchow
- Constituency: 99th district
- In office January 7, 2019 – January 6, 2025
- Preceded by: Joel Kleefisch
- Succeeded by: William Penterman
- Constituency: 38th district

Personal details
- Born: May 21, 1964 (age 62) Milwaukee, Wisconsin, U.S.
- Party: Republican
- Children: 3
- Education: Waukesha County Technical College; University of Wisconsin–Milwaukee
- Profession: Politician

Barbara Dittrich (born May 21, 1964) is an American Republican politician from Waukesha County, Wisconsin. She is a member of the Wisconsin State Assembly, representing Wisconsin's 99th Assembly district since 2025; she previously represented the 38th Assembly district from 2019 to 2025.

== Political positions ==
Dittrich endorsed Patrick Testin in the 2022 race for Lieutenant Governor of Wisconsin.

Dittrich supports banning abortions, with exceptions for rape, incest and if the mother's life is in danger.

Dittrich has been accused of holding anti-LGBTQ stances since 2023 after forwarding legislation to ban transgender student-athletes from participating in girls' sports and for a bill that would require libraries to inform parents/guardians of anything checked out by people under the age of 16 in reaction to public complaints of libraries making LGBTQ-related material available to youths.

== Personal life ==
On March 7, 2022, Dittrich's daughter Sophie pleaded guilty to felony possession with intent to deliver psilocin and a misdemeanor charge of carrying a concealed weapon. These crimes occurred in Representative Dittrich's district while she was an elected official. Court records show that Sophie Dittrich resided at Barb Dittrich's home at the time of the crimes.

On March 10 of 2024, Sophie Dittrich was again arrested for felony possession of a firearm. She, while remanded to the Ellsworth Correctional Facility, again pleaded guilty to a felony. She remains at the correctional facility in Union Grove, Wisconsin for her crimes committed in Wisconsin. Sophie Dittrich pleaded guilty to gun charges and was sentenced to jail time with Huber work-release privileges.

Wisconsin State Assembly
Preceded by Joel Kleefisch	Member of the Wisconsin State Assembly from the 38th district January 7, 2019 – January 6, 2025	Succeeded by William Penterman
Preceded by Cindi Duchow	Member of the Wisconsin State Assembly from the 99th district January 6, 2025 – present	Incumbent
