= Jeffrey Mursau =

American politician, legislator, and business owner

Member of the Wisconsin State Assembly from the 36th district
- Incumbent
- Assumed office January 3, 2005
- Preceded by: Lorraine Seratti

Personal details
- Born: June 12, 1954 (age 72) Oconto Falls, Wisconsin
- Party: Republican
- Education: University of Wisconsin–Oshkosh
- Profession: Politician
- Website: Official website

Jeffrey Mursau (June 12, 1954) is a Wisconsin politician, legislator and business owner.

Born in Oconto Falls, Wisconsin, Mursau owned his business and served as president of the village of Crivitz, Wisconsin. Mursau has served in the Wisconsin State Assembly since 2005. In 2008 Mursau faced the closest contest of his career when he defeated progressive Democrat Stan Gruszynski by a three-point margin.

== Electoral history ==
=== Wisconsin Assembly (2004–present) ===
Year	Election	Date	Elected				Defeated				Total	Plurality
2004	Primary	Sep. 14	Jeffrey L. Mursau	Republican	2,130	51.40%	Robert M. Jones II (write-in)	Rep.	813	19.62%	4,144	1,317
2004	Primary	Sep. 14	Jeffrey L. Mursau	Republican	2,130	51.40%	Steven Paul Kircher	Rep.	746	18.00%	4,144	1,317
2004	Primary	Sep. 14	Jeffrey L. Mursau	Republican	2,130	51.40%	Roy W. Kluss	Rep.	455	10.98%	4,144	1,317
2004	General	Nov. 2	Jeffrey L. Mursau	Republican	14,713	56.29%	James W. Crawford	Dem.	11,202	42.85%	26,140	3,511
2006	General	Nov. 7	Jeffrey L. Mursau (inc)	Republican	10,436	54.13%	Kelly S. Parrson	Dem.	8,834	45.82%	19,278	1,602
2008	General	Nov. 4	Jeffrey L. Mursau (inc)	Republican	13,064	51.78%	Stan Gruszynski	Dem.	12,159	48.19%	25,229	905
2010	General	Nov. 2	Jeffrey L. Mursau (inc)	Republican	11,170	59.07%	Anne Woznicki	Dem.	7,735	40.90%	19,653	19,397
2012	General	Nov. 6	Jeffrey L. Mursau (inc)	Republican	15,886	59.05%	Dorothy Kegley	Dem.	10,997	40.88%	30,362	5,067
2014	General	Nov. 4	Jeffrey L. Mursau (inc)	Republican	18,504	99.86%	--Unopposed--				18,530	18,478
2016	General	Nov. 8	Jeffrey L. Mursau (inc)	Republican	22,899	99.92%	--Unopposed--				22,917	22,881
2018	General	Nov. 6	Jeffrey L. Mursau (inc)	Republican	16,938	66.99%	Tim Comer	Dem.	8,338	32.98%	25,283	8,600
2020	General	Nov. 3	Jeffrey L. Mursau (inc)	Republican	26,932	99.92%	--Unopposed--				26,954	26,910
2022	General	Nov. 8	Jeffrey L. Mursau (inc)	Republican	19,698	70.40%	Ben Murray	Dem.	8,262	29.53%	27,980	11,436
2024	General	Nov. 5	Jeffrey L. Mursau (inc)	Republican	24,905	70.77%	Ben Murray	Dem.	10,182	28.93%	35,190	14,723
