= Wisconsin's 37th Assembly district =

American legislative district in Dodge County and Fond du Lac County, Wisconsin

Wisconsin's 37th State Assembly district
- 2024 map defined in 2023 Wisc. Act 94; 2022 map defined in Johnson v. Wisconsin Elections Commission; 2011 map was defined in 2011 Wisc. Act 43
Assemblymember
Mark Born; R–Beaver Dam
since January 6, 2025 (1 years)
- Demographics: 86.46% White; 5.31% Black; 5.35% Hispanic; 0.88% Asian; 1.62% Native American; 0.05% Hawaiian/Pacific Islander
- Population (2020) • Voting age: 59,609; 47,579
- Website: Official website
- Notes: South-central Wisconsin

The 37th Assembly district of Wisconsin is one of 99 districts in the Wisconsin State Assembly. Located in east-central Wisconsin, the district comprises most of the northern half of Dodge County and part of southern Fond du Lac County. It includes the cities of Beaver Dam, Fox Lake, Mayville, and Waupun, and the villages of Brownsville, Lomira, Oakfield, and Randolph. The district also contains the Horicon Marsh State Wildlife Area. The district is represented by Republican Mark Born, since January 2025; Born previously represented the 39th district from 2013 to 2025.

The 37th Assembly district is located within Wisconsin's 13th Senate district, along with the 38th and 39th Assembly districts.

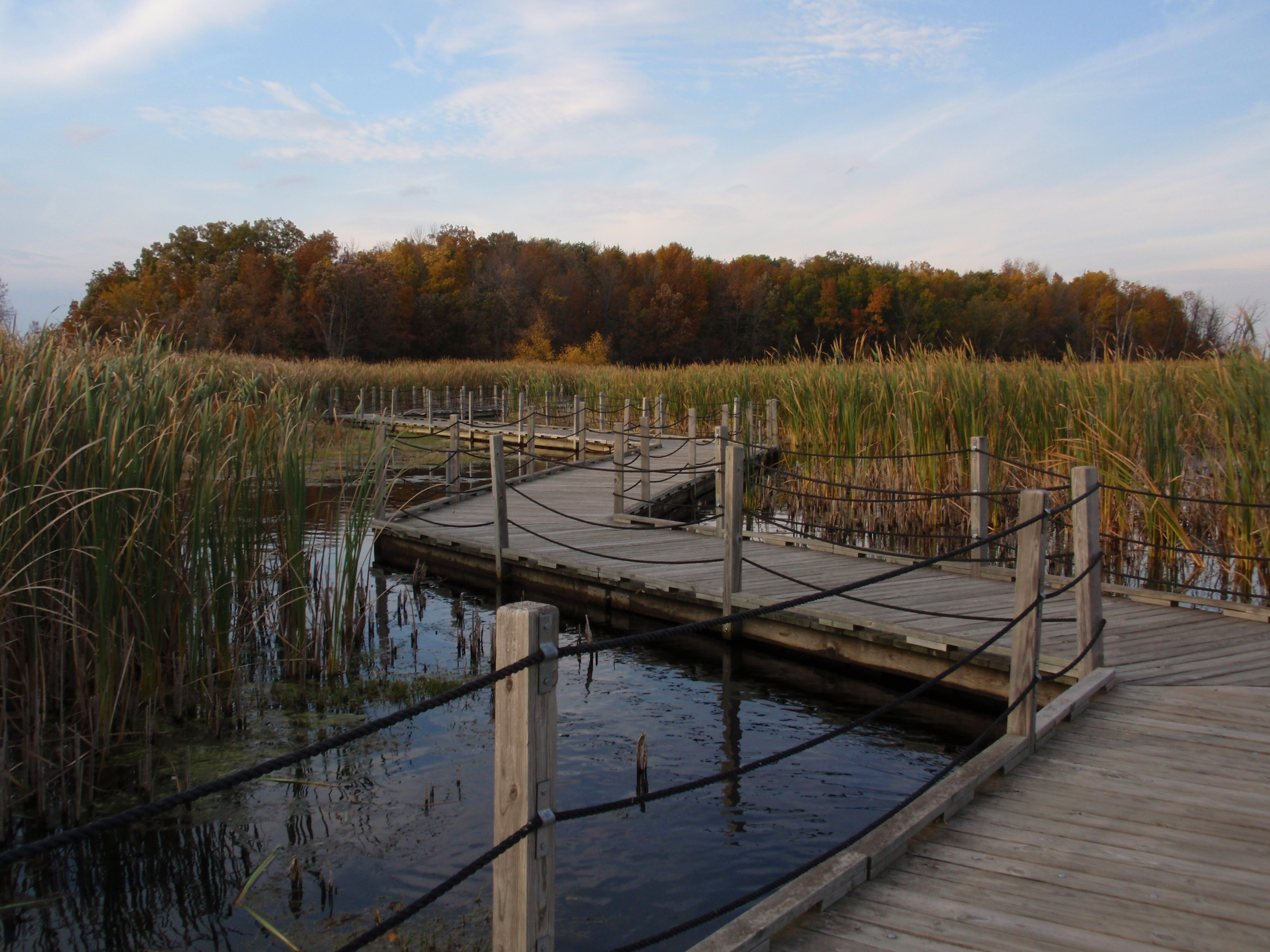
Path in the Horicon Marsh State Wildlife Area

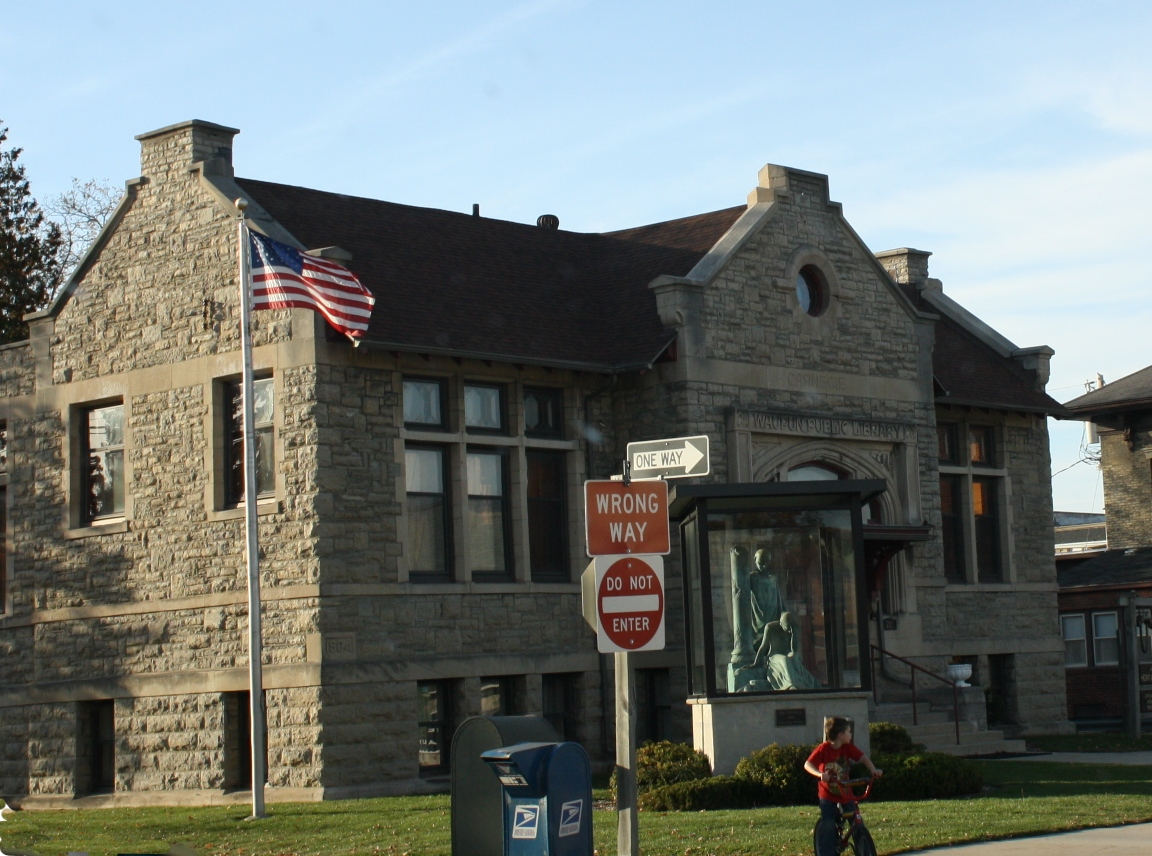
Historic Waupun Carnegie Library (now museum) in Waupun

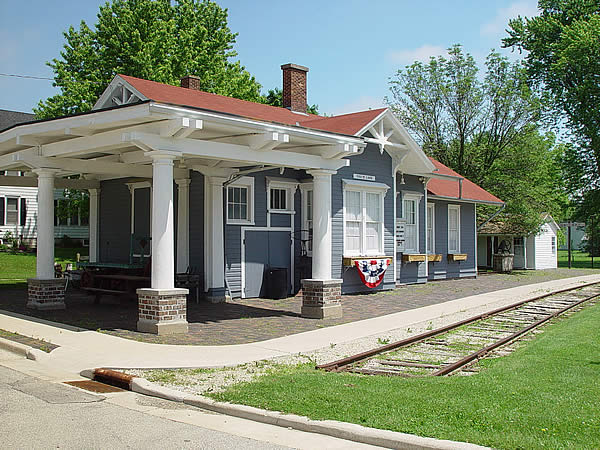
Fox Lake Railroad Depot

== List of past representatives ==
List of representatives to the Wisconsin State Assembly from the 37th district
Member	Party	Residence	Counties represented	Term start	Term end	Ref.
District created
Norman C. Anderson	Dem.	Madison	Dane	January 1, 1973	January 3, 1977	
Peter D. Bear	Dem.	Madison	Dane	January 3, 1977	January 1, 1979	
David Travis	Dem.	Madison	Dane	January 1, 1979	January 3, 1983	
John T. Manske	Rep.	Milton	Green, Rock	January 3, 1983	January 7, 1985	
Randall J. Radtke	Rep.	Lake Mills	Jefferson	January 7, 1985	January 4, 1993	
David W. Ward	Rep.	Fort Atkinson	Dane, Jefferson	January 4, 1993	August 2, 2006	
--Vacant--			Dane, Jefferson	August 2, 2006	January 1, 2007	
Andy Jorgensen	Dem.	Fort Atkinson	Dane, Jefferson	January 1, 2007	January 7, 2013	
John Jagler	Rep.	Watertown	Columbia, Dane, Dodge, Jefferson	January 7, 2013	April 23, 2021	
--Vacant--			Columbia, Dane, Dodge, Jefferson	April 23, 2021	July 26, 2021	
William Penterman	Rep.	Columbus	Columbia, Dane, Dodge, Jefferson	July 26, 2021	January 6, 2025	
Mark Born	Rep.	Beaver Dam	Dodge, Fond du Lac	January 6, 2025	Current	
