= Joel Kleefisch =

American politician (born 1971)

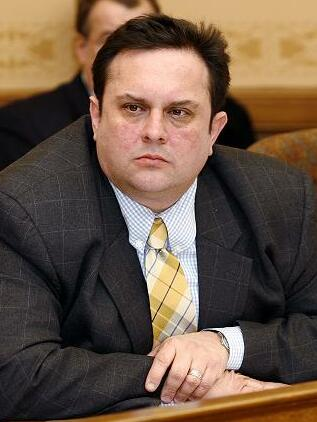
- Kleefisch in 2008

Member of the Wisconsin State Assembly from the 38th district
- In office January 3, 2005 – January 7, 2019
- Preceded by: Steven Foti
- Succeeded by: Barbara Dittrich

Second Gentleman of Wisconsin
- In role January 3, 2011 – January 7, 2019
- Governor: Scott Walker
- Preceded by: Cal Lawton
- Succeeded by: Vacant

Personal details
- Born: June 8, 1971 (age 55) Waukesha, Wisconsin, U.S.
- Party: Republican
- Spouse: Rebecca Reed
- Children: 2
- Education: Pepperdine University (BA)

Joel M. Kleefisch (/ˈkleɪfɪʃ/ KLAY-fish; born June 8, 1971) is a former American politician and a former television reporter who now works as a lobbyist. He served fourteen years in the Wisconsin State Assembly, representing parts of Waukesha, Jefferson, and eastern Dane counties. His wife, Rebecca Kleefisch, was the Lieutenant Governor of Wisconsin.

== Early life and education ==
Born in Waukesha, Wisconsin, Kleefisch graduated from Waukesha North High School in 1989. He earned a Bachelor of Arts from Pepperdine University in 1993.

== Career ==
Kleefisch worked as a news researcher for KCBS-TV in Los Angeles during the summer of 1992. Upon graduation from Pepperdine he worked as a reporter for WREX-TV in Rockford, Illinois from 1993 to 1994. Kleefisch then was hired by WISN-TV to work the assignment desk and as a part-time reporter in 1994, before becoming a full-time general assignment reporter, where he worked until entering politics. As a reporter at WISN-TV, he appeared on CNN to discuss the trial of Mark Chmura. He won an award for "Best investigative report or series" from the Milwaukee Press Club in 1999 for a piece about date rape drugs.

Kleefisch was elected to the Wisconsin State Assembly in 2004, and was re-elected in 2006, 2008, 2010, 2012, 2014, and 2016. He represented Oconomowoc and surrounding areas of western Waukesha County, northern Jefferson County, and eastern Dane County. In 2009 he co-sponsored legislation to increase the penalties in Wisconsin for driving under the influence.

During his tenure in the state assembly, video of Kleefisch casting votes for absent colleagues circulated. Amid accusations of hypocrisy related to recent legislation surrounding voter fraud, Kleefisch responded, "It depends on how you interpret the rule." During a segment on voting in the United States, John Oliver highlighted several politicians, and said in response to Kleefisch claiming the voting video was character assassination, "That’s not character assassination. That’s unedited footage of something you obviously did."

Kleefisch did not seek re-election in 2018 and was succeeded by Barbara Dittrich.

== Personal life ==
Kleefisch met his wife when she was also a reporter and anchor for WISN. They married in 1999 after she moved to the station from Rockford, Illinois. The couple have two children.
