= Wisconsin State Assembly =

Lower house of the Wisconsin Legislature

- Wisconsin State Legislature

Type
- Type: Lower house
- Term limits: None

History
- New session started: January 3, 2023

Leadership
- Speaker: Robin Vos (R) since January 7, 2013
- Speaker pro tempore: Kevin Petersen (R) since January 3, 2023
- Majority Leader: Tyler August (R) since January 3, 2023
- Minority Leader: Greta Neubauer (D) since January 10, 2022

Structure
- Seats: 99
- Political groups: Majority: Republican (54); Minority: Democratic (44); Independent Democrat (1)
- Length of term: 2 years
- Authority: Article IV, Wisconsin Constitution
- Salary: $57,408/year + $155.70 per diem

Elections
- Last election: November 5, 2024
- Next election: November 3, 2026
- Redistricting: Legislative control

Meeting place
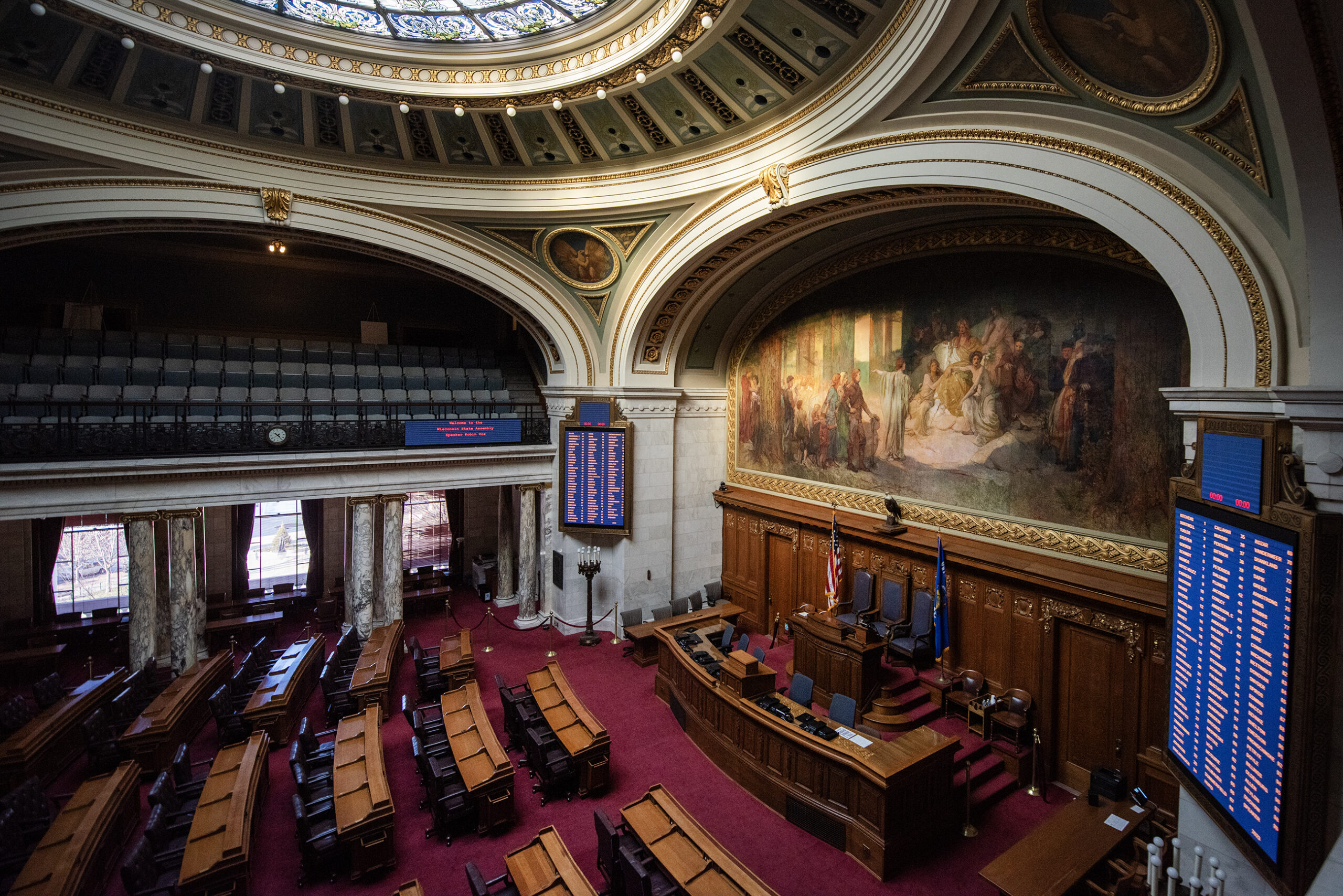
- State Assembly Chamber; Wisconsin State Capitol; Madison, Wisconsin

Website
- Wisconsin State Assembly

The Wisconsin State Assembly is the lower house of the Wisconsin State Legislature. Together with the smaller Wisconsin State Senate, the two constitute the legislative branch of the U.S. state of Wisconsin. The Assembly is controlled by the Republican Party, as it has been for 28 of the past 30 years (the 2009-2010 term being the sole exception).

Members of the Assembly are elected to two-year terms during the biennial fall elections. In the event of a vacancy in an Assembly seat between elections, a special election may be held to fill the position.

The Wisconsin Constitution limits the size of the State Assembly to between 54 and 100 members inclusive. Since 1973, the state has been divided into 99 Assembly districts apportioned amongst the state based on population as determined by the decennial census, for a total of 99 representatives. From 1848 to 1853 there were 66 assembly districts; from 1854 to 1856, 82 districts; from 1857 to 1861, 97 districts; and from 1862 to 1972, 100 districts. The size of the Wisconsin State Senate is tied to the size of the Assembly; it must be between one-fourth and one-third the size of the Assembly. Presently, the Senate has 33 members, with each Senate district formed by combining three neighboring Assembly districts.

The Assembly chamber is located in the west wing of the Wisconsin State Capitol building, in Madison, Wisconsin.

== History ==
The United States first organized Wisconsin in 1787 under the Northwest Ordinance after Great Britain yielded the land to them in the Treaty of Paris. It became the Wisconsin Territory in 1836. The then-territorial assembly, after elections, was seated in Burlington for three sessions before they relocated to the permanent capital, Madison.

During the period of territorial assembly, the assembled members helped to set up the court system, established the borders and number of counties, and regularized the spelling of Wisconsin. In 1842, an assemblyman (Charles Arndt, a Whig of Brown County) was shot dead by another assemblyman, James Vineyard, a Democrat of Grant County, over an appointment for Grant County sheriff.

Wisconsin became a U.S. state on May 29, 1848, and special elections were held to fill the first session of the State Assembly; at the time, the body consisted of 66 members. The Assembly was expanded to 82 seats in 1852, and then to 97 seats in 1856, then to 100 seats in 1861, which is the maximum allowed in the Constitution of Wisconsin. The membership remained at 100 seats until the 1971 redistricting act, which decreased membership to 99 in order to comply with federal equal representation requirements within the limits of the Wisconsin Constitution. The current number of 99 seats is set in order to maintain a 3:1 ratio of Assembly to Senate seats.

In the 2010s, the Assembly was heavily gerrymandered, with a 53–45% Democratic majority in the popular vote in the 2018 election translating into a 63–36 Republican majority in the Assembly. According to the Oshkosh Northwestern, many experts recognized Wisconsin as the most gerrymandered state in the United States, a claim rated "Mostly True" by Politifact. After the Republican redistricting in 2021, the Wisconsin Center for Investigative Journalism reported the efficiency gap had further increased to 16.6% in favor of Republicans.

On July 8, 2015, a case was filed with the U.S. District Court for the Western District of Wisconsin arguing that Wisconsin's 2011 state assembly map was unconstitutional partisan gerrymandering favoring the Republican-controlled legislature which discriminated against Democratic voters. This case became filed with the court as Whitford v Gill. The case made it to the United States Supreme Court, which vacated and remanded the case. The Supreme Court held that the plaintiff challenging the state assembly map did not have standing to sue. In the Opinion of the Court, Chief Justice John Roberts stated that "[a] federal court is not 'a forum for generalized grievances," and the requirement of such a personal stake 'ensures that courts exercise power that is judicial in nature." Gill v. Whitford, 128 S.Ct. 1916 (2018). We enforce that requirement by insisting that a plaintiff [have] Article III standing..." Justice Elena Kagan filed a concurring opinion, in which Justices Ruth Bader Ginsburg, Stephen Breyer, and Sonia Sotomayor joined. Justice Clarence Thomas filed an opinion concurring in part and concurring in the judgment, in which Justice Neil Gorsuch joined.

On December 22, 2023, the Wisconsin Supreme Court ruled in Clarke v. Wisconsin Elections Commission that the gerrymandered districts were unconstitutional and must be redrawn before the 2024 legislative elections.

== Salary and benefits ==
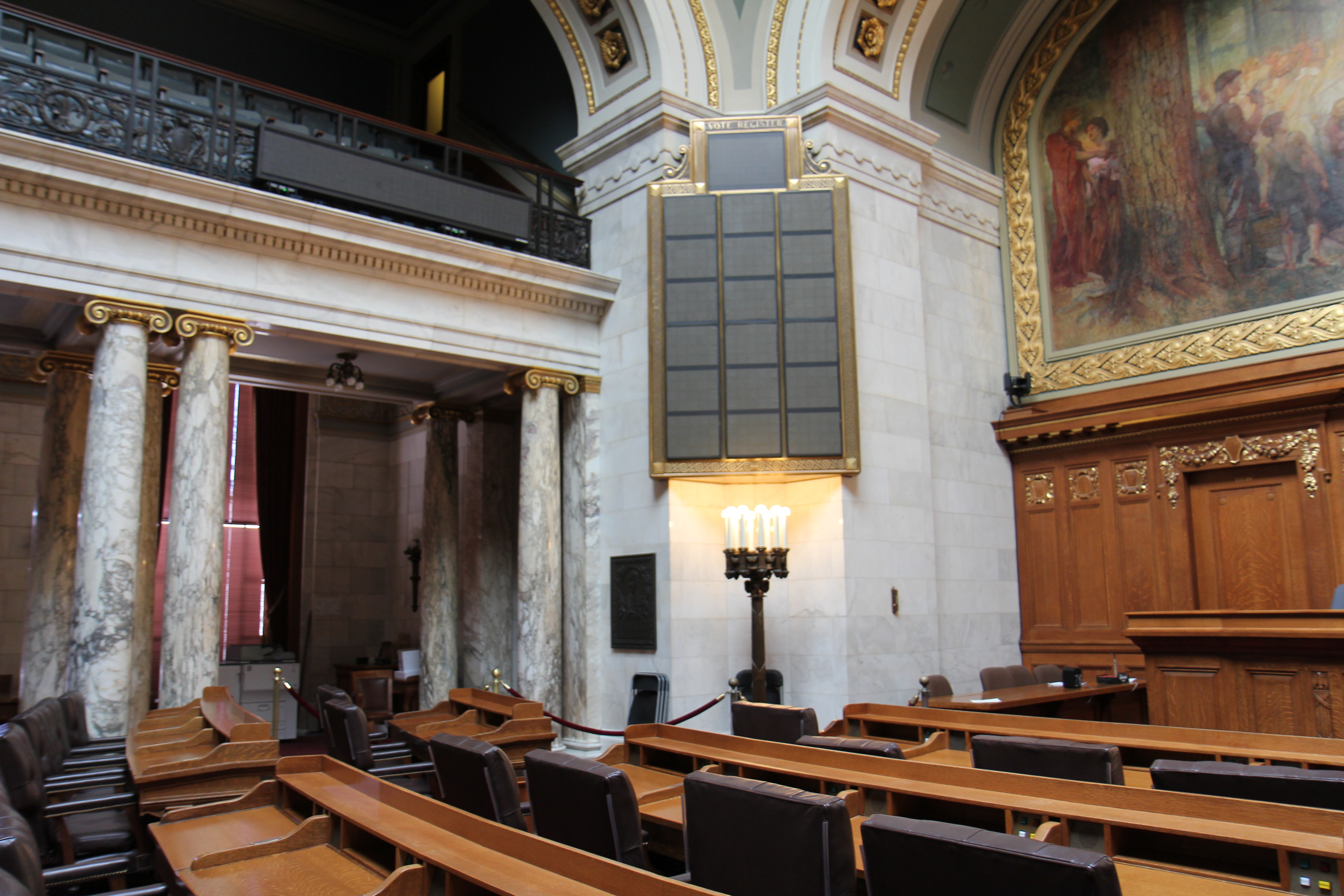
Desks and voting board

Representatives elected or re-elected in the fall of 2016 receive an annual salary of $57,408.

In addition to their salaries, representatives are allowed to claim a per diem for travel expenses. The maximum rate is set by the 2001 Wisconsin Act 16 to 90% of the U.S. General Services Administration rate, but the houses are permitted to establish additional criteria for determining per diem. The State Assembly per diem is set to $155.70 per overnight stay and $77.85 for day visits. A maximum of 153 days may be claimed for per diem in 2023, and 80 days may be claimed in 2024. Over two years, each representative is allotted $12,000 to cover general office expenses, printing, postage and district mailings.

According to a 1960 study, at that time Assembly salaries and benefits were so low that in Milwaukee County, positions on the County Board of Supervisors and the Milwaukee Common Council were considered more desirable than seats in the Assembly, and an average of 23% of Milwaukee legislators did not seek re-election. This pattern was not seen to hold to the same extent in the rest of the state, where local offices tended to pay less well.

== Current session ==
=== Composition ===
↓
45	54
Democratic	Republican

Affiliation	Party (Shading indicates majority caucus)		Total	Vacant
Affiliation	Democratic	Republican	Total	Vacant
Begin of 101st legislature (2013)	39	59	98	1
End 101st (2014)	39	60	99	0
Begin 102nd (2015)	36	63	99	0
End 102nd (2016)	36	63	99	0
Begin 103rd (2017)	35	64	99	0
End 103rd (2018)	35	64	99	0
Begin 104th (2019)	36	63	99	0
End 104th (2020)	34	62	96	3
Begin 105th (2021)	38	60	98	1
End 105th (2022)	38	57	95	4
Begin 106th (2023)	35	64	99	0
End 106th (2024)	34	64	98	1
Begin 107th (2025)	45	54	99	0
Current composition	45	54	99	0
Latest voting share	45%	55%		

Assembly districts and party affiliation after the 2024 election Republican Party Democratic Party

=== Assembly officers ===
Position	Name	Party
Speaker	Robin Vos	Republican
Speaker Pro Tempore	Kevin D. Petersen	Republican
Majority Leader	Tyler August	Republican
Assistant Majority Leader	Jon Plumer	Republican
Majority Caucus Chair	Rob Summerfield	Republican
Minority Leader	Greta Neubauer	Democratic
Assistant Minority Leader	Kalan Haywood	Democratic
Minority Caucus Chair	Lisa Subeck	Democratic
Chief Clerk	Ted Blazel	
Sergeant-at-Arms	Anne Tonnon Byers	

=== Members ===
The corresponding state senate districts are shown as a senate district is formed by nesting three assembly districts.

Senate District	Assembly District	Name	Party	Residence	Start
1	1	Joel Kitchens	Rep	Sturgeon Bay	2014
1	2	Shae Sortwell	Rep	Two Rivers	2018
1	3	Ron Tusler	Rep	Harrison	2016
2	4	David Steffen	Rep	Howard	2014
2	5	Joy Goeben	Rep	Hobart	2022
2	6	Elijah Behnke	Rep	Chase	2021
3	7	Karen Kirsch	Dem	Greenfield	2024
3	8	Sylvia Ortiz-Velez	Dem	Milwaukee	2020
3	9	Priscilla Prado	Dem	Milwaukee	2024
4	10	Darrin Madison	Dem	Milwaukee	2022
4	11	Sequanna Taylor	Dem	Milwaukee	2024
4	12	Russell Goodwin	Dem	Milwaukee	2024
5	13	Robyn Vining	Dem	Wauwatosa	2018
5	14	Angelito Tenorio	Dem	West Allis	2024
5	15	Adam Neylon	Rep	Pewaukee	2013
6	16	Kalan Haywood	Dem	Milwaukee	2018
6	17	Supreme Moore Omokunde	Dem	Milwaukee	2020
6	18	Margaret Arney	Dem	Wauwatosa	2024
7	19	Ryan Clancy	Dem	Milwaukee	2022
7	20	Christine Sinicki	Dem	Milwaukee	1998
7	21	Jessie Rodriguez	Rep	Oak Creek	2013
8	22	Paul Melotik	Rep	Grafton	2023
8	23	Deb Andraca	Dem	Whitefish Bay	2020
8	24	Dan Knodl	Rep	Germantown	2024
9	25	Paul Tittl	Rep	Manitowoc	2012
9	26	Joe Sheehan	Dem	Sheboygan	2024
9	27	Lindee Brill	Rep	Sheboygan Falls	2024
10	28	Robin Kreibich	Rep	New Richmond	2024
10	29	Treig Pronschinske	Rep	Mondovi	2016
10	30	Shannon Zimmerman	Rep	River Falls	2016
11	31	Tyler August	Rep	Walworth	2010
11	32	Amanda Nedweski	Rep	Pleasant Prairie	2022
11	33	Robin Vos	Rep	Rochester	2004
12	34	Rob Swearingen	Rep	Rhinelander	2012
12	35	Calvin Callahan	Rep	Tomahawk	2020
12	36	Jeffrey Mursau	Rep	Crivitz	2004
13	37	Mark Born	Rep	Beaver Dam	2012
13	38	William Penterman	Rep	Hustisford	2021
13	39	Alex Dallman	Rep	Markesan	2020
14	40	Karen DeSanto	Dem	Baraboo	2024
14	41	Tony Kurtz	Rep	Wonewoc	2018
14	42	Maureen McCarville	Dem	DeForest	2024
15	43	Brienne Brown	Dem	Whitewater	2024
15	44	Ann Roe	Dem	Janesville	2024
15	45	Clinton Anderson	Dem	Beloit	2022
16	46	Joan Fitzgerald	Dem	Fort Atkinson	2024
16	47	Randy Udell	Dem	Fitchburg	2024
16	48	Andrew Hysell	Dem	Sun Prairie	2024
17	49	Travis Tranel	Rep	Cuba City	2010
17	50	Jenna Jacobson	Dem	Oregon	2022
17	51	Todd Novak	Rep	Dodgeville	2014
18	52	Lee Snodgrass	Dem	Appleton	2020
18	53	Dean Kaufert	Rep	Neenah	2024
18	54	Lori Palmeri	Dem	Oshkosh	2022
19	55	Nate Gustafson	Rep	Fox Crossing	2022
19	56	Dave Murphy	Rep	Greenville	2012
19	57	Kevin David Petersen	Rep	Waupaca	2006
20	58	Rick Gundrum	Rep	Slinger	2018
20	59	Robert Brooks	Rep	Saukville	2014
20	60	Jerry L. O'Connor	Rep	Fond du Lac	2022
21	61	Bob Donovan	Rep	Greenfield	2022
21	62	Angelina Cruz	Dem	Racine	2024
21	63	Robert Wittke	Rep	Caledonia	2018
22	64	Tip McGuire	Dem	Kenosha	2019
22	65	Ben DeSmidt	Dem	Kenosha	2024
22	66	Greta Neubauer	Dem	Racine	2018
23	67	David Armstrong	Rep	Rice Lake	2020
23	68	Rob Summerfield	Rep	Bloomer	2016
23	69	Karen Hurd	Rep	Withee	2022
24	70	Nancy VanderMeer	Rep	Tomah	2014
24	71	Vinnie Miresse	Dem	Stevens Point	2024
24	72	Scott Krug	Rep	Rome	2010
25	73	Angela Stroud	Dem	Ashland	2024
25	74	Chanz Green	Rep	Grandview	2022
25	75	Duke Tucker	Rep	Grantsburg	2024
26	76	Francesca Hong	Dem	Madison	2020
26	77	Renuka Mayadev	Dem	Madison	2024
26	78	Shelia Stubbs	Dem	Madison	2018
27	79	Lisa Subeck	Dem	Madison	2014
27	80	Mike Bare	Dem	Verona	2022
27	81	Alex Joers	Dem	Westport	2022
28	82	Scott Allen	Rep	Waukesha	2014
28	83	Dave Maxey	Rep	New Berlin	2022
28	84	Chuck Wichgers	Rep	Muskego	2016
29	85	Patrick Snyder	Rep	Weston	2016
29	86	John Spiros	Rep	Marshfield	2012
29	87	Brent Jacobson	Rep	Mosinee	2024
30	88	Ben Franklin	Rep	De Pere	2024
30	89	Ryan Spaude	Dem	Ashwaubenon	2024
30	90	Amaad Rivera-Wagner	Dem	Green Bay	2024
31	91	Jodi Emerson	Dem	Eau Claire	2018
31	92	Clint Moses	Rep	Menomonie	2020
31	93	Christian Phelps	Dem	Eau Claire	2024
32	94	Steve Doyle	Dem	Onalaska	2011
32	95	Jill Billings	Dem	La Crosse	2011
32	96	Tara Johnson	Dem	Shelby	2024
33	97	Cindi Duchow	Rep	Delafield	2015
33	98	Jim Piwowarczyk	Rep	Hubertus	2024
33	99	Barbara Dittrich	Rep	Oconomowoc	2018

=== Committees ===
The following is a list of the Assembly Committees:

- Review of Administrative Rules
- Aging and Long-Term Care
- Agriculture
- Assembly Organization
- Audit
- Campaigns and Elections
- Children and Families
- Colleges and Universities
- Constitution and Ethics
- Consumer Protection
- Corrections
- Criminal Justice and Public Safety
- Education
- Employment Relations
- Energy and Utilities
- Environment
- Family Law
- Finance
- Financial Institutions
- Forestry, Parks and Outdoor Recreation
- Government Accountability, Oversight, and Transparency
- Health
- Housing and Real Estate
- Insurance
- Jobs and the Economy
- Judiciary
- Labor and Integrated Employment
- Local Government
- Mental Health
- Public Benefit Reform
- Regulatory Licensing Reform
- Rules
- Rural Development
- Science, Technology, and Broadband
- Small Business Development
- Sporting Heritage
- State Affairs
- Substance Abuse and Prevention
- Tourism
- Transportation
- Veterans and Military Affairs
- Ways and Means
- Workforce Development
- Speaker's Task Force on Racial Disparities
- Special Committee on Trade and Supply Chain
- Subcommittee on Education and Economic Development
- Subcommittee on Law Enforcement Policies and Standards

== See also ==
- Wisconsin Legislature
- Wisconsin Senate
- Impeachment in Wisconsin
