= 2024 Wisconsin State Assembly election =

- November 5, 2024

All 99 seats in the Wisconsin State Assembly 50 seats needed for a majority
- Turnout: 3,210,738
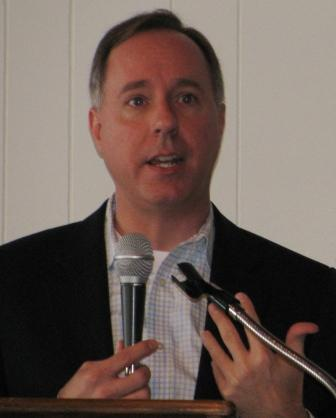

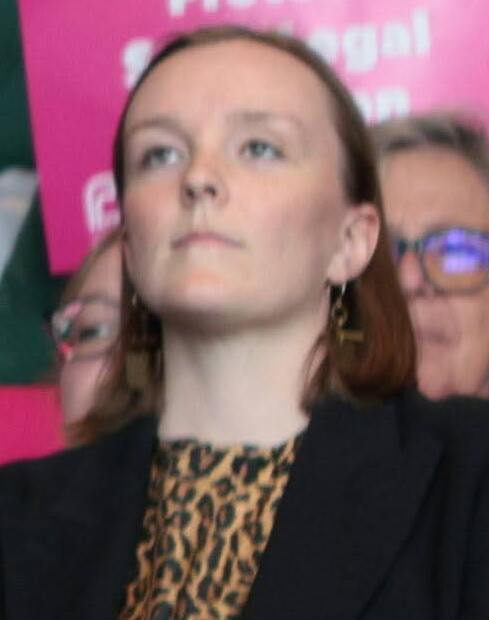
	Majority party	Minority party
Leader	Robin Vos	Greta Neubauer
Party	Republican	Democratic
Leader since	January 7, 2013	January 10, 2022
Leader's seat	33rd (Note: Redistricted from the 63rd district.)–Rochester	66th–Racine
Last election	64 seats, 53.6%	35 seats, 44.6%
Seats before	64	35
Seats won	54	45
Seat change	▼10	▲10
Popular vote	1,635,148	1,575,590
Percentage	50.51%	48.67%
Swing	▼3.09%	▲4.07%
- Republican hold Democratic hold Democratic gain 50–60% 60–70% 70–80% >90% 50–60% 60–70% 70–80% 80–90% >90%
Speaker before election
Robin Vos
Republican
Elected Speaker
Robin Vos
Republican

The 2024 Wisconsin State Assembly election was held on Tuesday, November 5, 2024, alongside elections for the State Senate. All 99 seats in the Wisconsin State Assembly were up for election. The primary election was held on August 13, 2024. The filing deadline to appear on the ballot was June 3, 2024.

Prior to the election, 64 Assembly seats were held by Republicans, 34 seats were held by Democrats, with one seat, formerly held by a Democrat, vacant. The race for chamber control was considered far more competitive in this cycle than at any point in the past decade. Following the 2023 Wisconsin Supreme Court election, the newly-seated liberal majority on the court ordered the drawing of new legislative districts. Many saw the implementation of new maps as undoing one of the most egregious gerrymanders in the entire country. Bolstered by the new competitiveness, both parties ran candidates in more Assembly seats than normal and spent heavily on the races.

Aided by the new districts, Democrats gained 10 seats from the Republicans. They failed to win a majority, but they won their largest seat share in the Assembly since before the 2010 elections. Elected members took office on January 6, 2025, with Republicans entering the 107th Wisconsin Legislature with a reduced majority of 54 out of 99 seats.

== Background ==
This election was significantly affected by the legislative maps drawn as a result of the Wisconsin Supreme Court decision in Clarke v. Wisconsin Elections Commission, which declared the previous legislative district map to be unconstitutional on December 22, 2023. The court was in the process of selecting a remedial plan, when the legislature chose to embrace the map proposed by governor Tony Evers. Evers signed the plan into law on February 19, 2024.

Under the new maps, these were expected to be the first competitive elections for the Assembly since 2010, when Republicans won control of the chamber. Democrats were expected to gain a number of seats, and while the maps were still considered slightly Republican-leaning, either major party could have won a majority of seats if they won a majority of the popular vote in the state. Over 40 incumbent representatives had been drawn into districts with one or more other incumbent, with most of them being Republicans.

Democrats last won a majority of seats in the state assembly in the 2008 elections.

=== Gerrymandering ===
In the 2010 elections, Republicans won significant majorities in both houses of the Legislature and the governorship. Republicans used their majorities to pass a radical redistricting plan after the 2010 census which substantially shifted the partisan bias of the state legislative maps. The map itself was the product of a Republican project known as REDMAP, created to maximize the partisan bias of redistricting by utilizing new statistical and mapping software. The maps were first used in the 2012 elections, which saw Democrats win 52% of the statewide vote in the Assembly, but they only won 39% of its seats going into the 2013–2015 session. This disproportionality would only grow with future elections, with Republicans consistently winning a large majority of seats while the statewide vote would remain relatively close.

During the 105th Wisconsin Legislature (2021–2023), Wisconsin was again under divided government. The Wisconsin Supreme Court re-asserted a role in arbitrating redistricting disputes for the first time in 60 years. The conservative 4–3 majority on the Court chose to take original jurisdiction over the redistricting case at the urging of state Republican leadership, breaking from prior precedent of deference to federal courts.

The Wisconsin Supreme Court ruled in November 2021, in a 4–3 decision on ideological lines, that the standard they would use to draw new maps would be to seek the "least changes" to the existing maps necessary to comply with the new census data. The standard conferred significant partisan advantage to the Republican Party in this map-making process due to the 2011 map's existing partisan tilt. After initially adopting Democratic governor Tony Evers' "least change" proposal, the United States Supreme Court tossed the decision, and the Wisconsin Supreme Court adopted the Republican "least change" proposal, instead.

=== Clarke v. Wisconsin Elections Commission ===
In 2022, Republicans won 64% of the seats, three away from a supermajority. The following April, the 2023 Wisconsin Supreme Court election flipped the majority on the Wisconsin Supreme Court to a liberal majority for the first time in over 15 years. The day after Janet Protasiewicz was inaugurated, a lawsuit was filed against the 2022 "least change" map.

The Wisconsin Supreme Court released their decision in the case, Clarke v. Wisconsin Elections Commission, on December 22, 2023, declaring the legislative maps unconstitutional in a 4–3 opinion along ideological lines. The court declared that state legislative districts must be composed of "physically adjoining territory" and pointed out that 50 of 99 existing Assembly districts failed that constitutional criteria. The majority decision also declared that the "least changes" methodology used by the court in 2022 for the Johnson v. Wisconsin Elections Commission case was never properly defined and was without legal or constitutional foundation.

The court was in the process of selecting a remedial plan when the legislature chose to pass the map proposed by governor Tony Evers. Evers signed the plan into law on February 19, 2024. Republicans showed the most favorability towards Evers' proposal due to pairing the fewest incumbents and providing Republicans with the best opportunity to retain a majority in the fall elections.

== Outgoing incumbents ==
Retiring incumbents by district Democratic incumbent ran Democratic incumbent retired Republican incumbent ran Republican incumbent retired or lost renomination Democratic and Republican incumbent ran No incumbent due to vacancy or redistricting

=== Retiring ===
- Ty Bodden (R–Stockbridge), representing district 59 since 2022, retired to avoid a primary election with Ron Tusler
- Sue Conley (D–Janesville), representing district 44 since 2020, retired.
- Dave Considine (D–Baraboo), representing district 81 since 2014, retired.
- James W. Edming (R–Glen Flora), representing district 87 since 2014, retired.
- Terry Katsma (R–Oostburg), representing district 26 since 2014, retired.
- John Macco (R–Ledgeview), representing district 88 since 2014, retired.
- Gae Magnafici (R–Dresser), representing district 28 since 2018, retired.
- Tod Ohnstad (D–Kenosha), representing district 65 since 2012, retired.
- Warren Petryk (R–Washington), representing district 93 since 2010 retired
- Jon Plumer (R–Lodi), representing district 42 since 2018, retired.
- Nik Rettinger (R–Mukwonago), representing district 83 since 2022, retired.
- Daniel Riemer (D–Milwaukee), representing district 7 since 2012, retired to spend time with his family.
- Angie Sapik (R–Lake Nebagamon), representing district 73 since 2022, retired.
- Ellen Schutt (R–Clinton), representing the 31st district since 2022, retired.
- Kristina Shelton (D–Green Bay), representing district 90 since 2020, retired.

=== Seeking other office ===
- Jimmy Anderson (D–Fitchburg), representing district 47 since 2016, retired to run for Wisconsin Senate in Wisconsin's 16th Senate district, but lost the primary.
- Samba Baldeh (D-Madison), representing district 48 since 2020, retired to run for Wisconsin Senate in Wisconsin's 16th Senate district, but lost the primary.
- Dora Drake (D–Milwaukee), representing district 11 since 2020, retired to run for Wisconsin Senate in Wisconsin's 4th Senate district to fill a vacancy. Following the uncontested special election held on July 30, 2024, she vacated her office after the regular election on December 19, 2024.
- Evan Goyke (D–Milwaukee), representing district 18 since 2012, retired to serve as Milwaukee city attorney.
- LaKeshia Myers (D–Milwaukee), representing district 12 since 2018, retired to run for Wisconsin Senate in Wisconsin's 4th Senate district to fill a vacancy–as well as for Wisconsin Senate in the same district in the general election–but lost the primaries.
- Melissa Ratcliff (D–Cottage Grove), representing district 46 since 2022, retired after being elected to Wisconsin Senate in Wisconsin's 16th Senate district.
- Katrina Shankland (D–Stevens Point), representing district 71 since 2012, retired to run for U.S. House of Representatives in Wisconsin's 3rd congressional district, but lost the primary.

=== Vacated office ===
- Marisabel Cabrera (D–Milwaukee), representing district 9 since 2018, resigned her seat on August 1 after being elected Wisconsin circuit court judge in Milwaukee County's 43rd branch in the Spring general election.

=== Lost renomination ===
- Janel Brandtjen (R–Menomonee Falls), representing district 22 since 2014, lost renomination to Dan Knodl (R–Germantown) in the 24th district.
- Donna Rozar (R–Marshfield), representing district 69 since 2020, lost renomination to fellow incumbent John Spiros (R–Marshfield) in the 86th district.
- Michael Schraa (R–Oshkosh), representing district 53 since 2012, lost renomination to fellow incumbent Nate Gustafson (R–Fox Crossing) in the 55th district
- Peter Schmidt (R–Bonduel), representing district 6 since 2022, lost renomination to fellow incumbent Elijah Behnke (R–Pensaukee)

== Recall election ==
Two recall petitions were filed with the Wisconsin Elections Commission, both against Robin Vos (R–Rochester).

=== First recall petition ===
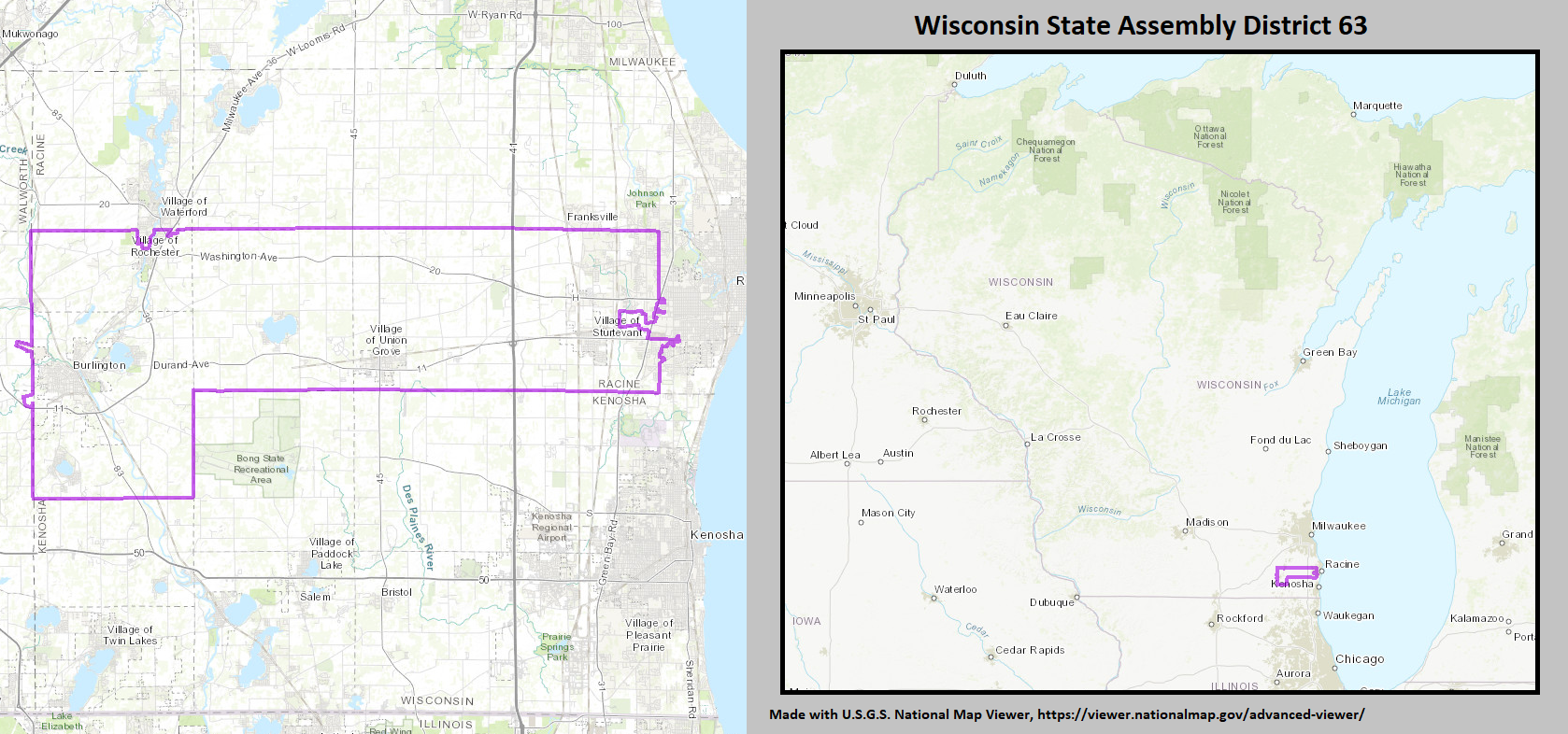
Boundaries of the old 63rd Assembly district, defined by Billie Johnson v. Wisconsin Elections Commission (2022).

In January 2024, Matthew Snorek, a resident of Burlington, filed paperwork to recall Robin Vos. In the paperwork, Snorek gave a list of grievances against Vos, which included insufficient support for former president Donald Trump, refusing to impeach Wisconsin Elections Commission administrator Megan Wolfe, and his refusal to decertify the 2020 presidential election. Many of the people who were involved in the recall campaign were the same people who were involved in the primary challenge against Vos in 2022. On March 10, the recall campaign claimed to have collected over 10,000 signatures, which would be more than enough to trigger a recall election.

The Wisconsin Supreme Court declined to answer the question of what map would be utilized for the recall election, which was in conflict due to Clarke v. Wisconsin Elections Commission. Clarke prohibited the use of the old maps in any future state legislative elections, while the law establishing the new legislative maps would not take effect until the November general election. After a review by the Wisconsin Elections Commission staff, it was found the recall organizers did not collect enough signatures within either set of boundaries to trigger a recall.

Dist.	Incumbent			Recall petition		
Dist.	Member	Party	First elected	Signatures required	Signatures approved (%)	Status
Old 63	Robin Vos	Rep.	2004	6,850	4,989 (72.8%)	Recall petition failed to acquire the required amount of signatures.
New 33	Robin Vos	Rep.	2004	7,195	3,053 (42.4%)	Recall petition failed to acquire the required amount of signatures.

=== Second recall petition ===
With the failure of the first petition to get the required amount of signatures, Snorek filed a new petition to recall Vos. He argued that Vos was a supporter of the Chinese Communist Party, had refused to help lower prescription drug costs, and derided members of the petition as "whack-jobs, morons and idiots". Wisconsin Elections Commission staff found that the recall petitioners had turned in 6,866 valid signatures, or 16 more signatures than were necessary to trigger a recall, despite the question of what district was to be used remaining unresolved. Despite the staff findings, the Commission itself rejected an additional 188 signatures, leaving the petitions without enough signatures to trigger a recall.

Dist.	Incumbent			Recall petition		
Dist.	Member	Party	First elected	Signatures required	Signatures approved (%)	Status
Old 63	Robin Vos	Rep.	2004	6,850	6,678 (97.5%)	Recall petition failed to acquire the required amount of signatures.

== Campaign ==
In December 2018, following Tony Evers' victory over incumbent governor Scott Walker, the legislature met in a joint lame-duck session and passed legislation to limit the powers of the incoming Governor and Attorney General. The move was widely described as a power grab but was upheld by the courts.

Due to the legislative gerrymander, Democrats were unable to gain a majority in the State Assembly. Beginning in 2020, Wisconsin Democrats launched the "Save the Veto initiative" as a means to preserve Governor Evers' veto power by preventing a Republican legislative supermajority. Despite this, Republicans came within three seats of a veto-proof supermajority in the Assembly in 2022. Due to the newly competitive legislative maps, Democratic campaign rhetoric shifted from protecting the governor's veto to winning a majority in the assembly.

Democrats ran over 120 candidates in 97 districts, the highest number in over a decade. This election also has the fewest uncontested districts since 1982, with 16 races–14 Democratic candidates and two Republican candidates–without a challenger.

Across the state, several major issues took shape during the campaign, including access to reproductive healthcare, funding for childcare, and affordability. During the campaign the future of Act 10 was debated, as several Democratic candidates campaigned on repealing the law, while a circuit court would partially partially strike down the law following the election in December 2024.

=== Primary elections ===
Due to redistricting, the primary featured a large number of races with multiple incumbents. 46 Assembly primaries were contested across the state, the most since 2012. Four incumbent legislators lost their primary elections, three of which were races against other incumbents. In the 24th district, election denier Janel Brandtjen, who had been endorsed by then-former president Donald Trump, was defeated by state senator and former representative to this district Dan Knodl. All incumbents with challengers from outside the legislature won their races.

During the Republican primary campaign, a PAC associated with Speaker Vos and state Republican Party leadership spent over $408,000 to support 16 candidates across the state. The PAC supported incumbent legislators facing primary challenges from more conservative opponents, and supported more moderate incumbents in incumbent-on-incumbent races. In the 19th district, democratic socialist incumbent Ryan Clancy faced a primary from moderate Jarrod Anderson, with socialist-endorsed challengers running in the 11th and 14th districts as well.

=== PFAS Legislation ===
To combat the threat of PFAS contamination, the Wisconsin legislature included $125 million in the state budget. Despite this, Republicans on the Joint Finance Committee (JFC) had refused to release the funds to be used by the Wisconsin Department of Natural Resources (DNR). On April 9, Evers vetoed a piece of legislation which would have created grants to fight pollution due to PFAS chemicals, in explaining his veto, Evers cited the restrictions the legislation would have placed on the DNR to prosecute polluters. In vetoing the legislation, Evers also continued calling for the release of the $125 million which was set aside in the budget for combatting PFAS contamination. In response to Evers' veto, JFC members said they would hold the funds hostage.

On April 16, Evers called the JFC to session, but its Republican members refused to attend, denying the committee a quorum to do business. In response to this inaction, Wisconsin Democrats launched a six-figures campaign called "No More Games" which served the purpose to pressure and target members of the Committee. Among their targets included Assembly Republicans Mark Born, Jessie Rodriguez, and Shannon Zimmerman, from the 37th, 21st, and 30th districts respectively.

=== Fundraising ===
Campaign finance reports as of November 2, 2024
Candidate	Raised	Spent	Cash on hand
Democratic Party	$29,434,168	$27,564,078	$2,056,993
Republican Party	$7,439,543	$7,197,830	$1,288,426
Source: Wisconsin Campaign Finance Information System

=== Polling ===
Poll source	Date(s) administered	Sample size (Note: Key: A – all adults RV – registered voters LV – likely voters V – unclear)	Margin of error	Democratic Party	Republican Party	Undecided
MassINC Polling Group (Note: Poll sponsored by Wisconsin Watch)	September 12–18, 2024	800 (LV)	± 3.8%	51%	44%	5%

== Predictions ==
=== Statewide ===
Source	Ranking	As of
CNalysis	Tilt R	November 4, 2024
Sabato's Crystal Ball	Leans R	October 23, 2024

== Results summary ==
Party	Candidates	Votes		Seats	
Party	Candidates	No.	%	No.	+/−
Republican Party	85	1,635,148	50.51	54	−10
Democratic Party	97	1,575,590	48.67	45	+10
Independent	6	14,515	0.45	0	0
Write-in	N/A	11,993	0.37	0	0
Total		3,237,246	100.00	99	±0
Source: Wisconsin Elections Commission

Popular vote
Republican	50.51%
Democratic	48.67%
Independent	0.45%
Write-in	0.37%

Assembly seats
Republican	54.55%
Democratic	45.45%

		Party (majority caucus shading)		Total
		Democratic	Republican	Total
Last election (2022)		35	64	99
Total after last election (2022)		35	64	99
Total before this election		35	64	99
Up for election		35	64	99
of which:	Incumbent retiring	12	12	24
of which:	Open	5	12	17
of which:	Moving districts	1	9	10
of which:	Vacated	2	0	2
of which:	Unopposed	11	2	13
This election		45	54	99
Change from last election		▲10	▼10	
Total after this election		45	54	99
Change in total		▲10	▼10	

=== Close races ===
Seats where the margin of victory was under 10%:

1. State Assembly district 94, 0.59%
2. State Assembly district 88, 0.65%
3. State Assembly district 53, 1.16%
4. State Assembly district 96, 2.0% (gain)
5. State Assembly district 43, 2.6% (gain)
6. State Assembly district 21, 2.82%
7. State Assembly district 89, 2.8% (gain)
8. State Assembly district 26, 2.92% (gain)
9. State Assembly district 61, 3.24%
10. State Assembly district 91, 3.2%
11. State Assembly district 51, 3.39% (tipping point seat)
12. State Assembly district 95, 4.01%
13. State Assembly district 46, 4.87%
14. State Assembly district 90, 5.17%
15. State Assembly district 54, 5.3%
16. State Assembly district 93, 5.56% (gain)
17. State Assembly district 71, 6.31%
18. State Assembly district 85, 6.46%
19. State Assembly district 92, 6.57%
20. State Assembly district 65, 6.72%
21. State Assembly district 66, 8.0%
22. State Assembly district 40, 8.22% (gain)
23. State Assembly district 30, 8.52%
24. State Assembly district 14, 9.23%

== Race summary ==
District	2020 Pres.	Incumbent				This race
District	2020 Pres.	Member	Party	First elected	Status	Candidates
01	R +14.6	Joel Kitchens	Republican	2014	Incumbent re-elected.	▌ ✓ Joel Kitchens (Rep.) 61.91%; ▌Renee Paplham (Dem.) 38.02%; ▌Milt Swagel (Ind. write-in) 0.01%
02	R +23.1	Shae Sortwell	Republican	2018	Incumbent re-elected.	▌ ✓ Shae Sortwell (Rep.) 63.22%; ▌Alicia Saunders (Dem.) 36.72%
02	R +23.1	John Macco (Note: Redistricted from the 88th district.)	Republican	2014	Incumbent retired. New member elected. Republican hold.	▌ ✓ Shae Sortwell (Rep.) 63.22%; ▌Alicia Saunders (Dem.) 36.72%
03	R +22.7	Ron Tusler	Republican	2016	Incumbent re-elected.	▌ ✓ Ron Tusler (Rep.) 64.47%; ▌Jason J. Schmitz (Dem.) 35.46%
03	R +22.7	Ty Bodden (Note: Redistricted from the 59th district.)	Republican	2022	Incumbent retired.	▌ ✓ Ron Tusler (Rep.) 64.47%; ▌Jason J. Schmitz (Dem.) 35.46%
04	R +27.7	David Steffen	Republican	2014	Incumbent re-elected.	▌ ✓ David Steffen (Rep.) 66.15%; ▌Jane Benson (Dem.) 33.78%
04	R +27.7	Elijah Behnke (Note: Redistricted from the 89th district.)	Republican	2021 (special)	Ran in the 6th district.	▌ ✓ David Steffen (Rep.) 66.15%; ▌Jane Benson (Dem.) 33.78%
05	R +20.3	Joy Goeben	Republican	2022	Incumbent re-elected.	▌ ✓ Joy Goeben (Rep.) 62.77%; ▌Greg Sampson (Dem.) 37.21%
06	R +31.6	Peter Schmidt	Republican	2022	Incumbent lost renomination. New member elected. Republican hold.	▌ ✓ Elijah Behnke (Rep.) 67.37%; ▌Shirley Hinze (Dem.) 32.53%
07	D +17.0	Daniel Riemer	Democratic	2012	Incumbent retired. New member elected. Democratic hold.	▌ ✓ Karen Kirsch (Dem.) 58.49%; ▌Lee Whiting (Rep.) 41.24%
07	D +17.0	Bob Donovan (Note: Redistricted from the 84th district.)	Republican	2022	Ran for the 61st district.	▌ ✓ Karen Kirsch (Dem.) 58.49%; ▌Lee Whiting (Rep.) 41.24%
08	D +57.2	Sylvia Ortiz-Velez	Democratic	2020	Incumbent re-elected.	▌ ✓ Sylvia Ortiz-Velez (Dem.) 97.97%
09	D +41.9	--Vacant (Note: Marisabel Cabrera (D) vacated her office on August 1, 2024 after being elected Wisconsin Circuit Judge)--			Previous incumbent resigned Aug. 1, 2024. New member elected. Democratic hold.	▌ ✓ Priscilla Prado (Dem.) 70.18%; ▌Ryan Antczak (Rep.) 29.51%
10	D +70.7	Darrin Madison	Democratic	2022	Incumbent re-elected.	▌ ✓ Darrin Madison (Dem.) 98.65%
11	D +76.5	Dora Drake	Democratic	2020	Ran for state senate. New member elected. Democratic hold.	▌ ✓ Sequanna Taylor (Dem.) 98.77%
12	D +57.9	LaKeshia Myers	Democratic	2018	Ran for state senate. New member elected. Democratic hold.	▌ ✓ Russell Goodwin (Dem.) 80.46%; ▌Deanna Alexander (Ind.) 18.95%
13	D +15.5	Tom Michalski	Republican	2022	Incumbent lost re-election. New member elected. Democratic gain.	▌ ✓ Robyn Vining (Dem.) 57.23%; ▌Tom Michalski (Rep.) 42.65%
13	D +15.5	Robyn Vining (Note: Redistricted from the 14th district.)	Democratic	2018	Incumbent re-elected.	▌ ✓ Robyn Vining (Dem.) 57.23%; ▌Tom Michalski (Rep.) 42.65%
14	D +9.8	None (open seat)			No incumbent. New member elected. Democratic hold.	▌ ✓ Angelito Tenorio (Dem.) 52.66%; ▌Jim Engstrand (Rep.) 43.43%; ▌Steven Shevey (Ind.) 3.76%
15	R +14.0	Adam Neylon (Note: Redistricted from the 98th district.)	Republican	2013 (special)	Incumbent re-elected.	▌ ✓ Adam Neylon (Rep.) 59.07%; ▌Sarah Harrison (Dem.) 40.82%
16	D +79.7	Kalan Haywood	Democratic	2018	Incumbent re-elected.	▌ ✓ Kalan Haywood (Dem.) 98.67%
17	D +68.4	Supreme Moore Omokunde	Democratic	2020	Incumbent re-elected.	▌ ✓ Supreme Moore Omokunde (Dem.) 98.45%
18	D +67.2	Evan Goyke	Democratic	2012	Retired to serve as Milwaukee city attorney. New member elected. Democratic hold.	▌ ✓ Margaret Arney (Dem.) 82.19%; ▌Kevin Anderson (Rep.) 17.51%
19	D +61.0	Ryan Clancy	Democratic	2022	Incumbent re-elected.	▌ ✓ Ryan Clancy (Dem.) 97.61%
20	D +18.4	Christine Sinicki	Democratic	1998	Incumbent re-elected.	▌ ✓ Christine Sinicki (Dem.) 61.01%; ▌Mike Moeller (Rep.) 38.83%
21	D +4.6	Jessie Rodriguez	Republican	2013 (special)	Incumbent re-elected.	▌ ✓ Jessie Rodriguez (Rep.) 51.27%; ▌David L. Marstellar (Dem.) 48.45%
22	R +11.1	Paul Melotik (Note: Redistricted from the 24th district.)	Republican	2023 (special)	Incumbent re-elected.	▌ ✓ Paul Melotik (Rep.) 58.00%; ▌Dana Glasstein (Dem.) 41.88%
23	D +27.3	Deb Andraca	Democratic	2020	Incumbent re-elected.	▌ ✓ Deb Andraca (Dem.) 62.57%; ▌Laurie Wolf (Rep.) 37.32%
24	R +14.9	Janel Brandtjen (Note: Redistricted from the 22nd district.)	Republican	2014	Incumbent lost renomination. New member elected. Republican hold.	▌ ✓ Dan Knodl (Rep.) 59.94%; ▌William Walter (Dem.) 39.91%
25	R +15.4	Paul Tittl	Republican	2012	Incumbent re-elected.	▌ ✓ Paul Tittl (Rep.) 61.72%; ▌Stephen R. Welch (Rep.) 38.20%
25	R +15.4	Amy Binsfeld (Note: Redistricted from the 27th district.)	Republican	2022	Ran for the 26th district.	▌ ✓ Paul Tittl (Rep.) 61.72%; ▌Stephen R. Welch (Rep.) 38.20%
26	D +3.6	None (open seat)			No incumbent. New member elected. Democratic gain.	▌ ✓ Joe Sheehan (Dem.) 51.35%; ▌Amy Binsfeld (Rep.) 48.43%
27	R +29.3	Terry Katsma (Note: Redistricted from the 26th district.)	Republican	2014	Incumbent retired. New member elected. Republican hold.	▌ ✓ Lindee Brill (Rep.) 67.66%; ▌Kay Ladson (Dem.) 32.24%
28	R +27.6	None (open seat)			No incumbent. New member elected. Republican hold.	▌ ✓ Robin Kreibich (Rep.) 66.14%; ▌Danielle Johnson (Dem.) 33.77%
29	R +23.5	Treig Pronschinske (Note: Redistricted from the 92nd district.)	Republican	2016	Incumbent re-elected.	▌ ✓ Treig Pronschinske (Rep.) 64.89%; ▌Terrance Schoonover (Dem.) 35.05%
30	R +1.1	Shannon Zimmerman	Republican	2016	Incumbent re-elected.	▌ ✓ Shannon Zimmerman (Rep.) 54.21%; ▌Alison Page (Dem.) 45.69%
31	R +19.7	Ellen Schutt	Republican	2022	Incumbent retired. New member elected. Republican hold.	▌ ✓ Tyler August (Rep.) 63.32%; ▌John Henderson (Dem.) 36.47%
32	R +28.5	Tyler August	Republican	2010	Ran for the 31st district.	▌ ✓ Amanda Nedweski (Rep.) 67.93%; ▌Michael Dhindsa (Dem.) 31.95%
32	R +28.5	Amanda Nedweski (Note: Redistricted from the 61st district.)	Republican	2022	Incumbent re-elected.	▌ ✓ Amanda Nedweski (Rep.) 67.93%; ▌Michael Dhindsa (Dem.) 31.95%
33	R +27.9	Robin Vos (Note: Redistricted from the 63rd district.)	Republican	2004	Incumbent re-elected.	▌ ✓ Robin Vos (Rep.) 56.97%; ▌Alan Kupsik (Dem.) 29.76%; ▌Kelly Clark (Ind.) 13.14%
34	R +17.5	Rob Swearingen	Republican	2012	Incumbent re-elected.	▌ ✓ Rob Swearingen (Rep.) 64.06%; ▌Dennis Nitzel (Dem.) 35.88%
35	R +28.7	Calvin Callahan	Republican	2020	Incumbent re-elected.	▌ ✓ Calvin Callahan (Rep.) 67.73%; ▌Elizabeth McCrank (Dem.) 32.22%
36	R +35.1	Jeffrey Mursau	Republican	2004	Incumbent re-elected.	▌ ✓ Jeffrey Mursau (Rep.) 70.77%; ▌Benjamin Murray (Dem.) 28.93%
37	R +26.1	Mark Born (Note: Redistricted from the 39th district.)	Republican	2012	Incumbent re-elected.	▌ ✓ Mark Born (Rep.) 68.58%; ▌LaToya Bates (Dem.) 31.41%
38	R +28.7	None (open seat)			No incumbent. New member elected. Republican hold.	▌ ✓ William Penterman (Rep.) 67.27%; ▌Izzy Nevarez (Dem.) 32.61%
39	R +31.7	Alex Dallman (Note: Redistricted from the 41st district.)	Republican	2020	Incumbent re-elected.	▌ ✓ Alex Dallman (Rep.) 69.53%; ▌Chris Gordon (Dem.) 30.39%
40	D +7.8	Dave Considine (Note: Redistricted from the 81st district.)	Democratic	2014	Incumbent retired. New member elected. Democratic gain.	▌ ✓ Karen DeSanto (Dem.) 54.09%; ▌Gerald Helmer (Rep.) 45.87%
41	R +14.1	Tony Kurtz (Note: Redistricted from the 50th district.)	Republican	2018	Incumbent re-elected.	▌ ✓ Tony Kurtz (Rep.) 63.08%; ▌Julia Henley (Dem.) 36.84%
42	D +16.1	Jon Plumer	Republican	2018 (special)	Incumbent retired. New member elected. Democratic gain.	▌ ✓ Maureen McCarville (Dem.) 55.01%; ▌Rebecca Witherspoon (Rep.) 44.89%
42	D +16.1	William Penterman (Note: Redistricted from the 37th district.)	Republican	2021 (special)	Ran for the 38th district.	▌ ✓ Maureen McCarville (Dem.) 55.01%; ▌Rebecca Witherspoon (Rep.) 44.89%
43	D +9.5	None (open seat)			No incumbent. New member elected. Democratic hold.	▌ ✓ Brienne Brown (Dem.) 51.24%; ▌Scott Johnson (Rep.) 48.64%
44	D +14.5	Sue Conley	Democratic	2020	Incumbent retired. New member elected. Democratic hold.	▌ ✓ Ann Roe (Dem.) 56.39%; ▌Bruce Danielson (Rep.) 43.49%
45	D +11.2	Clinton Anderson	Democratic	2022	Incumbent re-elected.	▌ ✓ Clinton Anderson (Dem.) 95.87%
46	D +9.0	Melissa Ratcliff	Democratic	2022	Ran for state senate. New member elected. Democratic hold.	▌ ✓ Joan Fitzgerald (Dem.) 52.39%; ▌Jennifer Quimby (Rep.) 47.52%
47	D +43.9	Jimmy P. Anderson	Democratic	2016	Ran for state senate. New member elected. Democratic hold.	▌ ✓ Randy Udell (Dem.) 98.18%
48	D +36.3	Samba Baldeh	Democratic	2020	Ran for state senate. New member elected. Democratic hold.	▌ ✓ Andrew Hysell (Dem.) 67.32%; ▌Lisa Rubrich (Rep.) 32.53%
49	R +11.5	Travis Tranel	Republican	2010	Incumbent re-elected.	▌ ✓ Travis Tranel (Rep.) 62.99%; ▌Scott Walker (Dem.) 36.92%
50	D +16.1	Jenna Jacobson (Note: Redistricted from the 43rd district.)	Democratic	2022	Incumbent re-elected. Democratic gain.	▌ ✓ Jenna Jacobson (Dem.) 56.27%; ▌Richard Johnson (Rep.) 43.66%
51	D +8.4	Todd Novak	Republican	2014	Incumbent re-elected.	▌ ✓ Todd Novak (Rep.) 51.66%; ▌Elizabeth Grabe (Dem.) 48.27%
52	D +12.5	Lee Snodgrass (Note: Redistricted from the 57th district.)	Democratic	2020	Incumbent re-elected.	▌ ✓ Lee Snodgrass (Dem.) 57.25%; ▌Chad Cooke (Rep.) 42.75%
53	D +4.3	None (open seat)			No incumbent. New member elected. Republican hold.	▌ ✓ Dean Kaufert (Rep.) 50.51%; ▌Duane Shukoski (Dem.) 49.35%
54	D +8.6	Lori Palmeri	Democratic	2022	Incumbent re-elected.	▌ ✓ Lori Palmeri (Dem.) 57.23%; ▌Tim Paterson (Rep.) 47.27%
55	R +16.5	Nate Gustafson	Republican	2022	Incumbent re-elected.	▌ ✓ Nate Gustafson (Rep.) 60.37%; ▌Kyle Kehoe (Dem.) 39.53%
55	R +16.5	Michael Schraa (Note: Redistricted from the 53rd district.)	Republican	2012	Incumbent lost renomination.	▌ ✓ Nate Gustafson (Rep.) 60.37%; ▌Kyle Kehoe (Dem.) 39.53%
56	R +26.8	Dave Murphy	Republican	2012	Incumbent re-elected.	▌ ✓ Dave Murphy (Rep.) 64.74%; ▌Emily Tseffos (Dem.) 35.24%
57	R +32.8	Kevin David Petersen (Note: Redistricted from the 40th district.)	Republican	2006	Incumbent re-elected.	▌ ✓ Kevin David Petersen (Rep.) 68.64%; ▌Ruth Caves (Dem.) 31.29%; ▌Dylan Testin (Ind.) 10.15%
58	R +38.6	Rick Gundrum	Republican	2018 (special)	Incumbent re-elected.	▌ ✓ Rick Gundrum (Rep.) 71.26%; ▌Deb Anderson (Dem.) 28.63%
59	R +48.1	Robert Brooks (Note: Redistricted from the 60th district.)	Republican	2014	Incumbent re-elected.	▌ ✓ Robert Brooks (Rep.) 75.71%; ▌Jack Holzman (Dem.) 24.20%
60	R +12.6	Jerry L. O'Connor (Note: Redistricted from the 52nd district.)	Republican	2022	Incumbent re-elected.	▌ ✓ Jerry L. O'Connor (Rep.) 60.11%; ▌Joe Lavrenz (Dem.) 39.84%
61	D +1.9	None (open seat)			No incumbent. New member elected. Republican hold.	▌ ✓ Bob Donovan (Rep.) 51.54%; ▌LuAnn Bird (Dem.) 48.30%
62	D +24.8	Robert Wittke	Republican	2018	Ran for the 63rd district. New member elected. Democratic gain.	▌ ✓ Angelina Cruz (Dem.) 95.24%
63	R +13.6	None (open seat)			No incumbent. New member elected. Republican hold.	▌ ✓ Robert Wittke (Rep.) 96.80%
64	D +10.1	Tip McGuire	Democratic	2019 (special)	Incumbent re-elected.	▌ ✓ Tip McGuire (Dem.) 55.59%; ▌Edward Hibsch (Rep.) 44.21%
65	D +9.3	Tod Ohnstad	Democratic	2012	Incumbent retired. New member elected. Democratic hold.	▌ ✓ Ben DeSmidt (Dem.) 53.27%; ▌Brian Gonzales (Rep.) 46.55%
66	D +11.5	Greta Neubauer	Democratic	2018 (special)	Incumbent re-elected.	▌ ✓ Greta Neubauer (Dem.) 53.89%; ▌David DeGroot (Rep.) 45.89%
67	R +26.2	David Armstrong (Note: Redistricted from the 75th district.)	Republican	2020	Incumbent re-elected.	▌ ✓ David Armstrong (Rep.) 67.63%; ▌Jeffrey Foster (Dem.) 32.34%
68	R +34.9	James W. Edming (Note: Redistricted from the 87th district.)	Republican	2014	Incumbent retired.	▌ ✓ Rob Summerfield (Rep.) 72.81%; ▌Richard Pulcher (Dem.) 27.13%
68	R +34.9	Rob Summerfield (Note: Redistricted from the 67th district.)	Republican	2016	Incumbent re-elected.	▌ ✓ Rob Summerfield (Rep.) 72.81%; ▌Richard Pulcher (Dem.) 27.13%
69	R +39.7	None (open seat)			No incumbent. New member elected. Republican hold.	▌ ✓ Karen Hurd (Rep.) 71.89%; ▌Roger Halls (Dem.) 24.16%; ▌Joshua Kelley (Ind.) 3.89%
70	R +22.6	Nancy VanderMeer	Republican	2014	Incumbent re-elected.	▌ ✓ Nancy VanderMeer (Rep.) 66.73%; ▌Remberto Gomez (Dem.) 33.21%
71	D +7.9	Katrina Shankland	Democratic	2012	Ran for U.S. House; New member elected. Democratic hold.	▌ ✓ Vinnie Miresse (Dem.) 53.13%; ▌Robert Pahmeier (Rep.) 46.82%
72	R +21.5	Scott Krug	Republican	2010	Incumbent re-elected.	▌ ✓ Scott Krug (Rep.) 63.89%; ▌Suzanne M. Campbell (Dem.) 36.05%
73	D +18.5	Angie Sapik	Republican	2022	Incumbent retired. New member elected. Democratic gain.	▌ ✓ Angela Stroud (Dem.) 58.32%; ▌Frank Kostka (Rep.) 41.53%
74	R +17.3	Chanz Green	Republican	2022	Incumbent re-elected.	▌ ✓ Chanz Green (Rep.) 62.44%; ▌Jeanne Bruce (Dem.) 37.50%
75	R +28.1	Gae Magnafici (Note: Redistricted from the 28th district.)	Republican	2018	Incumbent retired. New member elected. Republican hold.	▌ ✓ Duke Tucker (Rep.) 66.71%; ▌Jane Kleiss (Dem.) 33.29%
76	D +80.3	Francesca Hong	Democratic	2020	Incumbent re-elected.	▌ ✓ Francesca Hong (Dem.) 98.85%
77	D +73.7	None (open seat)			No incumbent. New member elected. Democratic hold.	▌ ✓ Renuka Mayadev (Dem.) 98.35%
78	D +61.2	Shelia Stubbs (Note: Redistricted from the 77th district.)	Democratic	2018	Incumbent re-elected.	▌ ✓ Shelia Stubbs (Dem.) 98.15%
79	D +71.5	Lisa Subeck (Note: Redistricted from the 78th district.)	Democratic	2014	Incumbent re-elected.	▌ ✓ Lisa Subeck (Dem.) 98.60%
80	D +48.0	Mike Bare	Democratic	2022	Incumbent re-elected.	▌ ✓ Mike Bare (Dem.) 73.42%; ▌Robert Relph (Rep.) 26.49%
80	D +48.0	Alex Joers (Note: Redistricted from the 79th district.)	Democratic	2022	Ran for the 81st district.	▌ ✓ Mike Bare (Dem.) 73.42%; ▌Robert Relph (Rep.) 26.49%
81	D +38.7	None (open seat)			No incumbent. New member elected. Democratic hold.	▌ ✓ Alex Joers (Dem.) 97.74%
82	R +7.9	Scott Allen (Note: Redistricted from the 97th district.)	Republican	2014	Incumbent re-elected.	▌ ✓ Scott Allen (Rep.) 57.18%; ▌Kevin Reilly (Dem.) 42.71%
83	R +17.8	Dave Maxey (Note: Redistricted from the 15th district.)	Republican	2022	Incumbent re-elected.	▌ ✓ Dave Maxey (Rep.) 60.92%; ▌Jill Schindler (Dem.) 38.94%
84	R +38.5	Nik Rettinger (Note: Redistricted from the 83rd district.)	Republican	2022	Incumbent retired.	▌ ✓ Chuck Wichgers (Rep.) 71.88%; ▌Zachary Roper (Dem.) 28.01%
84	R +38.5	Chuck Wichgers (Note: Redistricted from the 82nd district.)	Republican	2016	Incumbent re-elected.	▌ ✓ Chuck Wichgers (Rep.) 71.88%; ▌Zachary Roper (Dem.) 28.01%
85	R +0.5	None (open seat)			Incumbent re-elected.	▌ ✓ Patrick Snyder (Rep.) 53.17%; ▌Yee Leng Xiong (Dem.) 46.71%
86	R +26.7	John Spiros	Republican	2012	Incumbent re-elected.	▌ ✓ John Spiros (Rep.) 66.90%; ▌John H. Small (Dem.) 33.01%
86	R +26.7	Donna Rozar (Note: Redistricted from the 69th district.)	Republican	2020	Lost renomination.	▌ ✓ John Spiros (Rep.) 66.90%; ▌John H. Small (Dem.) 33.01%
87	R +24.8	Patrick Snyder (Note: Redistricted from the 85th district.)	Republican	2016	Ran for the 85th district. New member elected. Republican hold.	▌ ✓ Brent Jacobson (Rep.) 66.00%; ▌William Switalla (Dem.) 33.91%
88	R +0.7	None (open seat)			No incumbent. New member elected. Republican hold.	▌ ✓ Ben Franklin (Rep.) 50.29%; ▌Christy Welch (Dem.) 49.64%
89	D +0.8	None (open seat)			No incumbent. New member elected. Democratic gain.	▌ ✓ Ryan Spaude (Dem.) 51.32%; ▌Patrick J. Buckley (Rep.) 48.52%
90	D +11.7	Kristina Shelton	Democratic	2020	Incumbent retired. New member elected. Democratic hold.	▌ ✓ Amaad Rivera-Wagner (Dem.) 52.53%; ▌Jessica Henderson (Rep.) 47.36%
91	D +5.9	Jodi Emerson	Democratic	2018	Incumbent re-elected.	▌ ✓ Jodi Emerson (Dem.) 51.52%; ▌Michele Skinner (Rep.) 48.32%
91	D +5.9	Karen Hurd (Note: Redistricted from the 68th district.)	Republican	2022	Ran for the 69th district.	▌ ✓ Jodi Emerson (Dem.) 51.52%; ▌Michele Skinner (Rep.) 48.32%
92	R +4.8	Clint Moses (Note: Redistricted from the 29th district.)	Republican	2020	Incumbent re-elected.	▌ ✓ Clint Moses (Rep.) 53.25%; ▌Joe Plouff (Dem.) 46.68%
93	D +8.3	Warren Petryk	Republican	2010	Incumbent retired. New member elected. Democratic gain.	▌ ✓ Christian Phelps (Dem.) 52.72%; ▌James Rolbiecki (Rep.) 47.16%
94	D +0.03	Steve Doyle	Democratic	2011 (special)	Incumbent re-elected.	▌ ✓ Steve Doyle (Dem.) 50.29%; ▌Ryan Huebsch (Rep.) 49.70%
95	D +8.4	Jill Billings	Democratic	2011 (special)	Incumbent re-elected.	▌ ✓ Jill Billings (Dem.) 51.99%; ▌Cedric Schnitzler (Rep.) 47.98%
96	D +10.9	Loren Oldenburg	Republican	2018	Incumbent lost re-election. New member elected. Democratic gain.	▌ ✓ Tara Johnson (Dem.) 50.97%; ▌Loren Oldenburg (Rep.) 48.97%
97	R +33.7	Cindi Duchow (Note: Redistricted from the 99th district.)	Republican	2015 (special)	Incumbent re-elected.	▌ ✓ Cindi Duchow (Rep.) 70.94%; ▌Beth Leonard (Dem.) 28.94%
97	R +33.7	Scott Johnson (Note: Redistricted from the 33rd district.)	Republican	2022	Ran for the 43rd district.	▌ ✓ Cindi Duchow (Rep.) 70.94%; ▌Beth Leonard (Dem.) 28.94%
98	R +36.7	None (open seat)			No incumbent. New member elected. Republican hold.	▌ ✓ Jim Piwowarczyk (Rep.) 71.08%; ▌Del Schmechel (Dem.) 28.85%
99	R +32.5	Barbara Dittrich (Note: Redistricted from the 38th district.)	Republican	2018	Incumbent re-elected.	▌ ✓ Barbara Dittrich (Rep.) 97.48%

== Detailed results ==
=== District 1 ===
Incumbent Republican Joel Kitchens ran for re-election. Kitchens faced one opponent in the Republican primary, Milt Swagel, a former Kewaunee County Board supervisor and candidate for this district in 2022. During the campaign, Swagel campaigned to the right of Kitchens and attempted to paint his opponent as insufficiently conservative and as part of the establishment. Kitchens defeated Swagel in the primary election. He went on to defeat Democrat Renee Paplham in the general election by 24 points. Swagel, who had been defeated in the primary, waged a write-in campaign in the general but only gained 5 votes.

District 1 Republican primary
Party	Candidate	Votes	%
Republican	Joel Kitchens (incumbent)	7,858	77.15
Republican	Milt Swagel	2,319	22.76
Write-in		9	0.09
Total votes		10,186	100.0

District 1 general election
Party	Candidate	Votes	%
Republican	Joel Kitchens (incumbent)	24,101	61.91
Democratic	Renee Paplham	14,801	38.02
Independent	Milt Swagel (write-in)	5	0.01
Write-in		22	0.06
Total votes		38,929	100.0
Republican hold			

=== District 2 ===
Incumbent Republican Shae Sortwell ran for re-election. In the general election he defeated Democrat Alicia Saunders, a former navy officer.

District 2 general election
Party	Candidate	Votes	%
Republican	Shae Sortwell (incumbent)	23,198	63.22
Democratic	Alicia Saunders	13,474	36.72
Write-in		21	0.06
Total votes		36,693	100.0
Republican hold			

=== District 3 ===
Incumbent Republican Ron Tusler ran for re-election. He defeated Democrat and electrician Jason Schmitz in the general election.

District 3 general election
Party	Candidate	Votes	%
Republican	Ron Tusler (incumbent)	23,343	64.47
Democratic	Jason J. Schmitz	12,839	35.46
Write-in		28	0.07
Total votes		36,211	100.0
Republican hold			

=== District 4 ===
Incumbent Republican David Steffen ran for re-election. Due to redistricting Elijah Behnke was placed into this district but decided to run in the 6th district. Instead, Steffen faced Darwin Behnke, vice chair of the Oconto County Republican Party and father of Elijah. Behnke justified his bid in alleging that Steffen was insufficiently conservative and a "RINO" and argued that he did not want to see Steffen run unopposed in the primary. Steffen defeated Behnke by 33 points and defeated Democrat Jane Benson in the general election.

In the Democratic primary two candidates announced campaigns to take on Steffen, Jane Benson, the nominee for the 89th district in 2022 and fellow Suamico resident Alexia Unertl. In the primary both candidates held similar views to each other, differing primarily in their backgrounds and political history, with Benson running for state assembly in the past and organizing for the League of Women Voters and Unertl serving as the vice chair for the Brown County Conservation Congress. In the primary, Benson defeated Unertl by 57 points and was defeated by David Steffen in the general election.

Precinct results: Steffen—50–60% Steffen—60–70% Steffen—70–80% Steffen—80–90% Behnke—50–60% Behnke—50–60%

District 4 Republican primary
Party	Candidate	Votes	%
Republican	David Steffen (incumbent)	6,099	66.59
Republican	Darwin Behnke	3,040	33.2
Write-in		19	0.21
Total votes		9,158	100.0

District 4 Democratic primary
Party	Candidate	Votes	%
Democratic	Jane Benson	3,521	78.58
Democratic	Alexia Unertl	958	21.38
Write-in		2	0.04
Total votes		4,481	100.0

District 4 general election
Party	Candidate	Votes	%
Republican	David Steffen (incumbent)	24,629	66.15
Democratic	Jane Benson	12,579	33.78
Write-in		26	0.07
Total votes		37,234	100.0
Republican hold			

=== District 5 ===
Incumbent Republican Joy Goeben ran for re-election. In the general election she defeated Democrat Greg Sampson.

District 5 general election
Party	Candidate	Votes	%
Republican	Joy Goeben (incumbent)	22,041	62.77
Democratic	Greg Sampson	13,063	37.21
Write-in		6	0.02
Total votes		35,110	100.0
Republican hold			

=== District 6 ===
Incumbent Republican Peter Schmidt ran for re-election. Previously Schmidt had been subject to controversy due to being censured by the Shawano County GOP and being criminally convicted for abuse of a migrant worker on his farm, and was seen as vulnerable to a primary challenge. Elijah Behnke had been previously drawn into the 4th Assembly district due to redistricting but decided to run in the 6th against Schmidt. Behnke defeated Schmidt by a 17 point margin in the primary and defeated Democrat Shirley Hinze in the general election.

Precinct results: Behnke—50–60% Behnke—60–70% Behnke—100% Schmidt—50–60% Tie—40% No votes

District 6 Republican primary
Party	Candidate	Votes	%
Republican	Elijah Behnke	5,054	58.58
Republican	Peter Schmidt (incumbent)	3,565	41.32
Write-in		8	0.1
Total votes		8,627	100.0

District 6 general election
Party	Candidate	Votes	%
Republican	Elijah Behnke	21,941	67.37
Democratic	Shirley Hinze	10,591	32.53
Write-in		32	0.10
Total votes		32,531	100.0
Republican hold			

=== District 7 ===
Precinct results: Kirsch—50–60% Kirsch—60–70% Kirsch—70–80% Whiting—50–60% Whiting—60–70%

Incumbent Democrat Daniel Riemer declined to seek re-election, leaving this district open. Instead of seeking re-election in this district, fellow incumbent Republican Bob Donovan ran in the 61st district after redistricting placed his residence in the 7th. Democrat Karen Kirsch defeated perennial candidate and Republican Lee Whiting in the general election.

District 7 general election
Party	Candidate	Votes	%
Democratic	Karen Kirsch	16,014	58.49
Republican	Lee Whiting	11,289	41.24
Write-in		74	0.27
Total votes		27,377	100.0
Democratic hold			

=== District 8 ===
Incumbent Democrat Sylvia Ortiz-Velez ran for re-election unopposed. In the primary she defeated 2020 candidate for this district Enrique Murguia by a 62-point margin.

District 8 Democratic primary
Party	Candidate	Votes	%
Democratic	Sylvia Ortiz-Velez (incumbent)	1,430	80.61
Democratic	Enrique Murguia	336	18.94
Write-in		8	0.45
Total votes		1,774	100.0

District 8 general election
Party	Candidate	Votes	%
Democratic	Sylvia Ortiz-Velez (incumbent)	10,987	97.97
Write-in		228	2.03
Total votes		11,215	100.0
Democratic hold			

=== District 9 ===
Incumbent Democrat Marisabel Cabrera resigned on August 1 after being elected to the Wisconsin Circuit Court in the Spring general election, leaving this district open. Two Democrats ran to succeed Cabrera, Priscilla Prado, a business owner and treasurer for the Wisconsin Latino Chamber of Commerce, and Deisy España, a student at Milwaukee Area Technical College and organizer for Voces de la Frontera. Both candidates are Hispanic. During the campaign España positioned herself as the progressive candidate, calling for expansions to BadgerCare, strengthening public schools, and restoring workers' rights, among other positions, while Prado focused on public safety, affordable housing and access to healthcare, and police reform. Prado defeated España by a 39 point margin and went on to defeat Republican Ryan Antczak, a corrections officer, in the general election.

District 9 Democratic primary
Party	Candidate	Votes	%
Democratic	Priscilla Prado	2,000	69.01
Democratic	Deisy España	880	30.37
Write-in		18	0.62
Total votes		2,898	100.0

District 9 general election
Party	Candidate	Votes	%
Democratic	Priscilla Prado	12,449	70.18
Republican	Ryan Antczak	5,234	29.51
Write-in		54	0.30
Total votes		17,737	100.0
Democratic hold			

=== District 10 ===
Incumbent Democrat Darrin Madison ran for re-election unopposed.

District 10 general election
Party	Candidate	Votes	%
Democratic	Darrin Madison (incumbent)	24,882	98.65
Write-in		340	1.35
Total votes		25,222	100.0
Democratic hold			

=== District 11 ===
Incumbent Democrat Dora Drake won a special election to the 4th Senate district to succeed Lena Taylor, leaving this district open. In the primary, Milwaukee County supervisor Sequanna Taylor defeated University of Wisconsin–Milwaukee student Amillia Heredia. Taylor was unopposed in the general election.

District 11 Democratic primary
Party	Candidate	Votes	%
Democratic	Sequanna Taylor	3,927	83.25
Democratic	Amillia Heredia	774	16.41
Write-in		16	0.34
Total votes		4,717	100.0

District 11 general election
Party	Candidate	Votes	%
Democratic	Sequanna Taylor	20,392	98.77
Write-in		254	1.23
Total votes		20,646	100.0
Democratic hold			

=== District 12 ===
Results by precinct: Goodwin—30–40% Goodwin—40–50% Williford—30–40% Williford—40–50% Morrison—30–40% Morrison—40–50% Goodwin–Morrison tie—35.82%

Incumbent Democrat LaKeshia Myers declined to seek re-election, instead making an unsuccessful run for Wisconsin Senate in the 4th district, leaving this district open. In the primary, former Milwaukee County supervisor Russell Goodwin Sr. faced off against UW-Madison law school student and first-time candidate Katrina Morrison, and community organizer Brandon Williford. In the campaign, the three candidates offered broadly similar platforms, but differed on certain key issues. On abortion, Goodwin and Morrison declined to support eliminating the ban on abortion in Wisconsin, while Williford supported eliminating the ban. Another major issue was trans women in sports, with Goodwin supporting the issue being put to a referendum, while Morrison opposed any ban on trans women in sports. Additionally, Morrison was endorsed by then-incumbent legislators Alex Joers and LaKeshia Myers, while Williford was endorsed by various progressive groups, as well as Democratic legislator Ryan Clancy and Senator Chris Larson. A fourth candidate initially ran for the nomination, Decorah Gordon, but later withdrew and endorsed Williford. Goodwin won the crowded primary with under one third of the vote. In the general election, Goodwin defeated Independent and fellow Milwaukee County supervisor Deanna Alexander by a wide margin.

District 12 Democratic primary
Party	Candidate	Votes	%
Democratic	Russell Antonio Goodwin Sr.	1,705	32.66
Democratic	Brandon Williford	1,529	29.29
Democratic	Katrina Blossom Morrison	1,395	26.72
Democratic	Decorah Gordon (withdrawn)	573	10.97
Write-in		19	0.36
Total votes		5,221	100.0

District 12 general election
Party	Candidate	Votes	%
Democratic	Russell Goodwin Sr.	18,391	80.46
Independent	Deanna Alexander	4,331	18.95
Write-in		134	0.59
Total votes		22,856	100.0
Democratic hold			

=== District 13 ===
Incumbent Republican Tom Michalski ran for re-election. In the primary, Michalski faced Patti Granger, a single mother who campaigned as a moderate conservative. Michalski defeated Granger by a wide margin. The 13th district, alongside the neighboring 14th district, were drawn in 2011 to give Republicans two elected representatives. But over time the Milwaukee suburbs have become more liberal due to the election of Donald Trump in 2016. In 2020, Democrats won the two districts, but the 13th district was redrawn in 2022 to return it to the Republican Party, and in the 2024 redistricting, the 13th district gained a Democratic lean. In the general election Michalski was defeated by Democrat and fellow legislator Robyn Vining after she was moved from the neighboring 14th district into the 13th due to redistricting.

District 13 Republican primary
Party	Candidate	Votes	%
Republican	Tom Michalski (incumbent)	5,218	79.45
Republican	Patti Granger	1,338	20.37
Write-in		12	0.18
Total votes		6,568	100.0

Precinct results: Vining—50–60% Vining—60–70% Vining—70–80% Michalski—50–60% No votes

District 13 general election
Party	Candidate	Votes	%
Democratic	Robyn Vining (incumbent)	22,540	57.23
Republican	Tom Michalski (incumbent)	16,796	42.65
Write-in		48	0.12
Total votes		39,384	100.0
Democratic gain from Republican			

=== District 14 ===
Results by precinct: Tenorio—30–40% Tenorio—40–50% Tenorio—50–60% Kieso—30–40% Kieso—40–50%

Incumbent Democrat Robyn Vining was moved into the neighboring 13th district due to redistricting, leaving this district open. In the primary, Angelito Tenorio, a candidate for State Treasurer in 2022 and former West Allis alderman, defeated business owner Brady Coulthard and social worker Nathan Kieso. Tenorio defeated Republican Jim Engstrand and Independent perennial candidate Steven Shevey in the general election.

District 14 Democratic primary
Party	Candidate	Votes	%
Democratic	Angelito Tenorio	2,220	37.20
Democratic	Nathan Kieso	2,006	33.62
Democratic	Brady Coulthard	1,731	29.01
Write-in		10	0.17
Total votes		5,967	100.0

Results by precinct: Tenorio—40–50% Tenorio—50–60% Tenorio—60–70% Engstrand—40–50% Engstrand—50–60%

District 14 general election
Party	Candidate	Votes	%
Democratic	Angelito Tenorio	15,637	52.66
Republican	Jim Engstrand	12,896	43.43
Independent	Steven Shevey	1,117	3.76
Write-in		43	0.14
Total votes		29,693	100.0
Democratic hold			

=== District 15 ===
Incumbent Republican Dave Maxey was moved into the 83rd district due to redistricting. Fellow Republican Adam Neylon ran for re-election after being moved into this district due to redistricting. In the general election he defeated Democrat Sarah Harrison.

Results by precinct: Neylon—50–60% Neylon—60–70% Harrison—80–90%

District 15 general election
Party	Candidate	Votes	%
Republican	Adam Neylon	22,573	59.07
Democratic	Sarah Harrison	15,598	40.82
Write-in		44	0.11
Total votes		38,170	100.0
Republican hold			

=== District 16 ===
Incumbent Democrat Kalan Haywood ran for re-election unopposed.

District 16 general election
Party	Candidate	Votes	%
Democratic	Kalan Haywood (incumbent)	20,079	98.67
Write-in		271	1.33
Total votes		20,350	100.0
Democratic hold			

=== District 17 ===
Incumbent Democrat Supreme Moore Omokunde ran for re-election unopposed.

District 17 general election
Party	Candidate	Votes	%
Democratic	Supreme Moore Omokunde (incumbent)	24,469	98.45
Write-in		385	1.55
Total votes		24,854	100.0
Democratic hold			

=== District 18 ===
Incumbent Democrat Evan Goyke declined to seek re-election after being elected Milwaukee city attorney in the 2024 spring election, leaving this district open.In the primary, Wauwatosa Common Councilmember Margaret Arney faced perennial candidate Angela Kennedy. During her campaign, Arney supported removing restrictions on unions and increasing access to abortion, and was endorsed by Goyke as well as other Milwaukee-area Democrats such as congresswoman Gwen Moore. She defeated Kennedy by a 30-point margin. Arney then defeated Republican Kevin Andre Anderson in the general election by a wide margin.

District 18 Democratic primary
Party	Candidate	Votes	%
Democratic	Margaret Arney	4,238	64.92
Democratic	Angela Kennedy	2,274	34.83
Write-in		16	0.25
Total votes		6,528	100.0

District 18 general election
Party	Candidate	Votes	%
Democratic	Margaret Arney	20,801	82.19
Republican	Kevin Andre Anderson	4,431	17.51
Write-in		76	0.30
Total votes		25,308	100.0
Democratic hold			

=== District 19 ===
Results by precinct: Clancy—50–60% Clancy—60–70% Clancy—70–80% Anderson—50–60% Anderson—60–70% Anderson—70–80% Tied—40–50% Tied—50% No votes

Incumbent Democrat Ryan Clancy ran for re-election. In the primary Clancy faced activist Jarrod Anderson. Clancy, one of the two members of the Wisconsin Democrat's Socialist Caucus, faced opposition due to his criticism of the Biden Administration and support for Uncommitted in the presidential primary, positions on the Gaza war, and his maverick position within the Democratic caucus more generally. This stood in contrast with Anderson, who campaigned as a "pragmatic progressive", that would be more collaborative with the broader Democratic caucus than Clancy. During the campaign, Anderson garnered endorsements from numerous Democrats in the Assembly and Milwaukee political landscape opposed to Clancy's campaign. Clancy defeated Anderson by 9 points in the primary election and was unopposed in the general election.

District 19 Democratic primary
Party	Candidate	Votes	%
Democratic	Ryan Clancy (incumbent)	6,641	54.77
Democratic	Jarrod Anderson	5,460	45.03
Write-in		24	0.2
Total votes		12,125	100.0

District 19 general election
Party	Candidate	Votes	%
Democratic	Ryan Clancy (incumbent)	30,112	97.61
Write-in		736	2.39
Total votes		30,848	100.0
Democratic hold			

=== District 20 ===
Results by precinct: Sinicki—50–60% Sinicki—60–70% Sinicki—70–80% Sinicki—80–90% Moeller—50–60%

Incumbent Democrat Christine Sinicki ran for re-election. In the general election she defeated Republican Mike Moeller.

District 20 general election
Party	Candidate	Votes	%
Democratic	Christine Sinicki (incumbent)	20,018	61.01
Republican	Mike Moeller	12,740	38.83
Write-in		53	0.16
Total votes		32,811	100.0
Democratic hold			

=== District 21 ===
Precinct results: Rodriguez—40–50% Rodriguez—50–60% Rodriguez—60–70% Marstellar—50–60% Marstellar—60–70% Marstellar—70–80% Marstellar—80–90% No votes

Incumbent Republican Jessie Rodriguez ran for re-election. In the general election she defeated Democrat David Marstellar.

District 21 general election
Party	Candidate	Votes	%
Republican	Jessie Rodriguez (incumbent)	16,923	51.27
Democratic	David L. Marstellar	15,993	48.45
Write-in		93	0.28
Total votes		33,009	100.0
Republican hold			

=== District 22 ===
Incumbent Republican Janel Brandtjen was moved into the 24th district due to redistricting, where she unsuccessfully attempted to gain the Republican nomination. Fellow Republican Paul Melotik ran for re-election after being moved into this district due to redistricting. In the general election he defeated Democrat Dana Glasstein.

District 22 general election
Party	Candidate	Votes	%
Republican	Paul Melotik	23,566	58.00
Democratic	Dana Glasstein	17,014	41.88
Write-in		48	0.12
Total votes		40,628	100.0
Republican hold			

=== District 23 ===
Incumbent Democrat Deb Andraca ran for re-election. In the general election she defeated Republican Laurie Wolf.

District 23 general election
Party	Candidate	Votes	%
Democratic	Deb Andraca (incumbent)	23,804	62.57
Republican	Laurie Wolf	14,199	37.32
Write-in		43	0.11
Total votes		38,046	100.0
Democratic hold			

=== District 24 ===
Incumbent Republican Paul Melotik was moved into the 22nd district due to redistricting. Fellow Republican Janel Brandtjen was running for re-election after being moved into this district due to redistricting. She faced Dan Knodl, state senator and former representative for this district in the primary. Brandtjen had previously represented the 22nd district prior to redistricting and had run against Knodl in the 2023 special election for the 8th Senate district. Brandtjen has been subject to controversy due to her combative relationship with the Republican Caucus and repeated attempts to decertify Joe Biden's victory in the 2020 United States presidential election. Due to her controversies she was barred from attending Assembly Republican closed caucus meetings in November 2022. Additionally, she was charged with a felony by the Wisconsin Ethics Commission for an alleged plot to skirt campaign finance laws, though charges have not yet been brought. In May 2024 Brandtjen was endorsed by Donald Trump. Knodl, having originally represented this district from 2009 to 2023, claimed a desire to run again to give the assembly "a conservative who is respected by his colleagues", as Brandtjen had been barred from closed caucus meetings due to a lack of trust. Knodl also ran again as to avoid a primary in the Senate with fellow state senator Duey Stroebel. Knodl defeated Brandtjen by a 30 point margin. He defeated Democrat William Walter, head of Our Wisconsin Revolution, in the general election.

District 24 Republican primary
Party	Candidate	Votes	%
Republican	Dan Knodl	6,870	64.90
Republican	Janel Brandtjen	3,692	34.88
Write-in		24	0.22
Total votes		10,585	100.0

District 24 general election
Party	Candidate	Votes	%
Republican	Dan Knodl	23,858	59.94
Democratic	William Walter	15,887	39.91
Write-in		61	0.15
Total votes		39,806	100.0
Republican hold			

=== District 25 ===
Incumbent Republican Paul Tittl ran for re-election. He faced business owner David Wage in the primary election. During the campaign the two candidates agreed on several policies, such as the legalization of medical marijuana and using the state surplus for tax cuts. The candidates differed on the finer details of certain policies, such as the time after which abortion is banned, with Wage also arguing the district needed new representation. Tittl defeated Wage by a 19-point margin. He defeated Democrat Stephen Welch in the general election by a wide margin.

District 25 Republican primary
Party	Candidate	Votes	%
Republican	Paul Tittl (incumbent)	4,203	59.65
Republican	David Wage	2,833	40.21
Write-in		10	0.14
Total votes		7,046	100.0

District 25 general election
Party	Candidate	Votes	%
Republican	Paul Tittl (incumbent)	19,587	61.72
Democratic	Stephen R. Welch	12,123	38.20
Write-in		26	0.08
Total votes		31,736	100.0
Republican hold			

=== District 26 ===
Incumbent Republican Terry Katsma declined to seek re-election, leaving this district open. Fellow Republican Amy Binsfeld sought re-election in this district after being moved from the 27th district into the 25th due to redistricting. Early in the campaign, Binsfeld distanced herself from the Sheboygan County Republican Party due to their positions on abortion and the 2020 United States presidential election. This led to the party refusing to support her campaign and distribute campaign materials. Due to this lack of support, the chair of the county party, Russ Otten, predicted that Binsfeld would fail to be re-elected. Binsfeld was defeated by Democrat Joe Sheehan, a former superintendent of Sheboygan schools and executive director of the Sheboygan County Economic Development Corporation, in the general election.

Prior to 2011, the 26th district had encompassed the city of Sheboygan and some surrounding villages and had leaned towards the Democratic Party. Following the 2011 gerrymander, which had divided Sheboygan between an altered 26th and 27th districts, Democratic voting power was diluted as a means to produce two Republican leaning districts. Sheboygan and its split between two districts had been the example of gerrymandering in Wisconsin used in the case Gil v. Whitford. Under the new maps, the district is one of the most politically competitive districts in the state, being rated as a tossup with a slight Democratic lean in the election.

District 26 general election
Party	Candidate	Votes	%
Democratic	Joe Sheehan	14,887	51.35
Republican	Amy Binsfeld	14,042	48.43
Write-in		64	0.22
Total votes		28,993	100.0
Democratic gain from Republican			

=== District 27 ===
Incumbent Republican Amy Binsfeld was moved into the 25th district due to redistricting, leaving this district open. Two candidates filed to succeed Binsfeld, marketing professional Lindee Brill, and Oostburg village president Brian Hilbelink. The primary tested the influence of Vos, as Brill positioned herself as an outsider while Hilbelink was supported by Vos and his allies. During the campaign, the Stronger Wisconsin Fund and other PACs ran ads claiming Brill would vote to strip overseas military voters of their ability to vote. Brill came out on top in the primary by a slim two-point margin, and defeated Democrat Kay Ladson by a wide margin in the general election.

District 27 Republican primary
Party	Candidate	Votes	%
Republican	Lindee Brill	4,670	51.33
Republican	Brian Hilbelink	4,421	48.59
Write-in		7	0.08
Total votes		9,098	100.0

District 27 general election
Party	Candidate	Votes	%
Republican	Lindee Brill	25,477	67.66
Democratic	Kay Ladson	12,139	32.24
Write-in		41	0.10
Total votes		37,657	100.0
Republican hold			

=== District 28 ===
Incumbent Republican Gae Magnafici declined to seek re-election, leaving this district open. In the primary Robin Kreibich, a former representative for the Wisconsin's 93rd Assembly district, faced off against Brady Penfield, a student at the University of Wisconsin–River Falls and defeated him by a margin of 45 votes. During the campaign, Penfield had run to the right of Kreibich and had the support of the St. Croix County Republican Party. Kreibich defeated Democrat Danielle Johnson, a veterinarian, in the general election by a 33-point margin.

District 28 Republican primary
Party	Candidate	Votes	%
Republican	Robin Kreibich	2,888	50.30
Republican	Brady Penfield	2,843	49.53
Write-in		10	0.17
Total votes		5,741	100.0

District 28 general election
Party	Candidate	Votes	%
Republican	Robin Kreibich	23,979	66.14
Democratic	Danielle Johnson	12,245	33.77
Write-in		32	0.09
Total votes		36,256	100.0
Republican hold			

=== District 29 ===
Incumbent Republican Clint Moses was moved into the 92nd district due to redistricting. Fellow Republican Treig Pronschinske ran for re-election after being moved into this district due to redistricting. In the general election he defeated Democrat Terrance Schoonover by a 29-point margin.

District 29 general election
Party	Candidate	Votes	%
Republican	Treig Pronschinske	21,619	64.89
Democratic	Terrance Schoonover	11,675	35.05
Write-in		20	0.06
Total votes		33,314	100.0
Republican hold			

=== District 30 ===
Precinct results: Zimmerman—50–60% Zimmerman—60–70% Page—50–60%

Incumbent Republican Shannon Zimmerman ran for re-election. He defeated Democrat and former hospital administrator Alison Page in the general election by a nine-point margin. This race was expected to be one of the closest in the cycle, and Zimmerman was targeted by Democrats as part of the "No More Games" campaign for his inaction on the Joint Finance Committee and his positions on abortion.

District 30 general election
Party	Candidate	Votes	%
Republican	Shannon Zimmerman (incumbent)	20,309	54.21
Democratic	Alison Page	17,117	45.69
Write-in		38	0.10
Total votes		37,464	100.0
Republican hold			

=== District 31 ===
Incumbent Republican Ellen Schutt declined to seek re-election, leaving this district open. There was no primary election for either party in this district. Republican majority leader Tyler August moved into this district to avoid a primary election with a fellow incumbent in the 32nd district. He defeated Democrat John Henderson in the general election.

District 31 general election
Party	Candidate	Votes	%
Republican	Tyler August	20,769	63.32
Democratic	John Henderson	11,965	36.47
Write-in		68	0.21
Total votes		32,802	100.0
Republican hold			

=== District 32 ===
Incumbent Republican Tyler August sought re-election in the 31st district after fellow Republican Amanda Nedweski was moved into this district due to redistricting. Nedweski defeated Democrat Michael Dhindsa in the general election.

District 32 general election
Party	Candidate	Votes	%
Republican	Amanda Nedweski	24,257	67.93
Democratic	Michael Dhindsa	11,409	31.95
Write-in		43	0.12
Total votes		35,709	100.0
Republican hold			

=== District 33 ===
Incumbent Republican Scott Johnson was moved into the 97th district due to redistricting. Fellow Republican and Speaker of the Wisconsin State Assembly Robin Vos ran for re-election after being moved into this district due to redistricting. In the primary Vos was unopposed after his opponent dropped out of the race, despite this, Cegielski still managed to get 30% of the vote. Vos defeated Democrat Alan Kupsik and Independent Kelly Clark in the general election by a wide margin.

District 33 Republican primary
Party	Candidate	Votes	%
Republican	Robin Vos	5,368	69.00
Republican	Andrew Cegielski (withdrawn)	2,390	30.72
Write-in		22	0.28
Total votes		7,780	100.0

District 33 general election
Party	Candidate	Votes	%
Republican	Robin Vos	20,555	56.97
Democratic	Alan Kupsik	10,739	29.76
Independent	Kelly Clark	4,743	13.14
Write-in		46	0.13
Total votes		36,083	100.0
Republican hold			

=== District 34 ===
Incumbent Republican Rob Swearingen ran for re-election. He defeated Democrat Dennis Nitzel in the general election by a 29-point margin.

District 34 general election
Party	Candidate	Votes	%
Republican	Rob Swearingen (incumbent)	25,040	64.06
Democratic	Dennis Nitzel	14,027	35.88
Write-in		24	0.06
Total votes		39,091	100.0
Republican hold			

=== District 35 ===
Incumbent Republican Calvin Callahan ran for re-election. He defeated Republican Todd Mayr in the primary and defeated Democrat Elizabeth McCrank in the general election.

District 35 Republican primary
Party	Candidate	Votes	%
Republican	Calvin Callahan (incumbent)	6,867	84.64
Republican	Todd Mayr	1,238	15.26
Write-in		8	0.10
Total votes		8,113	100.0

District 35 general election
Party	Candidate	Votes	%
Republican	Calvin Callahan (incumbent)	24,421	67.73
Democratic	Elizabeth McCrank	11,616	32.22
Write-in		19	0.05
Total votes		36,056	100.0
Republican hold			

=== District 36 ===
Incumbent Republican Jeffrey Mursau ran for re-election. He defeated Democrat Benjamin Murray in the general election.

District 36 general election
Party	Candidate	Votes	%
Republican	Jeffrey Mursau (incumbent)	24,905	70.77
Democratic	Benjamin Murray	10,182	28.93
Write-in		103	0.29
Total votes		35,190	100.0
Republican hold			

=== District 37 ===
Incumbent Republican William Penterman was moved into the neighboring 42nd district due to redistricting, leaving this district open. Fellow Republican Mark Born ran for re-election after being moved into this district due to redistricting. He first defeated Republican challenger Steve Rydzewski in the primary election and then defeated Democrat LaToya Bates in the general election.

District 37 Republican primary
Party	Candidate	Votes	%
Republican	Mark Born	4,701	69.45
Republican	Steve Rydzewski	2,068	30.55
Total votes		6,769	100.0

District 37 general election
Party	Candidate	Votes	%
Republican	Mark Born	20,977	68.58
Democratic	LaToya Bates	9,608	31.41
Write-in		4	0.01
Total votes		30,589	100.0
Republican hold			

=== District 38 ===
Incumbent Republican Barbara Dittrich was moved into the neighboring 99th district due to redistricting, leaving this district open. Fellow Republican William Penterman sought re-election in this district after being moved from the 37th district into the 42nd due to redistricting. Penterman defeated Democrat Izzy Nevarez in the general election.

District 38 general election
Party	Candidate	Votes	%
Republican	William Penterman	22,163	67.27
Democratic	Izzy Nevarez	10,745	32.61
Write-in		40	0.12
Total votes		32,948	100.0
Republican hold			

=== District 39 ===
Incumbent Republican Mark Born was moved into the neighboring 37th district due to redistricting, leaving this district open. Fellow Republican Alex Dallman ran for re-election after being moved into this district due to redistricting. He defeated Democrat Chris Gordon in the general election.

District 39 general election
Party	Candidate	Votes	%
Republican	Alex Dallman	23,266	69.53
Democratic	Chris Gordon	10,168	30.39
Write-in		28	0.08
Total votes		33,462	100.0
Republican hold			

=== District 40 ===
Incumbent Republican Kevin David Petersen was moved into the neighboring 57th district due to redistricting, leaving this district open. Only one Republican, Sauk County Republican Party chair Jerry Helmer, filed to succeed Petersen. Three Democrats filed to challenge Helmer, former CEO of Boys and Girls Club Karen DeSanto, engineer Kyle Kunicki, and realtor Brad Cook. After declining to seek re-election, Democrat Dave Considine, who had been moved into the 40th district due to redistricting, looked to recruit several Democratic candidates to succeed him, one of which had been DeSanto. During the campaign, the three candidates attempted to differentiate themselves on their experience and qualifications. Cook campaigned as a representative of rural constituents in the district, Kunicki emphasized his voter-outreach, while DeSanto campaigned on her ability to work with other legislators. Additionally, the three candidates faced criticisms of their candidacies, with some criticizing DeSanto online for her past work as a clown. Cook faced criticism for past posts online where he suggested "finding intelligent life forms in the City of Portage today is more of a struggle than normal," while DeSanto and Cook both criticized Kunicki for his youth and perceived inexperience. DeSanto defeated both Kunicki and Cook by a wide margin, winning an outright majority of the vote. DeSanto then defeated Republican Jerry Helmer in the general election by a 9-point margin.

District 40 Democratic primary
Party	Candidate	Votes	%
Democratic	Karen DeSanto	4,408	53.29
Democratic	Kyle Kunicki	2,004	24.23
Democratic	Brad Cook	1,858	22.46
Write-in		2	0.02
Total votes		8,272	100.0

District 40 general election
Party	Candidate	Votes	%
Democratic	Karen DeSanto	17,949	54.09
Republican	Jerry Helmer	15,221	45.87
Write-in		16	0.05
Total votes		33,186	100.0
Democratic gain from Republican			

=== District 41 ===
Incumbent Republican Alex Dallman was moved into the 39th district due to redistricting, leaving this district open. Fellow Republican Tony Kurtz ran for re-election after being moved into this district due to redistricting. He defeated Democrat Julia Henley in the general election.

District 41 general election
Party	Candidate	Votes	%
Republican	Tony Kurtz	19,996	63.08
Democratic	Julia Henley	11,677	36.84
Write-in		24	0.08
Total votes		31,697	100.0
Republican hold			

=== District 42 ===
Incumbent Republican Jon Plumer declined to seek re-election, leaving this district open. Democrat Maureen McCarville, a Dane County supervisor ran for the new Democratic leaning district. During the campaign, McCarville ran on expanding abortion rights and protecting the environment, facing Republican Rebecca Witherspoon, who ran on freezing property taxes for certain individuals. In the general election, McCarville defeated Witherspoon by an 11-point margin, flipping the district.

District 42 general election
Party	Candidate	Votes	%
Democratic	Maureen McCarville	20,400	55.01
Republican	Rebecca Witherspoon	16,648	44.89
Write-in		38	0.10
Total votes		37,086	100.0
Democratic gain from Republican			

=== District 43 ===
Precinct results: Johnson—50–60% Johnson—60–70% Johnson—70–80% Johnson—80–90% Kurtz—50–60% Kurtz—60–70% Tie—50%

Precinct results: Brown—50–60% Brown—60–70% Johnson—50–60% Johnson—60–70% Johnson—100%

Incumbent Democrat Jenna Jacobson was moved into the neighboring 50th district due to redistricting, leaving this district open. Republican Scott Johnson sought re-election in this district after being moved from the 33rd district into the 97th due to redistricting. In the Republican primary, Johnson faced Dylan Kurtz and defeated him by a wide margin. He was defeated by Democrat Brienne Brown, an educator and Whitewater Common Council member, in the general election by a three-point margin.

District 43 Republican primary
Party	Candidate	Votes	%
Republican	Scott Johnson	3,123	70.35
Republican	Dylan Kurtz	1,302	29.33
Write-in		14	0.32
Total votes		4,439	100.0

District 43 general election
Party	Candidate	Votes	%
Democratic	Brienne Brown	16,736	51.24
Republican	Scott Johnson	15,889	48.64
Write-in		39	0.12
Total votes		32,664	100.0
Democratic hold			

=== District 44 ===
Precinct results: Roe—50–60% Roe—60–70% Roe—70–80% Myers—50–60% Myers—60–70%

Precinct results: Roe—50–60% Roe—60–70% Roe—100% Danielson—50–60% Danielson—60–70% Danielson—100%

Incumbent Democrat Sue Conley declined to seek re-election, leaving this district open. In the Democratic primary, two former congressional candidates, Ann Roe, and Cathy Myers, faced off against one another. During the primary, the two candidates had broadly similar platforms, and both shared policy focuses on education due to their background as educators. Both campaigns advocated for parts of the budget surplus to go towards funding public education in the state. Additionally, both campaigns supported legalizing marijuana in the state. Roe's campaign supported repealing the state's abortion ban, while also reforming the state school funding formula, expanding medicaid, and addressing PFAS contamination. Myers' campaign supported repealing 2011 Wisconsin Act 10, pulling funding from the state's school voucher program, and putting portions of the budget surplus towards housing. Roe defeated Myers by a 10-point margin. Roe went on to defeat Republican Bruce Danielson by a 13-point margin in the general election.

District 44 Democratic primary
Party	Candidate	Votes	%
Democratic	Ann Roe	3,771	54.30
Democratic	Cathy Myers	3,170	45.64
Write-in		4	0.06
Total votes		6,945	100.0

District 44 general election
Party	Candidate	Votes	%
Democratic	Ann Roe	17,335	56.39
Republican	Bruce Danielson	13,371	43.49
Write-in		37	0.12
Total votes		30,743	100.0
Democratic hold			

=== District 45 ===
Incumbent Democrat Clinton Anderson ran for re-election unopposed.

District 45 general election
Party	Candidate	Votes	%
Democratic	Clinton Anderson (incumbent)	19,864	95.87
Write-in		855	4.13
Total votes		20,719	100.0
Democratic hold			

=== District 46 ===
Incumbent Democrat Melissa Ratcliff declined to seek re-election, instead running for Wisconsin Senate in Wisconsin's 16th Senate district, leaving the district open. Democrat and Jefferson County Board of Supervisor Joan Fitzgerald faced Republican and Waterloo mayor Jenifer Quimby in the general election. During the campaign, the two candidates differed on their experiences, the former a former educator and county supervisor, and the latter a business owner and nonpartisan municipal official. Fitzgerald's campaign centered around the issues of affordability, a repeal of Wisconsin's abortion restrictions, gun control, and funding for local public schools. Quimby centered her campaign around affordability and a lack of housing in the district, as well as providing tax cuts to the region. Both candidates expressed support for providing funding to local services. Fitzgerald defeated Quimby by a five-point margin.

District 46 general election
Party	Candidate	Votes	%
Democratic	Joan Fitzgerald	18,985	52.39
Republican	Jenifer Quimby	17,219	47.52
Write-in		32	0.09
Total votes		36,236	100.0
Democratic hold			

=== District 47 ===
Incumbent Democrat Jimmy Anderson declined to seek re-election, instead making an unsuccessful run for Wisconsin Senate in Wisconsin's 16th Senate district, leaving this district open. Two Democrats filed to succeed him, Fitchburg alderman Joe Maldonado and former Fitchburg alderman Randy Udell. During the primary, the two ran distinct campaigns with Maldonado running on his experience at the Verona Area School District, supporting the legalization of cannabis in the state, and to use funding generated from legalization to fund public schools. Udell ran a campaign on expanding broadband for southwestern Dane County, citing his exeprience as a former engineer for AT&T. Udell defeated Maldonado in the primary by a two-point margin and was unopposed in the general election.

District 47 Democratic primary
Party	Candidate	Votes	%
Democratic	Randy Udell	6,699	50.95
Democratic	Joe Maldonado	6,438	48.97
Write-in		11	0.08
Total votes		13,148	100.0

District 47 general election
Party	Candidate	Votes	%
Democratic	Randy Udell	29,040	98.18
Write-in		539	1.82
Total votes		29,579	100.0
Democratic hold			

=== District 48 ===
Incumbent Democrat Samba Baldeh declined to seek re-election, instead making an unsuccessful run for Wisconsin Senate in Wisconsin's 16th Senate district, leaving this district open. Five Democrats joined the race to succeed him, with those five being Bill Connors, nonprofit leader; Andrew Hysell, attorney; Goodwill Obieze, Human Resources manager; Avery Renk, attorney; and Rick Rose, Dane County supervisor. Five days before the primary, Connors, Obieze, Renk, and Rose released a joint statement urging voters to reject Hysell, in the statement they alleged Hysell was not a progressive and had donated to Republicans dating back to 2014. In a response to the statement, he reaffirmed his support for progressive policies and condemned mudslinging in the campaign. In the primary, Hysell placed first, defeating his four other opponents. He advanced to the general election where he defeated Republican Lisa Rubrich, an orthodontist, by a wide margin.

District 48 Democratic primary
Party	Candidate	Votes	%
Democratic	Andrew Hysell	3,423	32.06
Democratic	Bill Connors	2,805	26.28
Democratic	Avery Renk	2,296	21.51
Democratic	Goodwill Obieze	1,544	14.46
Democratic	Rick Rose	591	5.54
Write-in		16	0.15
Total votes		10,675	100.0

District 48 general election
Party	Candidate	Votes	%
Democratic	Andrew Hysell	23,816	67.32
Republican	Lisa Rubrich	11,509	32.53
Write-in		54	0.15
Total votes		35,379	100.0
Democratic hold			

=== District 49 ===
Incumbent Republican Travis Tranel ran for re-election. In the general election he defeated Democrat Scott Walker.

District 49 general election
Party	Candidate	Votes	%
Republican	Travis Tranel (incumbent)	19,701	62.99
Democratic	Scott Walker	11,546	36.92
Write-in		29	0.09
Total votes		31,276	100.0
Republican hold			

=== District 50 ===
Precinct results: Jacobson—50–60% Jacobson—60–70% Jacobson—70–80% Johnson—50–60% Johnson—60–70% Johnson—70–80% Tie—50%

Incumbent Republican Tony Kurtz was moved out of this district due to redistricting. Incumbent Democrat Jenna Jacobson ran for re-election after being moved into this district due to redistricting. In the general election she defeated Republican Richard Johnson by a 13-point margin.

District 50 general election
Party	Candidate	Votes	%
Democratic	Jenna Jacobson	20,418	56.27
Republican	Richard Johnson	15,841	43.66
Write-in		27	0.07
Total votes		36,286	100.0
Democratic gain from Republican			

=== District 51 ===
Precinct results: Novak—50–60% Novak—60–70% Novak—70–80% Novak—80–90% Grabe—50–60% Grabe—60–70% Tie—50%

Incumbent Republican Todd Novak ran for re-election. He faced Democrat Elizabeth Grabe in the general election. Historically, this district had been a Republican leaning competitive district throughout much of the 2010s, electing Republicans Howard Marklein, and then Todd Novak, by slim margins. In 2021 the district was redrawn to be more Republican, and it gave Novak a 12 point victory in the election. Due to the 2023–2024 redistricting, the district shifted to be more Democratic leaning, where it now is Democratic leaning by an eight-point margin. During the campaign, Novak declined to interact with his opponent, and avoided participating in candidate debates and forums. Novak defeated Grabe by a three-point margin.

District 51 general election
Party	Candidate	Votes	%
Republican	Todd Novak (incumbent)	17,682	51.66
Democratic	Elizabeth Grabe	16,524	48.27
Write-in		24	0.07
Total votes		34,230	100.0
Republican hold			

=== District 52 ===
Incumbent Republican Jerry L. O'Connor was moved into the 60th district due to redistricting, where his district was effectively renumbered. Incumbent Democrat Lee Snodgrass was moved into the 52nd district due to redistricting, as her district had been effectively renumbered. She defeated Republican Chad Cooke in the general election by a 15-point margin.

District 52 general election
Party	Candidate	Votes	%
Democratic	Lee Snodgrass (incumbent)	17,681	57.25
Republican	Chad Cooke	13,203	42.75
Write-in		0	0.00
Total votes		30,884	100.0
Democratic hold			

=== District 53 ===
Results by precinct: Kaufert—50–60% Shukoski—50–60% Shukoski—60–70%

Incumbent Republican Michael Schraa was moved into the 55th district due to redistricting, where he attempted to gain the Republican nomination, leaving this district open. There was no primary election for either party in this district. Republican Dean Kaufert, a former mayor of Neenah, defeated Democrat and union leader Duane Shukoski in the general election by a margin of 364 votes.

District 53 general election
Party	Candidate	Votes	%
Republican	Dean Kaufert	15,801	50.51
Democratic	Duane Shukoski	15,437	49.35
Write-in		42	0.13
Total votes		31,280	100.0
Republican hold			

=== District 54 ===
Incumbent Democrat Lori Palmeri ran for re-election. She defeated Republican Tim Paterson in the general election by a five-point margin.

District 52 general election
Party	Candidate	Votes	%
Democratic	Lori Palmeri (incumbent)	14,003	52.57
Republican	Tim Paterson	12,590	47.27
Write-in		42	0.16
Total votes		26,635	100.0
Democratic hold			

=== District 55 ===
Incumbent Republican Nate Gustafson ran for re-election. He faced fellow Republican legislator Michael Schraa, who had been moved into this district due to redistricting, and defeated him by ten points. Gustafson defeated Democrat Kyle Kehoe in the general election.

District 55 Republican primary
Party	Candidate	Votes	%
Republican	Nate Gustafson (incumbent)	4,643	55.01
Republican	Michael Schraa	3,787	44.86
Write-in		11	0.13
Total votes		8,441	100.0

District 55 general election
Party	Candidate	Votes	%
Republican	Nate Gustafson (incumbent)	22,609	60.37
Democratic	Kyle Kehoe	14,803	39.53
Write-in		40	0.11
Total votes		37,452	100.0
Republican hold			

=== District 56 ===
Incumbent Republican Dave Murphy ran for re-election. He defeated Democrat Emily Tseffos in the general election.

District 56 general election
Party	Candidate	Votes	%
Republican	Dave Murphy (incumbent)	23,789	64.74
Democratic	Emily Tseffos	12,950	35.24
Write-in		6	0.02
Total votes		36,745	100.0
Republican hold			

=== District 57 ===
Incumbent Democrat Lee Snodgrass was moved into the 52nd district due to redistricting, as her district had been effectively renumbered. Incumbent Republican Kevin David Petersen was moved into this district due to redistricting, as his district had been effectively renumbered. Peterson defeated insurance agent Duane Wilson in the primary. During the campaign the two ran on similar conservative platforms, but Wilson took positions to Peterson's right on abortion, the attempted impeachment of Wisconsin Elections Commission chair Meagan Wolfe, and the legitimacy of the 2020 United States presidential election. Petersen defeated Wilson by a wide margin. Peterson defeated Democrat Ruth Caves and Independent Dylan Testin in the general election.

District 57 Republican primary
Party	Candidate	Votes	%
Republican	Kevin David Petersen (incumbent)	6,156	62.97
Republican	Duane Wilson	3,606	36.89
Write-in		14	0.14
Total votes		9,776	100.0

District 57 general election
Party	Candidate	Votes	%
Republican	Kevin David Petersen (incumbent)	22,044	62.31
Democratic	Ruth Caves	10,048	28.40
Independent	Dylan Testin	3,261	9.22
Write-in		24	0.07
Total votes		35,377	100.0
Republican hold			

=== District 58 ===
Incumbent Republican Rick Gundrum ran for re-election. He defeated Democrat Deb Anderson in the general election.

District 58 general election
Party	Candidate	Votes	%
Republican	Rick Gundrum (incumbent)	26,847	71.26
Democratic	Deb Anderson	10,786	28.63
Write-in		42	0.11
Total votes		37,675	100.0
Republican hold			

=== District 59 ===
Incumbent Republican Ty Bodden declined to seek re-election, leaving this district open. Fellow Republican Robert Brooks ran for re-election after being moved into this district due to redistricting. He defeated Democrat Jack Holzman in the general election.

District 59 general election
Party	Candidate	Votes	%
Republican	Robert Brooks	29,315	75.71
Democratic	Jack Holzman	9,369	24.20
Write-in		35	0.09
Total votes		38,719	100.0
Republican hold			

=== District 60 ===
Incumbent Republican Robert Brooks was moved into the 59th district due to redistricting. Fellow Republican Jerry L. O'Connor ran for re-election after moved into the 60th district due to redistricting, where his district was effectively renumbered. In the general election O'Connor defeated Democrat Joe Lavrenz in a rematch of the 2022 race.

District 60 general election
Party	Candidate	Votes	%
Republican	Jerry L. O'Connor (incumbent)	17,283	60.11
Democratic	Joe Lavrenz	11,453	39.84
Write-in		15	0.05
Total votes		28,751	100.0
Republican hold			

=== District 61 ===
Incumbent Republican Amanda Nedweski was moved into the 32nd district due to redistricting, leaving this district open. Fellow Republican Bob Donovan sought re-election in this district after being moved from the 82nd district into the 7th due to redistricting. Donovan defeated Martin Gomez by a wide margin in the Republican primary. Donovan then faced Democrat LuAnn Bird in the general election, in a rematch from 2022. In the 2022 race, Bird had been part of Democratic efforts to protect Governor Evers' veto, and this time was part of the Democratic push for a majority thanks to this district's narrow margins. Donovan defeated Bird by a three-point margin

Results by precinct: Donovan—50–60% Bird—50–60% No votes

District 61 Republican primary
Party	Candidate	Votes	%
Republican	Bob Donovan	5,281	92.62
Republican	Martin Gomez	413	7.24
Write-in		8	0.14
Total votes		5,702	100.0

District 61 general election
Party	Candidate	Votes	%
Republican	Bob Donovan	17,618	51.54
Democratic	LuAnn Bird	16,511	48.30
Write-in		54	0.16
Total votes		34,183	100.0
Republican hold			

=== District 62 ===
Incumbent Republican Robert Wittke moved into the neighboring 63rd district, leaving this district open. The only candidate to file was Racine teachers' union president Angelina Cruz, who won the election without opposition.

District 62 general election
Party	Candidate	Votes	%
Democratic	Angelina Cruz	19,060	95.24
Write-in		953	4.76
Total votes		20,013	100.0
Democratic gain from Republican			

=== District 63 ===
Incumbent Republican Robin Vos was moved into the neighboring 33rd district due to redistricting, leaving this district open. Fellow Republican Robert Wittke moved from the neighboring 62nd district to the 63rd and ran for re-election unopposed.

District 63 general election
Party	Candidate	Votes	%
Republican	Robert Wittke	27,163	96.80
Write-in		897	3.20
Total votes		28,060	100.0
Republican hold			

=== District 64 ===
Incumbent Democrat Tip McGuire ran for re-election. He defeated Republican Ed Hibsch in the general election by an 11-point margin in a rematch of 2022.

District 64 general election
Party	Candidate	Votes	%
Democratic	Tip McGuire	15,816	55.59
Republican	Ed Hibsch	12,576	44.21
Write-in		57	0.20
Total votes		28,449	100.0
Democratic hold			

=== District 65 ===
Incumbent Democrat Tod Ohnstad declined to seek re-election, leaving this district open. Educator Ben DeSmidt defeated Kyle Flood in the Democratic primary and Republican Brian Gonzales in the general election.

District 65 Democratic primary
Party	Candidate	Votes	%
Democratic	Ben DeSmidt	3,738	69.51
Democratic	Kyle Flood	1,637	30.44
Write-in		3	0.05
Total votes		8,099	100.0

District 65 general election
Party	Candidate	Votes	%
Democratic	Ben DeSmidt	15,065	53.27
Republican	Brian Gonzales	13,166	46.55
Write-in		52	0.18
Total votes		28,283	100.0
Democratic hold			

=== District 66 ===
Incumbent Democrat and Minority Leader Greta Neubauer ran for re-election. She defeated Republican David DeGroot, the village president of Mount Pleasant, in the general election.

District 66 general election
Party	Candidate	Votes	%
Democratic	Greta Neubauer (incumbent)	15,767	53.89
Republican	David DeGroot	13,426	45.89
Write-in		67	0.22
Total votes		29,260	100.0%
Democratic hold			

=== District 67 ===
Incumbent Republican Rob Summerfield was moved into the 68th district due to redistricting. Fellow Republican David Armstrong ran for re-election after being moved into this district due to redistricting. In the primary, Armstrong defeated challenger Jimmy Swenson. In the general election Armstrong defeated Democrat Jeffrey Foster.

District 67 Republican primary
Party	Candidate	Votes	%
Republican	Dave Armstrong	5,655	77.96
Republican	Jimmy Swenson	1,589	21.91
Write-in		10	0.14
Total votes		7,254	100.0

District 67 general election
Party	Candidate	Votes	%
Republican	David Armstrong	23,049	67.63
Democratic	Jeffrey Foster	11,021	32.34
Write-in		13	0.04
Total votes		34,083	100.0
Republican hold			

=== District 68 ===
Incumbent Republican Karen Hurd was moved into the 69th district due to redistricting. Fellow Republicans James W. Edming and Rob Summerfield were moved into this district due to redistricting. Edming, who had represented the 87th district since 2014, retired and Summerfield ran for re-election in this district. Summerfield faced Ladysmith business owner Cliff Taylor in the primary. Summerfield defeated Taylor by a wide margin, and defeated Democrat Richard Pulcher in the general election by a wide margin.

District 68 Republican primary
Party	Candidate	Votes	%
Republican	Rob Summerfield	6,036	63.92
Republican	Cliff Taylor	3,401	36.01
Write-in		7	0.07
Total votes		9,444	100.0

District 68 general election
Party	Candidate	Votes	%
Republican	Rob Summerfield	25,631	72.81
Democratic	Richard Pulcher	9,549	27.13
Write-in		22	0.06
Total votes		35,202	100.0
Republican hold			

=== District 69 ===
Incumbent Republican Donna Rozar was moved into the 86th district due to redistricting, where she attempted to gain the Republican nomination, leaving this district open. Fellow Republican Karen Hurd sought re-election in this district after being moved from the 68th district into the 91st due to redistricting. Hurd faced Abbotsford mayor Lori Voss in the primary. The two capaigns differed on how to use the state budget surplus, marijuana legalization, and abortion access, but agreed on eliminating diversity, equity, and inclusion efforts in the state and banning transgener athletes from playing in women's sports. Hurd defeated Voss by a 15-point margin. Hurd went on to defeat Democrat Roger Halls and Independent Joshua Kelley in the general election.

District 69 Republican primary
Party	Candidate	Votes	%
Republican	Karen Hurd	3,892	57.17
Republican	Lori J. Voss	2,909	42.73
Write-in		7	0.10
Total votes		6,808	100.0

District 69 general election
Party	Candidate	Votes	%
Republican	Karen Hurd	19,534	71.89
Democratic	Roger Halls	6,565	24.16
Independent	Joshua Kelley	1,058	3.89
Write-in		16	0.06
Total votes		27,173	100.0
Republican hold			

=== District 70 ===
Incumbent Republican Nancy VanderMeer ran for re-election. She defeated Democrat Remberto Gomez in the general election.

District 70 general election
Party	Candidate	Votes	%
Republican	Nancy VanderMeer (incumbent)	19,344	66.73
Democratic	Remberto Gomez	9,626	33.21
Write-in		18	0.06
Total votes		28,988	100.0
Republican hold			

=== District 71 ===
Incumbent Democrat Katrina Shankland declined to seek re-election, leaving this district open. Democrat Vinnie Miresse defeated Republican Robert Pahmeier in the general election.

District 71 general election
Party	Candidate	Votes	%
Democratic	Vinnie Miresse	18,631	53.13
Republican	Robert Pahmeier	16,416	46.82
Write-in		18	0.05
Total votes		35,065	100.0
Democratic hold			

=== District 72 ===
Incumbent Republican Scott Krug ran for re-election. He defeated Democrat Suzanne M. Campbell in the general election.

District 72 general election
Party	Candidate	Votes	%
Republican	Scott Krug (incumbent)	21,993	63.89
Democratic	Suzanne M. Campbell	12,407	36.05
Write-in		21	0.06
Total votes		28,988	100.0
Republican hold			

=== District 73 ===
Precinct results: Stroud—50–60% Stroud—60–70% Stroud—70–80% Stroud—80–90% Kostka—50–60% Kostka—60–70% Tied—50%

Incumbent Republican Angie Sapik declined to seek re-election, leaving this district open. Educator Angela Stroud defeated farmer John Adams in the Democratic primary and Republican Frank Kostka in the general election.

District 73 Democratic primary
Party	Candidate	Votes	%
Democratic	Angela Stroud	6,490	80.13
Democratic	John Adams	1,603	19.80
Write-in		6	0.07
Total votes		8,099	100.0

District 73 general election
Party	Candidate	Votes	%
Democratic	Angela Stroud	19,265	58.32
Republican	Frank Kostka	13,720	41.53
Write-in		48	0.15
Total votes		33,033	100.0
Democratic gain from Republican			

=== District 74 ===
Precinct results: Green—50–60% Green—60–70% Green—70–80% Green—80–90% Green—>90% Harbridge—50–60% Harbridge—60–70% Harbridge—70–80% Harbridge—80–90% Harbridge—>90%

Incumbent Republican Chanz Green ran for re-election. He faced and defeated Scott Harbridge, a veteran from Radisson in the primary election. Prior to redistricting, the town of Summit, Wisconsin was placed within the 73rd assembly district, but it was moved into the 74th assembly district. On the day of the primary, county officials learned that ballots contained candidates for the 73rd, and not the 74th, district. Under current Wisconsin law, there is no procedure to handle votes cast for a different district's candidates, and it is up to the discretion of local officials to decide a course of action. Harbridge called for a new primary election in the 74th district as a result of the error. Regardless, Green advanced to the general election, where he defeated Democrat Jeanne Bruce by a wide margin.

District 74 Republican primary
Party	Candidate	Votes	%
Republican	Chanz Green (incumbent)	3,955	56.43
Republican	Scott Harbridge	3,034	43.29
Write-in		24	0.20
Total votes		7,008	100.0

District 74 general election
Party	Candidate	Votes	%
Republican	Chanz Green (incumbent)	23,396	62.44
Democratic	Jeanne Bruce	14,051	37.50
Write-in		21	0.06
Total votes		37,468	100.0
Republican hold			

=== District 75 ===
Precinct results: Tucker—30–40% Tucker—40–50% Tucker—50–60% Tucker—60–70% Tucker—70–80% Tucker—80–90% Calhoun—30–40% Calhoun—40–50% Calhoun—60–70% Kline—30–40% Tie—40–50% (Note: Tie between Tucker and Calhoun)

Incumbent Republican David Armstrong was moved into the 67th district due to redistricting, leaving this district open. The first candidate to announce a campaign was Jay Calhoun, who had initially announced a primary challenge against Republican Gae Magnafici in the old 28th district. Following Magnafici's retirement, Burnett County supervisor Duke Tucker and family support provider Neil Kline jumped into the race. All three candidates ran on platforms which included rolling back the size of the government, with Tucker having a more standard conservative platform on issues such as immigration, the 2nd Amendment, and fiscal conservatism, while Kline also focused on issues of rural advocacy and housing. Tucker defeated Calhoun in the primary with a 19-point margin, with Kline garnering 19% of the vote. Tucker then faced Democrat Jane Kleiss in the general election. During the campaign, Tucker called for a lessening of political division, and, like his Democratic opponent, expressed support for Democratic-led efforts to combat pollution from PFAS in the region.

District 75 Republican primary
Party	Candidate	Votes	%
Republican	Duke Tucker	4,161	49.91
Republican	Jay Calhoun	2,543	30.50
Republican	Neil Kline	1,633	19.59
Total votes		8,337	100.0

District 75 general election
Party	Candidate	Votes	%
Republican	Duke Tucker	24,642	66.71
Democratic	Jane Kleiss	12,298	33.29
Write-in		0	0.00
Total votes		36,940	100.0
Republican hold			

=== District 76 ===
Incumbent Democrat Francesca Hong ran for re-election unopposed.

District 76 general election
Party	Candidate	Votes	%
Democratic	Francesca Hong (incumbent)	34,311	98.85
Write-in		398	1.15
Total votes		34,709	100.0
Democratic hold			

=== District 77 ===
Results by precinct: Mayadev—40–50% Mayadev—50–60% Mayadev—60–70% Schumacher—40–50% Schumacher—50–60% Erickson—40–50% No Votes

Incumbent Democrat Shelia Stubbs was moved into the neighboring 78th district due to redistricting, leaving this district open. Dane County Board member Chuck Erickson and Nonprofit executive Renuka Mayadev first announced campaigns for the open district, with pharmacist Thad Schumacher soon following. The three candidates differentiated themselves based on their backgrounds, as all three supported similar policies on reproductive healthcare, abortion, and healthcare accessibility. Erickson, who is gay, centered his campaign on issues such as reproductive rights and access to healthcare for transgender people, funding education and childcare, and repealing Act 10. Mayadev centered her campaign around women's rights, and supported issues such as access to reproductive healthcare, funding for public education, climate change, preventing gun violence, and extending medicaid coverage to new mothers. Schumacher ran a campaign focused on accessible healthcare, and advocated for policies to expand medicaid and repeal the state abortion ban. Mayadev defeated Schumacher by a 20-point margin, with Erickson drawing roughly 22% of the vote. Mayadev was unopposed in the general election.

District 77 Democratic primary
Party	Candidate	Votes	%
Democratic	Renuka Mayadev	4,802	48.80
Democratic	Thad Schumacher	2,784	28.30
Democratic	Chuck Erickson	2,241	22.77
Write-in		13	0.13
Total votes		9,840	100.0

District 77 general election
Party	Candidate	Votes	%
Democratic	Renuka Mayadev	29,888	98.35
Write-in		500	1.65
Total votes		30,388	100.0
Democratic hold			

=== District 78 ===
Incumbent Democrat Lisa Subeck was moved into the neighboring 79th district due to redistricting. Fellow Democrat Shelia Stubbs ran for re-election after being moved into this district due to redistricting. Stubbs, Madison's first black representative, first ran into controversy in 2022 when she was removed as chair of the Wisconsin Legislative Black Caucus for breaking confidentiality rules. She ran into controversy the following year when she sought the nomination to be director of Dane County Human Services. During the course of her nomination, she criticized the board for calling upon her to resign her assembly seat and was criticized for refusing to condemn racist rhetoric from her supporters. The result was that her nomination for the position was unanimously rejected by the Dane County Board of Supervisors. Some pundits speculated that these controversies could have aided a primary challenger. While she did face a primary challenger, Madison school board member Maia Pearson ultimately ran due to the new maps which had been implemented and to provide a different voice to the incumbent. Pearson ran on a progressive platform, supporting programs like universal 4-year-old kindergarten, providing free school lunches to students, and repealing Act 10. Stubbs defeated Pearson in the Democratic primary by 31 points and was unopposed in the general election.

District 78 Democratic primary
Party	Candidate	Votes	%
Democratic	Shelia Stubbs	9,574	65.78
Democratic	Maia Pearson	4,956	34.05
Write-in		24	0.17
Total votes		15,540	100.0

District 78 general election
Party	Candidate	Votes	%
Democratic	Shelia Stubbs	29,638	98.15
Write-in		560	1.85
Total votes		30,198	100.0
Democratic hold			

=== District 79 ===
Incumbent Democrat Alex Joers was moved into the neighboring 80th district due to redistricting. Fellow Democrat Lisa Subeck ran for re-election unopposed after being moved into this district due to redistricting.

District 79 general election
Party	Candidate	Votes	%
Democratic	Lisa Subeck	32,151	98.60
Write-in		458	1.40
Total votes		32,609	100.0
Democratic hold			

=== District 80 ===
Incumbent Democrat Mike Bare ran for re-election. He defeated Madison Common Council member Nasra Wehelie in the Democratic primary and Republican Robert Relph in the general election.

District 80 Democratic primary
Party	Candidate	Votes	%
Democratic	Mike Bare (incumbent)	12,169	78.31
Democratic	Nasra Wehelie	3,357	21.60
Write-in		14	0.09
Total votes		15,540	100.0

District 80 general election
Party	Candidate	Votes	%
Democratic	Mike Bare (incumbent)	30,593	73.42
Republican	Robert Relph	11,038	26.49
Write-in		36	0.09
Total votes		41,667	100.0
Democratic hold			

=== District 81 ===
Incumbent Democrat Dave Considine declined to seek re-election, leaving this district open. Fellow Democrat Alex Joers sought re-election in this district after being moved from the 79th district into the 80th due to redistricting. Joers was unopposed in the primary and general elections.

District 81 general election
Party	Candidate	Votes	%
Democratic	Alex Joers	30,969	97.74
Write-in		717	2.26
Total votes		31,686	100.0
Democratic hold			

=== District 82 ===
Incumbent Republican Chuck Wichgers was moved into the 84th district due to redistricting. Fellow Republican Scott Allen ran for re-election after being moved into this district due to redistricting. In the Democratic primary Kevin Reilly defeated Samuel N. D'Amico. Allen defeated Reilly in the general election.

District 82 Democratic primary
Party	Candidate	Votes	%
Democratic	Kevin Reilly	2,529	55.30
Democratic	Samuel D'Amico	2,034	44.48
Write-in		10	0.22
Total votes		4,481	100.0

District 82 general election
Party	Candidate	Votes	%
Republican	Scott Allen	18,632	57.18
Democratic	Kevin Reilly	13,917	42.71
Write-in		37	0.11
Total votes		32,586	100.0
Republican hold			

=== District 83 ===
Incumbent Republican Nik Rettinger declined to seek re-election, leaving this district open. Fellow Republican Dave Maxey ran for re-election after being moved into this district due to redistricting. He defeated Democrat Jill Schindler in the general election.

District 83 general election
Party	Candidate	Votes	%
Republican	Dave Maxey	23,772	60.92
Democratic	Jill Schindler	15,194	38.94
Write-in		53	0.14
Total votes		39,019	100.0
Republican hold			

=== District 84 ===
Incumbent Republican Bob Donovan was moved into the 7th district due to redistricting. Fellow Republicans Nik Rettinger and Chuck Wichgers were moved into this district due to redistricting. Rettinger, who had represented the 83rd district since 2022, retired and Wichgers ran for re-election in this district, where he defeated Democrat Zach Roper in the general election.

District 84 general election
Party	Candidate	Votes	%
Republican	Chuck Wichgers	28,676	71.88
Democratic	Zach Roper	11,174	28.01
Write-in		45	0.11
Total votes		39,895	100.0
Republican hold			

=== District 85 ===
Incumbent Republican Patrick Snyder was moved into the neighboring 87th district due to redistricting, but relocated in order to maintain residence in the 85th district and run for re-election. There was no primary election for either party in this district. In the general election, Snyder defeated Democrat Yee Leng Xiong, a Marathon County supervisor and executive director of the Hmong American Center in Wausau.

District 85 general election
Party	Candidate	Votes	%
Republican	Patrick Snyder (incumbent)	15,636	53.17
Democratic	Yee Leng Xiong	13,736	46.71
Write-in		38	0.13
Total votes		29,410	100.0
Republican hold			

=== District 86 ===
Incumbent Republican John Spiros ran for re-election. Fellow Republican Donna Rozar was moved into this district due to redistricting, however she did not gain the Republican nomination after finishing 2nd in the party primary. Both candidates ran for the Republican nomination, with a third candidate, farmer Trine Spindler, also joining the race. The three candidates had major differences in focus, with Spiros focusing on issues of law enforcement and policing, Rozar focusing on issues relating to healthcare and restricting abortion rights, and Spindler campaigning on farm-issues.

District 86 Republican primary
Party	Candidate	Votes	%
Republican	John Spiros (incumbent)	3,709	43.23
Republican	Donna Rozar	2,721	31.71
Republican	Trine Spindler	2,143	24.98
Write-in		7	0.08
Total votes		8,580	100.0

District 86 general election
Party	Candidate	Votes	%
Republican	John Spiros (incumbent)	23,331	66.90
Democratic	John H. Small	11,513	33.01
Write-in		33	0.09
Total votes		34,877	100.00
Republican hold			

=== District 87 ===
Incumbent Republican James W. Edming declined to seek re-election, leaving this district open. Two Republicans filed for the primary, Mosinee mayor Brent Jacobson, and Wausau school board member Cory Sillars. In the campaign, Jacobson ran with the backing of Robin Vos and his allies, with financial support coming from the Stronger Wisconsin Fund. Running against Jacobson, Sillars campaigned as an outsider who would not be beholden to party leadership. Similar to other Republican primary challengers across the state, the Stronger Wisconsin Fund ran campaign material against him.

District 87 Republican primary
Party	Candidate	Votes	%
Republican	Brent Jacobson	6,065	73.92
Republican	Cory Sillars	2,107	25.68
Write-in		33	0.40
Total votes		8,205	100.0

District 87 general election
Party	Candidate	Votes	%
Republican	Brent Jacobson	23,885	66.00
Democratic	William Switalla	12,273	33.91
Write-in		34	0.09
Total votes		36,192	100.0
Republican hold			

=== District 88 ===
Incumbent Republican John Macco declined to seek re-election, leaving this district open. Two candidates filed to succeed Macco, small business owner Ben Franklin and perennial candidate, and 2020 Prohibition nominee for president, Phil Collins. The campaign itself garnered some controversy when a group called the "Stronger Wisconsin Fund," a PAC supporting Republican allies of Robin Vos, sent out mailers claiming Collins supported banning the sale of alcohol, and opposed former president Donald Trump. Franklin eventually defeated Collins by a 35 point margin. Going into the general election, the 88th district was projected to be one of the most competitive in the state, and had the potential to decide what party would control the state assembly in the 107th Wisconsin Legislature. Franklin defeated Democrat Christy Welch in the general election by a margin of 220 votes, in what became one of the closest contests in the whole state.

District 88 Republican primary
Party	Candidate	Votes	%
Republican	Benjamin Franklin	4,608	67.62
Republican	Phil Collins	2,181	32.00
Write-in		26	0.38
Total votes		6,815	100.0

Results by precinct: Franklin—50–60% Franklin—60–70% Welch—50–60%

District 88 general election
Party	Candidate	Votes	%
Republican	Benjamin Franklin	17,008	50.29
Democratic	Christy Welch	16,788	49.64
Write-in		22	0.07
Total votes		33,818	100.0
Republican hold			

=== District 89 ===
Results by precinct: Spaude—50–60% Spaude—60–70% Buckley—50–60% Buckley—60–70%

Incumbent Republican Elijah Behnke was moved into the neighboring 4th district due to redistricting, leaving this district open. Democratic attorney Ryan Spaude defeated Republican and chair of the Brown County Board Patrick J. Buckley in the general election.

District 89 general election
Party	Candidate	Votes	%
Democratic	Ryan Spaude	15,169	51.32
Republican	Patrick J. Buckley	14,343	48.52
Write-in		47	0.16
Total votes		29,559	100.00
Democratic gain from Republican			

=== District 90 ===
Results by precinct: Rivera-Wagner—50–60% Rivera-Wagner—60–70% Henderson—50–60% Henderson—60–70%

Incumbent Democrat Kristina Shelton declined to seek re-election, leaving this district open. Democrat Amaad Rivera-Wagner, chief of staff to Green Bay mayor Eric Genrich, defeated Republican Jessica Henderson in the general election.

District 90 general election
Party	Candidate	Votes	%
Democratic	Amaad Rivera-Wagner	12,446	52.53
Republican	Jessica Henderson	11,222	47.36
Write-in		25	0.11
Total votes		23,693	100.00
Democratic hold			

=== District 91 ===
Precinct results: Emerson—50–60% Emerson—60–70% Emerson—70–80% Skinner—50–60% Skinner—60–70% Skinner—70–80% No votes

Incumbent Democrat Jodi Emerson ran for re-election. She defeated Republican Michele Skinner.

District 91 general election
Party	Candidate	Votes	%
Democratic	Jodi Emerson (incumbent)	17,712	51.52
Republican	Michele Skinner	16,610	48.32
Write-in		55	0.16
Total votes		34,377	100.00
Democratic hold			

=== District 92 ===
Republican Treig Pronschinske was moved into the 29th district as a result of redistricting. Republican Clint Moses ran for re-election after being moved into this district as a result of redistricting. Two candidates filed for the Democratic nomination, former representative Joe Plouff and former member of the Chippewa County Board of Supervisors Caden Berg. In the primary the two candidates differed on issues such as the projected state surplus, with Plouff wanting to put funds towards gun safety initiatives and tax breaks, while Berg supported putting funds towards funding education. The two candidates also differed on the issue of trans rights, with Plouff wanting to leave the issue of trans women in sports up to individual school districts, while Berg opposed restricting trans women in sports. Plouff defeated Berg by a narrow 0.76% margin. Following the primary, Berg joined Plouff's campaign as his campaign manager. The district, while Republican-leaning was projected to be competitive and a tossup for either party. During the campaign, both candidates differed on major issues. On the issue of medicaid expansion, Moses opposed expanding Medicaid in the state, while Plouff supported it. The candidates also differed on the issue of rural childcare, with Moses supporting increased apprenticeship programs while Plouff wanted to increase spending. Moses defeated Plouff by a six-point margin.

District 92 Democratic primary
Party	Candidate	Votes	%
Democratic	Joe Plouff	3,113	50.34
Democratic	Caden Berg	3,066	49.58
Write-in		5	0.08
Total votes		6,184	100.0

District 92 general election
Party	Candidate	Votes	%
Republican	Clint Moses	17,009	53.25
Democratic	Joe Plouff	14,908	46.68
Write-in		22	0.07
Total votes		31,939	100.00
Republican hold			

=== District 93 ===
Precinct results: Phelps—50–60% Phelps—60–70% Phelps—70–80% Phelps—80–90% Butler—50–60% Butler—60–70% Butler—70–80% Butler—80–90% Butler—90–100% No votes

Incumbent Republican Warren Petryk declined to seek re-election, leaving this district open. Following his ouster from the UW-Board of Regents, former legislator Dana Wachs expressed interest in running in the redrawn district, however later declined to run on March 20. Three weeks later, educator and journalist Christian Phelps announced his bid for the nomination and was followed by author Nickolas Butler on May 20. Throughout the campaign the two candidates offered different priorities, with Phelps emphasizing education funding and Butler emphasizing expanding healthcare access. Phelps, a democratic socialist, also advocated for repealing Act 10. Both candidates touted their ability to build coalitions of voters and agreed on several standard liberal issues including legalizing marijuana and ending the state law banning abortion. Phelps defeated Butler by a three-point margin. He went on to defeat Republican James Rolbiecki in the general election, flipping the seat by a five-point margin.

District 93 Democratic primary
Party	Candidate	Votes	%
Democratic	Christian Phelps	4,580	51.74
Democratic	Nickolas Butler	4,267	48.20
Write-in		5	0.06
Total votes		8,852	100.0

Precinct results: Phelps—50–60% Phelps—60–70% Phelps—70–80% Rolbiecki—50–60% Rolbiecki—60–70% Rolbiecki—90–100% No votes

District 93 general election
Party	Candidate	Votes	%
Democratic	Christian Phelps	18,474	52.72
Republican	James Rolbiecki	16,527	47.16
Write-in		43	0.12
Total votes		35,044	100.0
Democratic gain from Republican			

=== District 94 ===
Incumbent Democrat Steve Doyle ran for re-election. In the general election Doyle narrowly defeated Republican Ryan Huebsch, an executive director of the Wisconsin Conservative Energy Forum, in a rematch of 2022.

During his tenure, Doyle has been described as the most bipartisan member of the Assembly, having authored the most bipartisan pieces of legislation of any member of his caucus. Huebsch previously ran for this district in 2022, and his father, Michael Huebsch, previously represented this district before resigning to join the cabinet of Scott Walker in 2011. Controversy emerged in the campaign when offensive social media posts Huebsch made as a teenager emerged, after which he apologized and took down the posts. This district's race had become the most expensive state assembly election in Wisconsin in 2024. Under the new maps, the district was broadly unchanged, remaining one of the most politically competitive districts in the state, being rated as a tossup with a slight Democratic lean.

District 94 general election
Party	Candidate	Votes	%
Democratic	Steve Doyle (incumbent)	18,436	50.29
Republican	Ryan Huebsch	18,219	49.70
Write-in		2	0.01
Total votes		36,657	100.0
Democratic hold			

=== District 95 ===
Incumbent Democrat Jill Billings ran for re-election. She defeated Republican Cedric Schnitzler.

District 95 general election
Party	Candidate	Votes	%
Democratic	Jill Billings (incumbent)	16,461	51.99
Republican	Cedric Schnitzler	15,191	47.98
Write-in		8	0.03
Total votes		31,660	100.00
Democratic hold			

=== District 96 ===
Incumbent Republican Loren Oldenburg ran for re-election. Retired non-profit executive Tara Johnson and businessman Steve Campbell both announced campaigns to unseat Oldenburg. During the Democratic Primary, the two candidates diverged on ideology, with Campbell describing himself as a moderate and Johnson being described as a progressive, while both touted their qualifications to represent the district. Both candidates also shared similar concerns about funding for public schools and support for abortion-access. Johnson defeated Campbell by a wide margin in the primary. The race between Oldenburg and Johnson became a test of the new maps, as despite the Democratic lean of the new district, Oldenburg was the incumbent and had a previous moderate record during his tenure. During the general election campaign, Johnson supported increased funding for public schools, expanding access to abortion, and expanding medicaid in the state. Oldenburg in his campaign for re-election continued his focus on agricultural issues. Johnson defeated Oldenburg in the general election by a two-point margin, flipping the seat.

District 96 Democratic primary
Party	Candidate	Votes	%
Democratic	Tara Johnson	6,391	74.14
Democratic	Steve Campbell	2,226	25.82
Write-in		3	0.04
Total votes		8,620	100.0

District 96 general election
Party	Candidate	Votes	%
Democratic	Tara Johnson	16,615	50.97
Republican	Loren Oldenburg (incumbent)	15,963	48.97
Write-in		17	0.06
Total votes		32,595	100.00
Democratic gain from Republican			

=== District 97 ===
Incumbent Republican Cindi Duchow ran for re-election, having been moved into this district from the 99th district due to redistricting. She defeated Democrat Beth Leonard by a wide margin.

District 97 general election
Party	Candidate	Votes	%
Republican	Cindi Duchow	29,443	70.94
Democratic	Beth Leonard	12,011	28.94
Write-in		51	0.12
Total votes		41,505	100.00
Republican hold			

=== District 98 ===
Incumbent Republican Adam Neylon was moved into the neighboring 15th district due to redistricting, leaving this district open. Jim Piwowarczyk defeated former state assembly member Don Pridemore in the Republican primary and Democrat Del Schmechel in the general election.

District 98 Republican primary
Party	Candidate	Votes	%
Republican	Jim Piwowarczyk	7,583	65.12
Republican	Don Pridemore	4,044	34.73
Write-in		18	0.15
Total votes		11,645	100.0

District 98 general election
Party	Candidate	Votes	%
Republican	Jim Piwowarczyk	28,823	71.08
Democratic	Del Schmechel	11,698	28.85
Write-in		30	0.07
Total votes		40,551	100.00
Republican hold			

=== District 99 ===
Incumbent Republican Cindi Duchow was moved into the neighboring 97th district due to redistricting. Fellow Republican Barbara Dittrich ran for re-election after being moved into the district due to redistricting. She defeated Hartland Village President Jeffrey Pfannerstill in the Republican primary and was unopposed in the general election.

District 99 Republican primary
Party	Candidate	Votes	%
Republican	Barbara Dittrich	6,621	62.89
Republican	Jeffrey Pfannerstill	3,894	36.99
Write-in		13	0.12
Total votes		10,528	100.0

District 99 general election
Party	Candidate	Votes	%
Republican	Barbara Dittrich	32,132	97.48
Write-in		830	2.52
Total votes		32,962	100.00
Republican hold			

== See also ==
- Redistricting in Wisconsin
  - Clarke v. Wisconsin Elections Commission
- 2024 Wisconsin elections
  - 2024 Wisconsin Senate election
- 2024 United States elections
- Elections in Wisconsin
- Wisconsin State Assembly
