= Joe Plouff =

American politician

Member of the Wisconsin State Assembly from the 29th district
- In office January 6, 1997 – January 3, 2005
- Preceded by: Alvin Baldus
- Succeeded by: Andy Lamb

Personal details
- Born: February 8, 1950 (age 76) De Pere, Wisconsin, U.S.
- Party: Democratic
- Spouses: Patricia Ellen Lee (m. 1971, divorced); Lavonne Solem
- Children: 3
- Education: University of Wisconsin–Eau Claire (B.S.); University of Wisconsin–Stout (M.S.)

Military service
- Allegiance: United States
- Branch/service: United States Army
- Years of service: 1970–1972
- Battles/wars: Vietnam War

Joseph Anthony Plouff (born February 8, 1950) is an American Democratic politician from Menomonie, Wisconsin. He served four terms in the Wisconsin State Assembly, representing the 29th Assembly district from 1997 to 2005. He also served one year on the City Council of Menomonie.

== Biography ==
Born in De Pere, Wisconsin, Plouff received his bachelor's degree from the University of Wisconsin–Eau Claire and his master's degree from the University of Wisconsin–Stout. Plouff also served in the United States Army. He served on the Menomonie, Wisconsin Common Council and the Dunn County, Wisconsin Board of Supervisors. Plouff served in the Wisconsin State Assembly from 1997 until 2005, when he was defeated for re-election in 2004.

Plouff was the Democratic nominee for the 92nd assembly district in 2024.

== Electoral history ==
=== Wisconsin Assembly, 29th district (1996–2004) ===
Year	Election	Date	Elected				Defeated				Total	Plurality
1996	Primary	Sep. 10	Joe Plouff	Democratic	929	42.54%	Lee Kellaher	Dem.	785	35.94%	2,184	144
1996	Primary	Sep. 10	Joe Plouff	Democratic	929	42.54%	Patrick J. Milliren	Dem.	256	11.72%	2,184	144
1996	Primary	Sep. 10	Joe Plouff	Democratic	929	42.54%	Mitchell W. Green	Dem.	214	9.80%	2,184	144
1996	General	Nov. 4	Joe Plouff	Democratic	9,954	50.40%	Jim Anderson	Rep.	9,797	49.60%	19,751	157
1998	General	Nov. 3	Joe Plouff (inc)	Democratic	7,615	53.82%	Sally Fitzgerald	Rep.	6,535	46.18%	14,150	1,080
2000	General	Nov. 7	Joe Plouff (inc)	Democratic	12,541	51.77%	Jeff Butler	Rep.	11,684	48.23%	24,225	857
2002	General	Nov. 5	Joe Plouff (inc)	Democratic	9,596	61.43%	Jon A. Hauser	Rep.	6,026	38.57%	15,622	3,570
2004	General	Nov. 2	Andy Lamb	Republican	16,001	50.35%	Joe Plouff (inc)	Dem.	14,577	45.87%	30,578	1,424
2004	General	Nov. 2	Andy Lamb	Republican	16,001	50.35%	Craig Mohn	Lib.	1,183	3.72%	30,578	1,424

=== Wisconsin Assembly, 92nd district (2024) ===
Year	Election	Date	Elected				Defeated				Total	Plurality
2024	Primary	Aug. 13	Joe Plouff	Democratic	3,113	50.34%	Caden G. Berg	Dem.	3,066	49.58%	6,184	47
2024	General	Nov. 5	Clint Moses	Republican	17,009	53.25%	Joe Plouff	Dem.	14,908	46.68%	31,939	2,101

Wisconsin State Assembly
Preceded by Alvin Baldus	Member of the Wisconsin State Assembly from the 29th district January 6, 1997 – January 3, 2005	Succeeded by Andy Lamb
