= Clint Moses =

American politician (born 1976)

Member of the Wisconsin State Assembly
- Incumbent
- Assumed office January 6, 2025
- Preceded by: Treig Pronschinske
- Constituency: 92nd district
- In office January 4, 2021 – January 6, 2025
- Preceded by: Rob Stafsholt
- Succeeded by: Treig Pronschinske
- Constituency: 29th district

Member of the Menomonie Area School Board
- In office April 22, 2019 – April 2022

Personal details
- Born: April 10, 1976 (age 50) Menomonie, Wisconsin, U.S.
- Party: Republican
- Spouse: Nora
- Children: 4
- Education: University of Wisconsin–Stout (B.A.); Northwestern College of Chiropractic (B.S., D.C.)
- Profession: Chiropractor
- Website: Campaign website

Clint Moses (born April 4, 1976) is an American chiropractor and Republican politician from Menomonie, Wisconsin. He is a member of the Wisconsin State Assembly, representing Wisconsin's 92nd Assembly district since 2025; he previously represented the 29th Assembly district from 2021 to 2025.

== Early life and education ==
Clint Moses was born in the city of Menomonie, Wisconsin, and was raised on his family's farm in the neighboring town of Menomonie, where he still resides. He was a Boy Scout throughout his childhood and attained the rank of Eagle Scout. While still in high school, he started a lawncare business to earn money for college. After graduating from Menomonie High School, he was able to fund his education at University of Wisconsin–Stout, where he double-majored in human biology and psychology. He went on from there to earn his doctorate in chiropractic from Northwestern College of Chiropractic. In 2003, he opened Red Cedar Chiropractic with his wife, Nora.

Moses has been heavily involved as a member of the Community Foundation of Dunn County, previously serving as grants chair and board president.

== Political career ==
In April 2019, Moses obtained his first public office when he was elected to a three-year term on the Menomonie Area School Board.

In November 2019, incumbent representative Rob Stafsholt announced he would forego re-election, instead attempting a run for Wisconsin State Senate. In April 2020, Moses announced he would be a candidate in the Republican primary to replace Shafsholt in the Wisconsin State Assembly.

Moses faced two competitors in the Republican primary, Neil Kline and Ryan Sherley, both of New Richmond. In his campaign announcement, Moses emphasized an interest in affordable access to health care, preserving the environment, and ensuring his region of the state got its fair share of funding for roads and schools. Although acknowledging the COVID-19 pandemic in his announcement, as the pandemic wore on into the summer, Moses shifted his messaging more towards that issue. Citing concerns about unemployment, the school system, and mental health in the midst of the pandemic, he came out adamantly opposed to additional lockdowns or business restrictions. Moses won the primary with 38% of the vote and went on to defeat Democrat John Rocco Calabrese in the general election.

== Personal life and family ==
Clint Moses and his wife Nora reside on their family farm in the town of Menomonie, where they raise sheep and cattle. They have four daughters.

After serving in the Boy Scouts as a child, he has worked in leadership roles in the local Tall Oaks Boy Scouts council. He has also served on the Colfax Health & Rehabilitation board, and has been a member and past president of the Menomonie Rotary Club.

== Electoral history ==
=== Menomonie Area School Board (2019) ===
| Year | Election | Date | Elected | | | | Defeated | | | | Total | Plurality |
|---|---|---|---|---|---|---|---|---|---|---|---|---|
| 2019 | General | Apr. 2 | Clint Moses | Nonpartisan | 2,104 | 20.74% | Nell Heifner-Johnson | Non. | 1,897 | 18.70% | 10,145 | 5 |
| 2019 | General | Apr. 2 | David Styer (inc) | Nonpartisan | 2,099 | 20.69% | Bayard Godsave | Non. | 1,208 | 11.91% | 10,145 | 5 |
| 2019 | General | Apr. 2 | Chris Freeman | Nonpartisan | 1,914 | 18.87% | Urs Haltinner | Non. | 923 | 9.10% | 10,145 | 5 |

=== Wisconsin Assembly, 29th district (2020, 2022) ===
| Year | Election | Date | Elected | | | | Defeated | | | | Total | Plurality |
|---|---|---|---|---|---|---|---|---|---|---|---|---|
| 2020 | Primary | Aug. 11 | Clint Moses | Republican | 2,355 | 38.21% | Neil R. Kline | Rep. | 1,998 | 32.41% | 6,164 | 357 |
| 2020 | Primary | Aug. 11 | Clint Moses | Republican | 2,355 | 38.21% | Ryan Sherley | Rep. | 1,807 | 29.32% | 6,164 | 357 |
| 2020 | General | Nov. 3 | Clint Moses | Republican | 18,961 | 60.23% | John Rocco Calabrese | Dem. | 12,509 | 39.73% | 31,483 | 6,452 |
| 2022 | General | Nov. 8 | Clint Moses (inc) | Republican | 14,321 | 60.05% | Danielle Johnson | Dem. | 9,523 | 39.93% | 23,848 | 4,798 |

=== Wisconsin Assembly, 92nd district (2024, 2026) ===
| Year | Election | Date | Elected | | | | Defeated | | | | Total | Plurality |
|---|---|---|---|---|---|---|---|---|---|---|---|---|
| 2024 | General | Nov. 5 | Clint Moses | Republican | 17,009 | 53.25% | Joe Plouff | Dem. | 14,908 | 46.68% | 31,939 | 2,101 |

Wisconsin State Assembly
| Preceded by Rob Stafsholt | Member of the Wisconsin State Assembly from the 29th district January 4, 2021 – January 6, 2025 | Succeeded by Treig Pronschinske |
| Preceded by Treig Pronschinske | Member of the Wisconsin State Assembly from the 92nd district January 6, 2025 – present | Incumbent |
