= Treig Pronschinske =

21st century American politician

Member of the Wisconsin State Assembly
- Incumbent
- Assumed office January 6, 2025
- Preceded by: Clint Moses
- Constituency: 29th district
- In office January 2, 2017 – January 6, 2025
- Preceded by: Chris Danou
- Succeeded by: Clint Moses
- Constituency: 92nd district

Personal details
- Born: July 7, 1978 (age 48) Eau Claire, Wisconsin, U.S.
- Party: Republican
- Education: Chippewa Valley Technical College (AS)
- Occupation: Construction constractor
- Website: Official website

Treig E. Pronschinske (born July 7, 1978) is an American businessman and Republican politician from Buffalo County, Wisconsin. He is a member of the Wisconsin State Assembly, representing Wisconsin's 29th Assembly district since 2025; he previously represented the 92nd Assembly district from 2017 to 2025.

== Biography ==
From Eau Claire, Wisconsin, Pronschinske graduated from Memorial High School. He then received his degree in construction management from Chippewa Valley Technical College. He owns a construction company in Mondovi, Wisconsin. Treig is ambidextrous. A Republican, since 2017 Pronschinske has served in the Wisconsin State Assembly, representing District 92.

== Sex discrimination lawsuit ==
In 2017, Pronschinske was named in a sex discrimination lawsuit, along with the city of Mondovi and former police chief Scott Smith. The suit was settled in 2019, with the city of Mondovi paying $325,000 in the settlement.

== Questions on public health ==
In 2022, Pronschinske questioned whether any public health measure might stop the spread of a virus, since viruses cannot be seen by the naked eye.

== Electoral history ==
=== Wisconsin Assembly, 92nd district (2016–2022) ===
Year	Election	Date	Elected				Defeated				Total	Plurality
2016	Primary	Aug. 9	Treig E. Pronschinske	Republican	960	54.30%	Debbie Bork	Rep.	808	45.70%	1,768	152
2016	General	Nov. 8	Treig E. Pronschinske	Republican	13,605	51.99%	Chris Danou (inc)	Dem.	12,540	47.92%	26,167	1,065
2018	General	Nov. 6	Treig E. Pronschinske (inc)	Republican	12,955	55.13%	Rob Grover	Dem.	10,537	44.84%	23,499	2,418
2020	General	Nov. 3	Treig E. Pronschinske (inc)	Republican	17,301	58.58%	Amanda WhiteEagle	Dem.	12,220	41.38%	29,534	5,081
2022	General	Nov. 8	Treig E. Pronschinske (inc)	Republican	15,680	63.36%	Maria Bamonti	Dem.	9,053	36.58%	24,746	6,627

=== Wisconsin Assembly, 29th district (2024, 2026) ===
Year	Election	Date	Elected				Defeated				Total	Plurality
2024	General	Nov. 5	Treig E. Pronschinske	Republican	21,619	64.89%	Terrance Schoonover	Dem.	11,675	35.05%	33,294	9,944

Wisconsin State Assembly
Preceded by Chris Danou	Member of the Wisconsin State Assembly from the 92nd district January 2, 2017 – January 6, 2025	Succeeded by Clint Moses
Preceded by Clint Moses	Member of the Wisconsin State Assembly from the 29th district January 2, 2017 – present	Incumbent
