= Andy Lamb =

American politician (born 1973)

Andy Lamb (born September 7, 1973) is an American Republican politician from Wisconsin.

Born in Dunn County, Wisconsin, Lamb graduated from Spring Valley High School and went to University of Wisconsin–Eau Claire. He was a farmer/consultant and auto sales manager. Lamb served one term in the Wisconsin State Assembly in 2005 and was a Republican. He did not seek re-election in 2006 and returned to auto sales.
