= Wisconsin's 92nd Assembly district =

Legislative district in Wisconsin, United States

Wisconsin's 92nd State Assembly district
- 2024 map defined in 2023 Wisc. Act 94; 2022 map defined in Johnson v. Wisconsin Elections Commission; 2011 map was defined in 2011 Wisc. Act 43
Assemblymember
Clint Moses; R–Menomonie
since January 6, 2025 (1 years)
- Demographics: 88.6% White; 0.6% Black; 8.0% Hispanic; 0.6% Asian; 1.2% Native American; 0.0% Hawaiian/Pacific Islander; 0.9% Other; 0.2% Multiracial
- Population (2020) • Voting age: 59,524; 45,405
- Website: Official website
- Notes: Western Wisconsin

The 92nd Assembly district of Wisconsin is one of 99 districts in the Wisconsin State Assembly. Located in western Wisconsin, the district comprises parts of southwest Chippewa County and central Dunn County. It includes the cities of Chippewa Falls and Menomonie and the parts of Eau Claire which fall in Chippewa County, along with the villages of Elk Mound and Lake Hallie. The district is represented by Republican Clint Moses, since January 2025; Moses previously represented the 29th district from 2021 to 2025.

The 92nd Assembly district is located within Wisconsin's 31st Senate district, along with the 91st and 93rd Assembly districts.

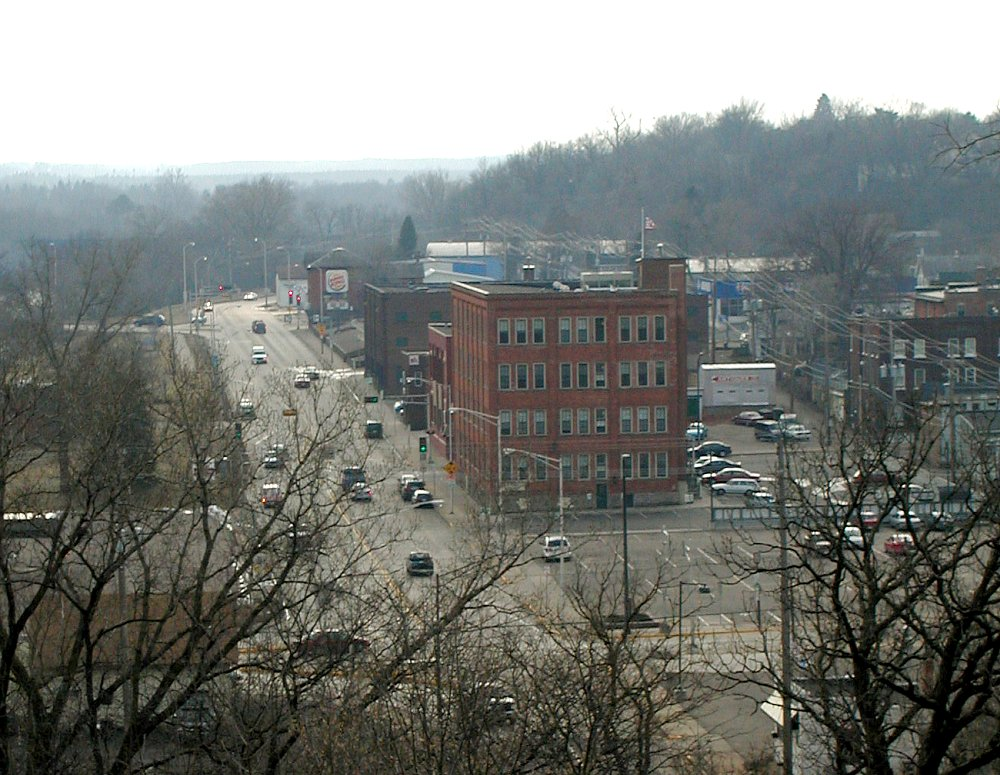
Downtown Chippewa Falls

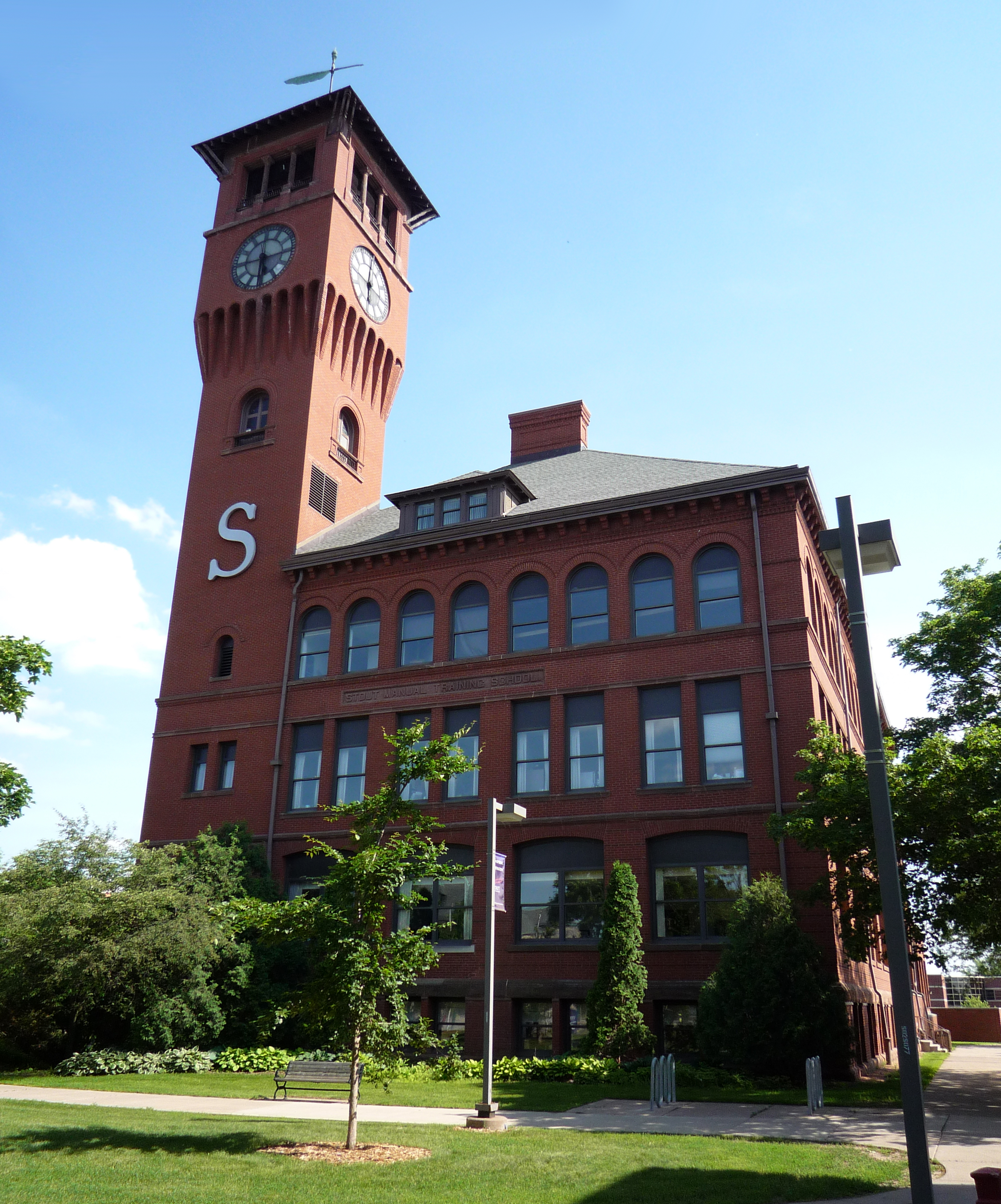
Bowman Hall on the UW–Stout campus

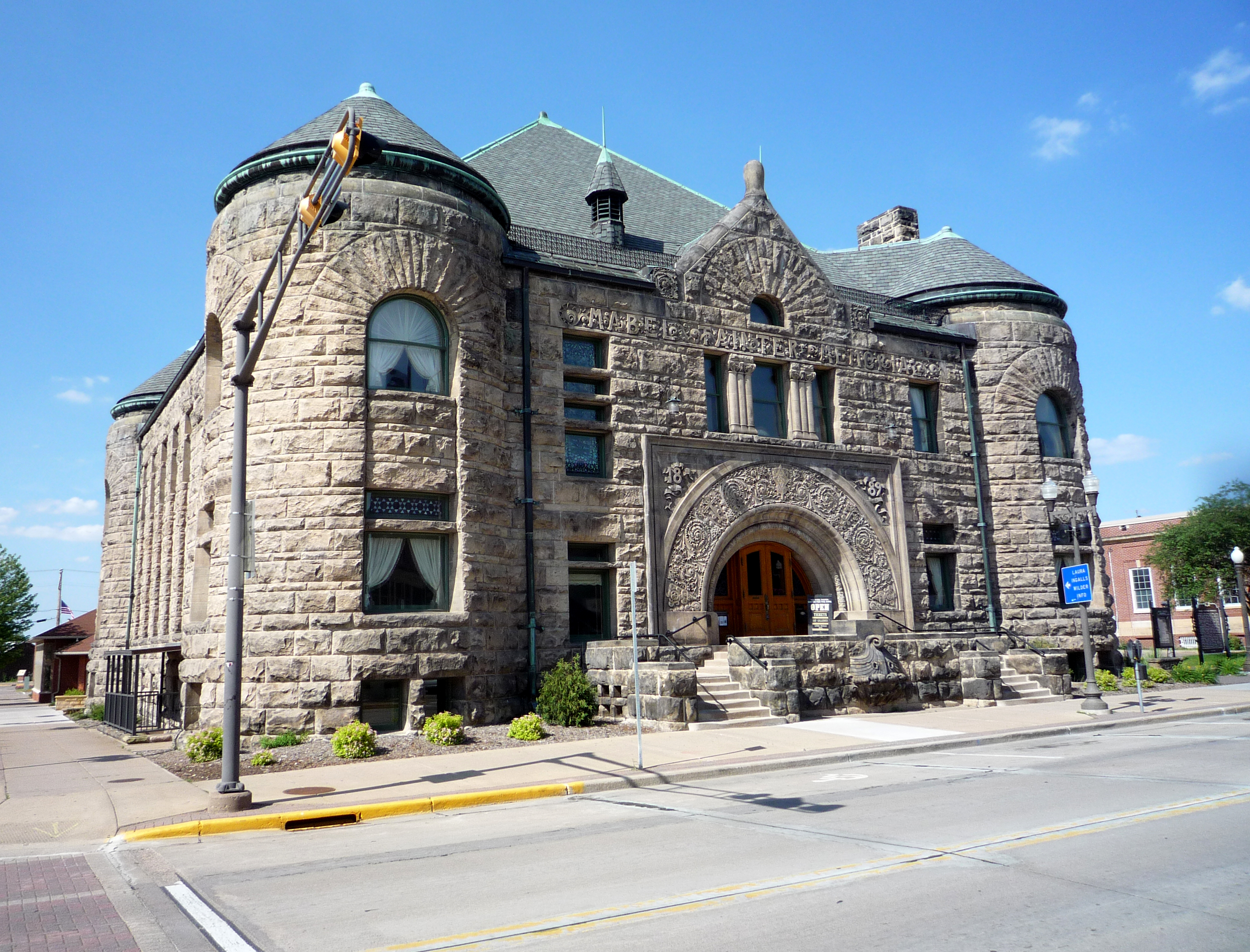
Mabel Tainter Memorial Building in Menomonie

== History ==
The district was created in the 1972 redistricting act (1971 Wisc. Act 304) which first established the numbered district system, replacing the previous system which allocated districts to specific counties. Under the 1972 plan, the core of the new 92nd district was Monroe County, which was its own district under the previous maps. The district contained nearly all of Monroe County, but stretched east into central Juneau County and north through all of eastern Jackson County and parts of southern Clark County. The last representative of the Monroe County district, Robert Quackenbush, was elected in 1972 as the first representative of the 92nd Assembly district.

Under the 1982 court-ordered redistricting plan, the district was briefly moved to central Wisconsin, comprising all of Columbia County and parts of eastern Sauk County and western Dodge County. The 1983 redistricting act brought the 92nd back to its previous location with a different configuration, making Jackson County the core of the district and including the northern half of Monroe County and parts of southwest Clark County and northeast Eau Claire County. The 1992 court-ordered redistricting plan shifted the district south again, restoring most of Monroe County to the district, while keeping most of Jackson County and part of southeast Eau Claire County. The 2002 court-ordered redistricting plan shifted north again, removing the southern half of Monroe County, expanding into more of southeastern Eau Claire County, and adding back part of southern Clark County. The 2011 redistricting act (2011 Wisc. Act 43) removed all of Monroe County and shifted the district west, comprising central and western Jackson County along with most of Trempealeau and Buffalo counties. This configuration was mostly preserved in the 2022 court-ordered redistricting, which removed central Jackson County, added the rest of Buffalo and Trempealeau counties, and added parts of Pepin County and southern Eau Claire County.

The 2024 redistricting (2023 Wisc. Act 94) moved the district to Dunn and Chippewa County, comprising the cities of Menomonie and Chippewa Falls, and part of the north side of the city of Eau Claire. Under the new map configuration, the 92nd Assembly district is projected to be one of the most competitive districts in the state legislature.

== List of past representatives ==
List of representatives to the Wisconsin State Assembly from the 92nd district
Member	Party	Residence	Counties represented	Term start	Term end	Ref.
District created
Robert L. Quackenbush	Rep.	Sparta	Clark, Jackson, Juneau, Monroe	January 1, 1973	January 3, 1983	
Robert M. Thompson	Dem.	Poynette	Columbia, Dodge, Sauk	January 3, 1983	January 7, 1985	
Terry Musser	Rep.	Black River Falls	Clark, Eau Claire, Jackson, Monroe	January 7, 1985	January 5, 2009	
Terry Musser	Rep.	Black River Falls	Eau Claire, Jackson, La Crosse, Monroe	January 7, 1985	January 5, 2009	
Terry Musser	Rep.	Black River Falls	Clark, Eau Claire, Jackson, Monroe	January 7, 1985	January 5, 2009	
Mark A. Radcliffe	Dem.	Black River Falls	Clark, Eau Claire, Jackson, Monroe	January 5, 2009	January 7, 2013	
Chris Danou	Dem.	Trempealeau	Buffalo, Jackson, Trempealeau	January 7, 2013	January 2, 2017	
Treig Pronschinske	Rep.	Mondovi	Buffalo, Jackson, Trempealeau	January 2, 2017	January 6, 2025	
Treig Pronschinske	Rep.	Mondovi	Buffalo, Eau Claire, Jackson, Pepin, Trempealeau	January 2, 2017	January 6, 2025	
Clint Moses	Rep.	Menomonie	Chippewa, Dunn	January 6, 2025	Current	
