= Joseph Czarnezki =

American politician and public administrator

Member of the Wisconsin Elections Commission
- In office May 1, 2023 – October 17, 2023
- Appointed by: Tony Evers
- Preceded by: Julie Glancey
- Succeeded by: Carrie Riepl

County Clerk of Milwaukee County, Wisconsin
- In office January 5, 2009 – January 2, 2017
- Preceded by: Mark Ryan
- Succeeded by: George L. Christenson

Member of the Wisconsin Senate from the 8th district
- In office April 13, 1983 – January 4, 1993
- Preceded by: James Flynn
- Succeeded by: Alberta Darling

Member of the Wisconsin State Assembly
- In office January 3, 1983 – April 13, 1983
- Preceded by: Annette Polly Williams
- Succeeded by: Peggy Krusick
- Constituency: 17th Assembly district
- In office January 5, 1981 – January 3, 1983
- Preceded by: Kevin Soucie
- Succeeded by: Thomas Seery
- Constituency: 7th Assembly district

Personal details
- Born: September 27, 1954 (age 71) Milwaukee, Wisconsin, U.S.
- Party: Democratic
- Education: University of Wisconsin–Milwaukee

Joseph J. Czarnezki (born September 27, 1954) is an American politician and public administrator from Milwaukee, Wisconsin. He served briefly as a member of the Wisconsin Elections Commission, appointed by Governor Tony Evers in May 2023, his appointment was rejected by the Wisconsin Senate in October 2023, due to a controversy over the reappointment of state elections administrator Meagan Wolfe. Czarnezki previously served ten years in the Wisconsin Senate and two years in the State Assembly, representing western Milwaukee County. He also led several city departments under Milwaukee mayor John O. Norquist, served eight years as county clerk, and was a member of the Milwaukee County board of supervisors.

== Life and career ==
Born in Milwaukee, Wisconsin, Czarnezki graduated from University of Wisconsin–Milwaukee. In 1980 he was elected to the 7th district of the Wisconsin State Assembly as a Democrat, serving until 1983. From 1983 to 1993, he was a member of the Wisconsin State Senate. Czarnezki was an unsuccessful candidate for Milwaukee County Executive in 1992, losing to F. Thomas Ament. Czarnezki subsequently served in various positions in the administration of Milwaukee Mayor John O. Norquist, including deputy director of administration, health commissioner, director of intergovernmental affairs, executive director of the Milwaukee Fire and Police Commission, and city budget director.

In 2008, Czarnezki was elected County Clerk of Milwaukee County, Wisconsin. In 2012, Czarnezki was reelected county clerk without opposition. Czarnezki did not seek reelection in 2016.

In 2020, Czarnezki was elected to the Milwaukee County Board of Supervisors, representing the 11th supervisory district in the southwestern portion of the county.

=== Wisconsin Elections Commission (2023) ===
In May 2023, Czarnezky was appointed to the Wisconsin Elections Commission by Governor Tony Evers, replacing Julie Glancey, who stepped down before the end of her term. His appointment coincided with a period of intense turmoil at the elections commission, due to lingering Republican complaints about the 2020 election. Shortly after his appointment, the commission was set to vote on the reappointment of elections administrator Meagan Wolfe. Democrats on the commission abstained from the vote, to allow Wolfe to remain in office by default, adhering to the rule set in the recent Wisconsin Supreme Court case of State ex rel. Kaul v. Prehn. After legal wrangling, Republicans in the state senate acknowledged that they did not have the power to remove Wolfe through the confirmation process, but they took out their frustration on Czarnezky, rejecting his appointment to the commission on October 17, 2023.

== Electoral history ==
=== Wisconsin Assembly, 7th district (1980) ===
Wisconsin Assembly, 7th District Election, 1980
Party	Candidate	Votes	%	±%
Democratic Primary, September 9, 1980
Democratic	Joseph Czarnezki	1,503	35.76%	
Democratic	Peggy Krusick	1,020	24.27%	
Democratic	Bruce R. Bailey	853	20.30%	
Democratic	Joseph R. Krupa	827	19.68%	
Plurality		483	11.49%	
Total votes		4,203	100.0%	
General Election, November 4, 1980
Democratic	Joseph Czarnezki	13,430	70.26%	+4.75%
Republican	Craig S. Rendahl	5,817	29.74%	
Plurality		7,923	40.51%	+9.50%
Total votes		19,557	100.0%	+35.87%
Democratic hold				

=== Wisconsin Assembly, 17th district (1982) ===
Wisconsin Assembly, 17th District Election, 1982
Party	Candidate	Votes	%	±%
Democratic Primary, September 14, 1982
Democratic	Joseph Czarnezki	4,634	56.02%	
Democratic	Peggy Krusick	3,150	38.08%	
Democratic	Joseph Kaczynski	488	5.90%	
Plurality		1,484	17.94%	
Total votes		8,272	100.0%	
General Election, November 2, 1982
Democratic	Joseph Czarnezki	13,430	76.04%	
Republican	Robert G. Donovan	4,232	23.96%	
Plurality		9,198	52.08%	
Total votes		17,662	100.0%	
Democratic hold				

=== Wisconsin Senate (1983, 1984, 1988) ===
Wisconsin Senate, 8th District Special Election, 1983
Party	Candidate	Votes	%	±%
Special Democratic Primary, September 14, 1982
Democratic	Joseph Czarnezki	6,400	62.47%	
Democratic	Thomas A. Hauke	3,544	34.59%	
Democratic	Roman R. Blenski	301	2.94%	
Plurality		2,856	27.88%	
Total votes		10,245	100.0%	
Special Election, April 5, 1983
Democratic	Joseph Czarnezki	11,268	76.04%	+15.90%
Republican	Kevin M. Soczka	2,462	17.93%	
Plurality		8,806	64.14%	+31.80%
Total votes		13,730	100.0%	-77.46%
Democratic hold				

Wisconsin Senate, 8th District Election, 1984
Party	Candidate	Votes	%	±%
General Election, November 6, 1984
Democratic	Joseph Czarnezki (incumbent)	51,237	100.0%	
Total votes		51,237	100.0%	+273.18%
Democratic hold				

Wisconsin Senate, 8th District Election, 1988
Party	Candidate	Votes	%	±%
General Election, November 8, 1988
Democratic	Joseph Czarnezki (incumbent)	50,491	100.0%	
Total votes		50,491	100.0%	-1.46%
Democratic hold				

Wisconsin State Assembly
Preceded by Kevin Soucie	Member of the Wisconsin State Assembly from the 7th district January 5, 1981 – January 3, 1983	Succeeded by Thomas Seery
Preceded by Annette Polly Williams	Member of the Wisconsin State Assembly from the 17th district January 3, 1983 – April 13, 1983	Succeeded by Peggy Krusick
Wisconsin Senate
Preceded by James Flynn	Member of the Wisconsin Senate from the 8th district April 13, 1983 – January 4, 1993	Succeeded by Alberta Darling
Political offices
Preceded by Mark Ryan	County Clerk of Milwaukee County, Wisconsin; January 5, 2009 – January 2, 2017	Succeeded by George L. Christenson
Government offices
Preceded by Julie Glancey	Member of the Wisconsin Elections Commission; May 1, 2023 – present	Incumbent
