= Wisconsin's 7th Assembly district =

American legislative district in Milwaukee County, Wisconsin

Wisconsin's 7th State Assembly district
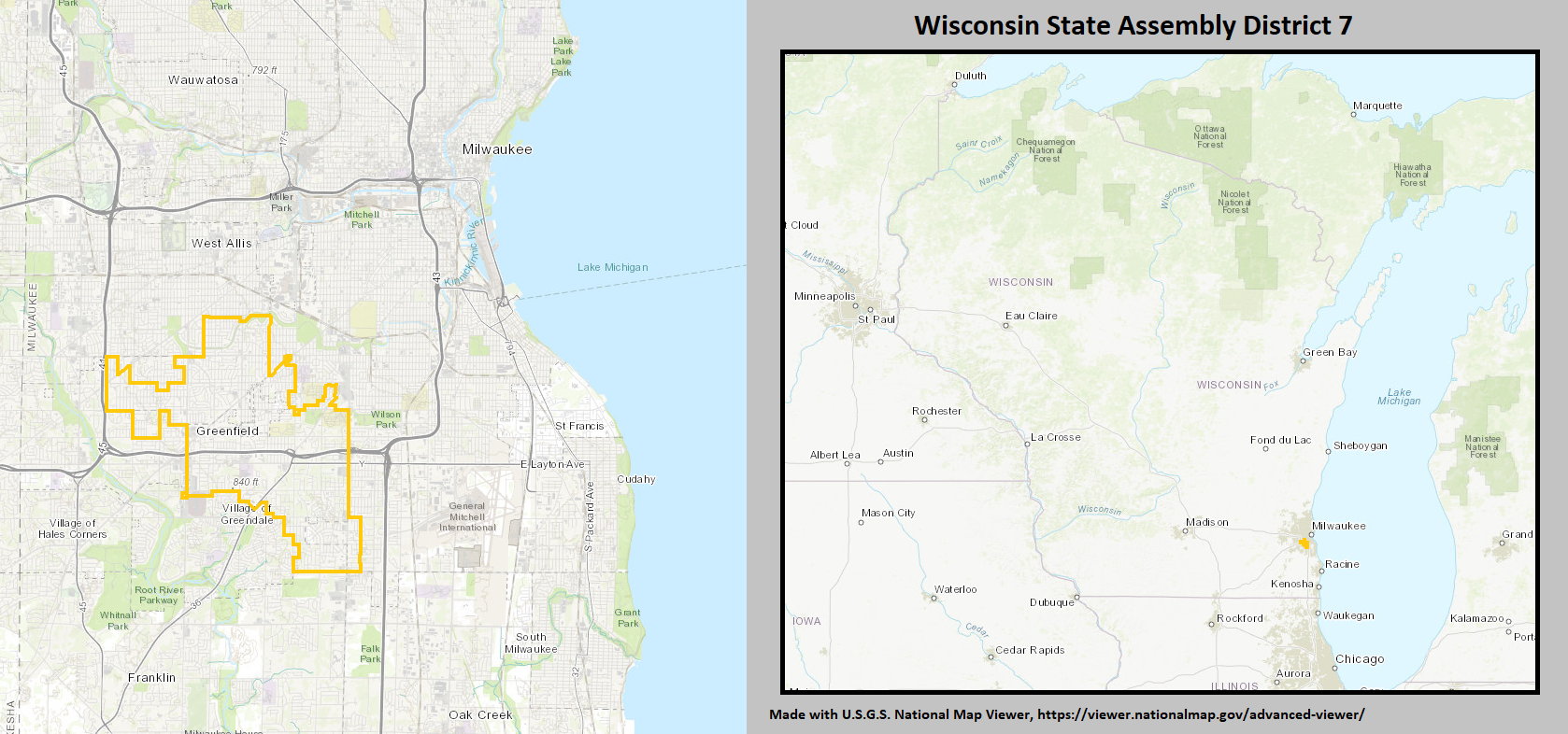
- 2024 map defined in 2023 Wisc. Act 94; 2022 map defined in Johnson v. Wisconsin Elections Commission; 2011 map was defined in 2011 Wisc. Act 43; 2002 map was defined in Baumgart v. Wendelberger
Assemblymember
Karen Kirsch; D–Greenfield
since January 6, 2025 (1 years)
- Demographics: 65.66% White; 7.14% Black; 20.01% Hispanic; 5.46% Asian; 2.88% Native American; 0.14% Hawaiian/Pacific Islander
- Population (2020) • Voting age: 59,100; 46,041
- Website: Official website
- Notes: Central Milwaukee County

The 7th Assembly district of Wisconsin is one of 99 districts in the Wisconsin State Assembly. Located in southeast Wisconsin, the district comprises part of central Milwaukee County, including parts of the cities of Milwaukee, West Allis, and Greenfield. The district also contains Alverno College, Calvary Cemetery, Mount Olivet Cemetery, and American Family Field, home of the Milwaukee Brewers. The district is represented by Democrat Karen Kirsch, since January 2025.

The 7th Assembly district is located within Wisconsin's 3rd Senate district, along with the 8th and 9th Assembly districts.

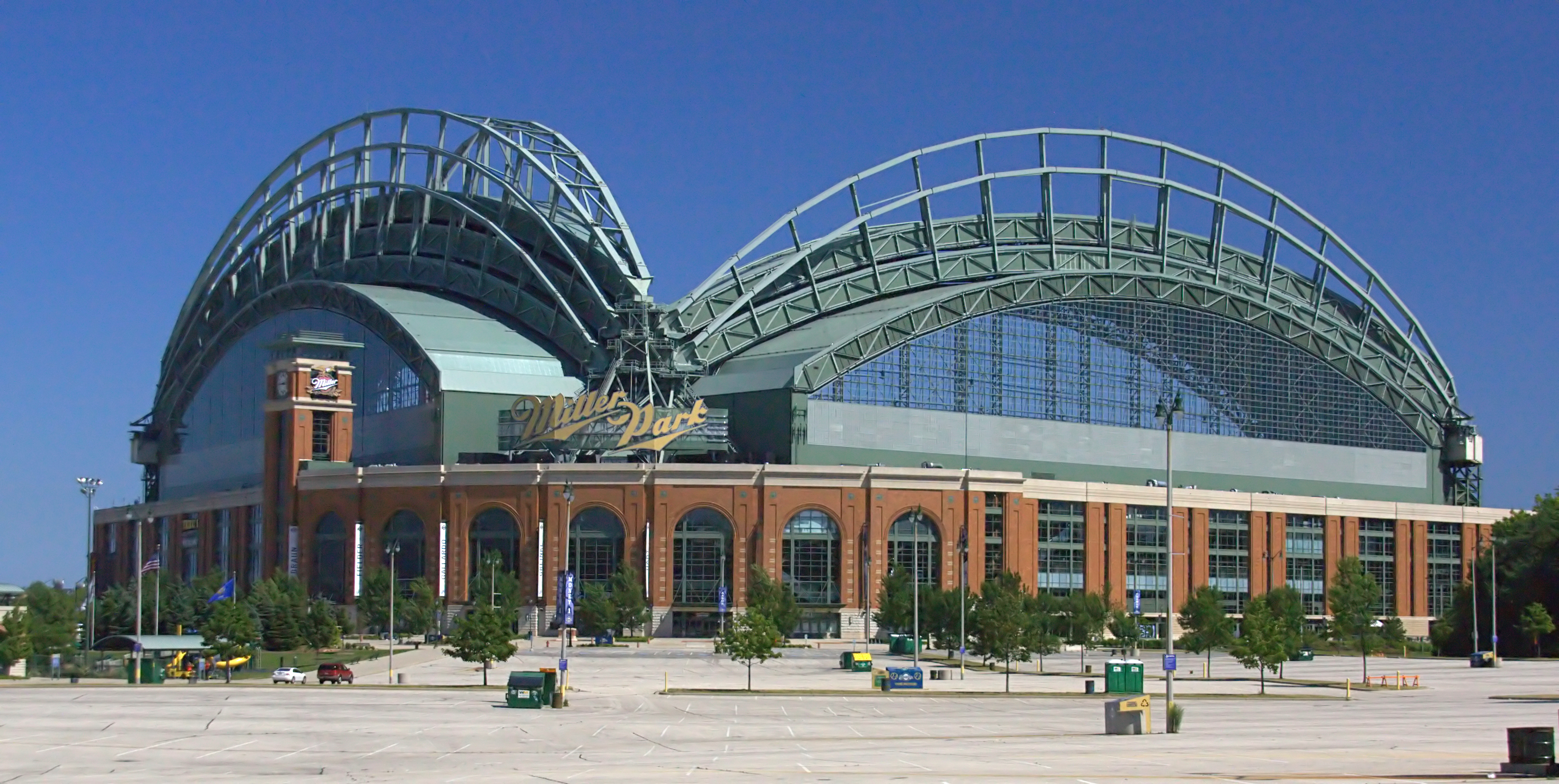
American Family Field

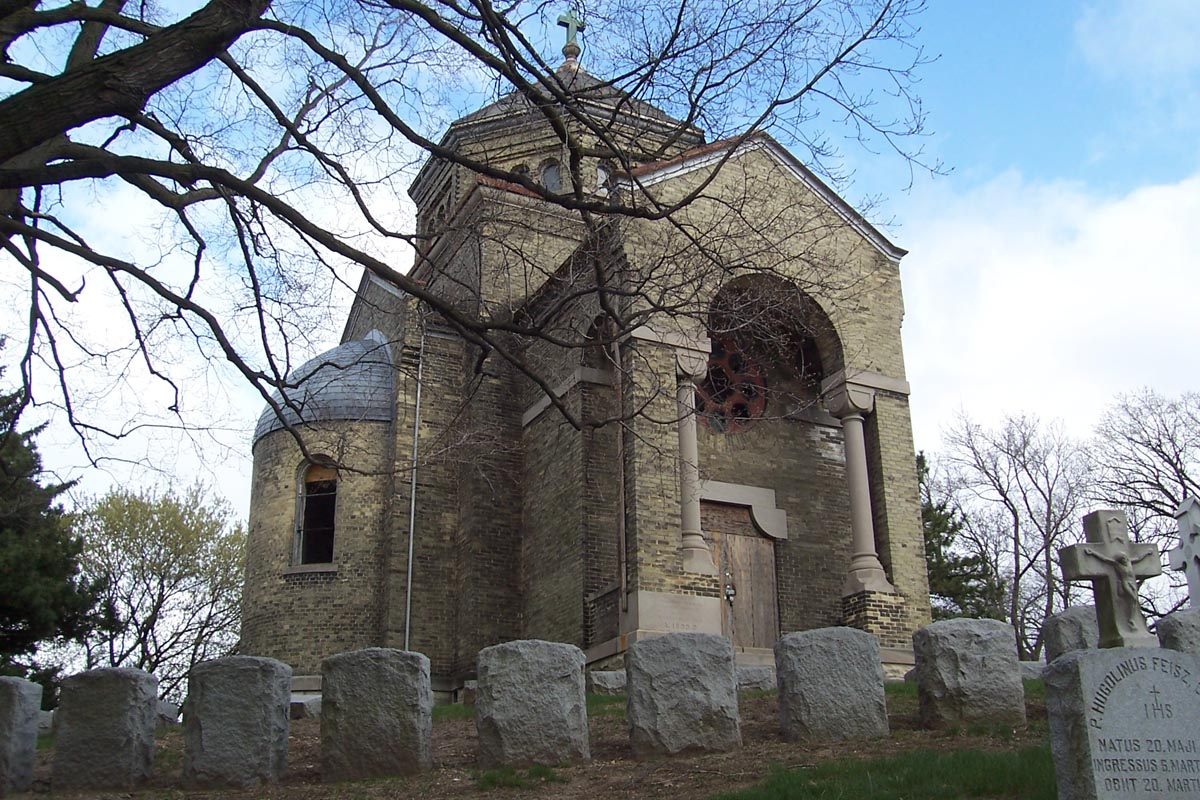
Chapel hill in Calvary Cemetery

== List of past representatives ==
List of representatives to the Wisconsin State Assembly from the 7th district
Member	Party	Residence	Counties represented	Term start	Term end	Ref.
District created
Raymond J. Tobiasz	Dem.	Milwaukee	Milwaukee County	January 1, 1973	January 6, 1975	
Kevin Soucie	Dem.	Milwaukee	Milwaukee County	January 6, 1975	January 3, 1981	
Joseph Czarnezki	Dem.	Milwaukee	Milwaukee County	January 3, 1981	January 3, 1983	
Thomas Seery	Dem.	Milwaukee	Milwaukee County	January 3, 1983	January 7, 1985	
Dismas Becker	Dem.	Milwaukee	Milwaukee County	January 7, 1985	January 3, 1989	
Gwen Moore	Dem.	Milwaukee	Milwaukee County	January 3, 1989	January 4, 1993	
Peter Bock	Dem.	Milwaukee	Milwaukee County	January 4, 1993	January 6, 2003	
Peggy Krusick	Dem.	Milwaukee	Milwaukee County	January 6, 2003	January 7, 2013	
Daniel Riemer	Dem.	Milwaukee	Milwaukee County	January 7, 2013	January 6, 2025	
Karen Kirsch	Dem.	Greenfield	Milwaukee County	January 6, 2025	Current	

== Electoral history ==
Year	Date	Elected				Defeated				Total	Plurality	Other primary candidates
2012	Nov. 6	Daniel Riemer	Democratic	16,664	85.35%	Peggy Krusick (inc, write-in)	Dem.	2,499	12.80%	19,524	14,165	Peggy Krusick (Dem.) (inc)
2012	Nov. 6	Daniel Riemer	Democratic	16,664	85.35%	Tiffany Lee Koehler (write-in)	Ind.	2	0.01%	19,524	14,165	Peggy Krusick (Dem.) (inc)
2014	Nov. 4	Daniel Riemer (inc)	Democratic	11,065	55.52%	Scott Espeseth	Rep.	8,800	44.16%	19,928	2,265	
2016	Nov. 8	Daniel Riemer (inc)	Democratic	13,514	56.14%	Zachary Marshall	Rep.	9,212	38.27%	24,073	4,302	
2016	Nov. 8	Daniel Riemer (inc)	Democratic	13,514	56.14%	Matthew J. Bughman	Lib.	1,303	5.41%	24,073	4,302	
2018	Nov. 6	Daniel Riemer (inc)	Democratic	15,187	78.28%	Matthew J. Bughman	Lib.	3,953	20.38%	19,400	11,234	
2020	Nov. 3	Daniel Riemer (inc)	Democratic	19,431	97.11%	--unopposed--				20,009	18,853	
2022	Nov. 3	Daniel Riemer (inc)	Democratic	12,476	61.81%	Zachary Marshall	Rep.	7,690	38.10%	20,185	4,786	
2024	Nov. 5	Karen Kirsch	Democratic	16,014	58.49%	Lee Whiting	Rep.	11,289	41.24%	27,377	4,725	
