= Wisconsin Elections Commission =

Wisconsin state commission charged with administering and enforcing election laws

Agency overview
- Formed: June 30, 2016; 10 years ago
- Preceding agencies: Wisconsin Government Accountability Board (2008–2016); Wisconsin Elections Board (1973–2008)
- Headquarters: 201 W Washington Ave, Second Floor Madison, Wisconsin, U.S.; 43°4′21.965″N 89°23′10.705″W
- Employees: 25.75 (2019)
- Annual budget: $8,974,800 (2019)
- Agency executives: Ann S. Jacobs, Chair; Mark L. Thomsen, Vice Chair; Meagan Wolfe, Administrator
- Website: elections.wi.gov

The Wisconsin Elections Commission is a bipartisan regulatory agency of the state of Wisconsin established to administer and enforce election laws in the state. The Wisconsin Elections Commission was established by a 2015 act of the Wisconsin Legislature which also established the Wisconsin Ethics Commission to administer campaign finance, ethics, and lobbying laws. The two commissions began operation on June 30, 2016, replacing the Wisconsin Government Accountability Board (GAB), which was abolished.

The Government Accountability Board had been established in 2008 to replace the Wisconsin Elections Board and Wisconsin Ethics Board.

== Leadership ==
=== Commissioners ===
The commission is made up of six members, two of which are appointed by the governor, and one each by the Senate majority leader, the Senate minority leader, the speaker of the Assembly, and the Assembly minority leader. The system is designed so that Republicans and Democrats each have three appointees on the commission.

=== Administrator ===
The staff of the commission are non-partisan, and are led by an administrator appointed by the commission and confirmed by the Wisconsin Senate. Meagan Wolfe was appointed interim administrator March 2, 2018, and was unanimously confirmed by the Wisconsin Senate on May 15, 2019, for a term ending June 30, 2023. With Wolfe's term set to expire, a commission vote to reappoint her deadlocked on June 27, 2023, meaning that she will likely continue serving as acting administrator for the foreseeable future. Although the three Democrats on the commission do not object to her reappointment, they voted against her reappointment because it prevents the nomination from going to the State Senate, which almost certainly would have voted down her reappointment and therefore required her to leave office.

=== Current commissioners ===
| Position | Name | Hometown | Term ends (Note: Terms end on May 1.) | Party | Appointer | |
| Position | Name | Hometown | Term ends | Party | Position | Name |
|---|---|---|---|---|---|---|
| Chair | Ann S. Jacobs | Milwaukee | 2026 | Dem. | Senate Minority Leader | Janet Bewley |
| Vice Chair | Mark L. Thomsen | Milwaukee | 2029 | Dem. | Assembly Minority Leader | Greta Neubauer |
| Commissioner (Clerk Member) | Carrie Riepl | Menomonie | 2026 | Dem. | Governor | Tony Evers |
| Commissioner | Don M. Millis | Sun Prairie | 2024 | Rep. | Assembly Speaker | Robin Vos |
| Commissioner | Robert F. Spindell Jr. | Milwaukee | 2026 | Rep. | Senate Majority Leader | Devin LeMahieu |
| Commissioner | Marge Bostelmann | Green Lake | 2024 | Rep. | Governor | Tony Evers |

== Brief History Overview ==
Before the creation of the Wisconsin Elections Commission, the Wisconsin Government Accountability Board (WGA) served as an independent regulatory board of six elected retired judges, with a similar purpose of ensuring that the Wisconsin law was upheld for political campaigns in the State of Wisconsin in a nonpartisan structure. Specifically, ensuring direct oversight of the legal enforcement of campaign finances, ethics, and lobbying laws.

The dissolution of this board stems from a disconnect with the Republican Party, as many within it believed they were unjustly targeted by the board. This tension became especially pronounced during investigations related to the campaigns of Wisconsin Governor Scott Walker, which intensified republican criticism of the board's actions- accusing the board of being unable to maintain neutrality by both Governor Walker and his supporters. As a result, political pressure mounted to restructure the state's oversight system, ultimately leading to the board's replacement.

The primary controversy that led to the dissolution of the WGA is often cited to have stemmed from the WGA's two John Doe Investigations on Walker's political campaign for the Wisconsin 2010 gubernatorial election and in again in 2013 following the implementation of act 10 in Wisconsin, wherein, Walker's campaign was accused of exploiting loop-holes to surpass donor limits for his campaigns. The direct facts of the investigation are limited due to the sensitivity of the information.

=== Establishment (2015) ===
The law to create the Wisconsin Elections Commission and the Wisconsin Ethics Commission, 2015 Wisconsin Act 118, was signed into law on December 16, 2015, by Governor Scott Walker. The two commissions formally came into existence on June 30, 2016, replacing the Wisconsin Government Accountability Board, which had overseen state elections and ethics since 2008.

=== Presidential election recount (2016) ===
On November 25, 2016, the commission received a petition from Green Party presidential nominee Jill Stein for a hand recount of the votes in the state from the 2016 presidential election. On November 28, the commission rejected Stein's request for a hand recount.

=== Attempted voter purge (2019–2020) ===
In 2019, the Wisconsin Institute for Law and Liberty (WILL) petitioned Paul V. Malloy, the presiding circuit court judge in Ozaukee County, Wisconsin, to remove 234,000 voters from the statewide rolls. WILL's lawsuit demanded that the commission respond to a "Movers Report," which was produced via computer analysis of voter data compiled by the Electronic Registration Information Center (ERIC). Funded in 2012 by the Pew Charitable Trusts, ERIC is a non-partisan national non-profit organization that shares voter registration information aimed at improving the accuracy and reliability of voter rolls and increasing voter participation.

Malloy ruled that Wisconsin law compelled him to order an urgent purging of those possibly invalid registrants from the voter rolls, and refused to grant standing to the League of Women Voters (LWV) and the Wisconsin Democracy Campaign (WDC) to intervene in the case. The WDC filed suit in federal court to halt the contested purging. Acting on behalf of the commission, which was split 3-3 on the matter Josh Kaul, Wisconsin's Attorney General, joined the appeal to stay Malloy's removals.

The ERIC report had tagged 234,039 registrations, around 7% of all registrants in Wisconsin, after its analysis concluded they might have moved to an address which had not yet been updated on their voter registration records, or were otherwise suspected to be invalid. Notifications were sent to all those voters that their registration might need to be brought up to date. Some sixty thousand of those notices were found to be undeliverable. Approximately 2,300 voters confirmed that their registrations were correct. An additional 16,500 had reregistered at more recent addresses. The registrations of those determined to be deceased would be removed. The commission estimated that the voter verification process would take one to two years to complete prior to initiating any action to remove those former voters, the accuracy of whose registrations still remained unresolved. Despite insufficient evidence for removal of that extraordinary number of qualified voters, the state could be forced to comply with Malloy's order. On January 2, 2020, WILL said it asked the circuit court to hold the Elections Commission in contempt, fining it up to $12,000 daily, until it advanced Malloy's December 17, 2019 order to remove from the rolls registrations of hundreds of thousands of voters who might have moved to a different address. The case was being heard in a state appeals court, but it was presumed that the conservative-dominated Wisconsin Supreme Court could be expected to support Malloy's ruling. The purge was construed to be targeting voters living in the cities of Madison, and Milwaukee, as well as college towns, which all tended to favor Democrats. Reporter and author Greg Palast associated the Wisconsin effort at voter purging as conforming to a national Republican party strategy which had attracted international attention. On January 12, 2020, Malloy found the three Democrats on the stalemated six-member Elections Commission to be in contempt of court, ordering them each to pay a fine of $250 daily until they complied with his order. Malloy demanded urgent implementation of his order, saying, "We're deadlocked, time is running and time is clearly of the essence." The Milwaukee Journal Sentinel examined the list of voters subject to being purged because they were presumed to have moved, and found that about 55 percent of those registrants had been domiciled in municipalities that had been won by Hillary Clinton in the 2016 general election.

=== The long 2020 election turmoil (2020–2024) ===
Controversies for the Wisconsin Elections Commission stretched over all of 2020, from the administration of the April 2020 Spring election, to the results of the November 2020 presidential election and beyond, as former president Donald Trump and his allies sought to stoke fears of election fraud before the election, and then sought to find scapegoats to blame after his election loss. The first major flashpoint in 2020 was the expansion of vote-by-mail opportunities for the Spring 2020 election—taking place in the first month after the arrival of the COVID-19 pandemic in Wisconsin. Trump began alleging that absentee ballots were a major source of fraud, and attacked the Wisconsin Elections Commission for its guidance to local election officials—particularly on the issue of absentee ballot drop boxes. After the election, Trump's allies also sought extralegal options to help him remain in office, including the designation of a fraudulent slate of presidential electors, whose votes they could attempt to use to challenge Wisconsin's legitimate electoral votes at the January 6, 2021, counting and certification of electoral votes in Congress. One of the fraudulent electors from Wisconsin was Wisconsin Elections Commission commissioner Robert Spindell.

The controversies over the 2020 election did not end after the counting of electoral votes on January 6, nor did they end after the inauguration of the new president on January 20, 2021. Calls continued from state Republicans in 2022 for changes to state election law, and some even called for the Wisconsin Elections Commission to be dissolved and replaced by another body—Republicans had just created the commission six years earlier, when they scrapped the nonpartisan Wisconsin Government Accountability Board. In the Spring of 2022, the rotating chair of the commission was set to revert to Republican control, and Republican commissioner Dean Knudson—one of the architects of the Wisconsin Elections Commission—was expected to become the next chairman. Knudson, however, faced opposition from his fellow Republicans on the commission, specifically from election-denier and fake presidential elector Robert F. Spindell.

As the commission convened to elect the chair, Knudson instead shocked the state's political apparatus by announcing he would resign from the commission. At the time, he said of the situation facing the commission:

To me, ... integrity demands acknowledging the truth, even when the truth is painful. In this case, the painful truth is that President Trump lost the election in 2020. He lost the election in Wisconsin in 2020. And the loss was not due to election fraud.

Elected officials, appointed officials and candidates at the highest levels in my party have refused to believe that President Trump lost. Even worse, some have peddled misinformation and perpetuated falsehoods about the 2020 election.

It's been made clear to me ... from the highest levels of the Republican Party in Wisconsin, that there was a deep desire that I not be chair.

Now, it's become clear to me that I cannot be effective in my role of representing Republicans on the commission.

With his resignation, Wisconsin Assembly speaker Robin Vos appointed a replacement, former elections commissioner Don M. Millis, who was then elected by the commission as their next chair.

The next point of controversy was the pending expiration of the term of the commission's administrator, Meagan Wolfe, who effectively serves as the state's top elections official, but has little discretion in the role—Wisconsin's elections are largely run at a local level and the Wisconsin Elections Commission administrator's role is to provide guidance to local units on interpretation of state law—and that guidance is non-binding. Despite the administrator's functionary role, Wolfe became the next lightning rod for Republican controversy. Her term was set to expire in June 2023, and because Republicans did not have the votes to appoint a different administrator, they believed that they could remove her by voting to renominate her and then having the Wisconsin Senate reject her nomination. Democrats on the commission short-circuited this plan by abstaining from the renomination vote, depriving her of a majority vote for renomination. This allowed Wolfe to remain in office indefinitely, because of a 2022 Wisconsin Supreme Court ruling in the case of State ex rel. Kaul v. Prehn. The Prehn case dealt with Frederick Prehn, a member of the state Board of Natural Resources, who had been appointed by the previous Republican governor and whose term had expired in May 2021. Democratic governor Tony Evers, in 2021, attempted to appoint a successor for Prehn, but Prehn refused to vacate the seat. The Wisconsin Supreme Court ruled that Prehn was entitled to remain in the position until the Wisconsin Senate approved a replacement—the senate had been sitting on many of Evers' nominations for more than a year by the time of the Prehn ruling. But the Prehn precedent now boomeranged against Republicans, as Wolfe was entitled to remain in office until a successor was properly nominated and confirmed.

The Republican majority in the state senate voted to deem Wolfe as nominated in an attempt to bypass the commission's nomination process. They proceeded to a party line vote rejecting Wolfe's "nomination". But Wisconsin attorney general Josh Kaul directed Wolfe to ignore the Senate vote and continue in office, suing in state court to clarify the legal situation. Republicans then began circulating articles of impeachment against Wolfe. Impeachment was already a hot topic in the state, because of a month-long drama over whether the Assembly would attempt to impeach the newest Wisconsin Supreme Court justice to forestall any ruling that would threaten the Republicans' preferred legislative district maps. In early October 2023, two conservative former Wisconsin Supreme Court justices spoke out against the use of impeachment for such partisan political purposes, and Republicans in the legislature then appeared to back away from some of their impeachment threats. Subsequently, in a filing in the attorney general's lawsuit on the status of the WEC administrator, Wisconsin Republicans acknowledged that their vote to reject Wolfe was "symbolic" and that Wolfe was "lawfully holding over" in her role.

The same day, however, Republicans in the state senate voted to reject the appointment of Democrat Joseph Czarnezki to the Wisconsin Elections Commission. Czarnezki had been serving on the commission in an acting capacity since the mid-term resignation of Julie Glancey in May 2023. Republicans in the senate justified their vote by saying Czarnezki had violated the law by refusing to promptly appoint a new administrator. Governor Tony Evers appointed a replacement within an hour.

On January 10, 2024, Dane County circuit judge Ann Peacock ruled on the question of Meagan Wolfe's status as administrator, finding that she was lawfully holding over, that the vote on her renomination was invalid without a majority of the commission, and that the state Senate vote to reject her "renomination" therefore had no legal weight. Senate Republicans had requested that the judge order the Wisconsin Elections Commission to officially nominate a replacement, but the judge also rejected that, finding no legal obligation for the commission to submit a timely nomination of a successor.

=== Redistricting (2022–2024) ===
On December 23, 2023, the Wisconsin Supreme Court issued its opinion in Clarke v. Wisconsin Elections Commission, holding that the state legislative maps violated the Constitution of Wisconsin. The 4–3 liberal majority enjoined the commission from using the state legislative maps in the 2024 Wisconsin elections and ordered a remedial process to draw new maps by March 2024.
