= Peggy Krusick =

American politician

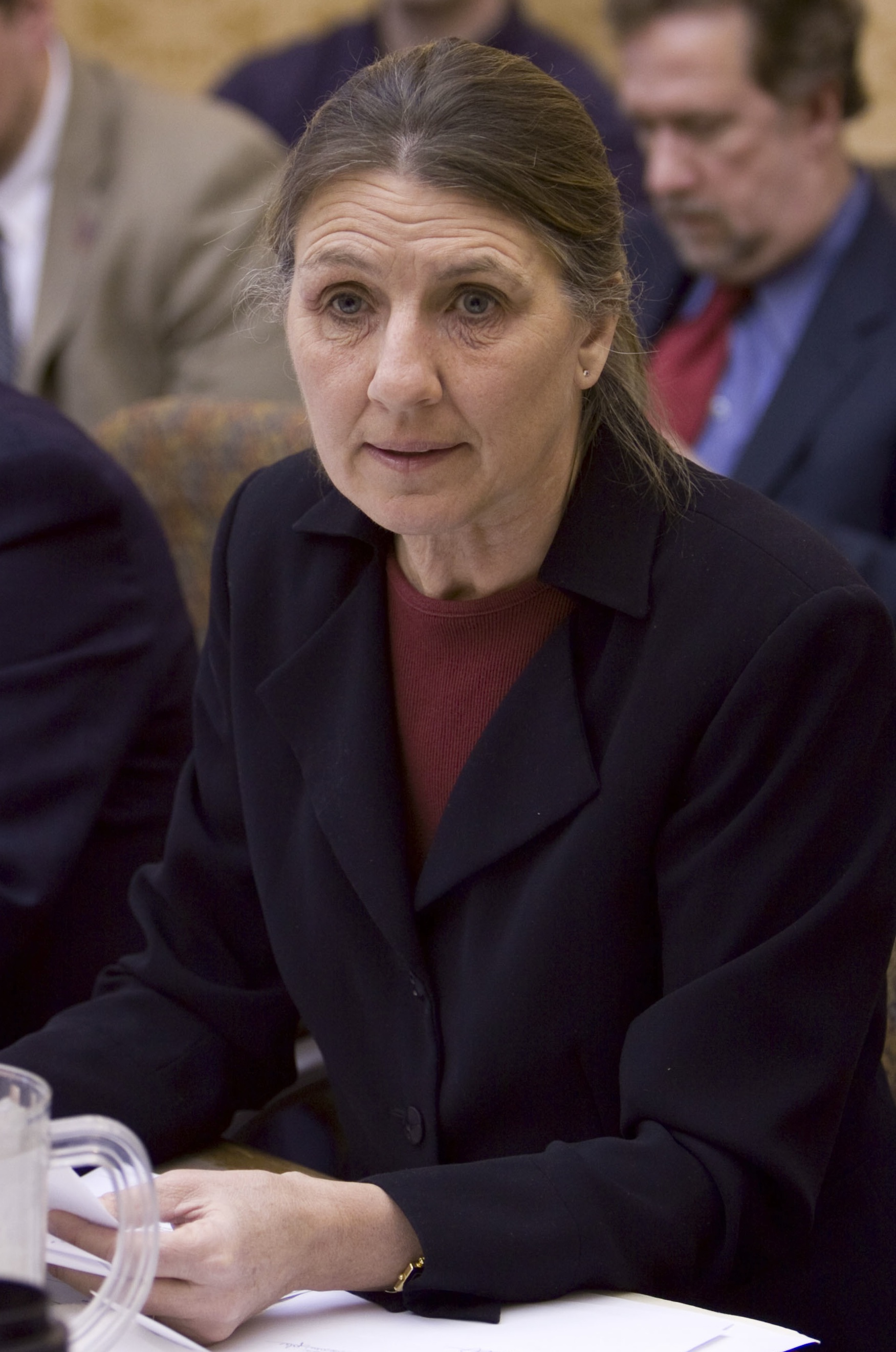
- Krusick in 2009

Member of the Wisconsin State Assembly
- In office January 6, 2003 – January 7, 2013
- Preceded by: Peter Bock
- Succeeded by: Daniel Riemer
- Constituency: 7th Assembly district
- In office January 4, 1993 – January 6, 2003
- Preceded by: Lolita Schneiders
- Succeeded by: Ann Nischke
- Constituency: 97th Assembly district
- In office January 7, 1985 – January 4, 1993
- Preceded by: Joseph F. Andrea
- Succeeded by: Lolita Schneiders
- Constituency: 24th Assembly district
- In office July 6, 1983 – January 7, 1985
- Preceded by: Joseph Czarnezki
- Succeeded by: Annette Polly Williams
- Constituency: 17th Assembly district

Personal details
- Born: October 26, 1956 (age 69) Milwaukee, Wisconsin, U.S.
- Party: Democratic
- Spouse: Roger Mroczenski (m. 1996)
- Children: 2
- Education: University of Wisconsin–Milwaukee (BA)
- Occupation: politician

Margaret Ann "Peggy" Krusick (born October 26, 1956) is an American retired Democratic politician from Milwaukee, Wisconsin. She was a member of the Wisconsin State Assembly for nearly thirty years (1983–2013), representing southwest wards of the city of Milwaukee and neighboring areas. She lost her seat to a primary challenge from Daniel Riemer in the 2012 assembly elections due to her stances on certain issues.

== Early life ==
Peggy Krusick was born and raised and lived most of her life in Milwaukee, Wisconsin. She graduated from Saint Gregory the Great Parish School and Hamilton High School. She went on to attend college at the University of Wisconsin–Milwaukee, where she earned her bachelor's degree in political science in 1978, with a certificate in law studies. She went on to pursue her master's in public administration at the University of Wisconsin–Madison, but did not complete that degree.

While in Madison, she was hired as a legislative aide for state representative Thomas A. Hauke.

== Political career ==
Krusick made her first run for Wisconsin State Assembly in 1980, running in what was then the 7th Assembly district. She came in second in a four-candidate Democratic Party primary, behind Joseph Czarnezki.

In 1983, Czarnezki won a special election for Wisconsin Senate, vacating his Assembly district, which, after the 1982 redistricting, was then the 17th Assembly district. Krusick entered the special election to succeed him in the Assembly. She easily prevailed in the May special primary, taking 71% of the vote over Guy Soucie, a brother of former state representative Kevin Soucie. She went on to defeat the Republican candidate, Bob Donovan, in the June special election. After the 1983 redistricting act, Krusick's district was unchanged but renumbered as the 24th Assembly district; in that district she won four more terms, though she only faced an opponent in the 1986 election.

During this early stretch in the Assembly, she was active in a variety of legislative activity. She was a member of the committees on criminal justice and public safety, on children and human services, and on education. She sponsored several anti-truancy laws, as well as laws on mining permits, therapist credentialing, cigarette control, lobbying regulation, and nursing home quality regulation. She also sponsored a law to allow law enforcement agencies to use state welfare data to search for people suspected of crimes.

In 1992, another redistricting plan took effect, and under the new plan she resided in the 97th Assembly district. The district contained much of her original territory in southwest Milwaukee, but stretched further to the south and west, adding several wards of suburban Greenfield, Wisconsin. Despite the changes, the district remained overwhelmingly Democratic. In 1992, she faced her first contested primary since 1983, but easily defeated challenger John F. Baumgartner. She went on to win four more terms in the 97th district; she defeated perennial Libertarian candidate Donald Carlson in three of those races.

After the 2002 redistricting, Krusick was moved into another new district, the 7th Assembly district. She faced no opponents for her first three elections in the new district, but in 2008, she faced her closest election since winning office in 1983, prevailing with just 59% of the vote in a year where Democratic turnout was unusually high.

These years sowed seeds of political trouble for Krusick. In 2002, a Democratic governor was elected for the first time since 1982, and in 2006, Democrats gained a majority of the state Senate and drew nearly even in the state Assembly. Krusick was one of the more conservative members of the Democratic caucus, and after Democrats gained the Assembly majority in 2008, Krusick was a member who frequently stood against measures of importance to the Democratic majority. Significantly, she was one of three Democrats who, in 2009, prevented the Legislature from repealing an 1849 law which was read at the time as a full ban on abortion.

=== 2012 defeat ===
In 2010, she faced her first contested primary since 1998, defeating Scott Dettman with 64% of the vote. Her general election margin ticked down again as well, receiving just 57% of the vote in 2010. The 2010 election ushered in full Republican control of government, and immediately resulted in major political strife. The Republicans also used their majority to pass a dramatic redistricting act, which reshaped the legislative map. Krusick still resided in the 7th Assembly district, but the district contained just 1/3 of the voters who had lived in the previous version of the 7th district.

In that environment, Krusick further aggravated her Democratic colleagues by proposing an amendment to a college grant program which prohibited the use of race as a factor in grant awards. Republicans embraced her proposal, but Democrats were so incensed that it turned into an all-night debate in the Assembly. Krusick was also the lone Democrat to vote along with Republicans in a bill to limit recall elections, a reaction to a rash of recall elections in the state during that legislative term. Subsequently, Democrats in the Assembly asked her to remove herself from the caucus.

Krusick was one of three incumbent Democratic state representatives who faced a primary challenge from the left in 2012. Krusick faced political newcomer, law student Daniel Riemer, whose father had previously been a high-ranking staffer in the administration of Wisconsin Governor Jim Doyle and ran unsuccessfully for Milwaukee County executive in 2004. Riemer argued that Krusick was too conservative to properly represent the district. For her past anti-abortion positions, Krusick won an endorsement from Wisconsin Right to Life, which may not have helped in a Democratic primary. On the other side of that issue, a Wisconsin pro-choice PAC targeted anti-abortion Democrats to assist their primary challengers. Krusick was soundly beaten in the primary, receiving only 33% of the vote. After losing the primary, Krusick attempted a write-in campaign for the general election, emphasizing her record as an effective independent. She garnered only 13% of the vote.

== Personal life and family ==
Peggy Krusick married Roger Mroczenski, a carpenter and homebuilder, on March 23, 1996. They had two children together.

== Electoral history ==
=== Wisconsin Assembly, 7th district (1980) ===
Year	Election	Date	Elected				Defeated				Total	Plurality
1980	Primary	Sep. 9	Joseph Czarnezki	Democratic	1,503	35.76%	Margaret Ann Krusick	Dem.	1,020	24.27%	4,203	483
1980	Primary	Sep. 9	Joseph Czarnezki	Democratic	1,503	35.76%	Bruce R. Bailey	Dem.	853	20.30%	4,203	483
1980	Primary	Sep. 9	Joseph Czarnezki	Democratic	1,503	35.76%	Joseph R. Krupa	Dem.	827	19.68%	4,203	483

=== Wisconsin Assembly, 17th district (1983) ===
Year	Election	Date	Elected				Defeated				Total	Plurality
1983 (special)	Primary	May 31	Margaret Ann Krusick	Democratic	3,583	70.88%	Guy Soucie	Dem.	1,472	29.12%	5,055	2,111
1983 (special)	Special	Jun. 28	Margaret Ann Krusick	Democratic	3,159	66.84%	Robert G. Donovan	Rep.	1,567	33.16%	4,726	1,592

=== Wisconsin Assembly, 24th district (1984–1990) ===
Year	Election	Date	Elected				Defeated				Total	Plurality
1984	General	Nov. 6	Margaret Ann Krusick	Democratic	19,018	100.0%	--unopposed--				19,018	19,018
1986	General	Nov. 4	Margaret Ann Krusick (inc)	Democratic	13,214	79.19%	Roger C. Anderson II	Rep.	3,473	20.81%	16,687	9,741
1988	General	Nov. 8	Margaret Ann Krusick (inc)	Democratic	19,920	100.0%	--unopposed--				19,920	19,920
1990	General	Nov. 6	Margaret Ann Krusick (inc)	Democratic	12,491	100.0%	--unopposed--				12,491	12,491

=== Wisconsin Assembly, 97th district (1992–2000) ===
Year	Election	Date	Elected				Defeated				Total	Plurality
1992	Primary	Sep. 8	Peggy Krusick	Democratic	7,909	89.72%	John F. Baumgartner	Dem.	906	10.28%	8,815	7,003
1992	General	Nov. 3	Peggy Krusick	Democratic	20,485	94.59%	Donald L. Carlson	Lib.	1,172	5.41%	21,657	19,313
1994	General	Nov. 8	Peggy Krusick (inc)	Democratic	13,576	74.70%	Nicholas Oliver	Rep.	4,271	23.50%	21,657	19,313
1994	General	Nov. 8	Peggy Krusick (inc)	Democratic	13,576	74.70%	Donald L. Carlson	Lib.	326	1.79%	21,657	19,313
1996	Primary	Sep. 10	Peggy Krusick (inc)	Democratic	4,516	90.46%	Peter Tubic	Dem.	476	9.54%	4,992	4,040
1996	General	Nov. 5	Peggy Krusick (inc)	Democratic	18,159	92.14%	Donald L. Carlson	Lib.	1,549	7.86%	19,708	16,610
1998	Primary	Sep. 8	Peggy Krusick (inc)	Democratic	2,640	93.95%	Peter Tubic	Dem.	170	6.05%	2,810	2,470
1998	General	Nov. 3	Peggy Krusick (inc)	Democratic	13,321	75.44%	Mark Brodaczynski	Rep.	4,336	24.56%	17,657	8,985
2000	General	Nov. 7	Peggy Krusick (inc)	Democratic	17,357	70.90%	Mark Brodaczynski	Rep.	7,094	28.98%	24,481	10,263

=== Wisconsin Assembly, 7th district (2002–2012) ===
Year	Election	Date	Elected				Defeated				Total	Plurality
2002	General	Nov. 5	Peggy Krusick	Democratic	13,482	98.65%	--unopposed--				13,666	13,298
2004	General	Nov. 2	Peggy Krusick (inc)	Democratic	21,074	98.91%	--unopposed--				21,307	20,841
2006	General	Nov. 7	Peggy Krusick (inc)	Democratic	16,072	98.90%	--unopposed--				16,250	15,894
2008	General	Nov. 4	Peggy Krusick (inc)	Democratic	16,568	59.53%	Corrine Wiesmueller	Rep.	10,578	38.01%	27,831	5,990
2008	General	Nov. 4	Peggy Krusick (inc)	Democratic	16,568	59.53%	Brad Sponholz	Lib.	655	2.35%	27,831	5,990
2010	Primary	Sep. 14	Peggy Krusick (inc)	Democratic	2,143	63.86%	Scott Dettman	Dem.	1,207	35.97%	3,356	936
2010	General	Nov. 2	Peggy Krusick (inc)	Democratic	11,782	57.53%	Brad Sponholz	Rep.	8,656	42.27%	20,478	3,126
2012	Primary	Aug. 14	Daniel Riemer	Democratic	1,908	66.76%	Peggy Krusick (inc)	Dem.	944	33.03%	2,858	964
2012	General	Nov. 6	Daniel Riemer	Democratic	16,664	85.35%	Peggy Krusick (inc) (write-in)	Dem.	2,499	12.80%	19,524	14,165

Wisconsin State Assembly
Preceded by Joseph Czarnezki	Member of the Wisconsin State Assembly from the 17th district July 6, 1983 – January 7, 1985	Succeeded by Annette Polly Williams
Preceded by Joseph F. Andrea	Member of the Wisconsin State Assembly from the 24th district January 7, 1985 – January 4, 1993	Succeeded by Lolita Schneiders
Preceded by Lolita Schneiders	Member of the Wisconsin State Assembly from the 97th district January 4, 1993 – January 6, 2003	Succeeded by Ann Nischke
Preceded by Peter Bock	Member of the Wisconsin State Assembly from the 7th district January 6, 2003 – January 7, 2013	Succeeded by Daniel Riemer
