= Meagan Wolfe =

U.S. election official

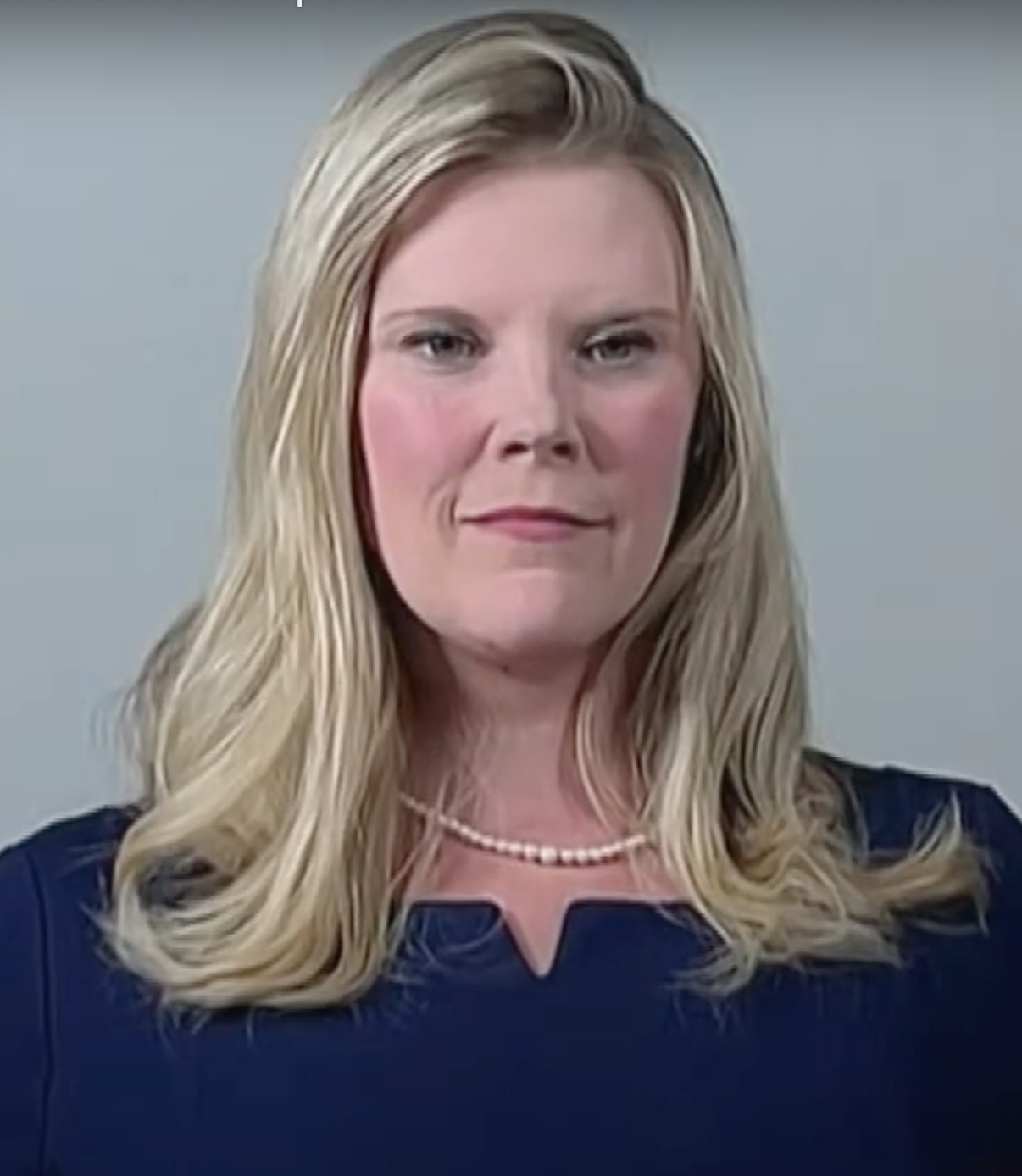
- Wolfe in 2023

Administrator of the Wisconsin Elections Commission
- Incumbent
- Assumed office May 15, 2019; Interim: March 2, 2018 – May 14, 2019
- Preceded by: Michael Haas

Personal details
- Born: Waukesha County, Wisconsin, U.S.
- Education: University of Wisconsin-Whitewater (BA)

Meagan Wolfe is an American election official who has served as the administrator of the Wisconsin Elections Commission since 2018. Prior to this role, she was the Commission's deputy administrator and IT director. She has been the target of election conspiracies and partisan complaints since the 2020 United States presidential election, and Republicans in the Wisconsin Legislature and on the Wisconsin Elections Commission attempted to remove her from office.

== Career ==
Wolfe was born in Waukesha County, Wisconsin, and raised in Waupaca County. In 2009, she founded a rental real estate company that refurbishes historic buildings in Madison, Wisconsin. In 2011, Wolfe joined the staff of the Wisconsin Government Accountability Board as the voter outreach coordinator. She was responsible for keeping the public informed on the state's election processes and voter identification laws. She stayed on when the board was reestablished as the Wisconsin Elections Commission (WEC). She later became an elections IT project manager and IT director. In 2017, Wolfe became deputy administrator of the commission.

In February 2018, the commission, comprising three Republicans and three Democrats, voted for Wolfe to serve as the interim administrator, succeeding Michael Haas. She was appointed interim administrator March 2, 2018, and was unanimously confirmed by the Wisconsin State Senate on May 15, 2019, for a term ending June 30, 2023.

== Removal efforts (2020–present) ==
Following the 2020 United States presidential election in Wisconsin, she faced calls by Republican members of the Wisconsin Legislature to resign. In response to the criticism, the Wisconsin Business Leaders for Democracy Coalition, a bipartisan group expressed support for Wolfe.

When her term came to an end in June 2023, Wolfe remained in office due to the recent Wisconsin Supreme Court ruling that the expiration of an appointed term did not alone warrant removal from office when no replacement had been confirmed. Republican officials then believed they could remove her through the Senate confirmation process, by renominating her and having the Senate reject her nomination. Republican members of the commission attempted to vote for her renomination, but the Democratic members of the commission abstained from the vote, preventing a majority vote for renomination.

The Wisconsin Senate deemed she had been renominated and that they would move to consider the nomination. The state attorney general, Josh Kaul, then wrote to the Senate telling them that there was no appointment and any Senate vote on the matter would be invalid. The Senate moved forward with their process and voted along party lines to disapprove of her reappointment. Following the advice of the attorney general, Wolfe remained in office and said of the Senate vote: "My position as administrator is, of course, subject to removal by the majority vote of the commission at any time. In the meantime, unless a final determination of a court says otherwise, I will continue to serve as the administrator of the (Wisconsin Elections Commission)." Kaul ultimately launched a lawsuit to clarify the legality of Wolfe's status, holding to the precedent of the recent Wisconsin Supreme Court decision in State ex rel. Kaul v. Prehn, where the court held that an official could remain in their post beyond the expiration of their term until a successor was properly nominated and confirmed.

Subsequently, a number of Republican state representatives, led by Janel Brandtjen, began circulating a resolution to attempt to remove her through the impeachment process. In early October, however, two conservative former Wisconsin Supreme Court justices spoke out against the use of impeachment for such partisan political purposes, and Republicans in the legislature then appeared to back away from some of their impeachment threats. Subsequently, in the attorney general's case on this matter, Republican filings indicated that they acknowledged that their vote to reject Wolfe was "symbolic" and that Wolfe was "lawfully holding over" in her role.

Those pushing for her ouster, however, were not dissuaded by the arguments of the conservative former Wisconsin Supreme Court justices about the serious nature of impeachment. Brandtjen called for her impeachment articles to move forward into the committee process, and her calls were echoed by former justice Michael Gableman, who had run an unsuccessful two-year investigation to find fraud in the 2020 election. In the first days of November 2023, a right wing PAC, calling itself "Wisconsin Elections Committee", began airing advertisements threatening the Wisconsin Assembly speaker, Robin Vos, with a recall and primary challenge if he did not move Brandtjen's impeachment resolution forward. Vos—who had barely survived a 2022 primary challenge—acceded to their demands just hours after the ad campaign was announced, and assigned the articles of impeachment to the Assembly Committee on Government Accountability and Oversight.

Within days of that announcement, former U.S. president Donald Trump also weighed in, sharing a copy of Brandtjen's press release to his social media followers on Truth Social. On November 9, 2023, Brandtjen attempted to bring her impeachment resolution to the Assembly floor, but the attempted was ruled out-of-order by speaker pro tempore Kevin David Petersen. Around that time, Vos commented, "I think we need to move forward and talk about the issues that matter to most Wisconsinites and that is not, for most Wisconsinites, obsessing about Meagan Wolfe."

The ad campaign against Wolfe proceeded anyway, and around the same time, Vos' appointee to the Wisconsin Elections Commission, Don Millis, came out with a strong defense of Wolfe in a Milwaukee Journal Sentinel op-ed, saying, "grifters are spending more than $100,000 to peddle lies about Elections Commission Administrator Meagan Wolfe". He went on to explain the legal and historical reality of the charges against Wolfe:

The truth is my predecessors on the commission, not Wolfe, authorized the use of drop boxes that were later declared illegal by the Wisconsin Supreme Court. The commission was unanimous, including my predecessor and the other two GOP commissioners, in authorizing unstaffed drop boxes. Similarly, it was the commission members, not Wolfe, who authorized the return of multiple ballots, sometimes described as ballot harvesting.

The ads continue, accusing Wolfe of permitting local governments to accept private funds to run elections, described as "Zuckerbucks," from an organization affiliated with Meta CEO Mark Zuckerberg. Wolfe has no authority to allow or deny the receipt of "Zuckerbucks." In fact, it was the commission, not Wolfe, that rejected a complaint challenging the acceptance of "Zuckerbucks" ...

Millis further chastised the Journal Sentinel and other Milwaukee media for not fact-checking the ads.

Nevertheless, right wing agitation continued calling for Wolfe's termination. The advertising and direct mail campaign did continue in southeast Wisconsin urging impeachment, and Vos received more pressure from his legislature colleagues, including Senate president Chris Kapenga. This campaign culminated in a recall campaign launched against Vos in January 2024.

Dane County circuit judge Ann Peacock ruled in favor of Wolfe on January 10, 2024, saying that the Wisconsin Elections Commission had not officially renominated her and therefore the state Senate's vote rejecting her renomination had no legal weight. Senate Republicans had requested that the judge order the Wisconsin Elections Commission to officially nominate a replacement, but the judge also rejected that, finding no legal obligation for the Commission to submit a timely nomination of a successor.

Wolfe continued to be a target of right wing conspiracy theories going into the 2024 presidential election. In an April 2024 radio interview, Trump again named Wolfe as a key scapegoat for his defeat in 2020, saying: "I couldn't understand how we lost that election because, you know, I love the state, I have so many friends in the state... It never made sense to me. Now we find out why. She should be gone." He also said that if she were not removed, she "will try to steal another election." He also continued trying to influence Republican Assembly speaker Robin Vos to find some way to get rid her. Following Trump's comments, and due to an increase in threats, Governor Tony Evers approved additional security for Wolfe.

Wisconsin Supreme Court ruled in favor of Meagan Wolfe on February 7, 2025, allowing her to continue as the state's elections administrator despite GOP opposition. In a unanimous decision written by conservative Chief Justice Annette Ziegler, the court rejected an argument from state Senate Majority Leader Devin LeMahieu, R-Oostburg, and other Republicans claiming the Wisconsin Elections Commission must appoint a new administrator . The order upheld a 2022 ruling from the court’s former conservative majority, which found Republican political appointee Fred Prehn could stay on Wisconsin's Natural Resources Board past his term. In that case, the court's conservative majority found that because the Senate never held a vote to confirm a replacement for Prehn, state law allowed him to stay in his role.

Government offices
Preceded by Michael Haas	Administrator of the Wisconsin Elections Commission; March 2, 2018 – present	Incumbent
