= Karen Kirsch =

21st century American politician

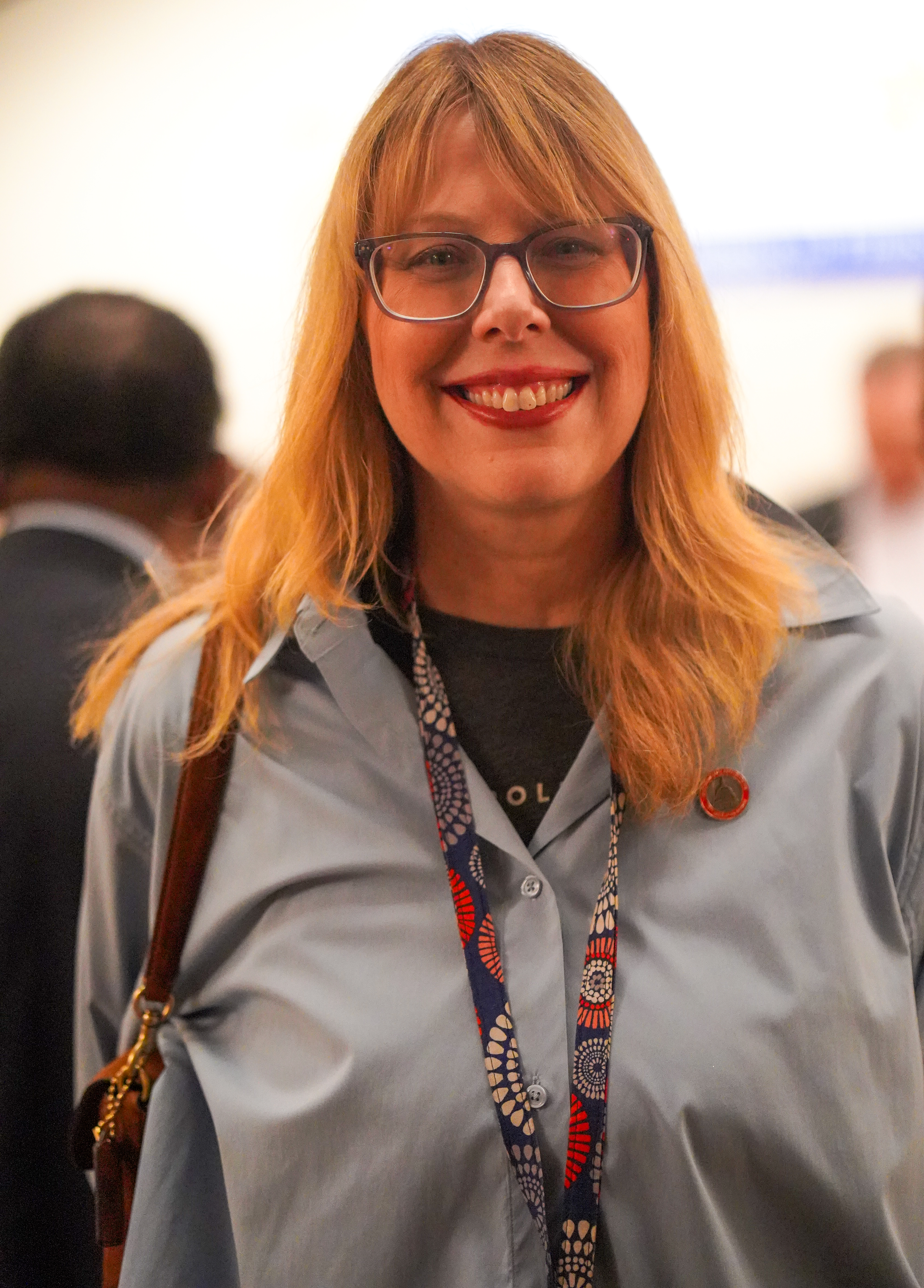
- Kirsch in 2026

Member of the Wisconsin State Assembly from the 7th district
- Incumbent
- Assumed office January 6, 2025
- Preceded by: Daniel Riemer

Personal details
- Born: Karen Marie Weber; April 30, 1968 (age 58) Port Washington, Wisconsin, U.S.
- Party: Democratic
- Spouses: John Gerard Kirsch (div. 2006); Robert William Hansen
- Children: 1
- Education: Milwaukee Area Technical College; Mount Mary University
- Occupation: Politician, marketing professional
- Website: Campaign website

Karen Marie Kirsch (née Weber; born April 30, 1968) is an American marketing professional and Democratic politician from Greenfield, Wisconsin. She is a member of the Wisconsin State Assembly, representing Wisconsin's 7th Assembly district since 2025. She previously served as a member of the administrative committee of the Democratic Party of Wisconsin.

Her partner, Rob Hansen, is a former chair of the Democratic Party of Milwaukee County.

== Early life and career ==
Karen Kirsch was born Karen Marie Weber in Port Washington, Wisconsin, on April 30, 1968. She was raised and educated in Milwaukee, graduating in 1986. She went on to attend Milwaukee Area Technical College, where she earned her associate degree in 1988. She continued her education at Milwaukee's Mount Mary University, where she earned her bachelor's degree in art education.

Through the 1990s, she worked for Charlton Photos, then went to work for the marketing firm Cramer-Krasselt. She worked for 18 years at Cramer-Krasselt, rising to become senior art producer and vice president.

== Political career ==
Kirsch became politically activated by the backlash to Wisconsin governor Scott Walker's signature legislation, 2011 Wisconsin Act 10. The law stripped public employee unions of their collective bargaining rights and ignited months of protests at the Wisconsin State Capitol.

This led her to become involved in the Democratic Party of Milwaukee County and campaigning for their candidates. In 2018 she was deputy campaign manager for Julie Henszey, who challenged incumbent state senator Dale Kooyenga in the 5th Senate district. From 2017 to 2019, she was also a member of the Democratic Party of Wisconsin's governing administrative committee.

In 2018, she left her employment at Cramer-Krasselt and took a full-time job with the progressive political action committee, Citizen Action Wisconsin, and is now campaigns director for the organization.

In 2024, the Wisconsin Legislature adopted a new legislative redistricting plan after the Wisconsin Supreme Court struck down the decade-old Republican gerrymander. Under the new plan, the 7th Assembly district was reshaped to comprise a large portion of the city of Greenfield. The Democratic incumbent, Daniel Riemer, announced in April 2024 that he would not run for a seventh term, leaving an open seat. Republican incumbent Bob Donovan, who was drawn into the district by the redistricting plan, announced he would relocate to run in another district. Kirsch announced her candidacy to succeed Riemer just a few days after he dropped out; she did not face an opponent for the Democratic nomination. In the general election, she won a comfortable victory over perennial candidate Lee Whiting. She took office in January 2025.

== Personal life and family ==
Karen Kirsch was one of two daughters born to Harvey Weber and Carol Mae (née Achsel). Her father was a member of the United Steelworkers union, working for 30 years at the Continental Can Company, and was active in the Democratic Party of Wisconsin.

Karen Marie Weber took the last name Kirsch when she married John Gerard Kirsch. They divorced in 2006. Karen Kirsch subsequently married Robert Hansen. Robert Hansen is a member of the Greenfield school board since 2013, and previously served as chairman of the Democratic Party of Milwaukee County; he was also a delegate to the 2016 Democratic National Convention supporting Bernie Sanders. They reside in Greenfield, Wisconsin; Karen is stepmother to Hansen's daughter from a previous marriage.

== Electoral history ==
=== Wisconsin Assembly (2024) ===
Wisconsin Assembly, 7th District Election, 2024
Party	Candidate	Votes	%	±%
General Election, November 5, 2024
Democratic	Karen Kirsch	16,014	58.49%	−3.31pp
Republican	Lee Whiting	11,289	41.24%	+3.14pp
	Scattering	74	0.27%	
Plurality		4,725	17.26%	-6.45pp
Total votes		27,377	100.0%	+35.63%
Democratic hold				

Wisconsin State Assembly
Preceded by Daniel Riemer	Member of the Wisconsin State Assembly from the 7th district January 6, 2025 – present	Incumbent
