= Daniel Riemer =

21st century American politician

Member of the Wisconsin State Assembly from the 7th district
- In office January 7, 2013 – January 6, 2025
- Preceded by: Peggy Krusick
- Succeeded by: Karen Kirsch

Personal details
- Born: December 10, 1986 (age 39) Milwaukee, Wisconsin, U.S.
- Party: Democratic
- Spouse: Paula Phillips (m. 2017)
- Children: 1
- Education: University of Chicago (BA); University of Wisconsin Law School (J.D.)
- Profession: Politician, lawyer
- Website: Official website

Daniel Graan Riemer (born December 10, 1986) is an American lawyer and Democratic politician from Milwaukee, Wisconsin. He was a member of the Wisconsin State Assembly, representing Wisconsin's 7th Assembly district from January 2013 until January 2025.

== Early life and education ==
Daniel Riemer was born in Milwaukee, Wisconsin, on December 10, 1986. His father, David Riemer, had been a policy advisor and budget director for former Wisconsin governor Jim Doyle. Daniel Riemer attended Milwaukee Public Schools and graduated from Milwaukee's Rufus King High School in 2005. He went on to earn his bachelor's degree from the University of Chicago in 2009 and subsequently attended the University of Wisconsin Law School, but his education was interrupted by his entrance into politics.

== Political career ==
In 2011, Wisconsin Republicans held complete control of state government and passed a partisan redistricting plan that drastically redrew the State Assembly map. The 7th Assembly district, previously dominated by the Milwaukee suburb Greenfield, was redrawn to stretch from West Allis and West Milwaukee, across part of Greenfield, containing neighborhoods of the city of Milwaukee's south side. The new district contained just 1/3 of the previous constituents. Riemer launched a primary challenge against Democrat Peggy Krusick in 2012 for her more conservative positions and stances on abortion, with her being endorsed by Wisconsin Right to Life. At the time, Krusick had been in the Assembly for nearly 30 years—longer than Riemer had been alive.

Riemer prevailed in the primary with 67% of the vote and there were no other major party candidates appearing on the general election ballot. Krusick decided to run a write-in campaign for the general election, touting her moderate record, but Riemer won a large majority in the new district.

Riemer returned to law school on a part-time basis during the Fall of 2012; he ultimately graduated with his J.D. in December 2013 and was admitted to the State Bar of Wisconsin in April 2014.

Riemer has been reelected five times. In 2021, Riemer began a brief run for Mayor of Milwaukee in 2021 following the resignation of Mayor Tom Barrett, but withdrew from the race before the filing deadline.

Riemer made 2022 his last campaign for office, as he announced he would retire from the state assembly at the end of the 2023 session to spend time with his family.

== Personal life ==
Riemer married Paula Phillips on July 30, 2017. His wife was elected to the Milwaukee Board of School Directors while she and Riemer were engaged, in April 2017, but she did not run for re-election in 2021. Riemer and his family live on Milwaukee's south side.

== Electoral history ==
=== Wisconsin Assembly (2012–2022) ===
Year	Election	Date	Elected				Defeated				Total	Plurality
2012	Primary	Aug. 14	Daniel Riemer	Democratic	1,908	66.76%	Peggy Krusick (inc)	Dem.	944	33.03%	2,858	964
2012	General	Nov. 6	Daniel Riemer	Democratic	16,664	85.35%	Peggy Krusick (inc, write-in)	Dem.	2,499	12.80%	19,524	14,165
2012	General	Nov. 6	Daniel Riemer	Democratic	16,664	85.35%	Tiffany Lee Koehler (write-in)	Ind.	2	0.01%	19,524	14,165
2014	General	Nov. 4	Daniel Riemer (inc)	Democratic	11,065	55.52%	Scott Espeseth	Rep.	8,800	44.16%	19,928	2,265
2016	General	Nov. 8	Daniel Riemer (inc)	Democratic	13,514	56.14%	Zachary Marshall	Rep.	9,212	38.27%	24,073	4,302
2016	General	Nov. 8	Daniel Riemer (inc)	Democratic	13,514	56.14%	Matthew J. Bughman	Lib.	1,303	5.41%	24,073	4,302
2018	General	Nov. 6	Daniel Riemer (inc)	Democratic	15,187	78.28%	Matthew J. Bughman	Lib.	3,953	20.38%	19,400	11,234
2020	General	Nov. 3	Daniel Riemer (inc)	Democratic	19,431	97.11%	--unopposed--				20,009	18,853
2022	General	Nov. 3	Daniel Riemer (inc)	Democratic	12,476	61.81%	Zachary Marshall	Rep.	7,690	38.10%	20,185	4,786

Wisconsin State Assembly
Preceded by Peggy Krusick	Member of the Wisconsin State Assembly from the 7th district January 7, 2013 – present	Succeeded by Karen Kirsch
