= Impeachment in Wisconsin =

Process of the Wisconsin Legislature

Impeachment in Wisconsin is the main process by which the Wisconsin Legislature can bring charges and decide whether to remove state officers from their positions. A simple majority of the Wisconsin State Assembly can impeach an officer, after which the Wisconsin Senate acts as the court of trial, where a two-thirds majority is required to convict. In the event of a conviction, the punishment may be removal from office or removal and disqualification to hold state office.

Wisconsin also has an additional impeachment-like option for removal of judicial officers, known as "removal by address". Judges may be removed by address for any reason, but it requires a two-thirds majority of both chambers of the Legislature, and the judge must first be informed of the charges and allowed to make their case to the Legislature. Any elected official in Wisconsin may alternatively be removed through a recall election.

Only one official has ever been impeached in Wisconsin history: state circuit judge Levi Hubbell, in 1853. He was not convicted.

== Impeachment law ==
The impeachment power is defined in Article VII, Section 1, of the Constitution of Wisconsin, which reads, in its entirety:

The court for the trial of impeachments shall be composed of the senate. The assembly shall have the power of impeaching all civil officers of this state for corrupt conduct in office, or for crimes and misdemeanors; but a majority of all the members elected shall concur in an impeachment. On the trial of an impeachment against the governor, the lieutenant governor shall not act as a member of the court. No judicial officer shall exercise his office, after he shall have been impeached, until his acquittal. Before the trial of an impeachment the members of the court shall take an oath or affirmation truly and impartially to try the impeachment according to evidence; and no person shall be convicted without the concurrence of two−thirds of the members present. Judgment in cases of impeachment shall not extend further than to removal from office, or removal from office and disqualification to hold any office of honor, profit or trust under the state; but the party impeached shall be liable to indictment, trial and punishment according to law.

Impeachment in Wisconsin applies to civil officers of the state. However "civil officers" is a term that is not defined. The constitutional grounds for an impeachment are "corrupt conduct in office or for the commission of a crime or misdemeanor."

Impeachment is a two-step process, consisting of a vote in the State Assembly followed by an impeachment trial in the Senate. An impeachment vote in the Assembly requires a vote of the majority of the entire membership. In order to convict in an impeachment trial, two-thirds of senators present must vote to convict.

A conviction will remove an official from their office, and the Senate can choose whether to impose the additional penalty of disqualification from future office. The constitution specifically states that these are the only penalties possible through impeachment, but allows that an impeached officer can separately be liable to indictment and trial through the normal criminal or civil process for the same conduct.

For gubernatorial impeachments, the lieutenant governor is prohibited from presiding or participating in the trial. Impeached judicial officers are suspended from their office until the judgement of the trial.

== Other means of removal in Wisconsin ==
=== Address (judges) ===
Wisconsin's constitution includes a separate, broader, impeachment-like option for removal of judges, known as "removal by address". This power is defined in Article VII, Section 13, of the constitution, which reads:

Any justice or judge may be removed from office by address of both chambers of the legislature, if two−thirds of all the members elected to each house concur therein, but no removal shall be made by virtue of this section unless the justice or judge complained of is served with a copy of the charges, as the ground of address, and has had an opportunity of being heard. On the question of removal, the ayes and noes shall be entered on the journals.

Unlike the impeachment section, this section applies only to "any justice or judge". Also unlike impeachment, there are no limitations on the rationale for removal—those addressed can be removed for any reason. But the removal must meet a higher bar of concurrence in the Legislature, requiring two thirds of both chambers.

=== Removal for cause or disability (state judges) ===
Since a 1977 amendment, Wisconsin's constitution, in Section 11 of Article VII, also allows for the Wisconsin Supreme Court to censure, suspend, or remove state judges for cause or disability. The section reads:

Each justice or judge shall be subject to reprimand, censure, suspension, removal for cause or for disability, by the supreme court pursuant to procedures established by the legislature by law. No justice or judge removed for cause shall be eligible for reappointment or temporary service. This section is alternative to, and cumulative with, the methods of removal provided in sections 1 and 13 of this article and section 12 of article XIII.

Under current law, judges are eligible for removal if they have engaged in misconduct which includes violations of the judicial ethics code, failure to perform certain job duties, substance abuse which interferes with their job performance, or felony conviction.

Current law also requires that any removal for cause or disability must begin with an investigation by the Wisconsin Judicial Commission, with the accused being allowed to respond to allegations, followed by a hearing before a jury or a panel of judges. Recommendations from that panel are then referred to the Wisconsin Supreme Court, which can take whatever action they deem appropriate (they are not bound by the recommendations of the panel).

=== Recall (elected state government officials) ===
Wisconsin's constitution was amended in 1926 to add Section 12 of Article XIII, allowing for citizen-initiated recall of any elected official of state government after the first year of their term has concluded. Recalls are initiated by a public petition, which must be signed by eligible voters of the state, county, or district which elected the official equaling at least 25% of the votes cast in the state, county, or district in the most recent gubernatorial election.

Once the petition is filed with the requisite number of valid signatures, the election administrator shall set a recall election for the Tuesday of the 6th week following the petition filing (or, if that Tuesday is a holiday, the next non-holiday Tuesday after that date). Unlike impeachment, an officer facing recall may continue to perform the duties of their office until the recall election is held. In the event of an official surviving a recall election, that official cannot be recalled again during the same elected term.

=== Expulsion (state legislators) ===
In Wisconsin, state legislators are subject to removal by expulsion. An expulsion occurs when two-thirds of the legislative chamber to which the legislator is a member votes to expel that member.

== History ==
Impeachment has been rarely used or threatened in Wisconsin history. Wisconsin has only ever impeached one officer—Wisconsin circuit court judge Levi Hubbell, in the 1853 legislative term. He was ultimately acquitted. In 2023, there was a sudden rash of impeachment threats as Republicans held a rare two-thirds majority in the state senate, and sought to leverage that power against the judiciary and other independent agencies of the state government.

=== Impeachment of Circuit Court Judge Levi Hubbell (1853) ===
The only impeachment in the state's history occurred in 1853, when Levi Hubbell, a Wisconsin circuit court judge, was impeached by the Assembly for allegations of bribery and corruption. Hubbell had also recently served as chief justice of the Wisconsin Supreme Court, as the supreme court was made up of the state's five (later six) circuit judges between 1848 and 1853.

The impeachment effort was led by lawyer Edward George Ryan and other opponents of Hubbell. Ryan and Hubbell had a relationship that had soured years earlier, in part due to Hubbell's refusal to take Ryan's advice while serving on the original incarnation of the Wisconsin Supreme Court about how to address what Ryan considered to be the inadequacies of the court. Their relationship worsened further due to Ryan's anger at how Hubbell presided over a murder trial in which Ryan was the prosecutor.

On January 18, 1853, Ryan told Caleb Cushing that impeachment charges that had been "drawn under the direction of myself and other gentlemen here" had been authored. Hubbell was accused by Ryan of having accepted bribes and having heard cases in circuit court on matters in which he had a personal financial interest. On January 26, William K. Wilson gave State Assembly Speaker Henry L. Palmer a communication signed to "a citizen and elector of the State" which accused Hubbell of "high crimes, misdemeanors, and malfeasances in office." This communication was read in the State Assembly that day. The communication was then, after some discussion, referred to a five-member select committee. On February 23, the select committee reported its recommendation that Hubbell be removed from office, recommending removal by address, a means which would require two-thirds of each house and the approval of the governor. Removal by address would not include a trial stage. However, the State Assembly instead opted to pursue an impeachment, adopting an impeachment resolution. The impeachment resolution was adopted on March 3. A five member Investigating Committee was appointed to author articles of impeachment and present them to the Senate. On March 5, the members of this committee informed the Senate of the impeachment. On March 19, with the redaction of two specifications of the tenth charge, the articles of impeachment were reported to the State Assembly. One March 20, five impeachment managers were appointed by the State Assembly. The full articles of impeachment that contained seventy different specifications were filed with the Senate on March 22, 1853. The articles of impeachment accused Hubbell of such wrongdoings as:

- Accepting bribes (providing a specific allegation that he had taken a $200 loan from a litigant that was never repaid)
- Having intermediaries recommend judgments and notes to him, and then arranging so that he could preside over cases on those matters
- Handing-down criminal sentence below mandatory minimums
- Presiding both in the circuit and supreme courts on cases for which he had acted as attorney
- Making personal use of money paid to the court
- Biased treatment of parties
- Meddling in lawsuits likely to come before his court or already pending before his court, as well as giving advice on such lawsuits
- Immoral use of his position and his influence; an allegation primarily accusing him of suspicious circumstances in which he lured women into rooms hotels and boarding houses for "private interviews"

All alleged misconduct were said to have taken place during Hubbell's first term as a judge.

At the time of the impeachment, the Democratic Party held majorities in both the State Assembly and Senate. The impeachment trial did not see a partisan divide. It nevertheless, became contentious. Historian and reporter A. M. Thompson observed that the trial, "was not an occasion that called for any display of partisanship, and none was shown. Personal prejudice, hatred, jealousy, and rivalry took its place."

On June 13, 1853, at the start of his impeachment trial, Hubbell plead "not guilty". The trial lasted for almost one month, with the local weather seeing very high temperatures and humidity throughout the trial. Ryan acted as a prosecuting attorney, acting on behalf of the State Assembly. Hubbell was defended by Jonathan Earle Arnold and James H. Knowlton. All attorneys were members of the Democratic Party.

Ryan's arguments were heated and displayed cruelty towards Hubbell. Hubbell's lawyers ignored Ryan's presentation, instead largely focusing on arguing against each charge. They argued that in order to be corrupt conduct or crimes and misdemeanors rising to removal, each alleged act would need to be clearly proven; would have been committed with malicious or guilty intent; and would need to be wrongful, illegal, or unconstitutional. They also told senators that some of the conduct alleged would be encouraged by the low pay which judges received.

Ryan's conduct might have hurt the case against Hubbell. Marilyn Grant observes,

Ryan's scathing and vindictive attacks on Hubbell and his failure to present arguments in a concise manner weakened his case and probably provoked sympathy for the emotion ally distraught Hubbell, who wept openly on occasion.

Hubbell was acquitted after none of the charges reached the necessary two-thirds threshold to convict. However, the vote evidenced that the Senate was divided. Only twelve of the twenty-four senators had consistently voted to acquit on every count, with the remaining twelve splitting their votes. Seven of the eleven charges received unanimous acquittal, while the remainder saw a share of senators consider Hubbell guilty. While Hubbell was acquitted in his impeachment trial, he suffered harm to his reputation.

Lawyer and historian Joseph A. Ranney opined that, "Many people at the time felt Ryan went too far in his crusade against Hubbell, but in the long run he may have helped save Wisconsin's justice system from permanent damage", opining that the trial, "made clear that Hubbell's conduct had been far from exemplary and that in future judges would be expected to act impartially both in and outside the courtroom." Ryan went on to become the 5th chief justice of the Wisconsin Supreme Court, appointed to the position in 1874.

=== Threatened impeachment of Supreme Court Justice Janet Protasiewicz (2023) ===
Within days of her election in April 2023, and increasing in August 2023 (the month she took office, and before she had even heard a single case), notable Republicans in Wisconsin—including State Assembly speaker Robin Vos and former governor Scott Walker—discussed the idea of impeaching liberal justice Janet Protasiewicz. Protasiewicz had been handily elected in April 2023 over a conservative opponent and her election effectively flipped the majority of the court from conservative to liberal.

This impeachment effort was widely viewed as motivated by Republican concern about the court's new liberal majority potentially ruling the state's gerrymander to be unconstitutional. Republicans asserted that Protasiewicz had pre-judged the gerrymandering issue, based on comments she made during the 2023 campaign. They threatened that if she did not recuse from cases dealing with the legislative maps, then they would pursue impeachment. In addition to the impeachment threats, Republicans made several of these same complaints to the Wisconsin Judicial Commission—a nonpartisan body which adjudicates complaints about state judges—but the Judicial Commission dismissed those complaints.

Reid J. Epstein of The New York Times noted,

As at the U.S. Supreme Court, recusal decisions are left to the Wisconsin justices themselves. In years past, conservative justices have argued that personal views they had previously stated did not mean they were required to recuse themselves from relevant cases.

Because Wisconsin's Democratic governor, Tony Evers, would have just appointed another Democratic-friendly justice to the court if Protasiewicz were removed, Republicans speculated in public about further gaming the impeachment process to keep Protasiewicz in suspense for a year or more without holding a trial on whether to remove her from office. The issue quickly gathered national attention, and state Democrats began mobilizing to defend Protasiewicz and fight against impeachment.

After the initial pushback, Assembly speaker Robin Vos announced the creation of a panel of former Wisconsin Supreme Court justices that would investigate criteria for an impeachment. It subsequently became known that the panel consisted of conservative former justices David Prosser Jr. and Jon P. Wilcox, as well as former chief justice Patience Roggensack. Prosser was the first to make his opinions publicly known, writing in an October 6 letter to the speaker:

Section 1 of Article VII states that before the trial of impeachment, "the members of the court [Senate] shall take an oath or affirmation truly and impartially to try impeachment according to evidence." In my view, there is no assurance that two-thirds of the present "court" would be convinced that they are bound "impartially" by the "evidence" to vote for impeachment. Once again, the "evidence" has to persuade members of the court... and a large percentage of the public... that impeachment is legitimate. Impeachment that appears to be solely partisan will likely backfire.

Even if a Supreme Court Justice were impeached and convicted, the governor would promptly name a successor who might be more problematic.

The Constitution also provides that "no judicial officer shall exercise his [or her] office, after he [or she] shall be impeached, until his [or her] acquittal." To impeach a justice solely to delay a case or cases will be viewed as unreasonable partisan politics.

To sum up my views, there should be no effort to impeach Justice Protasiewicz on anything we know now. Impeachment is so serious, severe, and rare that it should not be considered unless the subject has committed a crime, or the subject has committed indisputable "corrupt conduct" while "in office."

Shortly after the release of the Prosser letter, Wilcox agreed with Prosser's opinion that impeachment was not justified in this case. In late December 2023, Vos finally confirmed that the Assembly was unlikely to launch an impeachment of Protasiewicz over the redistricting case.

=== Proposed impeachment of Election Administrator Meagan Wolfe (2023) ===
By September 2023, Wisconsin Elections Commission administrator Meagan Wolfe had been a target of right wing conspiracy theories about the 2020 election for over three years. The administrator—who is appointed by the six-member elections commission—has really no role in running Wisconsin elections, as all elections are managed by local clerks. Her primary role is to issue non-binding advisory opinions to the local clerks on questions about the law or the decisions voted on by the six elections commissioners.

Since the commission—by design—was evenly divided between Republicans and Democrats, state Republicans hoped that they would be able to remove Wolfe by renominating her for a new term as administrator and then having the Wisconsin Senate vote to reject her nomination. Democrats determined to utilize the recent Wisconsin Supreme Court case of Kaul v. Prehn, where the court held that an officeholder could remain in office indefinitely after their term expires until a successor is properly nominated and confirmed. Democrats thus refused to vote for Wolfe's renomination, denying a majority for renomination. Republicans in the state senate voted to "deem" Wolfe as nominated and then proceeded to vote their disapproval, but Wisconsin's attorney general Josh Kaul directed Wolfe to ignore the senate's vote as illegitimate. Kaul sued in state court to clarify Wolfe's legal status, which ultimately saw lawyers for legislative Republicans admitting that their vote of disapproval had been merely "symbolic".

Far right Republicans sought other options to remove her from office, and so a group of five Republican state representatives, led by Janel Brandtjen, drafted articles of impeachment. Brandtjen had been steeped in the right wing conspiracy theories about the 2020 U.S. presidential election in the state, which led to her being sanctioned by the Assembly Republican caucus and removed from her committee chairmanship in 2022. In late October 2023, former Wisconsin Supreme Court justice Michael Gableman echoed Brandtjen's complaints, suggesting that Wisconsin Assembly speaker Robin Vos should be recalled from office or face a primary challenge if he did not move an impeachment forward. Gableman—like Brandtjen—also had a bitter history with Vos, who had hired him in 2021 to pursue an investigation into the 2020 election. After a series of controversies and embarrassing court appearances, Gableman had endorsed a primary challenger against Vos in the 2022 election, and Vos had unceremoniously fired Gableman days after barely surviving that 2022 primary. Days after Gableman's statements, a right wing PAC calling itself the "Wisconsin Elections Committee", echoed Gableman's demands with an $80,000 ad purchase in southeast Wisconsin, threatening Vos with a recall and primary challenge if he did not advance articles of impeachment against Meagan Wolfe. Just hours after the pressure campaign was publicly announced, Vos took steps to move forward with the impeachment, referring the impeachment proposal to the Assembly Committee on Government Accountability and Oversight. Days later, former U.S. president Donald Trump weighed in, sharing a copy of Brandtjen's press release to his social media followers on Truth Social. On November 9, 2023, Brandtjen attempted to bring her impeachment resolution to the Assembly floor, but the attempted was ruled out-of-order by speaker pro tempore Kevin David Petersen. Around that time, Vos indicated that he found impeachment unimportant/untimely, remarking, "I think we need to move forward and talk about the issues that matter to most Wisconsinites and that is not, for most Wisconsinites, obsessing about Meagan Wolfe."

The promised publicity campaign was promptly launched in southwest Wisconsin, where advertisements were run and direct mail was sent. Amid the torrent of advertisements attacking Wolfe. Don Millis (Vos' appointee to the Wisconsin Elections Commission) issued a strong public defense of Wolfe in a Milwaukee Journal Sentinel op-ed. Complaining that "grifters are spending more than $100,000 to peddle lies about Elections Commission Administrator Meagan Wolfe", and criticized the Journal Sentinel and other Milwaukee media outlets for running the falsehood-laden advertisements. Millis explained the legal and historical reality of the charges against Wolfe:

The truth is my predecessors on the commission, not Wolfe, authorized the use of drop boxes that were later declared illegal by the Wisconsin Supreme Court. The commission was unanimous, including my predecessor and the other two GOP commissioners, in authorizing unstaffed drop boxes. Similarly, it was the commission members, not Wolfe, who authorized the return of multiple ballots, sometimes described as ballot harvesting.

The ads continue, accusing Wolfe of permitting local governments to accept private funds to run elections, described as “Zuckerbucks,” from an organization affiliated with Meta CEO Mark Zuckerberg. Wolfe has no authority to allow or deny the receipt of “Zuckerbucks.” In fact, it was the commission, not Wolfe, that rejected a complaint challenging the acceptance of “Zuckerbucks” ...

Vos received further pressure from state legislative colleagues to impeach Wolfe. In December, Senate President Chris Kapenga urged Vos to impeach Wolfe.

Right-wing anger at Vos (fueled both by the lack of an impeachment against Wolfe and by Vos declining to hold a vote to "decertify" Joe Biden's 2020 presidential election victory in the state) resulted in two efforts to trigger recall elections. In the first half 2024, the two groups behind these efforts spent more than $1.5 million towards this aim. Both efforts' petitions for recall elections were rejected by the Wisconsin Elections Commission. Wolfe (herself the commission's administrator) is not a voting member of the commission, and therefore was not herself a part of the votes.

=== Other ===
In 2025 and early 2026, there was Republican discussion of impeaching Judge Hannah Dugan, before she resigned.

== See also ==
- Impeachment by state and territorial governments of the United States
- Impeachment in the United States
- Constitution of Wisconsin

== Sources cited ==
- Leland, T. C. (1853). Trial of Impeachment of Levi Hubbell, Judge of the Second Judicial Circuit, by the Senate of the State of Wisconsin, June 1853. B. Brown.
