= Wisconsin Government Accountability Board =

Former election and ethics regulatory body of the Wisconsin state government

Agency overview
- Formed: January 10, 2008
- Preceding agency: Wisconsin Elections Board (1973–2008)
- Dissolved: June 29, 2016
- Superseding agencies: Wisconsin Elections Commission; Wisconsin Ethics Commission
- Headquarters: 212 E. Washington Ave. Madison, Wisconsin, U.S. 43°4′36.732″N 89°22′56.028″W
- Employees: 48.75 (2015)
- Annual budget: $14,007,000 (2015)
- Website: gab.wi.gov (Archived)

The Wisconsin Government Accountability Board (G.A.B.) was a regulatory agency of the U.S. state of Wisconsin which administered and enforced Wisconsin law pertaining to campaign finance, elections, ethics, and lobbying. The board was composed of six retired Wisconsin judges who served staggered, six-year terms. The board was created in 2007 as an attempt to reform and modernize Wisconsin's elections and ethics management. The board was dissolved in 2016 by the Republican legislature and replaced by two new commissions with explicitly partisan appointees (Wisconsin Ethics Commission & Wisconsin Elections Commission), over the objections of Democratic legislators.

== Composition ==
The Board consisted of six members who served staggered, six-year terms. Board members were appointed by the Governor of Wisconsin, but the Governor had to select from a pool of retired state court judges chosen by a selection committee composed of a randomized set of Wisconsin Appeals Court judges, and the Governor's appointees had to then be approved by the Wisconsin Senate. The board members served part-time, and received a per diem for each meeting they attended.

== History and controversies ==
The G.A.B. was created as a reform measure after the Wisconsin "legislative caucus scandal" in 2001 which led to criminal convictions of the state Assembly's highest-ranking Republican (Speaker Scott Jensen), the state Senate's highest-ranking Democrat (Majority Leader Chuck Chvala), and other officials. The G.A.B. was tasked with overseeing elections, ethics and lobbying in the state. The 2007 Wisconsin Act 1, which passed the Wisconsin Legislature on a bipartisan vote in January 2007, merged the State Elections Board and State Ethics Board into the new G.A.B.

The G.A.B. had a nonpartisan structure unique among election boards in the United States, with G.A.B. led by six former judges appointed by the governor and confirmed by the state Senate. In contrast to the G.A.B.'s nonpartisan model, state election boards in other U.S. states were either partisan (ie., run by elected or appointed partisan officials) or bipartisan. G.A.B. members could not "hold another state or local public office (except as reserve judge), engage in partisan political activities, become a candidate for state or local elected office, make political contributions, or be a lobbyist or employed by a person who employs a lobbyist. They also have limitations on political activities and certain types of contributions both during and 12 months prior to a member's term." The G.A.B.'s structure was praised by some experts.

Law professor Daniel P. Tokaji, who studied the G.A.B., praised the agency's model, concluding in 2013 that "GAB has been successful in administering elections evenhandledly and... serves as a worthy model for other states considering alternatives to partisan election administration at the state level." The Board had the power to investigate independently, without the approval of the legislature. The G.A.B. oversaw a series of recall elections for the state senate in 2011 and for state senate and governor in 2012.

The G.A.B. was consistently criticized by Wisconsin Republicans, such as Assembly Speaker Robin Vos and Senate Majority Leader Scott L. Fitzgerald, and the conservative advocacy group Americans for Prosperity; these critics accused the G.A.B. of unfairly targeting Republicans. Republicans were particularly angry over a G.A.B. investigation into whether Republican Governor Scott Walker's campaign had unlawfully coordinated with the Club for Growth and other "outside" groups during the 2012 recall election.

By contrast, Democrats and groups such as the Wisconsin Democracy Campaign and Common Cause defended the G.A.B. In December 2015, Walker signed a bill that dissolved the G.A.B., effective on June 30, 2016, and replaced it with a separate Wisconsin Elections Board and Wisconsin Ethics Commission.

The legislation dismantling the G.A.B. passed along party lines, with Republicans voting yes and Democrats voting no. Wisconsin's reversion to a "bipartisan" rather than "nonpartisan" model increased the power of the Republican-controlled legislature, and also increased deadlocks; while the G.A.B. rarely deadlocked, the Elections Commission has frequently deadlocked along party lines. The 2015 legislation also restored the practice of allowing state legislators to control funding for investigations into possible misconduct by state officials. Just a few years after abolishing the G.A.B., Republican legislators—angry over the outcome of the 2020 election—were calling for abolishing the Wisconsin Elections Commission which they had built to replace it.
