= Wisconsin's 69th Assembly district =

American legislative district in north-central Wisconsin

Wisconsin's 69th State Assembly district
- 2024 map defined in 2023 Wisc. Act 94; 2022 map defined in Johnson v. Wisconsin Elections Commission; 2011 map was defined in 2011 Wisc. Act 43
Assemblymember
Karen Hurd; R–Thorp
since January 6, 2025 (1 years)
- Demographics: 91.17% White; 1.85% Black; 4.76% Hispanic; 0.55% Asian; 1.26% Native American; 0.06% Hawaiian/Pacific Islander
- Population (2020) • Voting age: 59,952; 43,971
- Website: Official website
- Notes: North-central Wisconsin

The 69th Assembly district of Wisconsin is one of 99 districts in the Wisconsin State Assembly. Located in north-central Wisconsin, the district comprises all of Clark County and parts of western Marathon County, southeast Taylor County, and southeast Chippewa County. It includes the cities of Abbotsford, Colby, Greenwood, Loyal, Medford, Neillsville, Owen, Thorp, and Stanley, and the villages of Athens, Boyd, Curtiss, Dorchester, Granton, Stetsonville, Unity, and Withee. The district is represented by Republican Karen Hurd, since January 2025; Hurd previously represented the 68th district from 2023 to 2025.

The 69th Assembly district is located within Wisconsin's 23rd Senate district, along with the 67th and 68th Assembly districts.

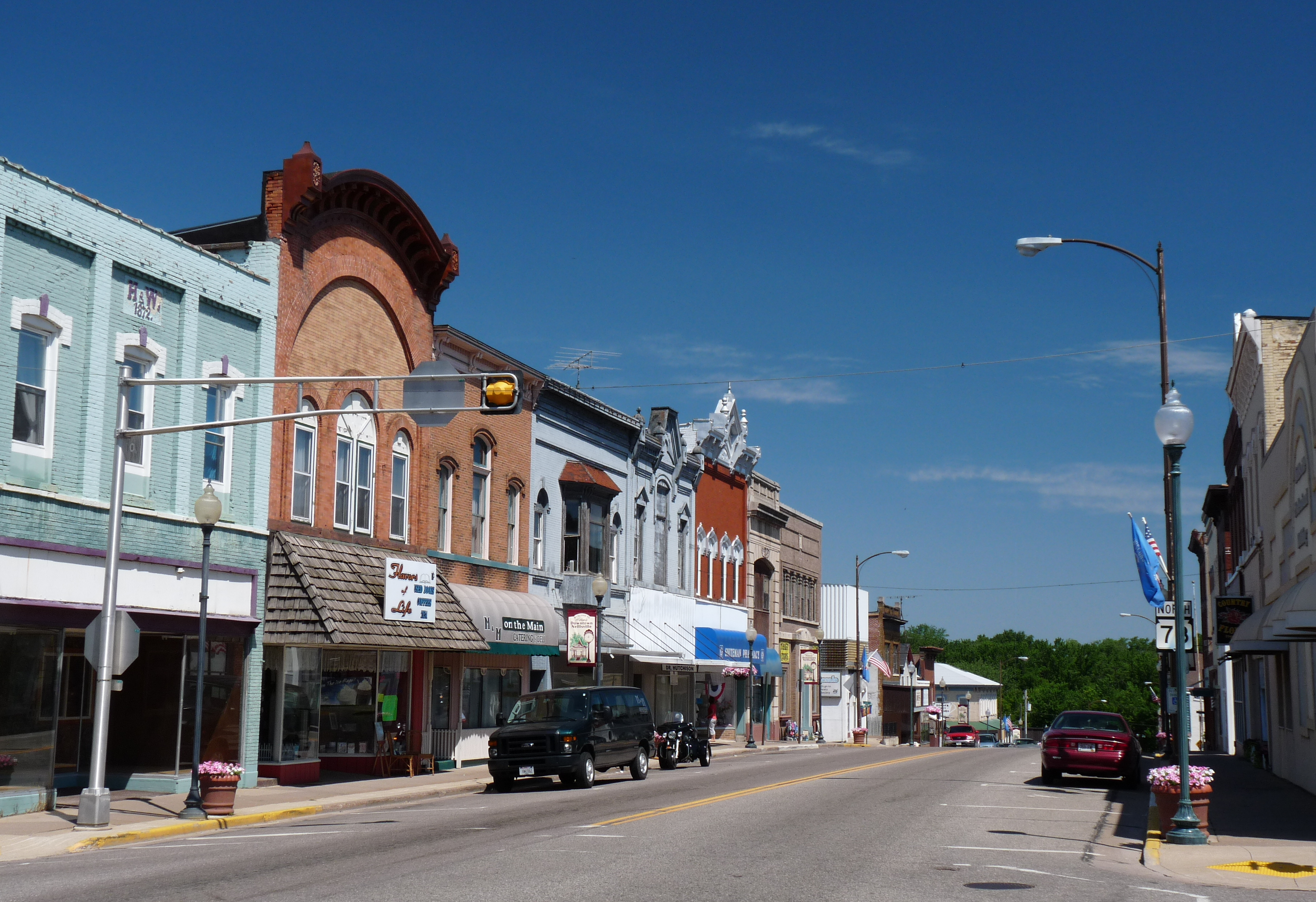
Neillsville Downtown Historic District

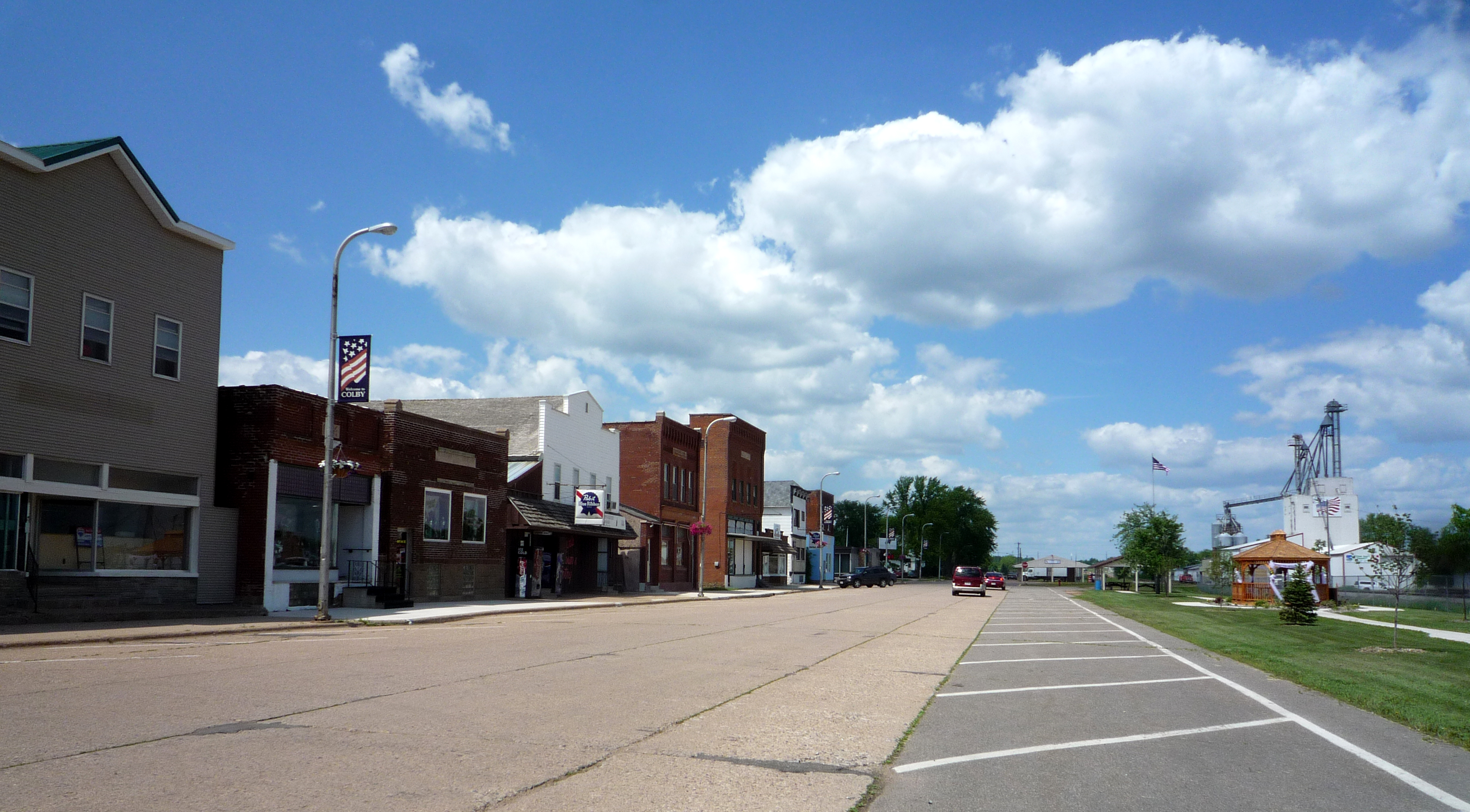
Downtown Colby

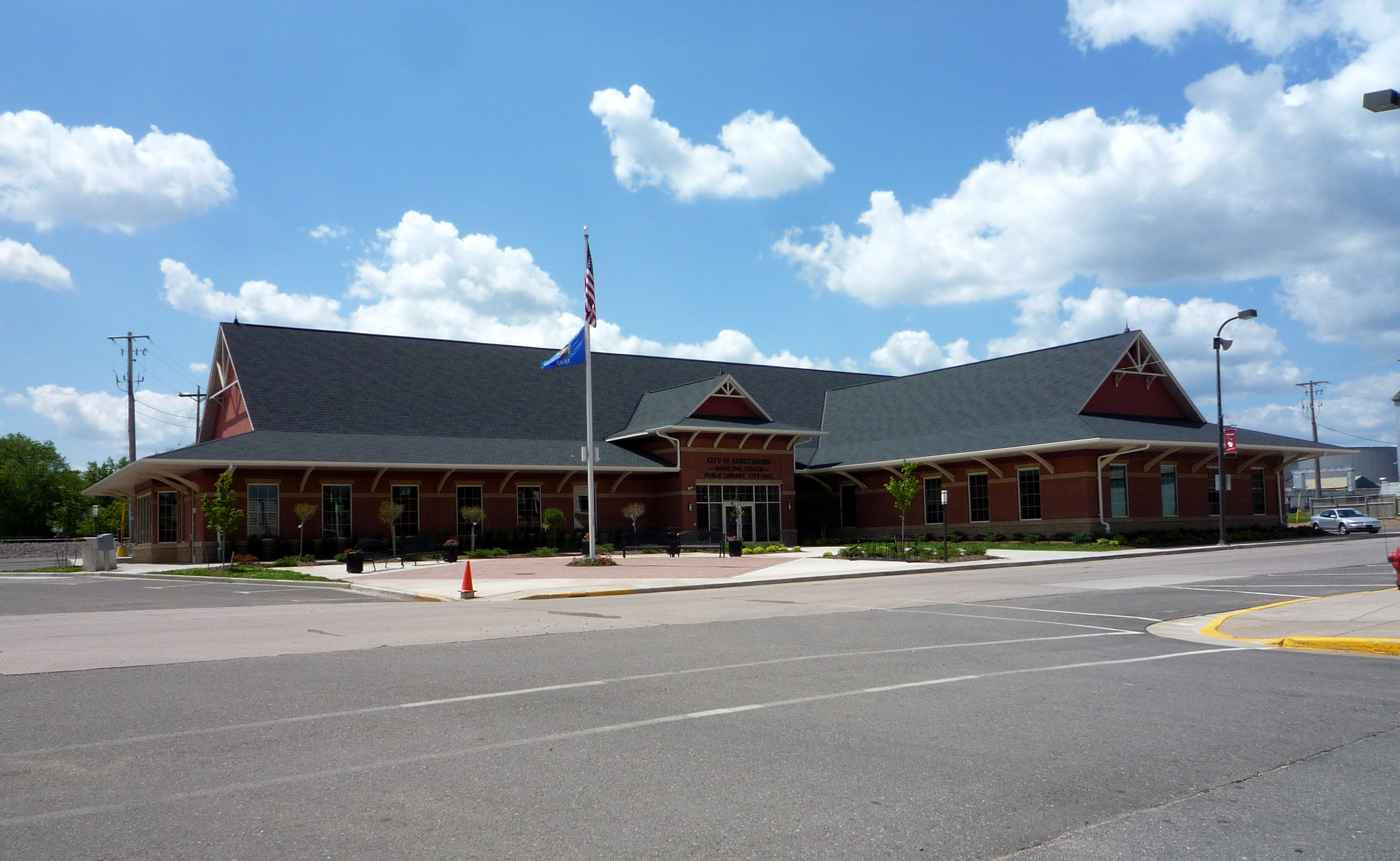
Abbotsford Municipal Center

== List of past representatives ==
List of representatives to the Wisconsin State Assembly from the 69th district
Member	Party	Residence	Counties represented	Term start	Term end	Ref.
District created
Alvin Baldus	Dem.	Menomonie	Dunn, Eau Claire, Pepin	January 1, 1973	January 6, 1975	
La Verne Ausman	Rep.	Elk Mound	Dunn, Eau Claire, Pepin	January 6, 1975	January 1, 1979	
Richard Shoemaker	Dem.	Menomonie	Dunn, Eau Claire, Pepin	January 1, 1979	January 3, 1983	
Lolita Schneiders	Rep.	Menomonee Falls	Washington, Waukesha	January 3, 1983	January 7, 1985	
Heron Van Gorden	Rep.	Neillsville	Clark, Marathon, Taylor	January 7, 1985	January 4, 1993	
Robert K. Zukowski	Rep.	Thorp	Clark, Eau Claire, Marathon	January 4, 1993	January 3, 1999	
Scott Suder	Rep.	Abbotsford	Chippewa, Clark, Eau Claire, Marathon, Taylor, Wood	January 3, 1999	September 3, 2013	
--Vacant--			Clark, Marathon, Wood	September 3, 2013	December 4, 2013	
Bob Kulp	Rep.	Stratford	Clark, Marathon, Wood	December 4, 2013	January 4, 2021	
Donna Rozar	Rep.	Marshfield	Clark, Marathon, Wood	January 4, 2021	January 6, 2025	
Donna Rozar	Rep.	Marshfield	Clark, Jackson, Marathon, Wood	January 4, 2021	January 6, 2025	
Karen Hurd	Rep.	Thorp	Chippewa, Clark, Marathon, Taylor	January 6, 2025	Current	
