= Donna Rozar =

American politician

Donna M. Rozar
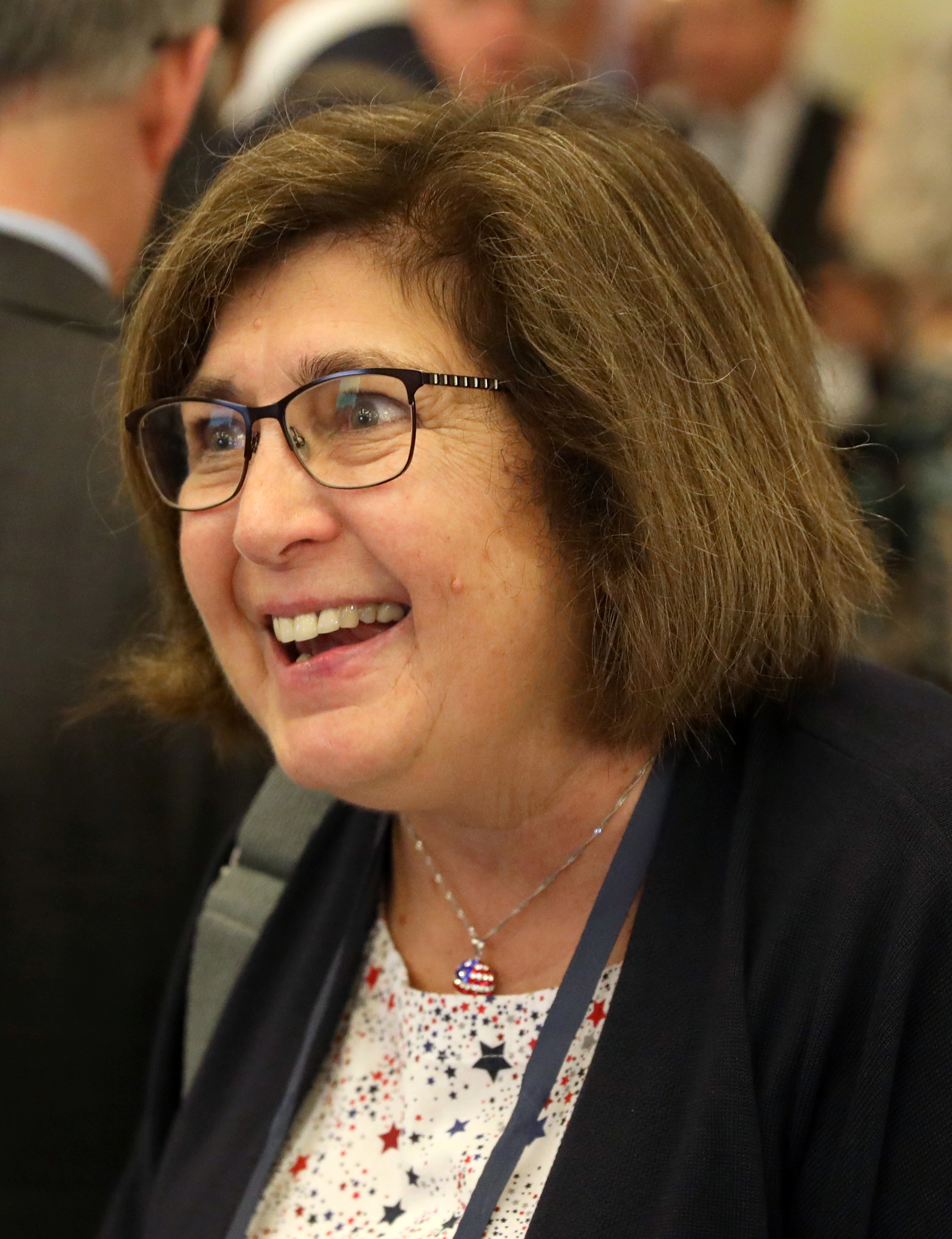

Member of the Wisconsin State Assembly from the 69th district
- In office January 4, 2021 – January 6, 2025
- Preceded by: Bob Kulp
- Succeeded by: Karen Hurd

Member of the Board of Supervisors of Wood County, Wisconsin, from the 2nd district
- Incumbent
- Assumed office April 2000
- Preceded by: Donald Olson

Personal details
- Born: Donna Kay Mummau; February 9, 1950 (age 76) Lancaster, Pennsylvania, U.S.
- Party: Republican
- Spouses: Grady Edward "Ed" Rozar Jr. (m. 1975; died 1993); Micheal J. Masanz (m. 1997; ann. 2002)
- Children: 5
- Education: Virginia Baptist Hospital School of Nursing; University of Tennessee (B.S.N.); Viterbo University (M.S.N.)
- Profession: nurse, politician
- Website: Campaign website

Donna Mummau Rozar (née Mummau; born February 9, 1950) is an American businesswoman, nurse, and Republican politician from Marshfield, Wisconsin. She served two terms as a member of the Wisconsin State Assembly, representing Wisconsin's 69th Assembly district from 2021 to 2025. She is also a member of the board of supervisors of Wood County, Wisconsin, since 2000.

== Early life and career ==
Donna Rozar was born Donna Kay Mummau in Lancaster, Pennsylvania, and moved with her parents to Orange County, Virginia, where her father had purchased a farm. She grew up on the farm and graduated from Orange County High School in 1968. In 1971, she earned her nursing diploma from the Virginia Baptist Hospital School of Nursing, in Lynchburg, Virginia. She then worked a year as an emergency room nurse at the University of Virginia Hospital in Charlottesville, where she earned her nurse practitioner certificate. For the next five years, she worked as a nurse practitioner at Norfolk General Hospital, where she met her future husband, Dr. Ed Rozar. Donna Rozar held a certificate as a nurse practitioner from 1971-1977 in Virginia, and has never held prescriptive authority. Her nursing license expired in Wisconsin in 2022 and she no longer holds an active nursing license.

She married Rozar in 1975 in Orange, Virginia, and moved with him to Knoxville, Tennessee. There she attended the University of Tennessee and earned her bachelor's degree in nursing in 1981. The couple moved frequently, living in Dallas, Texas, Pittsburgh, Pennsylvania, and Morgantown, West Virginia, over the next decade, adopting children along the way. They finally moved to Marshfield, Wisconsin, in 1988, where Ed was diagnosed with HIV/AIDS in 1989. Ed, a cardiothoracic surgeon, chose to retire from his practice to avoid accidentally exposing anyone else to the virus.

Following Ed's diagnosis, the Rozars appeared on The TODAY Show and Good Morning America to share their story; after Ed's death in 1993, Donna Rozar became a national speaker on AIDS awareness.

In the 1990s, she also owned and operated Town & Country Ventures LLC, through which she invested in and managed a number of commercial and residential properties.

== Political career ==
Aside from AIDS awareness, Rozar became an outspoken supporter of pro-life causes, which led her into Republican Party politics in Wisconsin in the 1990s.

Rozar first ran for elected office in 1994, when she challenged 20-year incumbent Democratic state representative Donald W. Hasenohrl for his seat in the Wisconsin State Assembly. Hasenohrl prevailed in the general election, but the margin—667 votes—was his closest contest since 1978.

Less than four months later, in February 1995, Rozar jumped into another campaign, running in the special election in the 24th State Senate district to replace state senator David Helbach, who resigned unexpectedly at the beginning of the 1995–1996 term. Again, Rozar was defeated, taking just 43% of the vote in the May 1995 special election.

In 1996, Rozar made another attempt at elected office, once again challenging state representative Donald Hasenohrl in the 70th assembly district. In November, Rozar fell short again, this time winning just 39% of the vote.

After 1996, Rozar took a brief pause from seeking elected office, but remained active politically as an officer in the Republican Party of Wood County and as president of the Marshfield Woman's Club. Additionally, Rozar served on state and local commissions by appointment. Governor Tommy Thompson appointed her to the state Examining Board of Architects, Landscape Architects, Professional Geologists, Professional Engineers, Designers, and Land Surveyors in 1996; the Marshfield City Council appointed her to the local Cable Committee in 1997. She also became associated with a local organization known as People Interested in Clean Air, which pressed the city of Marshfield for a ban on smoking in restaurants.

In April 2000, Rozar achieved her first elected office when she was elected to the Wood County Board of Supervisors, though she did not face an opponent in the race. A month later, at the Republican congressional district caucuses, Rozar was elected as a delegate supporting George W. Bush for the 2000 Republican National Convention. Rozar ran for a seat on the Marshfield Common Council in 2001, but fell 100 votes short of her opponent.

In 2003, the 24th senate district became vacant again when state senator Kevin Shibilski was appointed Secretary of Tourism in the newly inaugurated administration of Governor Jim Doyle. Rozar again sought the seat, but was once again defeated, this time receiving less than 30% in the April special election.

Following her loss in 2003, Rozar returned to nursing full time in 2003, working as a cardiac medical-surgical nurse at St. Joseph's Hospital in Chippewa Falls, Wisconsin, and then at Marshfield Medical Center. She also pursued her master's in nursing from Viterbo University, completing the degree program in 2008. She served as an instructor at the Marshfield satellite campus of University of Wisconsin–Eau Claire, but retired in 2020.

In 2020, state representative Bob Kulp announced he would not seek another term in the Assembly in 2020. In April 2020, after winning reelection to her 11th term on the Wood County Board, Rozar announced she would be a candidate for Wisconsin State Assembly in the 69th district. She faced a crowded Republican primary field, but prevailed over her three opponents with 53% of the primary vote. In the general election she faced Brian Giles, a truck driver and first-time candidate. In November, she won 65% of the vote and, on her fifth attempt, was elected to the Wisconsin Legislature.

After the 2024 redistricting, Rozar was drawn out of her 69th Assembly district seat. Under the new plan, she faced an incumbent-vs-incumbent primary election against John Spiros in the new 86th Assembly district. Spiros prevailed in the primary with 43% of the vote, with a third candidate, Trine Spindler, receiving 25%.

== Personal life and family ==
Donna Kay Mummau took the last name Rozar when she married Dr. Ed Rozar in 1993. Together they adopted five children who are now grown. Ed was a medical doctor and contracted HIV from a patient sometime in the mid 1980s. He died of AIDS-related complications in 1993.

Donna remarried in December 1997 to Michael J. Masanz, but the marriage was annulled five years later.

She is a member of the Wisconsin Nursing Association, the American Nursing Association, the American Nurses Credentialing Center, and the Sigma Theta Tau nursing honor society.

== Electoral history ==
=== Wisconsin Assembly, 70th district (1994, 1996) ===
Year	Election	Date	Elected				Defeated				Total	Plurality
1994	General	Nov. 8	Don Hasenohrl (inc.)	Democratic	8,193	51.01%	Donna M. Rozar	Rep.	7,526	46.86%	16,060	667
1994	General	Nov. 8	Don Hasenohrl (inc.)	Democratic	8,193	51.01%	Wayne Wiedeman	Tax.	341	2.12%	16,060	667
1996	Primary	Sep. 10	Donna M. Rozar	Republican	2,273	63.65%	Thomas M. Liebe	Rep.	1,298	36.35%	3,571	975
1996	General	Nov. 5	Don Hasenohrl (inc.)	Democratic	12,957	60.96%	Donna M. Rozar	Rep.	8,298	39.04%	21,255	4,659

=== Wisconsin Senate (1995) ===
Year	Election	Date	Elected				Defeated				Total	Plurality
1995	Special	May. 2	Kevin Shibilski	Democratic	15,923	57.00%	Donna M. Rozar	Rep.	12,011	43.00%	27,934	3,912

=== Marshfield Common Council (2001) ===
Year	Election	Date	Elected				Defeated				Total	Plurality
2001	General	Apr. 3	Brad Parks	Nonpartisan	269	61.42%	Donna M. Rozar	Non.	169	38.58%	438	100

=== Wisconsin Senate (2003) ===
Year	Election	Date	Elected				Defeated				Total	Plurality
2003 (special)	Special	Apr. 29	Julie M. Lassa	Democratic	12,787	62.03%	Donna Rozar	Rep.	6,118	29.68%	20,613	6,669
2003 (special)	Special	Apr. 29	Julie M. Lassa	Democratic	12,787	62.03%	Jesse J. Higgins	Ind.	972	4.72%	20,613	6,669
2003 (special)	Special	Apr. 29	Julie M. Lassa	Democratic	12,787	62.03%	Jo Seiser	Grn.	720	3.49%	20,613	6,669

=== Wisconsin Assembly, 69th district (2020, 2022) ===
Year	Election	Date	Elected				Defeated				Total	Plurality
2020	Primary	Aug. 11	Donna M. Rozar	Republican	3,040	52.97%	Tim Miller	Rep.	1,550	27.01%	5,739	1,490
2020	Primary	Aug. 11	Donna M. Rozar	Republican	3,040	52.97%	Michael V. Smith	Rep.	906	15.79%	5,739	1,490
2020	Primary	Aug. 11	Donna M. Rozar	Republican	3,040	52.97%	Matthew F. Windheuser	Rep.	240	4.18%	5,739	1,490
2020	General	Nov. 3	Donna M. Rozar	Republican	18,568	65.85%	Brian Giles	Dem.	9,606	34.07%	28,197	8,962
2022	General	Nov. 8	Donna M. Rozar (inc)	Republican	15,032	64.27%	Lisa Boero	Dem.	8,345	35.68%	23,389	6,687

=== Wisconsin Assembly, 86th district (2024) ===
Year	Election	Date	Elected				Defeated				Total	Plurality
2024	Primary	Aug. 13	John Spiros (inc)	Republican	3,709	43.23%	Donna M. Rozar	Rep.	2,721	31.71%	8,580	988
2024	Primary	Aug. 13	John Spiros (inc)	Republican	3,709	43.23%	Trine Spindler	Rep.	2,143	24.98%	8,580	988

Wisconsin State Assembly
Preceded by Bob Kulp	Member of the Wisconsin State Assembly from the 69th district January 4, 2021 – January 6, 2025	Succeeded by Karen Hurd
