= Alvin Baldus =

20th century American politician

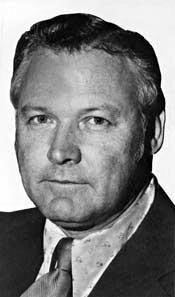

Member of the U.S. House of Representatives from Wisconsin's 3rd district
- In office January 3, 1975 – January 3, 1981
- Preceded by: Vernon Wallace Thomson
- Succeeded by: Steve Gunderson

Member of the Wisconsin State Assembly
- In office January 2, 1989 – January 6, 1997
- Preceded by: Richard Shoemaker
- Succeeded by: Joe Plouff
- Constituency: 29th Assembly district
- In office January 1, 1973 – January 6, 1975
- Preceded by: District established
- Succeeded by: La Verne Ausman
- Constituency: 69th Assembly district
- In office January 2, 1967 – January 1, 1973
- Preceded by: Francis L. Peterson
- Succeeded by: District abolished
- Constituency: Dunn County district

Personal details
- Born: April 27, 1926 Garner, Iowa, U.S.
- Died: February 2, 2017 (aged 90) Menomonie, Wisconsin, U.S.
- Resting place: Saint Josephs Cemetery, Menomonie
- Party: Democratic
- Spouse: Anna Lorayne Reiten (m. 1959–2017)
- Children: 5
- Occupation: Investment broker, insurance broker, politician, lobbyist

Military service
- Allegiance: United States
- Branch/service: United States Army
- Years of service: 1951–1953
- Unit: 2nd Div. U.S. Infantry
- Battles/wars: Korean War

Alvin James "Al" Baldus (April 27, 1926 – February 2, 2017) was an American businessman, lobbyist, and Democratic politician from Dunn County, Wisconsin. He served three terms in the U.S. House of Representatives, representing Wisconsin's 3rd congressional district from 1975 to 1981. He also served 16 years in the Wisconsin State Assembly (1967–1975 & 1989–1997).

== Early and career ==
Born in Garner, Iowa, Baldus graduated from high school in Elkton, Minnesota, and went to Riverland Community College (formerly Austin Junior College) in Austin, Minnesota.

He was in the United States Merchant Marine from 1944 to 1946 and the United States Army, serving in the Korean War from 1951 to 1953.

In 1959, he wed Lorayne Reiten, to whom he would be married until his death in 2017.

He served in the Wisconsin State Assembly from 1966 to 1975 and again from 1989 to 1997.

== Congress ==
He served three terms in the United States House of Representatives from 1975 to 1981, representing Wisconsin's 3rd congressional district—the first Democrat to hold this seat in 66 years. He served as part of the 94th, 95th and 96th United States Congresses.

He ran unsuccessfully for reelection in 1980, losing to Republican Steve Gunderson.

== Personal life and family ==
Alvin Baldus married Anna Lorayne "Lolly" Reiten in 1959, at St. Joseph Catholic Church in Menomonie. They had six children together and were married for 58 years before his death in 2017. He died at his home in Menomonie, Wisconsin, on February 2, 2017, at age 90. He was buried at St Joseph's Catholic Church Cemetery.

Baldus' eldest daughter, Deb McGrath, ran for his former seat in the United States House of Representatives in the 2022 election, but lost in the Democratic primary to state senator Brad Pfaff.

Wisconsin State Assembly
Preceded by Francis L. Peterson	Member of the Wisconsin State Assembly from the Dunn County district January 2, 1967 – January 1, 1973	District abolished
District established by 1971 Wis. Act 304	Member of the Wisconsin State Assembly from the 69th district January 1, 1973 – January 6, 1975	Succeeded by La Verne Ausman
Preceded by Richard Shoemaker	Member of the Wisconsin State Assembly from the 29th district January 2, 1989 – January 6, 1997	Succeeded by Joe Plouff
U.S. House of Representatives
Preceded by Vernon Wallace Thomson	Member of the U.S. House of Representatives from Wisconsin's 3rd congressional district January 3, 1975 – January 3, 1981	Succeeded by Steve Gunderson
