= Henry Ausman =

American politician (1836–1924)

Henry Ausman (October 20, 1836 – December 4, 1924) was an American politician who served as a member of the Wisconsin State Assembly.

== Biography ==
Ausman was born in Germany on October 20, 1836 to John H. and Anna M. (Weigand) Ausman. He immigrated with his parents to Venango County (now Forest County) Pennsylvania in 1848. He moved to Dunn County, Wisconsin in 1860 and settled in Spring Brook, Wisconsin. Ausman worked for Knapp, Stout & Co. and farmed in the area before entering into various businesses. In 1865, he became an Evangelical minister.

On August 4, 1855, Ausman married Martha Elizabeth Sippel. They had eleven children. Ausman died on December 4, 1924.

Ausman's great grandson, La Verne Ausman, was a member of the Wisconsin State Assembly and an official in the Farmers Home Administration and the United States Department of Agriculture.

== Political career ==
Ausman represented Dunn County in Wisconsin's 32nd State Assembly in 1879. Other positions he held included Chairman (similar to mayor) and Town Treasurer of Elk Mound (town), Wisconsin and County Commissioner (similar to county supervisor) of Dunn County. He was a Republican.
