= Karen Hurd =

American politician (born 1958)

Member of the Wisconsin State Assembly
- Incumbent
- Assumed office January 6, 2025
- Preceded by: Donna Rozar
- Constituency: 69th district
- In office January 3, 2023 – January 6, 2025
- Preceded by: Jesse James
- Succeeded by: Rob Summerfield
- Constituency: 68th district

Personal details
- Born: Karen Ruth Willa; October 20, 1957 (age 68) Houston, Texas, U.S.
- Party: Republican
- Children: 5
- Education: Truman State University (BA); Huntington College of Health Sciences (Dip.); University of Saint Joseph (MS)
- Occupation: Nutritionist, writer, politician
- Website: Campaign website; Business website; Official website

Military service
- Allegiance: United States
- Branch/service: United States Army
- Years of service: 1980–1984
- Rank: Captain, USA
- Awards: Army Commendation Medal

Karen Ruth Hurd (née Willa; born 1958) is an American nutritionist, writer, and Republican politician from Clark County, Wisconsin. She is a member of the Wisconsin State Assembly, representing Wisconsin's 69th Assembly district since 2025; she previously represented the 68th Assembly district during the 2023–2024 term. She also previously served as a member of the village board of Fall Creek, Wisconsin.

== Biography ==
Karen Hurd was born Karen Willa in Texas. Her parents divorced when she was a child, and she moved to Missouri, where she graduated from Kirkwood High School in 1976. She went on to attend Truman State University, where she earned her bachelor's degree in 1980. While attending school, she was involved in the Reserve Officers' Training Corps and was commissioned a second lieutenant in the United States Army at the time she graduated from college. She served four years in the Army, and was discharged with the rank of captain in 1984. She received the Army Commendation Medal for outstanding service.

For the next several years after leaving the Army, she was focused on her growing family and resided in St. Louis, Missouri. In 1989, after her infant daughter was poisoned by a household pesticide (Organophosphate) she began studying alternative treatment options to help restore her daughter's health. She administered a nutrition plan, and the child recovered and grew to adulthood with no apparent ill effects.

The experience led her to pursue further education in nutrition and biology. She attended the American Academy of Nutrition (now Huntington University of Health Sciences) and received a diploma of comprehensive nutrition in 1994, after which she established a nutrition practice, Karen R. Hurd Nutrition Practice LLC.

In the late 1990s, she moved to Fall Creek, Wisconsin, with her family. She continued to pursue higher education, attending several courses at the University of Wisconsin–Eau Claire, and ultimately completed her master's degree in biochemistry in 2017 from the University of Saint Joseph (online).

She has been an outspoken advocate on nutrition issues, and has appeared on radio and speaking platforms to discuss her findings. She has also self-published three books on the subject and volumes of digital coursework.

She is currently pursuing a master's in public health from George Washington University (also online). She has also recently worked as a substitute teacher in the Fall Creek School System.

In addition to her pursuits in nutrition and medicine, Hurd has been a playwright since 1997 and has produced more than 40 plays and musicals through her Scene & Hurd Productions LLC production company. She also wrote and produced the feature film The Lumber Baron (2019) about a family lumber business in early 20th century Wisconsin. She has also published a long-running historical fiction column in a Wisconsin newspaper.

== Political career ==
Karen Hurd was elected to her first public office in 2021, when she joined the village board of trustees of Fall Creek.

The next year, incumbent Wisconsin state representative Jesse James announced he would run for Wisconsin State Senate, creating an open seat in the 68th Assembly district. Three days later, Hurd announced her candidacy for the Republican nomination to succeed James. Ultimately two other candidates would enter the Republican contest, but Hurd prevailed with 57% of the vote in the primary. She defeated Eau Claire County supervisor Nate Otto in the general election, receiving 61% of the vote.

== Personal life and family ==
Karen Willa was one of four children born to James L. Willa and his wife Betty (née Duncan). Though her parents divorced, they both ultimately ended up moving to western Wisconsin.

Karen Willa took the last name Hurd when she married Steven Hurd in 1978. She now resides alone in Fall Creek, Wisconsin, while Steven has been moved to the Heatherwood Assisted Living Facility in Eau Claire, Wisconsin; they have five adult children and four grandchildren.

== Electoral history ==
=== Wisconsin Assembly, 68th district (2022) ===
Year	Election	Date	Elected				Defeated				Total	Plurality
2022	Primary	Aug. 9	Karen Hurd	Republican	3,557	57.14%	Chris Connell	Rep.	1,451	23.31%	6,225	2,106
2022	Primary	Aug. 9	Karen Hurd	Republican	3,557	57.14%	Hillarie Roth	Rep.	1,207	19.39%	6,225	2,106
2022	General	Nov. 8	Karen Hurd	Republican	14,338	60.68%	Nate Otto	Dem.	9,273	39.25%	23,627	5,065

=== Wisconsin Assembly, 69th district (2024) ===
Year	Election	Date	Elected				Defeated				Total	Plurality
2024	Primary	Aug. 13	Karen Hurd	Republican	3,892	57.17%	Lori J. Voss	Rep.	2,909	42.73%	6,808	983
2024	General	Nov. 5	Karen Hurd	Republican	19,534	71.89%	Roger Halls	Dem.	6,565	24.16%	27,173	12,969
2024	General	Nov. 5	Karen Hurd	Republican	19,534	71.89%	Joshua Kelley	Ind.	1,058	3.89%	27,173	12,969

== Published works ==
- Hurd, Karen (2007). And They Said It Wasn't Possible. Trafford Publishing.
- Hurd, Karen (2009). The Bean Queen's Cookbook. Trafford Publishing.
- Hurd, Karen (2015). Mr. Sugar Comes to Call. Scene & Hurd Publications.

== See also ==
- The Lumber Baron
- Wisconsin State Assembly

Wisconsin State Assembly
Preceded by Jesse James	Member of the Wisconsin State Assembly from the 68th district January 3, 2023 – January 6, 2025	Succeeded by Rob Summerfield
Preceded by Donna Rozar	Member of the Wisconsin State Assembly from the 69th district January 6, 2025 – present	Incumbent
