= La Verne Ausman =

American politician (1930–2021)

Administrator of the Farmers Home Administration
- In office March 13, 1990 – January 20, 1993
- President: George H. W. Bush
- Preceded by: Vance Clark
- Succeeded by: Dallas Tonsager

4th Secretary of the Wisconsin Department of Agriculture, Trade and Consumer Protection
- In office November 1, 1981 – December 19, 1985
- Governor: Lee S. Dreyfus; Tony Earl
- Preceded by: Joseph Tuss (acting)
- Succeeded by: John Cottingham (acting)

Member of the Wisconsin State Assembly from the 69th district
- In office January 6, 1975 – January 1, 1979
- Preceded by: Alvin Baldus
- Succeeded by: Richard Shoemaker

Personal details
- Born: February 18, 1930 Eau Claire, Wisconsin, U.S.
- Died: December 14, 2021 (aged 91) Eau Claire, Wisconsin, U.S.
- Resting place: Evergreen Cemetery, Elk Mound, Wisconsin
- Party: Republican
- Education: University of Wisconsin–Madison
- Occupation: Farmer

La Verne George Ausman (February 18, 1930 – December 14, 2021) was an American farmer and Republican politician from Dunn County, Wisconsin. He served as administrator of the U.S. Farmers Home Administration during the presidency of George H. W. Bush, and was the 4th secretary of the Wisconsin Department of Agriculture, Trade and Consumer Protection. He also served two terms in the Wisconsin State Assembly, representing the 69th Assembly district.

== Biography ==
Ausman was born on February 18, 1930, in Eau Claire, Wisconsin, to George and Anna (Sorenson) Ausman. After graduating from Elk Mound High School in Elk Mound, Wisconsin, he attended the farm short course at University of Wisconsin–Madison in 1949. Ausman was a farmer and cattle breeder.

== Political career ==
Ausman was a Republican.

He served as the Elk Mound town supervisor from 1961 to 1965. He was a director of the Tri-State Breeders Cooperative from 1961 to 1968 and became president in 1969. From 1971 to 1975, Ausman served as chairman of the Agency No. 5 school committee.

Ausman represented the 69th Assembly District in the Wisconsin State Assembly in 1975 and 1977. From 1981 to 1986, Ausman served as secretary of the Wisconsin Department of Agriculture, Trade, and Consumer Protection. From 1987 to 1989, he served as under deputy secretary for small communities and rural development in the Department of Agriculture. From 1989 to 1993, he served as administrator of the Farmers Home Administration of the United States Department of Agriculture during the administration of President George H. W. Bush.

In 2006, Ausman received an Aggie Award at the 43rd annual Eau Claire Farm Show in recognition of his more than 50 years of service to farmers and agri-businesses.

His great grandfather, Henry Ausman, represented Dunn County in the 32nd Wisconsin Legislature in 1879.

Wisconsin State Assembly
Preceded by Alvin Baldus	Member of the Wisconsin State Assembly from the 69th district January 6, 1975 – January 1, 1979	Succeeded by Richard Shoemaker
Government offices
Preceded by Joseph Tuss (acting)	Secretary of the Wisconsin Department of Agriculture, Trade and Consumer Protection; November 1, 1981 – December 19, 1985	Succeeded by John Cottingham (acting)
Preceded by Vance Clark	Administrator of the Farmers Home Administration; March 13, 1990 – January 20, 1993	Succeeded by Dallas Tonsager
