= Taylor County Airport (Wisconsin) =

- IATA: MDF; ICAO: KMDZ; FAA LID: MDZ

Summary
- Airport type: Public
- Owner: Taylor County
- Location: Medford, Wisconsin
- Opened: October 1965
- Time zone: CST (UTC−06:00)
  - Summer (DST): CDT (UTC−05:00)
- Elevation AMSL: 1,478 ft / 450 m
- Coordinates: 45°06′05″N 090°18′01″W
- Website: co.taylor.wi.us/...

Map
- Location of airport in Wisconsin MDZ (the United States)

Runways
Direction	Length		Surface
Direction	ft	m	Surface
9/27	6,000	1,829	Asphalt
16/34	4,435	1,352	Asphalt

Statistics
- Aircraft operations (2022): 7,020
- Based aircraft (2024): 15
- Source: Federal Aviation Administration

Taylor County Airport (IATA: MDF, ICAO: KMDZ, FAA LID: MDZ) is a county-owned public-use airport located three nautical miles (6 km) southeast of the central business district of Medford, a city in Taylor County, Wisconsin, United States.

It is included in the Federal Aviation Administration (FAA) National Plan of Integrated Airport Systems for 2025–2029, in which it is categorized as a local general aviation facility. Although no commercial airlines service the airport, it does serve general aviation traffic including business and leisure fliers. Hangars are available for lease and fuel is also available.

Although most U.S. airports use the same three-letter location identifier for the FAA and IATA, this airport is assigned MDZ by the FAA and MDF by the IATA (which assigned MDZ to El Plumerillo Airport in Mendoza, Argentina).

== Facilities and aircraft ==
Taylor County Airport covers an area of 567 acres (229 ha) at an elevation of 1,478 feet (450 m) above mean sea level. It has two asphalt paved runways: the primary runway 9/27 is 6,000 by 100 feet (1,829 x 30m) with approved GPS approaches and the crosswind runway 16/34 is 4,435 by 75 feet (1,352 x 23 m) also with approved GPS approaches.

For the 12-month period ending September 22, 2022, the airport had 7,020 aircraft operations, an average of 19 per day: 93% general aviation, 7% air taxi and less than 1% military. In July 2024, there were 15 aircraft based at this airport: all 15 single-engine.

== See also ==
- List of airports in Wisconsin
