= Stephanie Klett =

5th Secretary of the Wisconsin Department of Tourism
- In office January 3, 2011 – January 7, 2019
- Appointed by: Scott Walker
- Preceded by: Kelli Trumble
- Succeeded by: Sara Meaney

Personal details
- Born: February 26, 1967 (age 59) Beloit, Wisconsin, U.S.
- Education: Beloit College

Stephanie Ann Klett is an American broadcast personality and marketing professional from Beloit, Wisconsin. She was the 5th secretary of the Wisconsin Department of Tourism, serving for the entire administration of Governor Scott Walker, from 2011 to 2019. Since leaving government, she is president and C.E.O. of Visit Lake Geneva, a non-profit funded by the business community of Lake Geneva, Wisconsin, to market the region for tourism and conventions.

== Biography ==
A graduate from Beloit College in 1989, Klett served as Miss Wisconsin in 1992. Klett included her “Attitude on AIDS” campaign as a part of her platform and reached more than 53,000 teens during 1992-93 with messages designed to separate HIV/AIDS myths from facts.

She was the host of the longest-running tourism TV show in the U.S., Discover Wisconsin, from 1993 to 2011, and continues to guest host the show. Klett received the 2009-2010 Emmy for “Outstanding Achievement for Individual Excellence On Camera.”

In 1993 she became the Founder and, until 2013, was President of Spotlight on Wisconsin, Inc., an organization which raised money and awareness for the work of the AIDS Resource Center of Wisconsin, Beloit Regional Hospice and the Stateline Boys and Girls Clubs. Klett has also coordinated the Aids Walk Wisconsin for the past several years and was named as its honorary chairperson.

On January 3, 2011, she was appointed as Secretary of the Wisconsin Department of Tourism by Governor Scott Walker. Klett served in the position until January 2019, and previously served as a board member for the Wisconsin State Fair.

Klett was named as one of the “Top Women in Travel" and was one of four tourism professionals from around the world honored for “Outstanding Women in Destination Management/Marketing” by Women in Travel and Tourism International (WITTI).

On March 6, 2019, Klett was named President and CEO of Visit Lake Geneva and assumed the position on April 8, 2019.

Awards and achievements
Preceded by Brenda Jo Haines	Miss Wisconsin; 1992	Succeeded by Tania Elizabeth Ziegler
