= Clinton Textor =

American politician

Clinton Textor (October 4, 1856 – February 8, 1943) was an American politician and jurist.

Born in Milwaukee, Wisconsin, Textor received his law degree from University of Wisconsin Law School in 1880. Textor lived in Milwaukee County, Wisconsin. In 1883, Textor moved to Medford, Wisconsin to practice law and was elected Taylor County judge. He also served as mayor of Medford. In 1891, Textor was elected to the Wisconsin State Assembly and was a Democratic. In 1941, Clinton was taken to a hospital in Chicago, Illinois after he was found wandering through The Loop district. Textor apparently had amnesia and had been living in Chicago since 1939. He was discharged from the hospital when a daughter-in-law came to get him. Textor died at an old peoples home in Bensenville, Illinois as a result of a fall and injuries to his hip.
