= Jim Holperin =

American politician

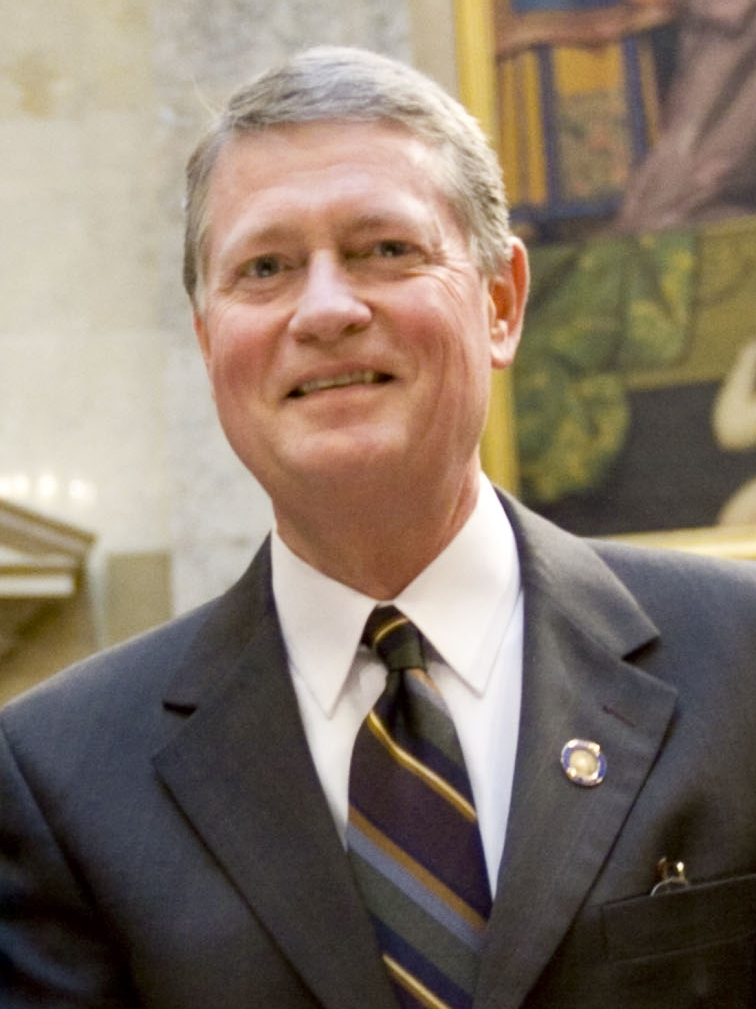
- Holperin in 2009

Member of the Wisconsin Senate from the 12th district
- In office January 3, 2009 – January 7, 2013
- Preceded by: Roger Breske
- Succeeded by: Tom Tiffany

3rd Secretary of the Wisconsin Department of Tourism
- In office May 12, 2003 – January 3, 2007
- Governor: Jim Doyle
- Preceded by: Kevin Shibilski
- Succeeded by: Kelli A. Trumble

Member of the Wisconsin State Assembly
- In office January 7, 1985 – January 2, 1995
- Preceded by: John Medinger
- Succeeded by: Joe Handrick
- Constituency: 34th Assembly district
- In office January 3, 1983 – January 7, 1985
- Preceded by: Thomas A. Loftus
- Succeeded by: Thomas A. Loftus
- Constituency: 46th Assembly district

Personal details
- Born: December 18, 1950 (age 75) Eagle River, Wisconsin, U.S.
- Party: Democratic
- Education: University of Wisconsin–Whitewater (BS)

James C. Holperin (born December 18, 1950) is a retired American politician from Vilas County, Wisconsin. He represented northern Wisconsin for 16 years in the Wisconsin Legislature, serving 4 years in the Wisconsin Senate (2009–2012) and 12 years in the State Assembly (1983–1995). He also served as secretary of the Wisconsin Department of Tourism during the first term of Governor Jim Doyle, from 2003 to 2007. He is the only state legislator in history to face two recall elections (1990 and 2011), surviving both.

== Early life and education ==
Holperin was born in Eagle River, Wisconsin, on December 18, 1950. In 1969, he graduated from Eagle River High School (now known as Northland Pines High School). In 1973, he earned a B.S. from the University of Wisconsin-Whitewater.

== Career ==
He served for nine years (1994-2003) as the director of Trees For Tomorrow, a natural resources specialty school focused primarily on conservation education for young people.

=== Assembly ===
In 1982, he successfully ran for the 46th District seat in the Wisconsin State Assembly representing Oneida and Vilas Counties. He served on the budget committee and the Joint Committee on Finance. After redistricting based on the 1980 Census, Holperin's district was re-designated as the 34th. In 1990, Holperin faced a recall effort due to his support for Native American treaty rights. At the center of the dispute was the controversy over the treaties between the federal government and the Chippewa tribe, in which the tribe ceded vast lands in northern Wisconsin in exchange for spearfishing, hunting, and timber harvesting rights. Holperin won the recall election handily, winning 61% of the vote. He retired in 1994. He was succeeded by Republican Joe Handrick.

=== Senate ===
In 2003, Governor Jim Doyle appointed him as Secretary of the Wisconsin Department of Tourism. In 2008, he ran to become a State Senator when incumbent Democratic Wisconsin State Senator Roger Breske decided to retire after four-plus terms (1990–2008). He defeated Republican nominee Tom Tiffany with 51% of the vote.

==== 2011 Union protests ====
During the 2011 protests in Wisconsin, Holperin, along with the 13 other Democratic State Senators, left the state on February 17 to deny the State Senate a quorum on Governor Scott Walker's controversial budget repair bill. On March 9, Republicans in the State Senate declared that they had removed all fiscal provisions from the fiscal repair bill and passed it without needing a quorum. On March 12, Holperin and the rest of the Democratic Senators returned to Wisconsin.

==== 2011 attempted recall ====
Holperin was one of three Democratic state senators facing recall as a result of the 2011 Wisconsin protests. On February 22, 2011, the "Jim Holperin Recall Committee" officially registered with the Wisconsin Government Accountability Board. 15,960 valid signatures of electors residing within the 12th District were required by April 25, 2011, to generate a recall election.

On March 10, 2011, supporters of the recall effort against Holperin complained of intimidation by his supporters. On April 21, 2011, Holperin recall supporters filed about 23,300 signatures on recall petitions.

Holperin and Kim Simac faced off in the general recall election on August 16, 2011. Holperin won, keeping his seat.

==== Election 2012 ====
In March 2012, with his district having been drastically revised by the legislature, Holperin announced he would not seek re-election in 2012. He was succeeded in the new 12th District by Republican Tom Tiffany.

Wisconsin State Assembly
Preceded by Thomas A. Loftus	Member of the Wisconsin State Assembly from the 46th district January 3, 1983 – January 7, 1985	Succeeded by Thomas A. Loftus
Preceded by John Medinger	Member of the Wisconsin State Assembly from the 34th district January 7, 1985 – January 2, 1995	Succeeded by Joe Handrick
Wisconsin Senate
Preceded by Roger Breske	Member of the Wisconsin Senate from the 12th district January 3, 2009 – January 7, 2013	Succeeded by Tom Tiffany
Government offices
Preceded by Kevin Shibilski	Secretary of the Wisconsin Department of Tourism; May 12, 2003 – January 3, 2007	Succeeded by Kelli A. Trumble
