= WKEB =

- Medford, Wisconsin; United States
- Broadcast area: Medford, Wisconsin
- Frequency: 99.3 MHz
- Branding: K99

Programming
- Format: Adult hits
- Affiliations: ABC Radio

Ownership
- Owner: WIGM, Incorporated
- Sister stations: WIGM

History
- First air date: 1968 (as WIGM-FM)
- Former call signs: WIGM-FM (1968–1997)

Technical information
- Licensing authority: FCC
- Facility ID: 72385
- Class: C3
- ERP: 23,000 watts
- HAAT: 104 meters
- Transmitter coordinates: 45°9′51.00″N 90°20′28.00″W

Links
- Public license information: Public file; LMS
- Webcast: Listen Live
- Website: k99wigm.com

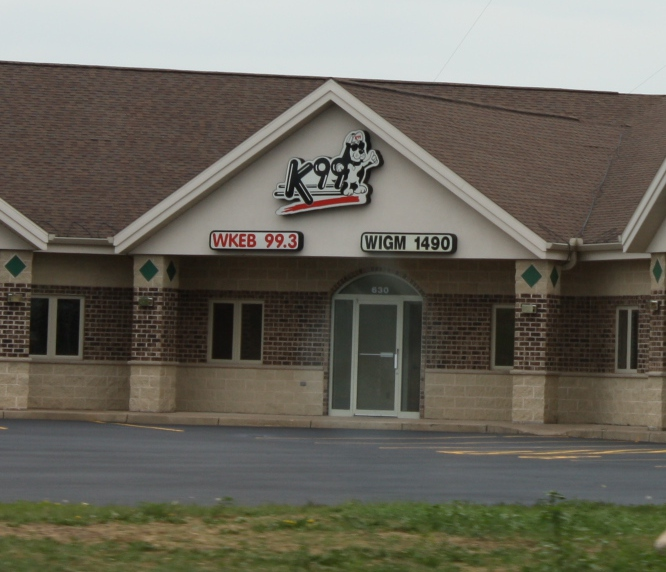
WKEB / WIGM studios

WKEB (99.3 FM) is a radio station, licensed to Medford, Wisconsin, United States, that broadcasts an adult hits music format from a tower just north of the city. The station is currently owned by WIGM, Incorporated, and features programming from ABC Radio.

== History ==
The station was assigned call sign WIGM-FM on December 31, 1968. On July 11, 1997, the station changed its call sign to the current WKEB.
