= Michelle Curran =

United States Air Force officer

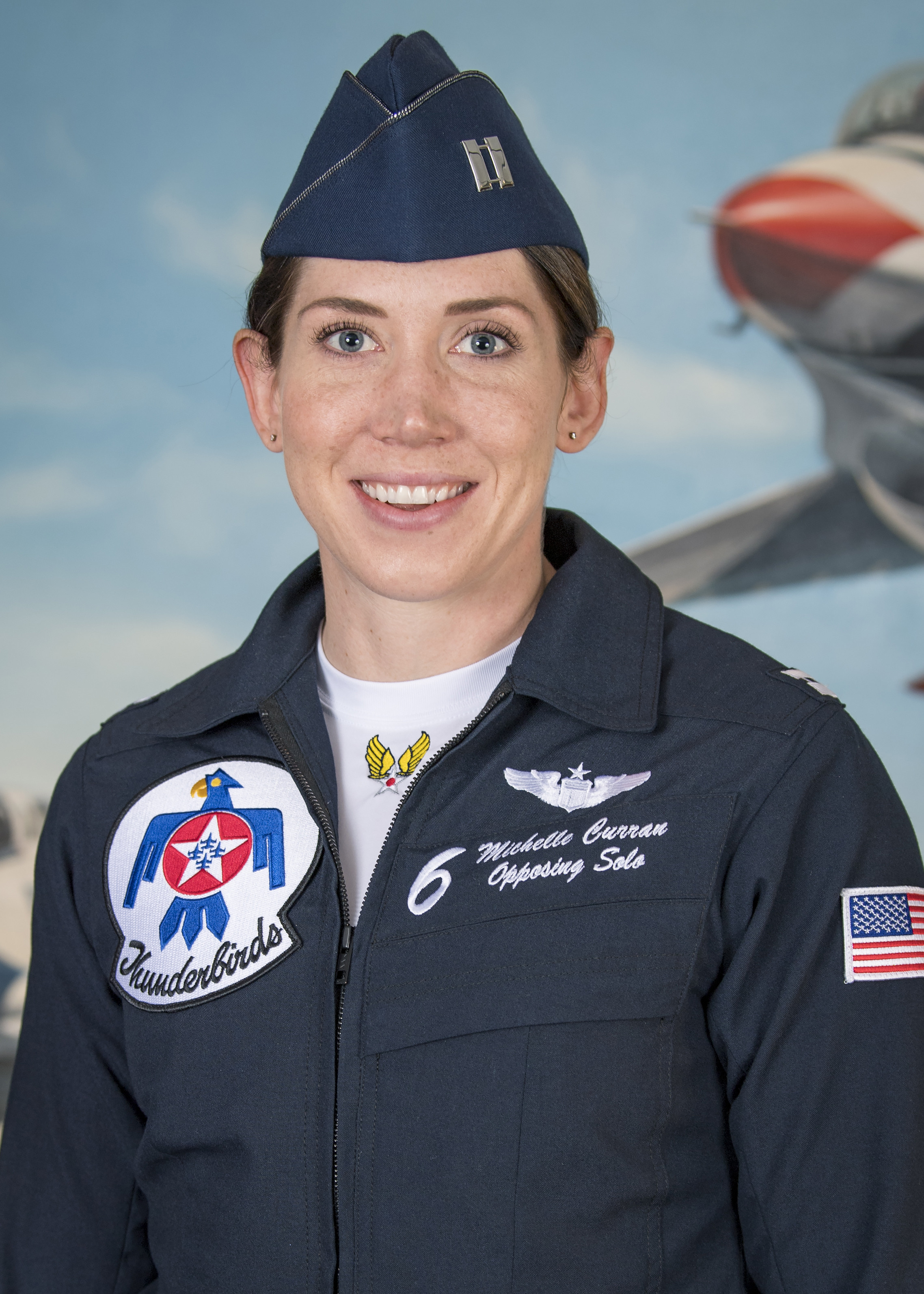
- Curran in 2019
- Born: 1987 (age 38–39); Medford, Wisconsin, U.S.
- Military career
- Allegiance: United States of America
- Branch: United States Air Force
- Service years: 2009-2021
- Rank: Major
- Unit: Thunderbirds

Michelle Curran (born 1987) is a veteran United States Air Force (USAF) major and a pilot in the USAF Air Demonstration Squadron, or Thunderbirds. Curran was the lead solo pilot for the Squadron. Curran is the fifth woman to fly with the Thunderbirds, her callsign (or nickname) is "MACE".

== Early life ==
Curran was born in Medford, Wisconsin. She studied criminal justice at the University of St. Thomas and competed in a number of sports there. Curran was also active in Air Force Reserve Officer Training Corps (AFROTC) at St. Thomas.

== Air Force career ==
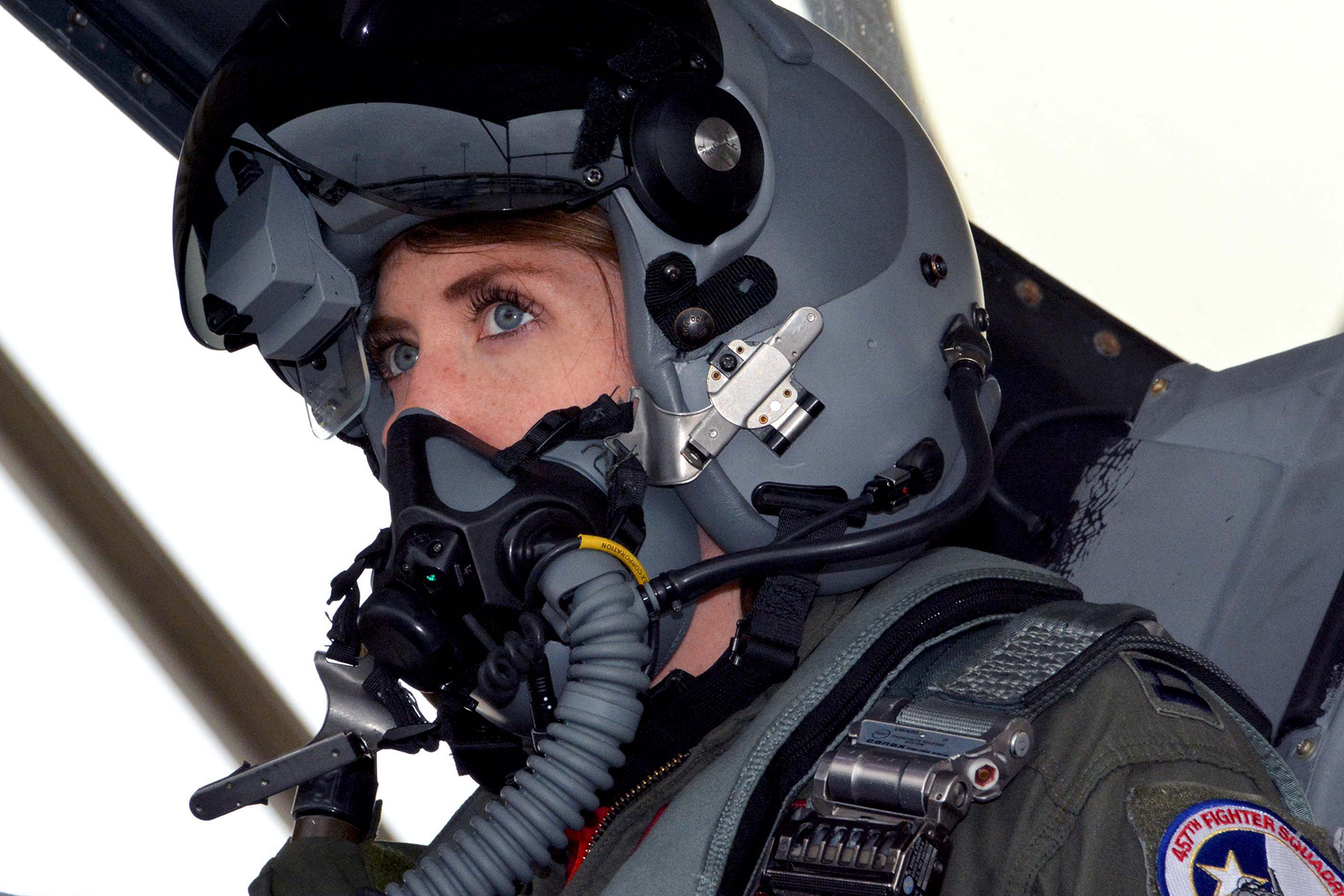
Curran, while a captain, as an F-16 pilot with the 355th Fighter Squadron

Curran began service in the United States Air Force in 2009, earning a commission through the AFROTC. Her first two years with the USAF were spent in pilot training with the 14th Operations Group at Columbus Air Force Base in Mississippi. Her next year was spent as an F-16 Fighting Falcon student with the 308th Fighter Squadron at Luke Air Force Base in Arizona. Curran then spent three years at Misawa Air Base in northern Japan. Curran later worked for three years as an F-16 instructor in the 355th Fighter Squadron at NAS JRB Fort Worth in Texas. She was the first woman to fly as part of the 335th FS.

Curran joined the Thunderbirds in 2019 and left the team in December 2021, after serving a three-year tour on the team. Curran Served as the opposing solo pilot in 2019, and the lead solo pilot in 2020 and 2021, flying on the outer-left wing of the Delta formation of six F-16s. Major Curran was participating in the Operation America Strong flyovers the Thunderbirds did with the Blue Angels, the demonstration squadron of the United States Navy, during the COVID-19 pandemic. Curran was the only female pilot flying with the squadron when she served, and the fifth female pilot in the squadron overall.

Curran has logged over 1,500 total flight hours with the USAF. She served in Afghanistan for two months in 2016 as part of both Operation Freedom's Sentinel and Operation Resolute Support, acquiring 163 combat hours.

=== Decorations ===
Curran's decorations as of 2020 were as follows:

Air Medal
Air Force Commendation Medal with one oak leaf cluster

=== Promotion dates ===
Insignia	Rank	Date
	Major	July 2019
	Captain	August 2013
	First Lieutenant	August 2011
	Second Lieutenant	August 2009

== Books ==
- Upside Down Dreams (2023) ISBN 978-1-63797-075-1
- "The Flipside" (2025)

ISBN 978-1-5387-6810-5
