= Kevin Shibilski =

American politician (born 1961)

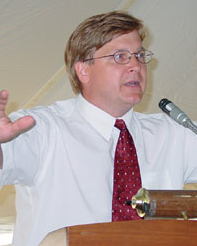

2nd Secretary of the Wisconsin Department of Tourism
- In office January 7, 2003 – May 2, 2003
- Governor: Jim Doyle
- Preceded by: Richard Speros
- Succeeded by: Jim Holperin

Member of the Wisconsin Senate from the 24th district
- In office May 15, 1995 – January 7, 2003
- Preceded by: David Helbach
- Succeeded by: Julie Lassa

Personal details
- Born: June 28, 1961 (age 65) Stevens Point, Wisconsin, U.S.
- Party: Democratic
- Spouse: Sue
- Education: University of Wisconsin–Stevens Point
- Profession: Businessman

Kevin Shibilski (born June 28, 1961) is an American businessman and former Democratic politician from Wisconsin. He served 8 years in the Wisconsin Senate (1995–2003) and served briefly as secretary of the Wisconsin Department of Tourism (2003) under governor Jim Doyle. He also served as register of deeds for Portage County, Wisconsin, and served on the county board of supervisors. In 2022, he pleaded guilty to a number of federal tax crimes arising from his ownership of a waste-recycling business, and was sentenced to 33 months in prison.

== Early life and education ==
Born in Stevens Point, Wisconsin, Shibilski graduated from Stevens Point Area Senior High School and went on to graduate with a B.A. in English from the University of Wisconsin–Stevens Point. He is or has been a member of the Izaak Walton League, Wisconsin Bowhunters Association, Whitetails Unlimited, Tomorrow River Lions Club, Ducks Unlimited, Portage County Red Cross board of directors, and Portage County United Way.

== Political career ==
Shibilski served in the Portage County Board of Supervisors 1982(?)-1987. He then served as Register of Deeds of Portage County 1987–1995.

=== Wisconsin Senate ===
In February 1995, incumbent state senator David Helbach announced his sudden resignation, triggering a special election. Shibilski—who had just won his fourth term as register of deeds in the November 1994 election—immediately entered the race to succeed him. Shibilski faced no opposition for the Democratic nomination and went on to defeat the Republican candidate, Donna Rozar, in the May 2 special election. He joined the Senate later that month and was re-elected without serious opposition in 1996 and 2000.

In 2002, Shibilski entered the race for Lieutenant Governor of Wisconsin, but lost in the Democratic primary to Barbara Lawton.

=== Doyle administration ===
After the 2002 election, Shibilski was named by incoming governor Jim Doyle as his choice to head the Wisconsin Department of Tourism. One of his first acts as secretary was to declare a "no snow emergency" when the state experienced a particularly poor winter snow season, dramatically impacting the state's economy.

He stepped down just a few months after taking office, in May 2003. Journalists and political observers speculated that he was pressured to resign by governor Doyle because of controversy over political attacks used in the special election over Shibilski's former state senate seat. Doyle was described as upset that Shibilski was connected to a mailing which accused then-Assembly candidate Julie Lassa of "hooking up" with former Senate majority leader Charles Chvala, who was at that time facing criminal charges. Republicans speculated that Doyle fired Shibilski as a scapegoat for his own involvement in the smear campaign. Doyle and Shibilski had both supported Lassa's opponent, Stevens Point attorney Alex Paul, in the Senate primary. Paul's parents were large contributors to Doyle's gubernatorial campaign, and Paul, Doyle, and Shibilski shared a common campaign strategist. The broader theory was that Doyle, Shibileski, and Paul had an understanding prior to the 2002 election that if Doyle won, Shibileski would receive a cabinet appointment, creating an opportunity for Paul to run for state senate. Lassa ultimately won the primary and the Senate seat, despite being outspent four-to-one in that primary.

Shibilski did not immediately take another job, but three months later he was hired as vice president of Wisconsin public finance for Stifel, Nicolaus and Company.

Shibilski was reported to have considered a run for United States House of Representatives in Wisconsin's 7th congressional district in both 2010 and 2012, but did enter either race.

== Later career ==
After several years with Stifel, Shibilski left that position to become an investor and CEO/CFO in an electronics recycling company called 5R Processors Ltd., established in 1990. The company focused on recycling of cathode ray tubes, appliances, and other home electronic equipment.

== Federal indictment ==
In July 2020, Shibilski sued his business partners at 5R Processors, accusing them of falsifying accounting and business records to lure investors, like him. A few months later, in September 2020, a federal grand jury indicted Shibilski for his part in the business, bringing charges of wire fraud, illegal disposal of hazardous electronic waste, and tax fraud for not paying employment taxes for 2014 and 2015. Three of his former business partners were also charged and immediately pled guilty and entered into cooperation agreements. Shibilski pled guilty in 2022; he was sentenced to 33 months in prison and ordered to pay $200,000 in restitution.

== Electoral history ==
=== Wisconsin Senate (1995–2000) ===
Year	Election	Date	Elected				Defeated				Total	Plurality
1995	Special	May 2	Kevin Shibilski	Democratic	15,923	57.00%	Donna Rozar	Rep.	12,011	43.00%	27,934	3,912
1996	General	Nov. 5	Kevin Shibilski (inc)	Democratic	44,933	84.08%	Wayne Wiedeman	Tax	8,508	15.92%	53,441	36,425
2000	General	Nov. 7	Kevin Shibilski (inc)	Democratic	55,760	99.49%	--unopposed--				56,047	55,473

=== Wisconsin Lieutenant Governor (2002) ===
Wisconsin Lieutenant Gubernatorial Election, 2002
Party	Candidate	Votes	%	±%
Democratic Primary, September 10, 2002
Democratic	Barbara Lawton	265,733	54.11%	
Democratic	Kevin Shibilski	224,834	45.78%	
	Scattering	525	0.11%	
Plurality		40,899	8.33%	
Total votes		491,092	100.0%	

Wisconsin Senate
Preceded by David Helbach	Member of the Wisconsin Senate from the 24th district May 15, 1995 – January 6, 2003	Succeeded by Julie Lassa
Government offices
Preceded by Richard Speros	Secretary of the Wisconsin Department of Tourism; January 6, 2003 – May 2, 2003	Succeeded by Jim Holperin
