= Orange County High School =

Location
- 201 Selma Road; Orange, Virginia; United States
- Coordinates: 38°14′43.5″N 78°5′47″W

Information
- Type: Public
- Established: 1952
- School district: Orange County Public Schools
- Principal: Nick Sodano
- Teaching staff: 98.24 (FTE)
- Gender: Coeducational
- Enrollment: 1,519 (2021–22)
- Student to teacher ratio: 15.46
- Colors: Orange and navy
- Athletics: Yes
- Mascot: Fighting Hornets
- Yearbook: The Golden Horseshoe
- Website: https://www.ocss-va.org/
- All data from school website/handbook.
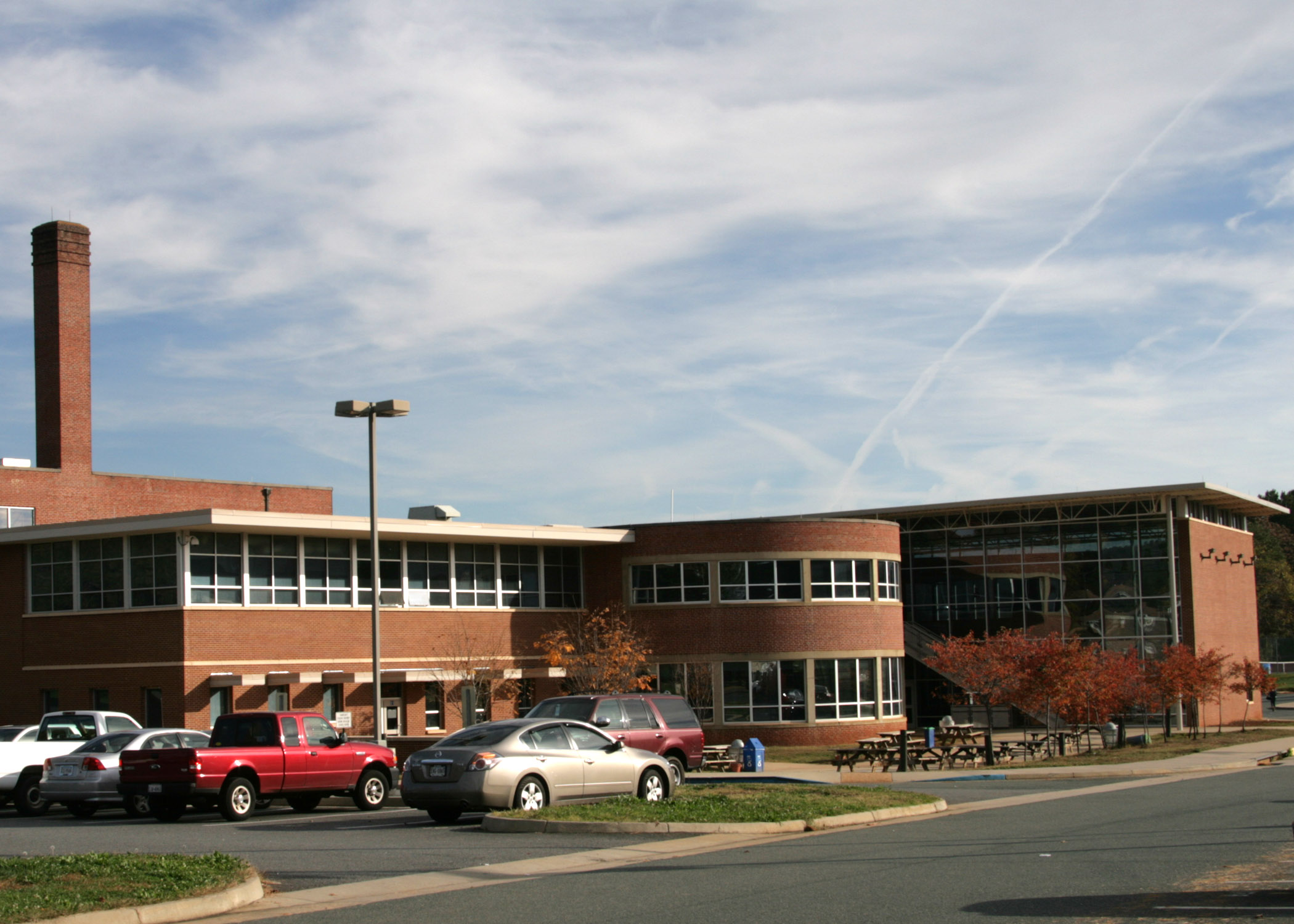
- Orange County High School in Orange, Virginia

Orange County High School is a public high school for students grades 9–12 located in Orange, Virginia.

== History ==
Dedicated on November 9, 1952, at an approximate cost of US$1,150,000, Orange County High School combined students from the Orange & Unionville High Schools, and the Barboursville & Gordonsville Junior High Schools. In 1967, new classrooms, science areas, a cafeteria, and a library were added. In 1997, The Hornet Sports Center Field House was completed to provide students and the community at large access to a year-round physical training center with a weight room, indoor track, basketball, volleyball as well as squash and handball courts. In autumn 2003, the school completed a multimillion-dollar multi-phased renovation, that now provides the faculty and student body population with a state of the art cafeteria, library, and completely renovated classrooms to include an acoustically integrated choral and music instrument practice rooms along with other improvements for student use and safety while adding new larger classrooms contained in a new wing of the school. Starting in 2013, a phase of renovation occurred where the Science lab facilities were expanded and renovated and additional classrooms were placed in the front of the school as semi-permanent structures. In 2017 a full-scale renovation of the outdoor track was undertaken, which was completed in Spring 2021.

== Principals ==
1. Mr. J. Thomas Walker (1952–1955)
2. Mr. William M. Trausneck (1955–1959)
3. Mr. Juel M. Turner (1959–1963)
4. Mr. Robert Jarvis (1963–1969)
5. Mr. Lewis Close (1969–1984)
6. Mr. Paul Cogar (1983–1987)
7. Mr. Paul Douglas (1987–1989)
8. Mr. Gerald Stover (1989–1999)
9. Mrs. Gena Keller (1999 – December 2005)
10. Mr. Todd Wiedow (January 2006 – June 2006)
11. Mr. Eugene Kotulka (2006–2010)
12. Mr. Frank Leech (2010–2011)
13. Mr. Doug Duncan (2011–2015)
14. Mr. Kelly Guempel (2015–2019)
15. Mr. Wendell Green (2019–2022)
16. Mr. Frank Palmieri (2022–2023)
17. Mr. Wayne Price (2023–2025)
18. Mr. Nick Sodano (2025–Present)

== Sports ==
Orange County High School is in the AAA (moved up for 2011–2012 school year) Commonwealth District of the VHSL, and offers a variety of sports, including swimming, basketball, indoor track, outdoor track, gymnastics, football, quizbowl, bear wrestling, golf, softball, tennis, cross country, field hockey, volleyball, lacrosse, and wrestling.

The school has won three VHSL championships in track, one in girls' track, and two in boys' track. The school has also won two state championships in softball.

== Controversy ==
From NBC29.com: Orange County High School held an event in celebration of black history on Thursday, March 12, 2015. The program included historical speeches and songs, but also included students reciting things like, "I was falsely harassed for selling cigarettes and was put into a chokehold eventually leading to my death. I can't breathe. My name is Eric Garner."

Students with the event wore T-shirts that read "Black Lives Matter", and "I Can't Breathe", referencing several high-profile police incidents from across the country. Some parents were so upset that they kept their children home from school Monday. Angry parents say the production was political and inappropriate for the elementary-age students who took part. (A ninth grade student is typically at least fourteen years old). "The real reason everyone is upset is that they've tried to tell children not to trust our police officers here in the community, not only here but across the country," said Art Magner On social media, people mentioned threats of violence and protesting at the schools. Additional law enforcement officers patrolled county schools on Monday to make sure everything went smoothly.

Press release from Orange County Public Schools:

The annual Black History program was presented at Orange County High School on Thursday, March 12, 2015. In its fifth year, it is a program designed by high school students to present information about Black History, up to and including current-day events. This year's program consisted of a wide range of performances, including recitals, a play, songs, dance, and poetry readings. Current day issues involving the deaths of young blacks were highlighted.

Following the program, School Board members received concerns regarding the content and delivery of the program and are working to respond to parents and members of the Orange County community. Because of a posting on a social website, individuals have incorrectly assumed that the program was designed by and presented by students at Lightfoot Elementary – it was not. Some in social media have portrayed the program as designed to promote a political agenda.

We as members of the School Board regret that the nature of the program was offensive to some, but truly believe that there was no intent to offend or disparage anyone.

We acknowledge the full support of Dr. Brenda Tanner, Superintendent of Orange County Public Schools. The School Board takes responsibility for the Black History Program.

== Notable former students ==
- Chris Haney, Major League baseball pitcher
- Larry Haney, Major League baseball player, Class of 1961
- Donna Rozar, Wisconsin state legislator, Class of 1968
