= Elias L. Urquhart =

American businessman and politician (1846–1934)

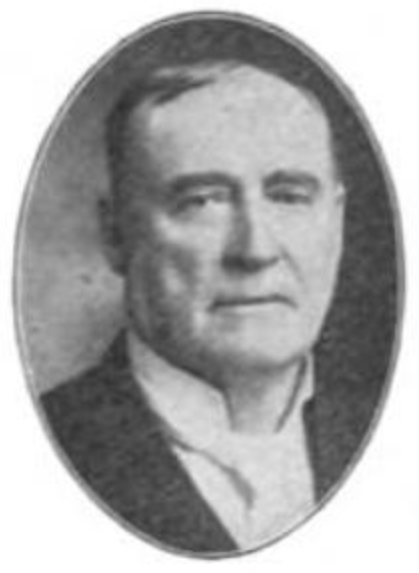

Member of the Wisconsin State Assembly
- In office 1908–1916
- Constituency: Price and Taylor Counties

Personal details
- Born: January 15, 1846 Glengarry County, Upper Canada
- Died: April 12, 1934 (aged 88) Medford, Wisconsin
- Party: Republican
- Occupation: Businessman, politician

Elias L. Urquhart (January 15, 1846 – April 12, 1934) was an American businessman and politician.

== Early life ==
Urquhart was born in Glengarry County, Upper Canada. He lived on a farm. He emigrated to New York State, then Michigan in 1865 and finally Wisconsin in 1870.

== Career ==
He was in the lumber and timber business doing surveying and estimating. Then, he was in the real estate, insurable, and abstract businesses in Medford, Wisconsin. He was also the postmaster in Medford.

== Political career ==
Urquhart served on the school board and on the Taylor County Board of Supervisors and was chairman of the county board. He was sheriff of Taylor County, Wisconsin and was a Republican. From 1909 to 1915, Urquhart served in the Wisconsin State Assembly.

== Personal life ==
Urquhart lived in Medford, Wisconsin, where he died in 1934, aged 88.
