= 1995 Wisconsin elections =

- April 4, 1995

The 1995 Wisconsin Spring Election was held in the U.S. state of Wisconsin on April 4, 1995.

== State offices ==
=== Legislative ===
==== 24th State Senate District special election ====
A special election was held on May 2, 1995, to fill the 24th State Senate seat vacated by the resignation of David Helbach. Register of Deeds of Portage County Kevin Shibilski defeated Republican candidate Donna Rozar in the special election. The election resulted in Democrats retaining the seat.

Wisconsin Senate, 24th District Special Election, 1995
Party	Candidate	Votes	%	±%
Democratic	Kevin Shibilski	15,923	57.00%	
Republican	Donna M. Rozar	12,011	43.00%	
Plurality		3,912	14.00%	
Total votes		27,934	100.0%	-44.87%
Democratic hold				

==== 14th State Senate District special election ====
A special election was held on September 12, 1995, to fill the 14th State Senate seat vacated by the resignation of Joseph Leean. former State Representative Robert Welch defeated Democratic candidate Martin D. Farrell in the special election. The election resulted in Republicans retaining the seat.

Wisconsin Senate, 14th District Special Election, 1995
Party	Candidate	Votes	%	±%
Republican	Robert Welch	9,428	57.06%	
Democratic	Martin F. Farrell	5,928	35.88%	
Constitution	John Stumpf	1,167	7.06%	
Plurality		3,500	10.44%	
Total votes		33,511	100.0%	
Republican hold				

==== 7th State Senate District special election ====
A special election was held on December 12, 1995, to fill the 7th State Senate seat vacated by the death of John Plewa. State Representative Richard Grobschmidt defeated Republican candidate Tom Thompson in the special election. The election resulted in Democrats retaining the seat.

Wisconsin Senate, 14th District Special Election, 1995
Party	Candidate	Votes	%	±%
Democratic	Richard Grobschmidt	6,163	80.54%	
Republican	Tom Thompson	1,253	16.37%	
Libertarian	James Wahl	236	3.08%	
Plurality		4,910	64.17%	
Total votes		7,652	100.0%	
Democratic hold				

=== Ballot measures ===
There were three amendments to the Constitution of Wisconsin on the ballot for the Spring general election. None of the amendments were ratified by voters.

==== Wisconsin Sports Lottery Referendum ====
Wisconsin Sports Lottery
- April 4, 1995
- Wisconsin sports lottery. Shall section 24(6)(a) of article IV of the constitution be amended to permit the state to operate lottery games that have their proceeds dedicated to athletic facilities?

Results
Choice	Votes	%
Yes	348,818	36.06%
No	618,377	63.94%
Total votes	967,195	100.00%
No
80-90%
70-80%
60-70%
50-60%
Yes
50-60%

For Question 1, a "yes" vote would have allowed the state to operate lottery games that had their proceeds go towards dedicated athletic facilities.

==== Gender Neutral Referendum ====
References to Masculine Gender Removed
- April 4, 1995
- References to masculine gender removed. Shall articles I, IV, V, VI, VII, XI, and XIII of the constitution be amended to remove unnecessary masculine gender pronouns?

Results
Choice	Votes	%
Yes	412,032	45.24%
No	498,801	54.76%
Total votes	910,833	100.00%
No
70-80%
60-70%
50-60%
Yes
50-60%

For Question 2, a "yes" vote would have removed unnecessary masculine pronouns used across the Wisconsin constitution.

==== Judges' Office Referendum ====
Eligibility of Judges for Nonjudicial Office
- April 4, 1995
- Eligibility of Judges for Nonjudicial Office. Shall section 10(1) of article VII of the constitution be amended to permit a judge to assume a nonjudicial office of public trust after vacating the judicial office during that term of office?

Results
Choice	Votes	%
Yes	390,744	43.71%
No	503,239	56.29%
Total votes	893,983	100.00%
No
70-80%
60-70%
50-60%
Yes
50-60%

For Question 3, a "yes" vote would have allowed justices to assume other political offices "of public trust" after vacating their judicial office earlier than the expiration of their term.

== Local elections ==
=== Brown County ===
==== Green Bay mayor ====
- Incumbent mayor Sam Halloin declined to seek re-election and was succeeded by the city's personnel director, Paul Jadin, who was elected with 55% of the vote.
