= Richard Shoemaker =

American politician

Member of the Wisconsin Senate from the 10th district
- In office January 2, 1989 – October 2, 1989
- Preceded by: James Harsdorf
- Succeeded by: William Berndt

Member of the Wisconsin State Assembly
- In office January 7, 1985 – January 2, 1989
- Preceded by: Raymond J. Moyer
- Succeeded by: Alvin Baldus
- Constituency: 29th district
- In office January 3, 1983 – January 7, 1985
- Preceded by: Ervin Conradt
- Succeeded by: Robert T. Welch
- Constituency: 41st district
- In office January 1, 1979 – January 3, 1983
- Preceded by: La Verne Ausman
- Succeeded by: Lolita Schneiders
- Constituency: 69th district

Personal details
- Born: Richard Allan Shoemaker; June 11, 1951 Beloit, Wisconsin, U.S.
- Died: March 26, 2026 (aged 74)
- Party: Democratic
- Spouses: Linda Rhodes (m. 1969, divorced); Joanne Marshall (m. 2021)
- Children: 2
- Education: University of Wisconsin–Stout (B.S.)

Richard Allan Shoemaker (June 11, 1951 - March 26, 2026) was an American retailer and former Democratic politician from Menomonie, Wisconsin. He served for 9 months in the Wisconsin State Senate, representing the 10th district before resigning from office after being convicted of several misdemeanors. He previously served five terms in the Wisconsin state legislature representing all of Dunn County and parts of Eau Claire County, and later eastern Dunn County and northern St. Croix County.

== Biography ==
Shoemaker was born on June 11, 1951, in Beloit, Wisconsin. He graduated from Menomonie High School in Menomonie, Wisconsin and the University of Wisconsin-Stout. Shoemaker was married with two children. He died on March 26, 2026.

== Career ==
Shoemaker was Supervisor of Dunn County, Wisconsin from 1976 to 1977 before serving as a member of the Assembly from 1978 to 1986. He was elected to the Senate in 1988. Shoemaker was a Democrat.

Shoemaker was convicted in 1989 of receiving illegal money from a lobbyist, failing to disclose a loan on financial disclosure statements, using his office for personal gain, defrauding his campaign committee and filing false campaign reports. He was charged campaign fund fraud and failure to disclose personal gains. He was found guilty and sentenced to 60 days in jail. (1988)
