= WIGM =

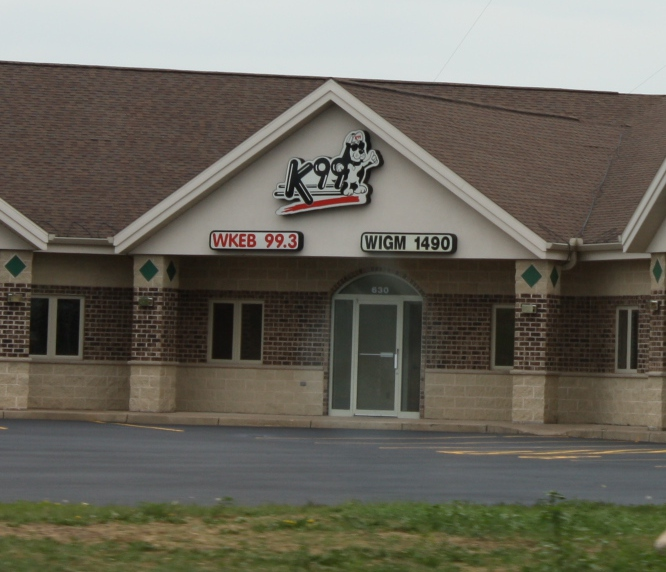
- Medford, Wisconsin; United States
- Frequency: 1490 kHz
- Branding: Kickin' Country

Programming
- Format: Country

Ownership
- Owner: WIGM, Incorporated
- Sister stations: WKEB

History
- First air date: 1941
- Call sign meaning: Irma and George Meyer

Technical information
- Licensing authority: FCC
- Facility ID: 70517
- Class: C
- Power: 1,000 watts (day); 1,000 watts (night)
- Transmitter coordinates: 45°9′51.00″N 90°20′28.00″W
- Translator: 107.1 W296DL (Medford)

Links
- Public license information: Public file; LMS
- Webcast: Listen live
- Website: Listen live

WIGM (1490 AM) is a radio station licensed to Medford, Wisconsin, United States, that broadcasts a sports format. The station is currently owned by WIGM, Incorporated, and features programming from CBS Sports Radio.

In February 2019 WIGM changed their format from sports to country, branded as "Kickin' Country" (simulcast on FM translator W296DL Medford).

== Previous logo ==
(WIGM's logo under previous ESPN Radio affiliation)
