= The Lumber Baron =

- Theatrical release poster
- Directed by: Barry Andersson
- Written by: Karen R. Hurd
- Produced by: Karen R. Hurd
- Starring: Joseph Bezenek; Christina Baldwin; Anna Stranz
- Cinematography: Travis Higgins
- Edited by: Joshua Steven
- Music by: Andrew Joslyn
- Distributed by: Indican Pictures
- Release date: June 4, 2019
- Running time: 120 minutes
- Country: United States
- Language: English
- Budget: $245,000

The Lumber Baron is a 2019 American historical drama film written and produced by Wisconsin State Representative Karen R. Hurd and directed by Barry Andersson. Set in the early twentieth century during Wisconsin's lumber boom, the film follows a young heir who returns home after his father's death and becomes entangled in family conflict, labor tensions, and moral compromise. The film was shot on location in Eau Claire, Wisconsin.

== Plot ==
At the turn of the twentieth century, Wisconsin's lumber industry dominates both the state economy and the social order. When prominent lumber magnate Daniel Rimsdale Sr. dies suddenly, his eldest son, Daniel Rimsdale Jr., abandons his medical studies and returns home to rescue the family's failing business and preserve its standing in the community.

Daniel quickly discovers that neither he nor his family truly understands the day-to-day realities of the lumber trade. Suspecting corruption and sabotage from a rival operator, he disguises himself as a common laborer and goes undercover in his own company's logging camps. Immersed in the physical toll of the work, Daniel witnesses widespread exploitation and growing resentment among the laborers who sustain the industry.

As Daniel uncovers financial schemes and ethical compromises left behind by his father's generation, tensions escalate within both the family and the wider lumber community. A suspicious death involving a mysterious “headache powder” brings these conflicts to a head, forcing Daniel to confront not only the dangers surrounding the business but the moral cost of maintaining his family's power in a rapidly changing world.

== Cast ==
- Joseph Bezenek as Daniel Rimsdale Jr.
- Christina Baldwin as Elizabeth Rimsdale
- Anna Stranz as Adeline Rimsdale
- Scout Taylor-Compton as Mary Catherine Rimsdale
- Henry Sollberger as Colin Rimsdale
- Charles Hubbell as Silas Lynch

== Production ==
The Lumber Baron was produced by Scene & Hurd Productions and filmed on location in Eau Claire, Wisconsin. The production utilized a number of historic and regional sites, including the Cook-Rutledge Mansion, the Paul Bunyan Logging Camp Museum, Hoffman Hills, and other locations in and around Eau Claire.

Karen R. Hurd, who wrote the screenplay and served as a producer, later became a member of the Wisconsin State Assembly.

== Release ==
The film was released in the United States on June 4, 2019. It received a limited theatrical release where it grossed $87,881, followed by digital distribution.

== Reception ==
In a review for the Los Angeles Times, critic Gary Goldstein described The Lumber Baron as an ambitious but uneven historical drama, noting that its aspirations toward period authenticity were constrained by limited resources.

== See also ==
- Film industry in Wisconsin
