= Bob Kulp =

American Republican politician

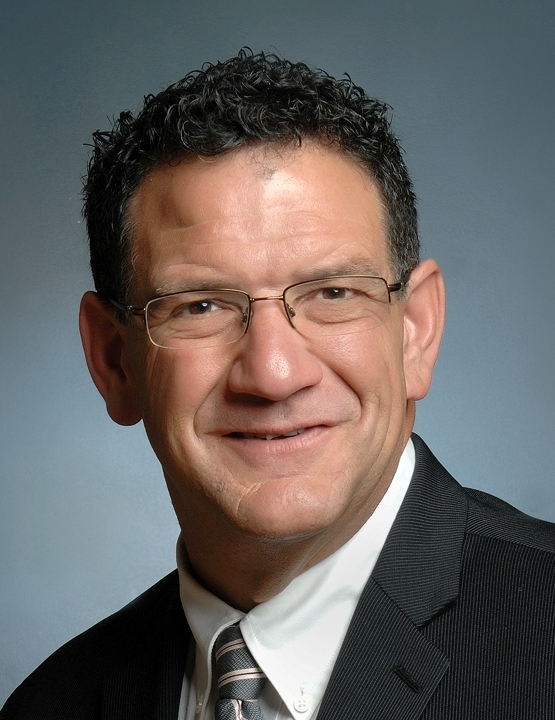

Member of the Wisconsin State Assembly from the 69th district
- In office December 4, 2013 – January 4, 2021
- Preceded by: Scott Suder
- Succeeded by: Donna Rozar

Personal details
- Born: March 21, 1966 (age 60) Elkhart, Indiana
- Party: Republican
- Spouse: Laura
- Children: 7
- Education: Thomas Edison State University
- Profession: Politician
- Website: Official twitter

Bob Kulp (March 21, 1966) is an American businessman and politician. A Republican, he was a member of the Wisconsin State Assembly from 2013 to 2021.

== Early life and career ==
Kulp was born in Elkhart, Indiana, but moved with his family to Marathon County, Wisconsin, where he was raised on a dairy farm. In 1985, Kulp founded Kulp's of Stratford, a roofing, insulation, and sheet metal installation contractor. He subsequently created Marathon Metals in 2001 and Kulp Energy Solutions in 2011, which function as suppliers for his primary business. He also created Kulp Real Properties in 2001, through which he manages a real estate portfolio. In 2014, he resumed his education through the online Thomas Edison State University, where he received his bachelor's degree in public administration in 2017.

== Political career ==
In 2013, incumbent state representative Scott Suder announced he would resign from the Wisconsin State Assembly before the end of the year to accept a new job. A special election was called to fill the pending vacancy, and Kulp was one of four Republicans who filed to run in the primary. Kulp ultimately prevailed in the Republican primary with 43% of the vote, and went on to defeat Democrat Kenneth Slezak in the November 19 special election. Kulp was sworn in as representative of the 69th district on December 4, 2013.

In 2018, the Wisconsin Ethics Commission issued a warning to Kulp for violated state ethics laws by promoting his company utilizing state resources.

In January 2020, Kulp announced that he would not seek a fifth term in the Wisconsin State Assembly. He left office in January 2021.

== Electoral history ==
=== Wisconsin Assembly (2013) ===
Wisconsin Assembly, 69th District Special Election, 2013
Party	Candidate	Votes	%	±%
Republican Primary, October 22, 2013
Republican	Bob Kulp	2,260	46.94%	
Republican	Alanna Feddick	1,273	24.61%	
Republican	Tommy Dahlen	1,014	19.61%	
Republican	Scott Kenneth Noble	624	12.06%	
	Scattering	1	0.02%	
Plurality		987	19.08%	
Total votes		5,172	100.0%	
Special Election, November 19, 2013
Republican	Bob Kulp	4,700	67.28%	
Democratic	Kenneth A. Slezak	1,679	24.03%	
Independent	Tim Swiggum	607	8.69%	
	Scattering	0	0.0%	
Plurality		3,021	43.24%	+20.82%
Total votes		6,986	100.0%	-72.93%
Republican hold				

Wisconsin State Assembly
Preceded by Scott Suder	Member of the Wisconsin State Assembly from the 69th district December 4, 2013 – January 4, 2021	Succeeded by Donna Rozar
