= Medford, Wisconsin =

- City
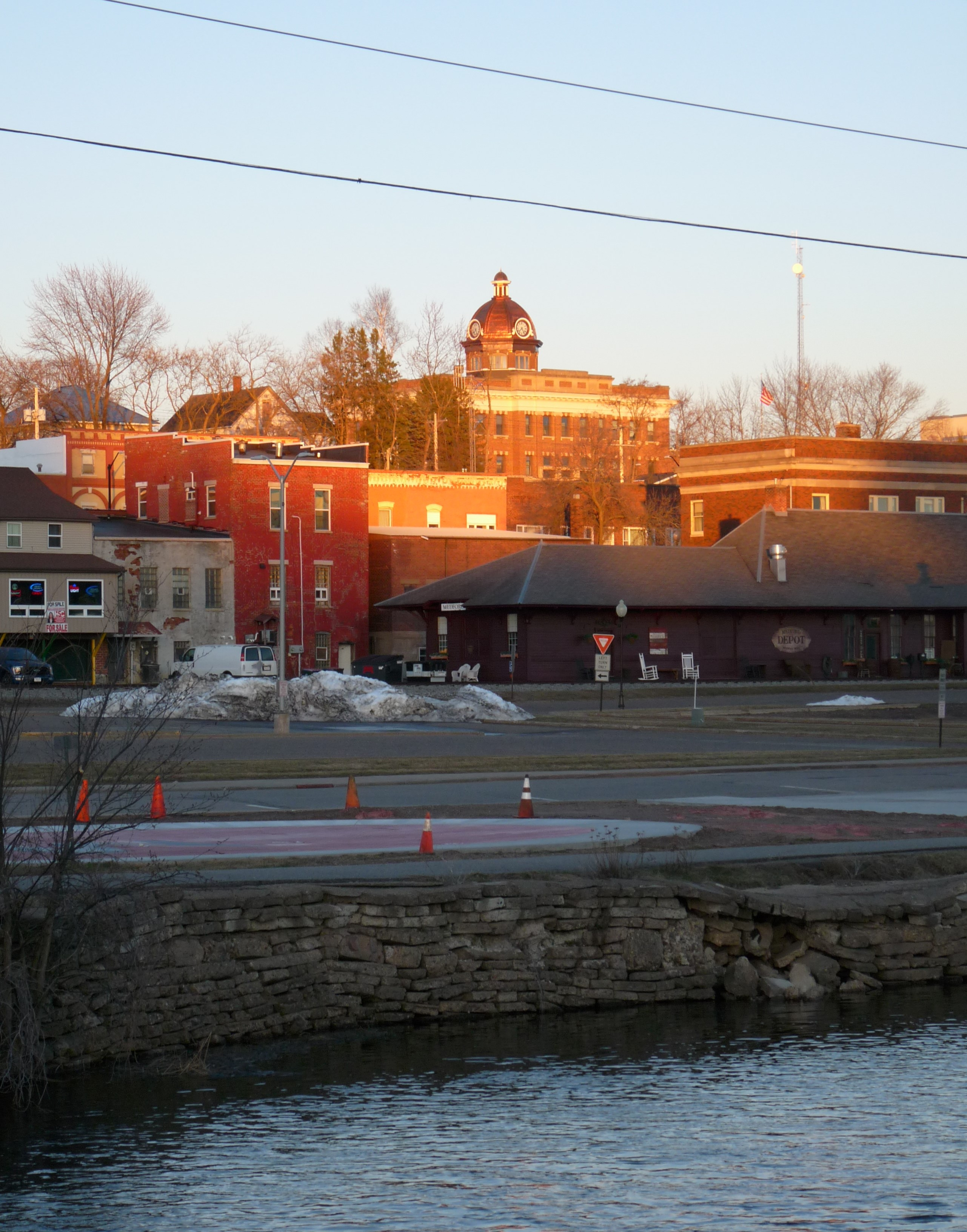
- Downtown Medford viewed from across the Black River

- Location of Medford in Taylor County, Wisconsin.

- Location within Wisconsin Location within the United States
- Coordinates: 45°8′17″N 90°20′43″W
- Country: United States
- State: Wisconsin
- County: Taylor

Area
  - Total: 4.52 sq mi (11.71 km^{2})
  - Land: 4.49 sq mi (11.64 km^{2})
  - Water: 0.027 sq mi (0.07 km^{2})

Population (2020)
  - Total: 4,349
  - Density: 968/sq mi (373.7/km^{2})
- Time zone: UTC-6 (Central (CST))
  - Summer (DST): UTC-5 (CDT)
- ZIP codes: 54451
- Area code: 715
- FIPS code: 55-50425
- Website: medfordwi.gov

Medford is a city and county seat of Taylor County, Wisconsin, United States. The population was 4,349 at the 2020 census. The city is located mostly within the boundaries of the Town of Medford.

== History ==
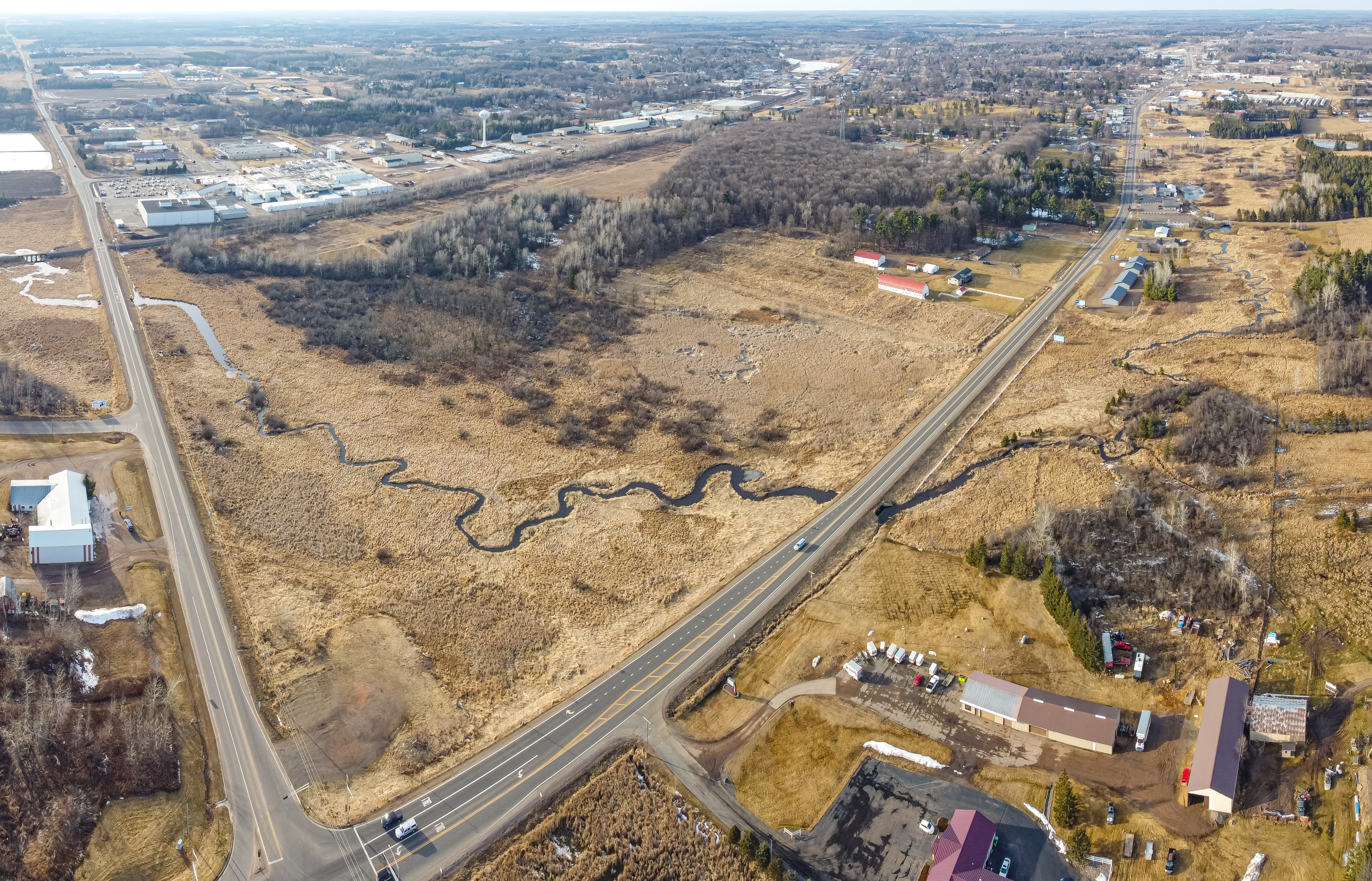

Medford is located on historic Ojibwe forest land acquired by the United States in the 1837 Treaty of St. Peters. In 1864, the federal government authorized a grant of some 837,000 acres (1,308 sq mi; 3,390 km^{2}) of this land to subsidize railway construction through the area. The Wisconsin Central Railroad Company, controlled by Boston financier Gardner Colby, obtained the land grant and constructed the railroad in the 1870s. The railroad company and a local lumber milling company laid out the city of Medford in 1875 and sold lots for twenty-five dollars each. The railroad named the new settlement after Medford, Massachusetts, the hometown of a railroad official. Medford shipped over 1.5 million board feet of lumber by rail within a year of its establishment, and the area was soon clear cut for farming.

The Wisconsin Legislature organized Taylor County in 1875 and named Medford the county seat, leading to a dispute between the Wisconsin Central Railroad and the mill company over the location of the courthouse. The Taylor County Courthouse was ultimately constructed on land donated by the railroad company.

In the 1960s and 1970s, Medford hosted an annual mink festival, celebrating the town's claim to be the "Mink capital of the world." Fur farms in the area make Taylor County a top mink producer in North America. During the COVID-19 pandemic, in 2020, thousands of mink died of the virus after having contracted it from human workers.

== Geography ==
According to the United States Census Bureau, the city has a total area of 4.52 square miles (11.71 km^{2}), of which 4.49 square miles (11.63 km^{2}) is land and 0.03 square miles (0.08 km^{2}) is water.

=== Climate ===
Climate data for Medford, Wisconsin, 1991–2020 normals, extremes 1893–present
Month	Jan	Feb	Mar	Apr	May	Jun	Jul	Aug	Sep	Oct	Nov	Dec	Year
Record high °F (°C)	52 (11)	60 (16)	78 (26)	89 (32)	101 (38)	103 (39)	104 (40)	100 (38)	99 (37)	89 (32)	73 (23)	60 (16)	104 (40)
Mean maximum °F (°C)	37.8 (3.2)	44.1 (6.7)	59.1 (15.1)	74.7 (23.7)	82.9 (28.3)	87.3 (30.7)	88.5 (31.4)	87.9 (31.1)	83.7 (28.7)	74.6 (23.7)	57.4 (14.1)	42.7 (5.9)	90.7 (32.6)
Mean daily maximum °F (°C)	20.6 (−6.3)	25.8 (−3.4)	38.1 (3.4)	52.3 (11.3)	65.8 (18.8)	74.8 (23.8)	78.8 (26.0)	77.0 (25.0)	69.2 (20.7)	54.8 (12.7)	38.7 (3.7)	25.9 (−3.4)	51.8 (11.0)
Daily mean °F (°C)	11.4 (−11.4)	15.7 (−9.1)	28.0 (−2.2)	41.5 (5.3)	54.5 (12.5)	64.0 (17.8)	68.0 (20.0)	66.2 (19.0)	58.3 (14.6)	44.7 (7.1)	30.9 (−0.6)	18.1 (−7.7)	41.8 (5.4)
Mean daily minimum °F (°C)	2.3 (−16.5)	5.6 (−14.7)	17.9 (−7.8)	30.6 (−0.8)	43.3 (6.3)	53.3 (11.8)	57.2 (14.0)	55.3 (12.9)	47.3 (8.5)	34.5 (1.4)	23.0 (−5.0)	10.3 (−12.1)	31.7 (−0.2)
Mean minimum °F (°C)	−19.1 (−28.4)	−15.7 (−26.5)	−5.3 (−20.7)	16.0 (−8.9)	29.0 (−1.7)	39.1 (3.9)	46.4 (8.0)	43.6 (6.4)	31.7 (−0.2)	20.9 (−6.2)	5.0 (−15.0)	−11.6 (−24.2)	−23.0 (−30.6)
Record low °F (°C)	−40 (−40)	−45 (−43)	−40 (−40)	−4 (−20)	16 (−9)	22 (−6)	34 (1)	30 (−1)	11 (−12)	2 (−17)	−19 (−28)	−31 (−35)	−45 (−43)
Average precipitation inches (mm)	1.09 (28)	1.10 (28)	1.67 (42)	2.98 (76)	3.68 (93)	4.84 (123)	4.02 (102)	4.30 (109)	3.90 (99)	3.25 (83)	1.94 (49)	1.43 (36)	34.20 (869)
Average snowfall inches (cm)	12.8 (33)	13.9 (35)	6.0 (15)	4.0 (10)	0.1 (0.25)	0.0 (0.0)	0.0 (0.0)	0.0 (0.0)	0.0 (0.0)	0.5 (1.3)	4.5 (11)	15.2 (39)	57.0 (145)
Average precipitation days (≥ 0.01 in)	9.7	7.2	8.1	11.0	12.4	12.4	11.0	10.6	11.3	11.4	8.9	10.3	124.3
Average snowy days (≥ 0.1 in)	6.8	5.1	2.8	1.6	0.1	0.0	0.0	0.0	0.0	0.3	2.2	6.8	25.7
Source 1: NOAA
Source 2: National Weather Service

== Demographics ==
Historical population
Census	Pop.	Note	%±
1880	504		—
1890	1,193		136.7%
1900	1,758		47.4%
1910	1,846		5.0%
1920	1,881		1.9%
1930	1,918		2.0%
1940	2,361		23.1%
1950	2,799		18.6%
1960	3,260		16.5%
1970	3,454		6.0%
1980	4,035		16.8%
1990	4,283		6.1%
2000	4,350		1.6%
2010	4,326		−0.6%
2020	4,349		0.5%
U.S. Decennial Census

=== 2020 census ===
As of the census of 2020, the population was 4,349. The population density was 968.0 inhabitants per square mile (373.7/km^{2}). There were 2,163 housing units at an average density of 481.4 per square mile (185.9/km^{2}). The racial makeup of the city was 92.3% White, 0.7% Asian, 0.7% Black or African American, 0.3% Native American, 2.1% from other races, and 4.0% from two or more races. Ethnically, the population was 4.6% Hispanic or Latino of any race.

=== 2010 census ===
As of the census of 2010, there were 4,326 people, 1,982 households, and 1,094 families residing in the city. The population density was 959.2 inhabitants per square mile (370.3/km^{2}). There were 2,127 housing units at an average density of 471.6 per square mile (182.1/km^{2}). The racial makeup of the city was 97.0% White, 0.5% African American, 0.4% Native American, 0.6% Asian, 0.2% from other races, and 1.4% from two or more races. Hispanic or Latino of any race were 1.2% of the population.

There were 1,982 households, of which 26.0% had children under the age of 18 living with them, 40.6% were married couples living together, 10.0% had a female householder with no husband present, 4.5% had a male householder with no wife present, and 44.8% were non-families. 39.4% of all households were made up of individuals, and 19.6% had someone living alone who was 65 years of age or older. The average household size was 2.10 and the average family size was 2.79.

The median age in the city was 43 years. 22.2% of residents were under the age of 18; 7.7% were between the ages of 18 and 24; 22.6% were from 25 to 44; 25.7% were from 45 to 64; and 21.7% were 65 years of age or older. The gender makeup of the city was 47.5% male and 52.5% female.

=== 2000 census ===
As of the census of 2000, there were 4,350 people. The population density was 1,243.9 people per square mile (479.9/km^{2}). There were 2,034 housing units at an average density of 581.6 per square mile (224.4/km^{2}). The racial makeup of the city was 98.69% White, 0.11% Black or African American, 0.18% Native American, 0.18% Asian, 0.02% from other races, and 0.80% from two or more races. 0.57% of the population were Hispanic or Latino of any race.

There were 1,947 households, out of which 27.2% had children under the age of 18 living with them, 45.9% were married couples living together, 9.0% had a female householder with no husband present, and 41.9% were non-families. 36.2% of all households were made up of individuals, and 16.8% had someone living alone who was 65 years of age or older. The average household size was 2.17 and the average family size was 2.86.

In the city, the population was spread out, with 23.2% under the age of 18, 8.6% from 18 to 24, 27.1% from 25 to 44, 19.2% from 45 to 64, and 21.9% who were 65 years of age or older. The median age was 39 years. For every 100 females, there were 91.0 males. For every 100 females age 18 and over, there were 86.6 males.

The median income for a household in the city was $35,278, and the median income for a family was $47,045. Males had a median income of $31,840 versus $23,955 for females. The per capita income for the city was $19,962. About 4.3% of families and 9.1% of the population were below the poverty line, including 12.9% of those under age 18 and 11.9% of those age 65 or over.

== Government ==
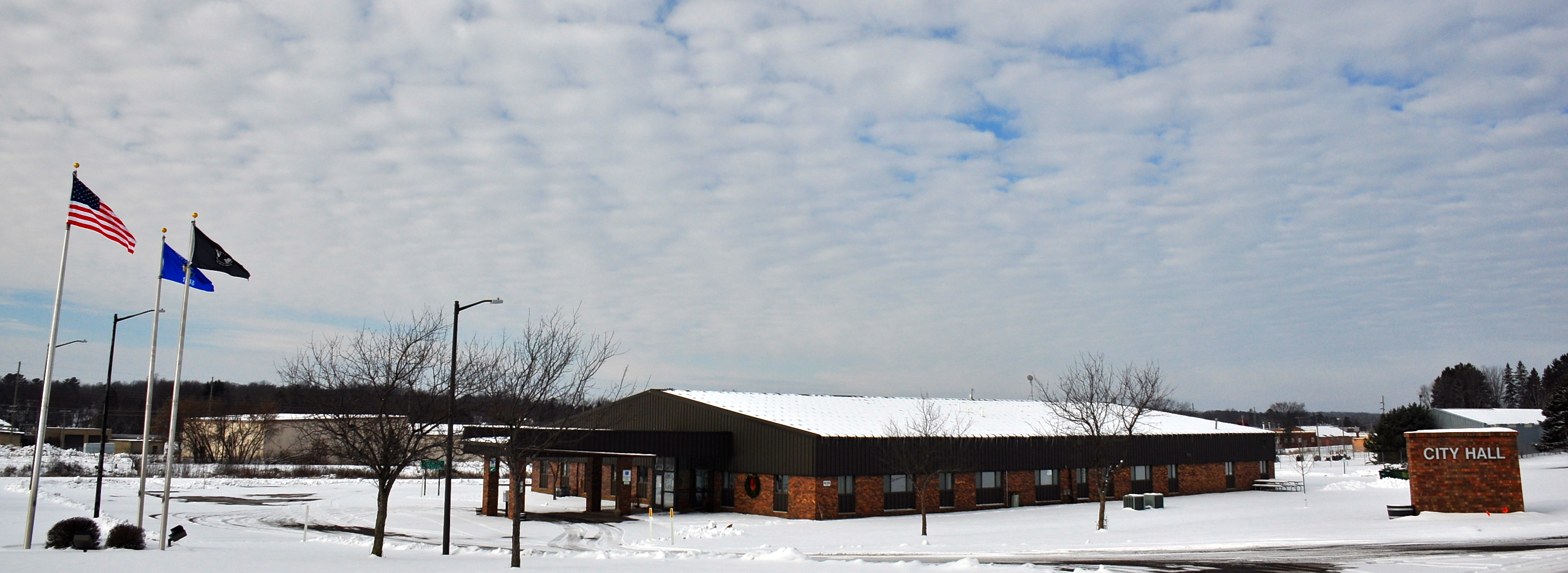
City hall in Medford, Wisconsin in November 2013

Medford has a mayor-council form of government. The mayor is elected for a two-year term. Each of the four city districts is represented by an alderperson, with two elected to two-year terms in alternating years.

== Recreation ==
=== Medford City Park ===
Medford City Park, the city's principal community park, was established in 1890 and consists of 100 acres (0.40 km^{2}). An extensive redevelopment program for the park was initiated in 1979. Equipment and facilities include an outdoor swimming pool, with dressing area and wading pool, playground equipment, four park shelters, two restroom facilities, one tennis court, four volleyball courts, one basketball court, two softball fields, a concession stand, nine recreation vehicle camping facilities, a skatepark, the "River Walk" which parallels the Black River for the majority of its way through the city, and picnic and barbecue areas along the walkway. The 19-acre (7.7 ha) Medford millpond has been periodically dredged of sedimentation in an effort to improve fish habitat in the pond.

=== Grahl Park ===
Grahl Park consists of 7 acres (0.028 km^{2}) and is designed as an integral part of a residential subdivision and has pedestrian access points to surrounding neighborhoods from the west, north, and east. It has a Little League baseball field, basketball court, restroom facilities, park shelter, and playground equipment.

=== Pine Line Trail ===
The southern trailhead of Wisconsin's Pine Line Trail, lies within Medford. The Pine Line Trail is an unpaved, multi-use rail-trail extending just over 26 miles (42 km) to Prentice.

=== Curling Club ===
The Medford Curling Club is located on the south side of the city. The Mixed National Championships were most recently held here in 2009. There are four sheets of ice, a changing room, and a warming area inside.

=== Golf courses ===
The city has two golf courses, the Tee-Hi Golf Course and the Black River Golf Club.

== Transportation ==
=== Major highways ===
WIS 13 travels north to Prentice, Wisconsin and south to Stetsonville, Wisconsin.
WIS 64 travels east to Merrill, Wisconsin and west to Gilman, Wisconsin.

=== Airport ===
- KMDZ – Taylor County

Medford is served by the Taylor County Airport (KMDZ). It is located approximately three miles southeast of Medford. The airport handles approximately 7,000 operations per year, with roughly 93% general aviation and 7% air taxi. The airport has two asphalt runways; a 6,000-foot runway with approved GPS approaches (Runway 9–27) and a 4,435-foot crosswind runway, also with GPS approaches, (Runway 16–34).

== Media ==
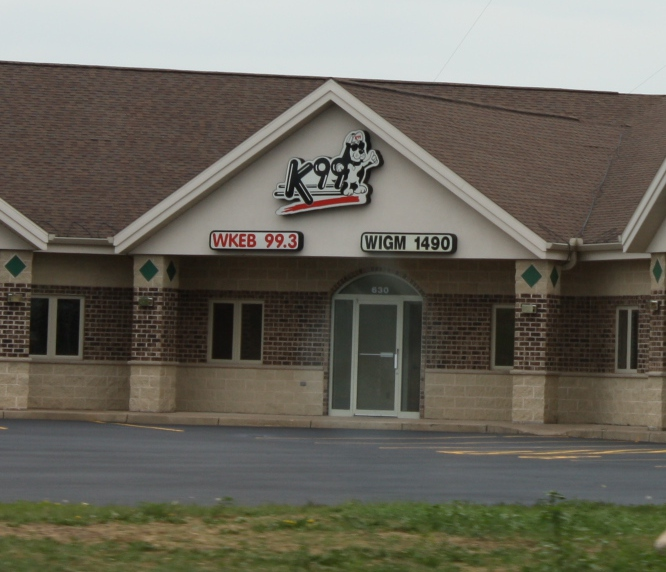
WKEB / WIGM studios

=== AM radio ===
- WIGM AM 1490, (Country music)

=== FM radio ===
- WKEB FM 99.3, (Adult hits)

=== Newspaper ===
- Star News

== Cable ==
- Direct TV
- Dish Network

== Education ==
=== Primary ===
- Medford Area Elementary School, public school serving grades PK-4
- Medford Area Middle School, public school serving grades 5–8
- Holy Rosary Catholic School, Catholic school serving grades PK-6
- Immanuel Lutheran School, Lutheran school serving grades PK-8

=== Secondary ===
- Medford Area Senior High School, public school serving grades 9–12

=== Post-secondary ===
- Northcentral Technical College West Campus

== Health care ==
Aspirus Medford Hospital is a health care organization that operates a hospital, clinics, senior care facilities, and a skilled nursing care and rehabilitation facility in the Medford area. Featuring and extensive renovation done within the last 10 years, Memorial Health Center has been promoted to feature an Aspirus Heart and Vascular Institute.

== Notable people ==
- Michelle Curran, United States Air Force officer and pilot
- Jeane Dixon, psychic, prophet and astrologer
- John Gamper, Wisconsin politician
- Levi Withee Gibson, Wisconsin politician
- Anthony J. Opachen, Wisconsin politician
- John K. Parish, Wisconsin politician and jurist
- Jack Perkins, actor
- Erny Pinckert, football player
- Zachary Rhyner, Air Force Cross recipient
- Steve Russ, Denver Broncos linebacker
- Joe "Pep" Simek, co-founder of Tombstone Pizza and founder of Pep's Pizza
- Scott Suder, Wisconsin politician
- Clinton Textor, Wisconsin politician
- Elias L. Urquhart, Wisconsin politician

== Images ==
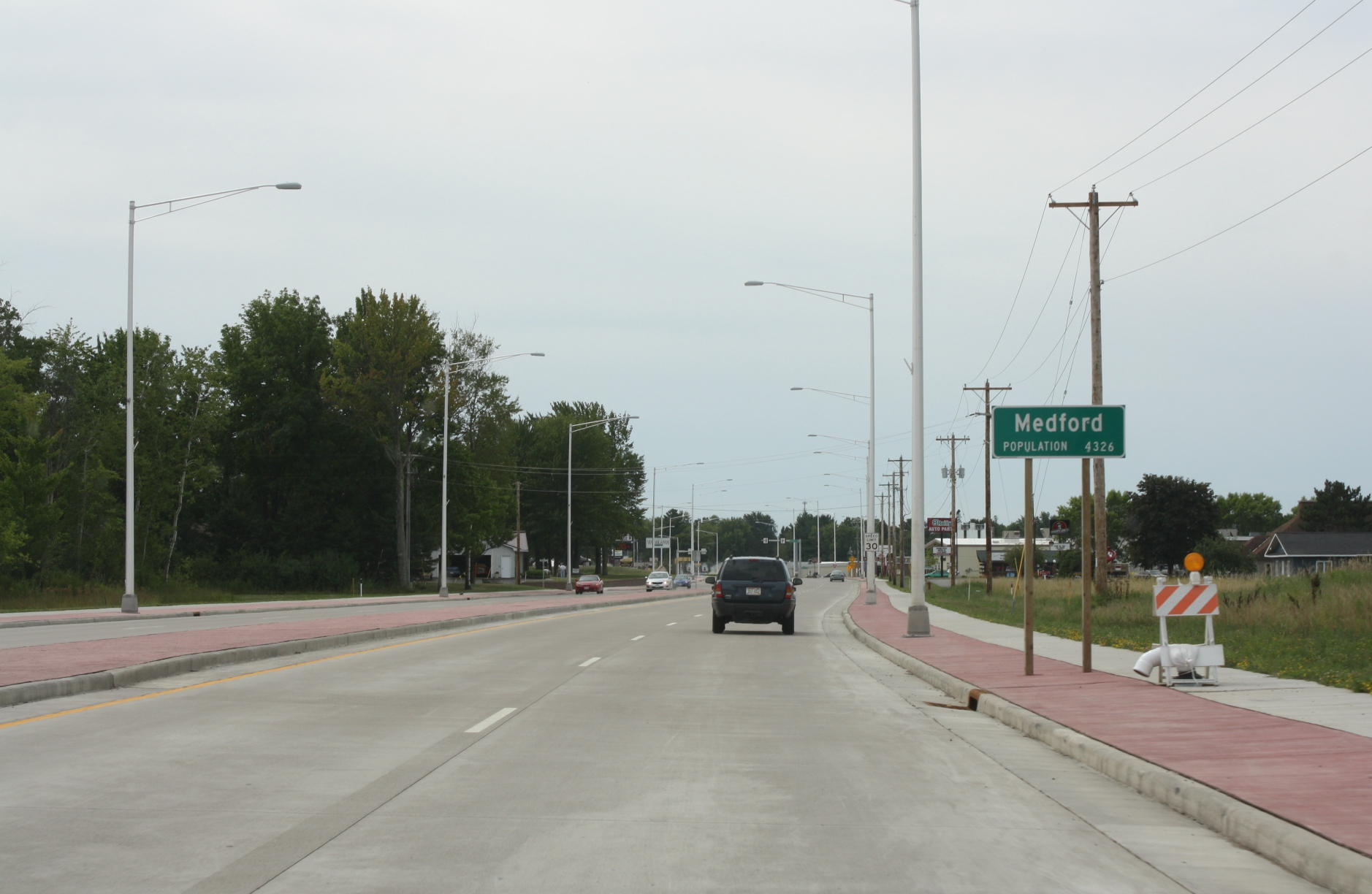
Sign on WIS 13

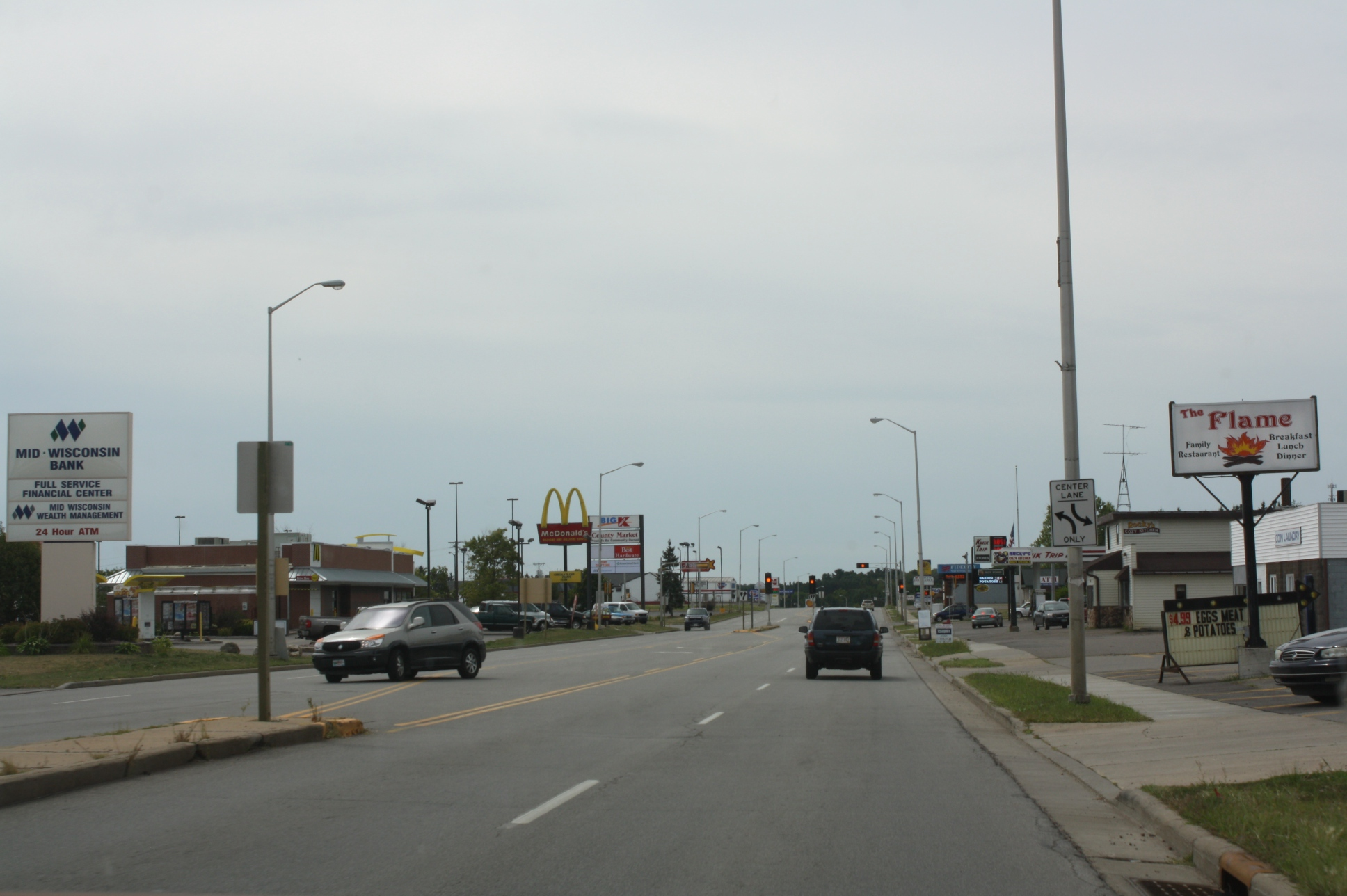
Business District
