= Wisconsin Department of Tourism =

Government agency in Wisconsin, United States

Agency overview
- Formed: December 24, 1995; 30 years ago
- Preceding agency: Division of Tourism (1975–1995)
- Jurisdiction: Wisconsin
- Headquarters: 3319 W Beltline Hwy Madison, Wisconsin; 43°02′6.617″N 89°25′48.358″W
- Employees: 34
- Annual budget: $36,334,300 (2021)
- Agency executive: Anne Sayers, Secretary
- Website: TravelWisconsin.com

The Wisconsin Department of Tourism is a governmental agency of the U.S. state of Wisconsin responsible for marketing and promoting the state as a travel destination. The Department is led by a secretary appointed by the governor of Wisconsin with the advice and consent of the Wisconsin Senate. The current secretary is Anne Sayers, who was appointed by Governor Tony Evers in December 2020.

== History ==
State tourism promotion originated as a project of the Wisconsin Department of Natural Resources to encourage travel to state parks and commercial recreational properties. This project was transferred from the DNR to the Wisconsin Department of Business Development in 1975, and formally created as the Division of Tourism in that department under Act 39 of 1975. The Wisconsin Department of Business Development was succeeded by the Wisconsin Department of Development in 1979, after merging with the Department of Local Affairs and Development. The Division of Tourism was separated from Development and promoted to become the current Department of Tourism in 1995, with 1995 Wisconsin Act 27.

In its present configuration, the Department of Tourism has several attached specialty boards and councils, including the Council on Tourism, the Wisconsin Arts Board, the Kickapoo Reserve Management Board, and the Wisconsin State Fair Park Board.

== Overview ==
A primary tool that the department uses to fulfill its mission and duties is maintaining its official web site, TravelWisconsin.com, which contains a wide variety of information, including access to reservations at various amenities. Although the department has had the site since 1996, a major update occurred in 2001 as part of a strategic re-prioritization of information technology.

Tourism is a huge economic driver in Wisconsin. In 2018, the industry had a $21.6 billion impact on the state with more than 112 million visitors. Additionally, tourism in 2018 generated $1.6 billion in state and local revenue and $1.2 billion in federal taxes and supported 199,073 jobs in the state of Wisconsin. In 2021, Wisconsin tourism had a $20.9 billion total economic impact and supported more than 169,000 full and part-time jobs.

Although a department of tourism was called for by leaders as early as 1967, prior to 1995 state sponsored tourism promotion was performed as a division of other departments. The department began operations on December 24, 1995, under its first secretary Richard "Moose" Speros.

== Tourism grant programs ==
The Wisconsin Department of Tourism invests heavily in ventures around the state through grant programs.

== Attached boards ==
Four boards are attached to the Department of Tourism:

- Wisconsin Arts Board
- Kickapoo Reserve Management Board
- Wisconsin State Fair Park Board

== Past secretaries ==
=== Secretaries (1995–present) ===
Secretary	Took office	Left office	Notes
Richard Speros	December 24, 1995	January 6, 2003	Appointed by Tommy Thompson
Kevin Shibilski	January 6, 2003	May 2, 2003	Appointed by Jim Doyle
Jim Holperin	May 12, 2003	January 7, 2007	Appointed by Jim Doyle
Kelli A. Trumble	January 7, 2007	January 3, 2011	Appointed by Jim Doyle
Stephanie Klett	January 3, 2011	January 7, 2019	Appointed by Scott Walker
Sara Meaney	January 7, 2019	December 1, 2020	Appointed by Tony Evers
Anne Sayers	December 1, 2020	Current	Appointed by Tony Evers

== See also ==
- Wisconsin State Fair
