= Huntington University of Health Sciences =

Coordinates: 35.934149°N 83.963549°W

- Other name: Huntington College of Health Sciences
- Former name: American Academy of Nutrition
- Type: For-profit
- Active: 1985–2023
- Accreditation: Distance Education Accrediting Commission
- Academic affiliations: Nutrition and health
- President: Arthur M. Presser
- Provost: Gene Bruno
- Dean: Laura Farnsworth (undergrad); Chris Nutting (graduate)
- Students: 147
- Location: Knoxville, Tennessee, United States
- Website: Official website

Huntington University of Health Sciences, formerly known as the American Academy of Nutrition and Huntington College of Health Sciences, was a for-profit higher education institution based in Knoxville, Tennessee, that offered programs in nutrition and health via distance education. It opened in 1985 and closed in 2023.

It offered associate's, bachelor's, and master's degrees in nutrition and doctorates in integrative healthcare. Huntington also offers diploma programs in dietary supplement science, sports nutrition, women's nutrition, small business management, and integrated personal training.

== History ==
Huntington University of Health Sciences was founded in 1985 as the American Academy of Nutrition. It has been accredited by the Distance Education Accrediting Commission, formally the Accrediting Commission of the Distance Education and Training Council, since 1989. In 2004 the school was sold to Huntington University, L.P. In 2005 it changed its name to Huntington College of Health Sciences. According to the institution, its name honors Samuel Huntington, a Connecticut man who was among the signers of the Declaration of Independence. In 2015, Huntington University of Health Sciences, the Huntington College, was approved by the U.S. Department of Education as a Title IV institution. As a result, eligible students may apply for federal financial, including federal loans and Pell grants.

The institution changed its name from Huntington College of Health Sciences to Huntington University of Health Sciences in 2018. The university closed on August 25, 2023.

== Graduate eligibility for professional credentials ==
Graduates who successful complete specific academic programs at HUHS may be eligible to take board exams for certain national, professional credentials:

Graduates of HUHS's Diploma in Sports Nutrition (Dip.S.N.) program are eligible to take the International Society of Sports Nutrition's national board exam for Sports Nutrition Specialist.

Graduates of HUHS's B.H.S, M.S. or D.H.S. are eligible to take the certified clinical nutritionist exam through the Clinical Nutrition Certification Board. The board is a 501(c)(3) non-profit tax-exempt certification agency which provides professional training, examination and certification for health care organizations, specialty credentialing programs and state license/certification examinations.

Graduates of the A.S. or B.H.S. degree program meet the Pathway II requirements for eligibility to sit for the Certified Dietary Manager, Certified Food Protection Professional credentialing exam offered by the Dietary Managers Association.

Graduates of HUHS's B.H.S. program are eligible to take the International Society of Sports Nutrition's national board exam for Certified Sports Nutritionist, and/or their national board exam for Body Composition Certification.

Graduates of HUHS's B.H.S. or M.S. programs in Nutrition are eligible to apply for a Certified Practitioner level membership with the American Holistic Medical Association, which has served and supported physicians and other practitioners since its founding in 1978. Membership is limited to practitioners serving clients across a broad spectrum of holistic healthcare modalities, including those HUHS graduates who intend to work professionally in clinical nutrition.
