= Scott Suder =

American politician

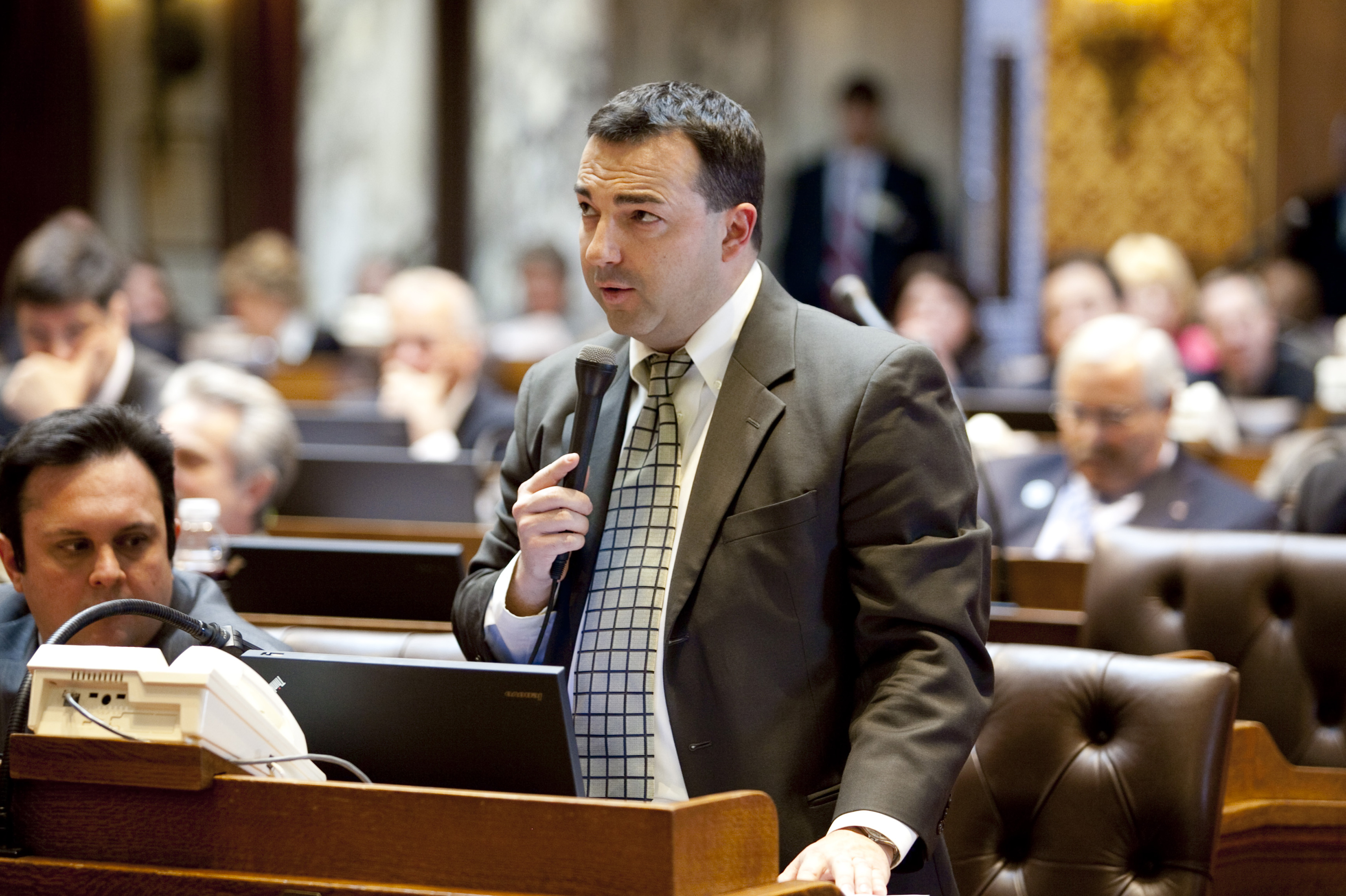
- Suder in 2009

Wisconsin State Assembly Majority Leader
- In office January 3, 2011 – September 3, 2013
- Preceded by: Tom Nelson
- Succeeded by: Bill Kramer

Member of the Wisconsin State Assembly from the 69th district
- In office January 3, 1999 – September 3, 2013
- Preceded by: Robert K. Zukowski
- Succeeded by: Bob Kulp

Personal details
- Born: September 28, 1968 (age 58) Medford, Wisconsin, U.S.
- Party: Republican
- Education: University of Wisconsin–Eau Claire
- Occupation: Staff Sergeant

Scott Suder (born September 28, 1968) is president of the Wisconsin Paper Council. Previously, he was a politician from Abbotsford, Wisconsin. He was the Republican Majority Leader of the Wisconsin State Assembly, representing the 69th district from January 1998 until September 2013. He was preceded by Robert K. Zukowski and succeeded by Bob Kulp. Suder was a member of the American Legislative Exchange Council (ALEC), serving as Wisconsin state leader.

== Background ==
Suder graduated from University of Wisconsin–Eau Claire in Eau Claire, Wisconsin. He served as an intern for the United States Congress and later served the 69th Assembly District by working as a legislative aide to State Representatives Robert K. Zukowski and Heron "Pink" Van Gorden. Suder also served on the Abbotsford Common Council 1996–2001. Suder had served his sixth term as State Representative for Wisconsin's 69th Assembly District. He is a member of the Wisconsin Air National Guard, and a veteran of Operation Iraqi Freedom. Suder had no challenger in the 2010 Wisconsin General Election.

On September 3, 2013, Suder resigned from the Wisconsin State Assembly to work for the Wisconsin Public Service Commission. However, before starting that job he took a position as a lobbyist for the Wisconsin Paper Council.

== Controversy ==
Suder was key in orchestrating a $500,000 grant in the 2013-2015 Wisconsin state budget. The grant was steered towards, and eventually granted to United Sportsmen. It was later discovered that the group had no experience in the type of work the grant was intended to provide. United Sportsmen had political ties to Wisconsin Republicans. The group also had stated they had non-profit status, which was not accurate; they had applied for non-profit status, but it was still under review and had not been granted.

The grant, as written in the Wisconsin budget, may have violated rules for federal funding and caused Wisconsin to lose $28 million in federal funds. This was avoided when Wisconsin's governor, Scott Walker, used his Line-item veto power to make the grant fully funded by Wisconsin, removing federal funds.

When the Milwaukee Journal Sentinel reported on the issues, Governor Walker rescinded the grant.

== Notes ==
Wisconsin State Assembly
Preceded by Robert K. Zukowski	Wisconsin State Representative – 69th District; January 1998 – September 2013	Succeeded by Robert Kulp
