= Francis L. Peterson =

American politician

Francis L. Peterson (January 23, 1904 – May 25, 1987) was a member of the Wisconsin State Assembly.

== Biography ==
Francis Leonard Peterson was born in Colfax, Wisconsin. He was a member of the board of the local hospital and president of the council of the local church. He died in 1987.

== Career ==
Peterson was elected to the Assembly in 1964. Previously, he was a member of the Boyceville, Wisconsin Board from 1934 to 1936 and of the Dunn County, Wisconsin Board from 1936 to 1939. He was a Republican.
