= Farmers Home Administration =

Former U.S. government agency

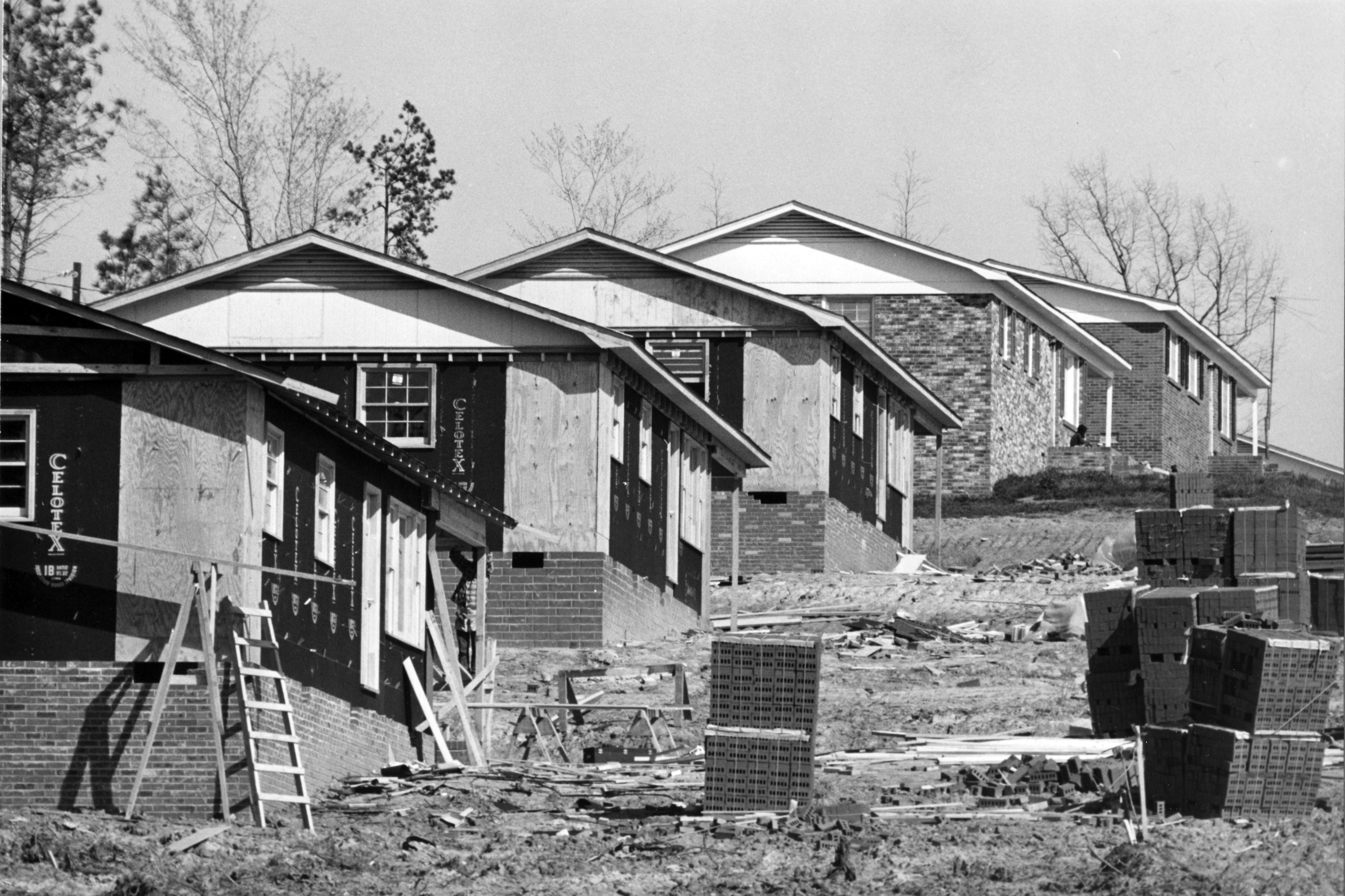
Housing financed by the Farmer's Home Administration under construction near Wadesboro, North Carolina in April 1970.

The Farmers Home Administration (FmHA) was a U.S. government agency established in August 1946 to replace the Farm Security Administration. It superseded the Resettlement Administration during the Great Depression and operated until 2006. FmHA's mission and programs involved extending credit for agriculture and rural development. Direct and guaranteed credit went to individual farmers, low-income families, and seniors in rural areas.

Loans were authorized for housing, farm improvement, water systems, and emergency relief. FmHA also gave loans and grants for rural development. The program resulted in increased African-American land ownership in the South; For instance, black landowners increased in number in Holmes County, Mississippi, during the 1940s. In 1960 there were still 800 black landowners in the county, who held 50% of the county land. Although this was the case, the FmHA favored larger-scale white farmers, making it harder for black farmers to keep their lands. Many farmers were discriminated against because of their activity in the Civil Rights Movement.

Between 1947 and 1994, the FmHA expanded the availability of credit and the size of loans. In its later years, the FmHA extended credit to individuals and communities for non-farm use. In 1994, the US Department of Agriculture was reorganized and the functions of FmHA were transferred to the Farm Service Agency. In 2006, the FmHA was fully terminated. Its housing and community programs were transferred to the newly formed USDA Rural Development.

== See also ==
- Lawrence Brock
- James Vernon Smith
