= Big Indian Farms =

- U.S. National Register of Historic Places
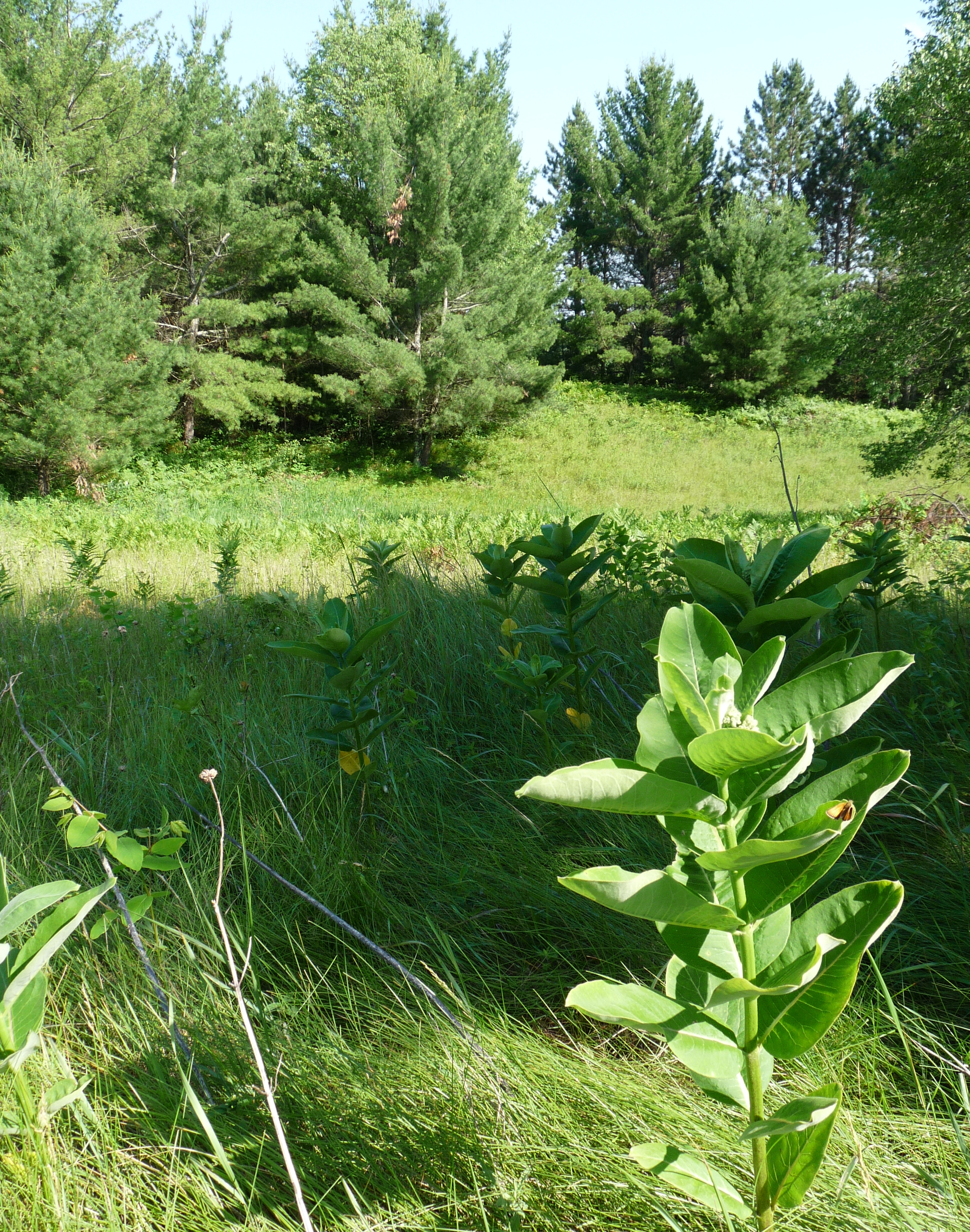
- Location: Perkinstown, Wisconsin
- NRHP reference No.: 87001827
- Added to NRHP: July 11, 1988

Big Indian Farms is a remote clearing in the Chequamegon Forest west of Medford, Wisconsin where as many as 130 Potawatomi and others lived from around 1896 to 1908. In this isolated spot they were able to practice and preserve their ancestors' culture better than if they had lived under the direct influence of the Bureau of Indian Affairs on a reservation.

The site was placed on the National Register of Historic Places in 1988.

== Background ==
The forests and rivers of north-central Wisconsin were home to various Native Americans since shortly after the last glacier receded. The Ojibwe were the final native group to dominate the area, but they sold their land rights to the U.S. in the 1837 Treaty of St. Peters, also known as the "White Pine Treaty". This treaty was part of a general effort to move natives west of the Mississippi, to secure the east for mining, logging and white settlers. Most of the Ojibwe eventually withdrew to reservations to the north. By the late 1800s few Indians of any tribe were left in Taylor County, except for a few employed in the logging industry.

Central Taylor County was once heavy forest, but by 1896 it had been logged for thirty years. Instead of the Chequamegon Forest of today, it was a patchwork of cutover slashings, occasionally scorched by runaway fires. An early settler in that area said it was so open he could see deer a mile from his house. Though a band of towns and farms ran along the Wisconsin Central Railway north and south of Medford, the rest of the county had large areas with only a smattering of settlers.

The Potawatomi did not traditionally live in this area, instead inhabiting southern Wisconsin, Illinois, Indiana and Michigan. In the 1821 Treaty of Chicago and 1833 Treaty of Chicago, they exchanged most rights to their lands for promises of cash and land west of the Mississippi. Through the 1830s, many moved to reservations in Kansas and Nebraska - some under force. The general aim of the U.S. government at this time was assimilation - to make "good American" farmers and Christians of the Indians. On the reservation their Midewiwin religion was discouraged, and many of the children were taken to Indian boarding schools like the one at Lac du Flambeau, where they were prevented from speaking their native language or learning much of their parents' culture.

But some Potawatomi evaded these removals. Others moved to the reservations but were unsatisfied, and came back. These off-reservation Indians were called "stray bands" or "strolling Potawatomi," living in less-settled areas and moving on when pressure from settlers became uncomfortable.

== Refuge ==
In 1896 a handful of Indians passed through Medford. Initially the Taylor County Star and News saw this as a good opportunity for photography, but more Indians came the next summer and the editors grumbled:

Settlers in the Town of Cleveland report that about 100 Indians are camping on the South Fork of the Yellow where they are slaughtering deer and other game in large quantities. They are also putting up hay for their ponies for next winter and have signified their intention of remaining in that neighborhood. Clearly they do not belong to any Indian reservation.

This first camp was near the present Chequamegon Waters Flowage. Perhaps because of disgruntled settlers, they soon moved to a more remote location, now called Big Indian Farms.

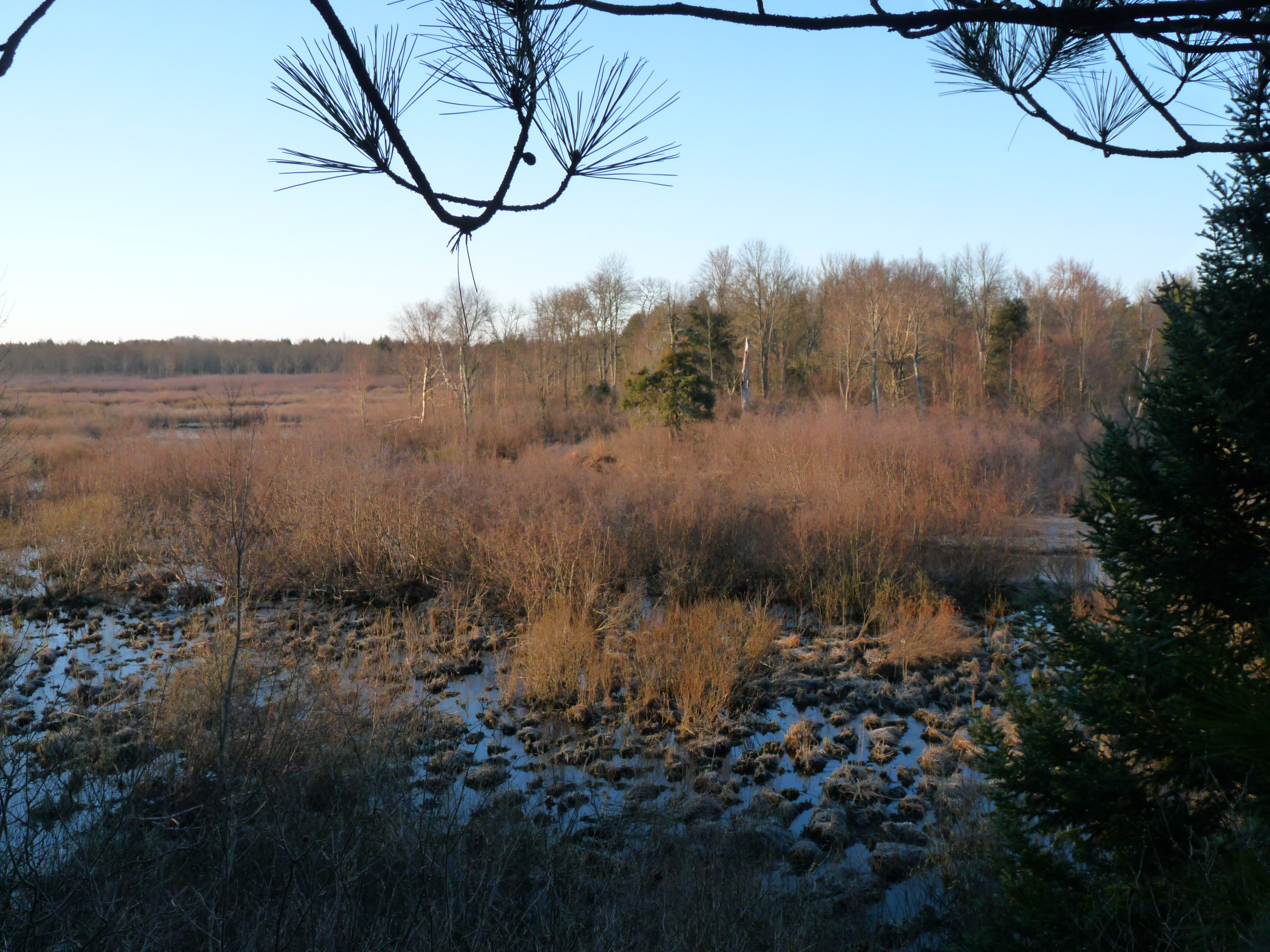
Marshes and a stream near the village provided muskrats, fish and waterfowl.

They located the village on a high grassy meadow where a logging company may have previously grazed its livestock, in an area where settlers were scarce. Nearby were large marshes where they caught muskrats to eat. Deer and other game were probably plentiful in the surrounding cut-over. They pulled earth up into raised garden beds and planted corn, onions, beans, squash and potatoes. They gathered wild ginseng in the woods, and in spring they tapped sugar maples and made syrup. Some worked in nearby logging camps. Some lived in log cabins, others probably in more traditional structures.

Most of the people at the Big Indian Farm clearing were Potawatomi, led by a respected elder named John Young (Nsowakwet). A half mile to the north a smaller group of Ojibwe lived under Paul Whitefish at a clearing called Little Indian Farm.

Before 1896 these two leaders and many of the people had lived at a similar village called Indian Farms near Rozellville in Marathon County. Before that, Young and others may have lived at Skunk Hill between Marshfield and Wisconsin Rapids. These Potawatomi belonged to the Prairie Band, who were assigned to a reservation in Kansas on the Kaw River. Young was one of the spiritual leaders who introduced the Dream Dance in Kansas.

This Dream Dance (also known as Drum Dance or Dream Religion) was started by a Dakota woman, but spread through various tribes. It represented a movement to revitalize Indian culture. Big Indian Farms had a dance ring on the crest of a hill overlooking the marshes, and the Dream Dance was almost certainly performed there, along with a Sugar Dance in spring and other dances.

Smallpox struck the village in the winter of 1900-1901 and killed 60 to 80 people. This was part of a widespread outbreak, but the people at Indian Farms may have been particularly vulnerable. The Indian Agent in Kansas wrote in his report:

...a number of the tribe who wish to lead a more primitive life... went into the forests of Wisconsin, when a smallpox of a severe type broke out during January, February, and March. They were without proper food, clothing, shelter, and had no medical attention: hence a great mortality.

The half who survived buried their dead and carried on.

Relations with white neighbors had their ups and downs. One old-timer related, "Dad got along well with the group and went to some of the powwows. The only problem about going to these powwows was while at them you were expected to eat a little dog meat with them." He tells of the Indian women coming up to his folks' place and bartering "berries and other wild foods for milk, eggs, and perhaps a chicken." The Indians traded in Westboro. John Young himself was once arrested for poaching deer, and was jailed in Medford.

Around 1908 the last Indians left. John Young and many of his followers moved on to McCord and eventually became part of the Forest County Potawatomi. The Whitefishes moved to Diamond Lake near Lublin.

== The site today ==
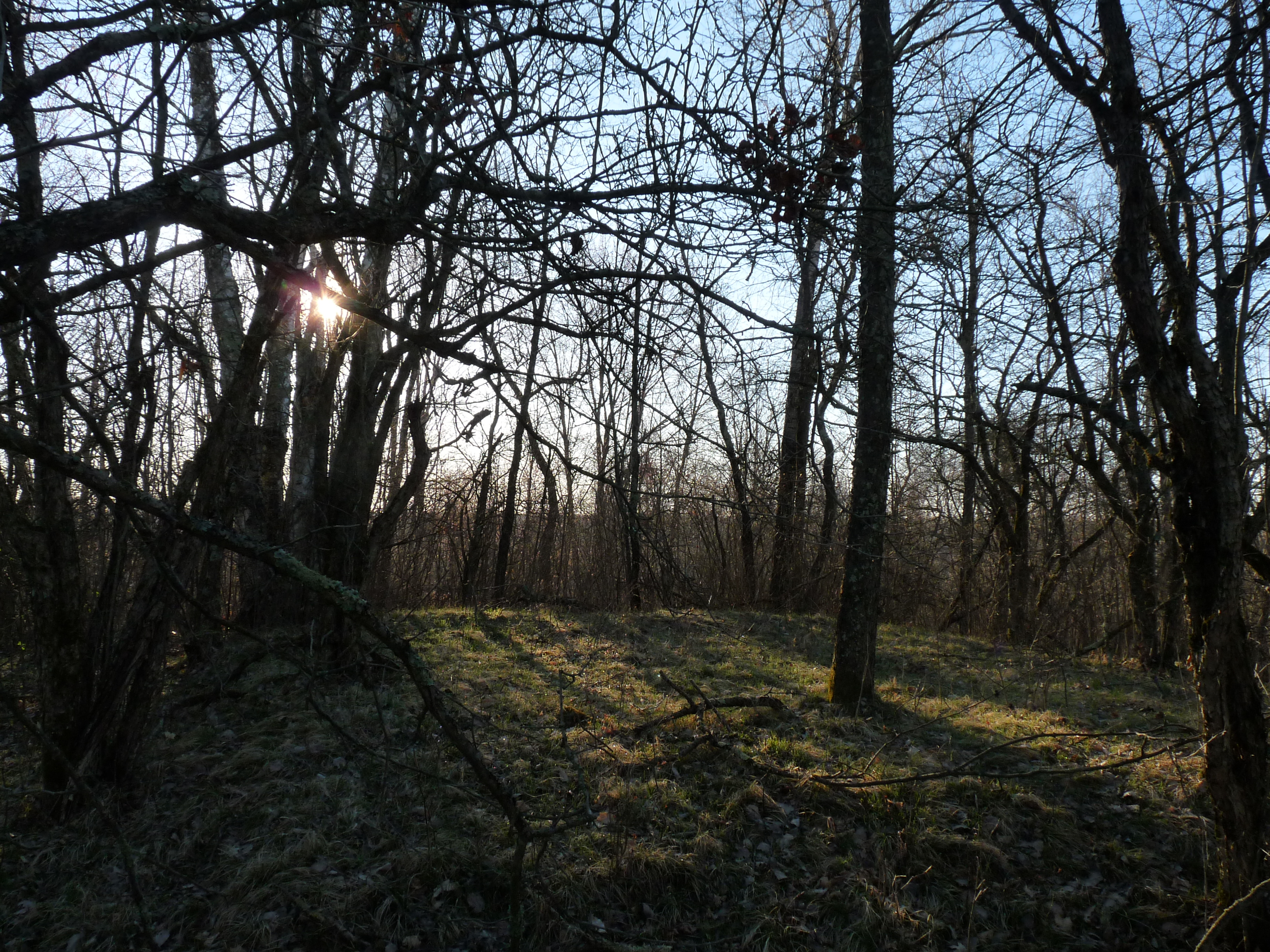
Cabin foundation on a May morning, flanked by thornapple and cherry

After the Potawatomi and Ojibwe tribes left, a farmer plowed much of the clearing at Big Indian Farm. For decades afterwards, the burial mounds were dug and raided by settlers.

Little Indian Farm and its surrounding area remains largely as it was left in the 1800s. The site is not convenient for visitors, who may encounter mosquitoes, wood ticks and poison ivy.

In 2007, the Forest Service purchased the land holding Little Indian Farm. In 2020, work began on a new NRHP nomination to add Little Indian Farm to the district, and to collect stories from Potawatomi and Ojibwe descendants about life at the Farms, and what happened to their families after they moved on.

== See also ==
- National Register of Hististings in Taylor County, Wisconsin
