= Government Boarding School at Lac du Flambeau =

- U.S. National Register of Historic Places
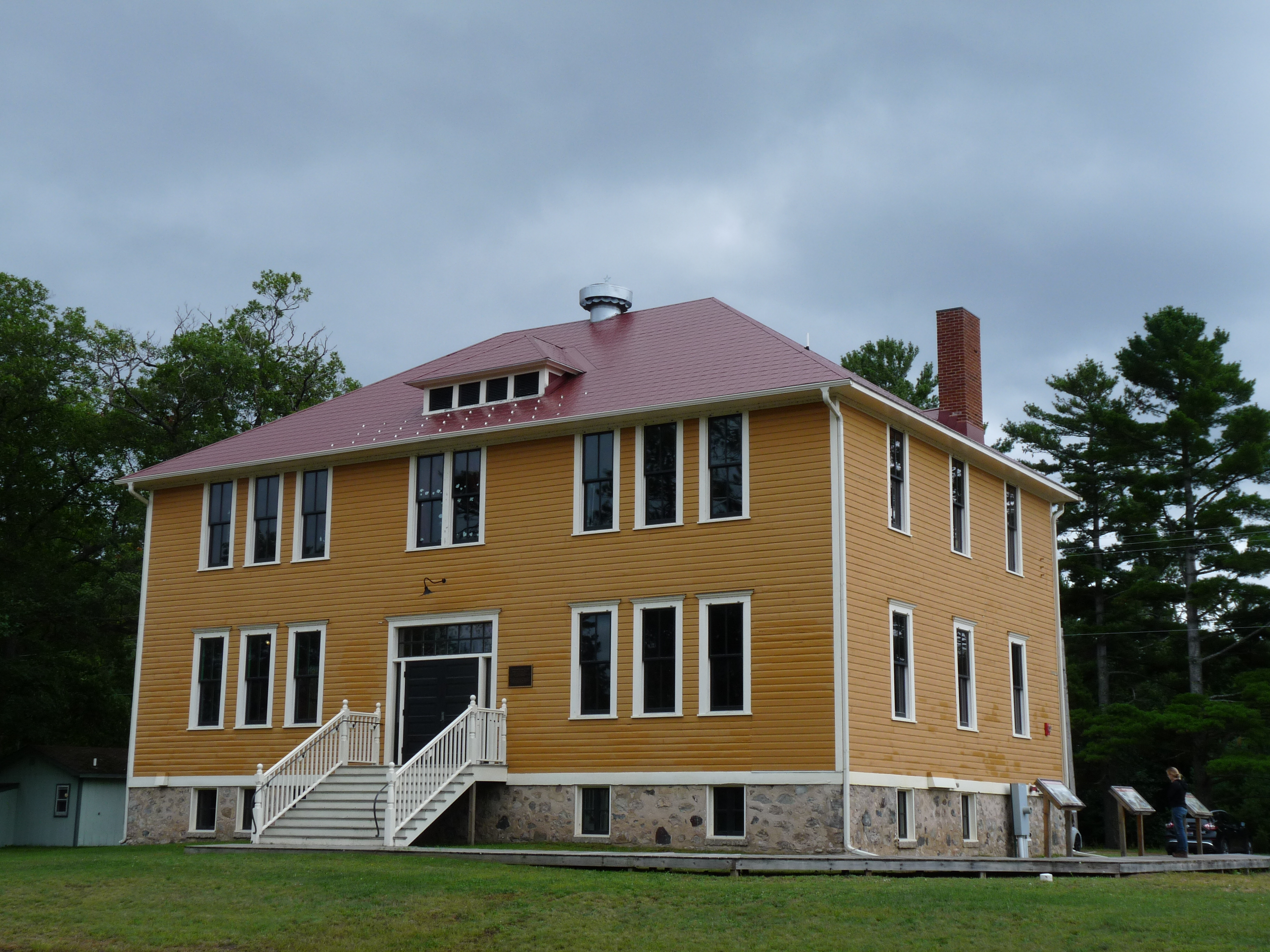
- The boys' dormitory
- Location: Lac du Flambeau, Wisconsin
- NRHP reference No.: 040001005

The Government Boarding School at Lac du Flambeau in Lac du Flambeau, Wisconsin was a school where Native American children of the Ojibwe, Potowatomi and Odawa peoples were taught mainstream American culture from 1895 to 1932. It served grades 1-8, teaching both academic and practical subjects, intended to give children skills needed for their rural societies. The school was converted in 1932 to a day school, serving only Ojibwe children and those nearby of other tribes.

After 1975 and passage of national legislation for self-determination, the Ojibwe tribe at Lac du Flambeau took over control of the school. They now use the boys' dormitory for offices for historic preservation, Ojibwe language, and cultural activities.

The boys' dormitory is one of the remaining structures of what was a large multi-building complex on 300 acres. It had a variety of support buildings and, when a boarding school, raised its own produce and livestock. The school complex was added to the National Register of Historic Places in 2005 as one of the historic sites in Vilas County.

== History ==
The Ojibwe people have a long history at Lac du Flambeau. About 1745 under Giishkiman (Sharpened Stone), they settled where the Bear River flows out of Flambeau Lake. In 1792 the North West Fur Company added a trading post there, which operated until about 1835. A Presbyterian missionary visited, starting in 1832. The Lac du Flambeau Indian Reservation was established here in 1854.

When timber companies discovered the resources, major logging began in the winter of 1885. Officially, the BIA leased the land for fees that were supposed to be returned to the tribe and held in trust or paid to heads of households. Many such trust funds were mismanaged. The first United States Indian agent was assigned to the area in 1888. The first church was built in 1894.

Through much of the 19th and 20th centuries, the U.S. government policies were intended to assimilate Native Americans into European-American culture. Rationalizing boarding schools, one Indian agent wrote in 1886, "Only by complete isolation of the Indian child from his savage antecedents can he be satisfactorily educated..." By separating Indian children from their families, the government believed that they could more easily educate children to speak English and mainstream American culture, and prepare them to fit into American society as farmers or laborers, which were typical of opportunities in rural societies. But in the process, they damaged Ojibwe and other Native American children by stripping them of their own culture and traditions.

Ojibwe children were forced to government boarding schools as early as 1856. In 1895 the Bureau of Indian Affairs opened the boarding school at Lac du Flambeau. This was not the only such school in Wisconsin; by 1899 the Menominee Boarding School at Keshena and the Oneida Boarding School at Oneida had been opened. There were also non-government Indian boarding schools, such as Saint Mary's at Odanah, operated by Franciscan Sisters as a mission school on the Bad River reservation. The Lutheran church operated Wittenberg School. The Tomah Industrial School in Tomah, Wisconsin also was opened at this time. Some Ojibwe children attended government day schools, such as one at Lac Courte Oreilles. Others were sent to off-reservation boarding schools, such as that at Carlisle, Pennsylvania.

Children from the tribes ages five to fifteen were required to attend the school at Lac du Flambeau, essentially encompassing grades 1-8. this was typical of public education even in towns and many cities; public high schools were not generally available. Some students went to private academies or seminaries to get more education. At the boarding school, the children were forced to abandon their Ojibwe or other Native American languages, ceremonies, foods and clothing. Breaking these rules resulted in physical punishment. The school was year-round, with no summer break, to provide for more immersion and more effectively interrupt the passing of Native culture and replace it with Euro-American culture. In addition, for children at a distance from their homes, it was difficult and expensive to arrange transportation back and forth.

At the beginning, the school was a complex of seven or eight buildings, with a total of 300 acres. Given the rural nature of the area, these schools struggled to be self-sufficient, raising their own food like a family farm or village. Children were expected to work, in part to teach them about farming, practical skills, and processing crops and food. The surviving building pictured above is the boys' dormitory, built around 1895. Over the years more buildings were added to form a quad around a marching field. The buildings included "three dormitories, a classroom, ice houses, warehouses, root cellars, a hospital, a laundry, a steam plant/boiler room, a carpenter shop, a blacksmith shop, a carriage house, a clubhouse, ... barns, a silo, a hen house, a pig house, and a fish hatchery."

The academic curriculum was standard for the time: arithmetic, reading, spelling, ethics, civics, geography, drawing, history, written and oral language, physiology, current events, music and nature. As the children advanced, the curriculum became more practical, an effort to give the children skills for modern western life. Boys learned farming and gardening, stock raising and dairying, carpentry and masonry, shoe and harness repair, engineering, blacksmithing, and painting. Girls learned child-rearing, home training, home nursing, poultry-raising, cooking, sewing, and laundering. The older students did some of the work that fed and maintained the school.

This is a typical weekday schedule:

 5:30 AM  Rising and drills
 6:30     Assembly
 6:45     Breakfast
 7:25     Warning signal - Industrial departments
 7:30     Industrial departments begin work
 8:30     First signal for academic work
 8:45     Second signal for academic work
11:30     Recall signal - all departments
11:50     Assembly signal
12:00     Dinner
12:55 PM  Warning signal - Industrial departments
 1:00     Industrial departments begin work
 1:00     First signal for academic work
 1:15     Second signal for academic work
 4:00     Recall signal - academic departments
 5:00     Recall signal - industrial departments
 5:20     Assembly
 5:30     Supper
 6:50     First signal for evening hour
 7:00     Evening hour
 7:30     Small pupils retire
 9:00     Large pupils retire

On the weekends, children were given some time for recreation, but it was also a period of inspection of their living spaces, which were to be kept orderly. Sunday morning each child attended either Protestant or Catholic worship services.

Most of the students at Lac du Flambeau were Ojibwe, Potawatomi and Odawa from northern Wisconsin, with a few from other communities. Some children were forcibly taken from their families by the school superintendent and disciplinarian, along with tribal policemen.

In 1898 Charley Catfish of Lac du Flambeau sent this letter to the Indian agent at La Pointe:

Mr Agent esq will pleas tell me if Mr. Parash has the power to go and take our children away frome us without our consient that is I mean frome thay mother or father one of my nabors has a child taken away frome him and the child was nursing yet we think he is too young to go to school the Boy is foor years old that is too young to go to school and the Boy is sick over it and of corse the mother and father is feeling very Bad over it pleas let us indins know if he has the power to take our children with out our own consient of corse you know I am not doing this on my own hook I am writing for the Balance of my friends address
charley catfish
lac du flambeau res Wis

The agent answered that no child that young was in the school.

To keep their children and preserve their culture, some native people chose to live off-reservation, beyond the reach of the school and Indian agent. For examples in central Wisconsin, see Powers Bluff and Big Indian Farms.

By the 1920s the federal government was questioning the effectiveness of the boarding schools. A 1928 report (informally known as the Meriam Report) entitled The Problem of Indian Administration stated of the schools in general:

The survey staff finds itself obliged to say frankly and unequivocally that the provisions for the care of the Indian children in boarding schools are grossly inadequate. The diet is deficient in quantity, quality, and variety.... The boarding schools are crowded materially beyond their capacities.... In nearly every boarding school one will find children of 10, 11, and 12 spending four hours a day in more or less heavy industrial work—dairy, kitchen work, laundry, shop. The work is bad for children of this age, especially children not physically well-nourished; most of it is in no sense educational since the operations are large-scale and bear little relation to either home or industrial life outside.... Nearly every boarding school visited furnished disquieting illustrations of failure to understand the underlying principles of human behavior. Punishments of the most harmful sort are bestowed in sheer ignorance, often in a sincere attempt to be of help. Routinization is the one method used for everything; though all that we know indicates its weakness as a method in education. If there were any real knowledge of how human beings are developed through their behavior, we should not have in the Indian boarding schools the mass movements from dormitory to dining room, from dining room to classroom, from classroom back again, all completely controlled by external authority...

In the 1920s Native crafts was added to the curriculum at Lac du Flambeau. By 1932 the school had shifted from a boarding school to a day school.

But, "The effects of the school were devastating to the tribal community. Traditional spiritual beliefs were replaced by Christianity, traditional dances by square dances and traditional languages by English. Within two generations, the boarding school had created a population of young adults who did not fit into either the traditional reservation culture or the surrounding white communities."

After passage of the Indian Self-Determination and Education Assistance Act of 1975 in 1975, the school was transferred to the Ojibwe people for their direct management and operation. They contracted with the BIA for the funds to operate it. It has been adapted for current tribal uses. For instance, today the boys' dormitory houses offices of the LDF Tribal Historic Preservation Program, the Ojibwe Language Program, and the Cultural Activities Program.

In 2000 the Department of Interior formally apologized for actions of the BIA "that in the past has committed acts so terrible that they infect, diminish and destroy the lives of Indian people decades later, generations later." In 2009 U.S. President Barack Obama signed into law a similar apology. The sign-board outside the school observes, "...the Boy's Dormitory... towering over the state highway, is a constant reminder of the near destruction of Native language and culture. It is preserved as a memorial to all the children who passed through its doors."
