= National Register of Historic Places listings in Taylor County, Wisconsin =

Location of Taylor County in Wisconsin

Taylor County, Wisconsin, has eight properties and districts listed on the National Register of Historic Places.

The locations of National Register properties for which the latitude and longitude coordinates are included below may be seen in a map.

This National Park Service list is complete through NPS recent listings posted September 11, 2026.

== Current listings ==
	Name on the Register	Image	Date listed	Location	City or town	Description
1	J. W. Benn Building	J. W. Benn Building	December 22, 1983 (#83004320)	202-204 S. Main St. 45°08′14″N 90°20′37″W	Medford	This 1912 Beaux-Arts building housed the post office until the 1930s, then Gruener's Bakery, and now Damm Accounting.
2	Big Indian Farms	Big Indian Farms	July 11, 1988 (#87001827)	Address Restricted	Perkinstown	About 100 "stray band" Potawatomi, Chippewa and others lived at this remote site from 1896 to 1908. Includes burials and dance ring.
3	Jump River Town Hall	Jump River Town Hall	March 28, 1974 (#74000127)	S of WI 73 on Bridge Dr. 45°21′07″N 90°48′10″W	Jump River	1915 example of Prairie School architecture, designed by Purcell & Elmslie to suggest a logging camp building, or possibly a wannigan.
4	Medford Free Public Library	Medford Free Public Library	April 1, 1993 (#93000259)	104 E. Perkins St. 45°08′02″N 90°20′30″W	Medford	This Carnegie library was designed in Prairie School style by Wausau architect Hans Liebert and built in 1916.
5	Medford Post Office	Medford Post Office	October 24, 2000 (#00001244)	304 S. Main St. 45°08′11″N 90°20′36″W	Medford	The Colonial Revival-styled post office was built in 1937. It is now used by other businesses.
6	Mondeaux Dam Recreation Area	Mondeaux Dam Recreation Area	August 21, 1984 (#84003784)	Roughly bounded by Mondeaux River and Forest Rd. 45°20′01″N 90°27′03″W	Westboro	Flowage, campgrounds, and lodge, built by the WPA and CCCs from 1936 to 1938.
7	Saint Ann's Catholic Church and Cemetery	Saint Ann's Catholic Church and Cemetery	December 14, 1995 (#95001455)	W3963 Brehm Ave. 45°16′50″N 90°15′02″W	Greenwood	Classic wooden Gothic Revival church built in 1888, at a rural crossroads a few miles east of Chelsea.
8	Taylor County Courthouse	Taylor County Courthouse	May 14, 1980 (#80000198)	224 S. 2nd, Courthouse Sq. 45°08′15″N 90°20′31″W	Medford	Classical Revival courthouse with metal clock dome designed by B. Mehner and built in 1913.

== See also ==
- List of National Historic Landmarks in Wisconsin
- National Register of Historic Places listings in Wisconsin
- Listings in neighboring counties: Chippewa, Clark, Lincoln, Marathon, Price, Rusk
