= J. W. Benn Building =

- U.S. National Register of Historic Places
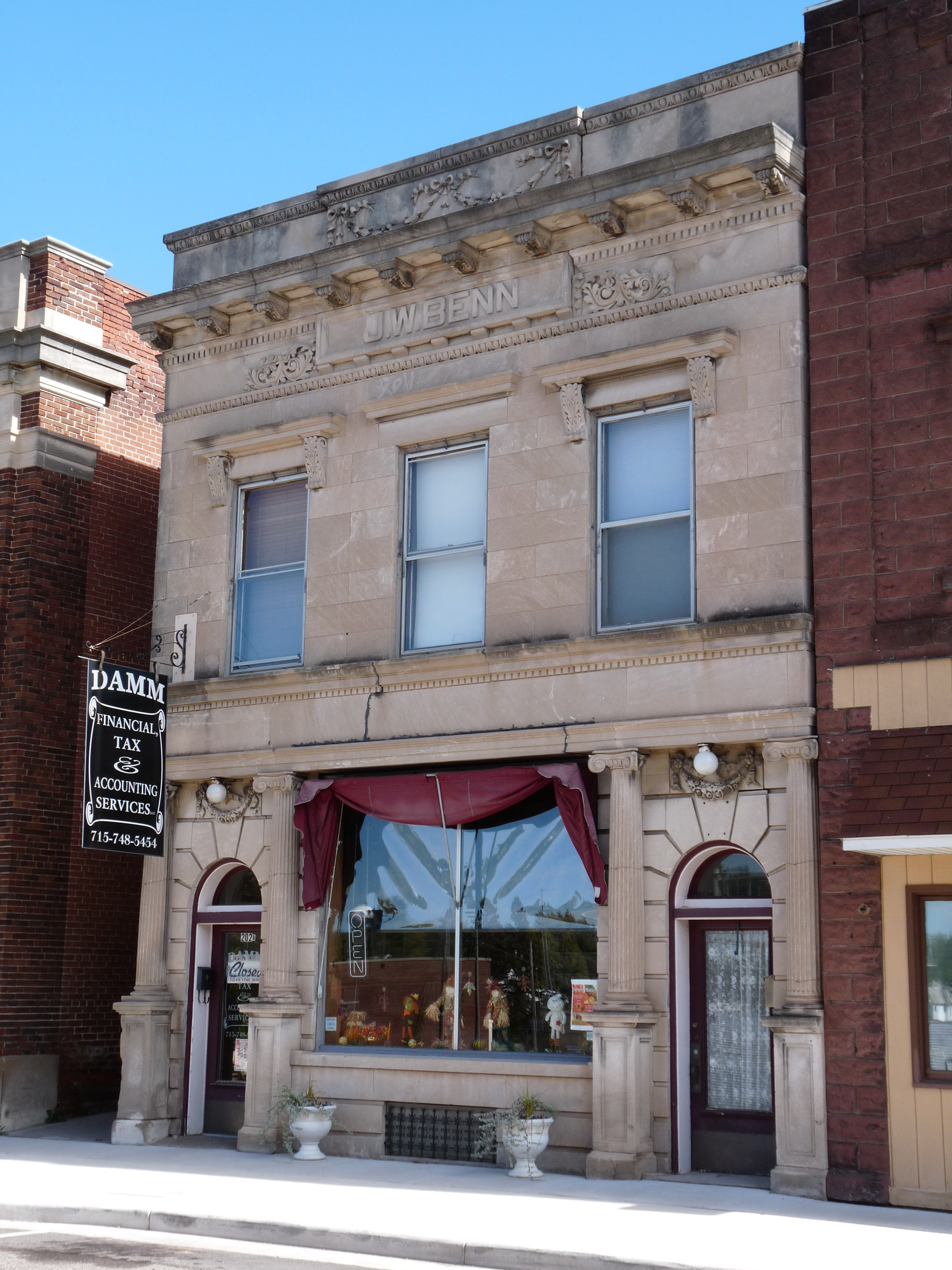
- Location: 202–204 S. Main St. Medford, Wisconsin
- Coordinates: 45.13721°N 90.3442°W
- Built: 1912
- Architectural style: Beaux-Arts
- NRHP reference No.: 83004320
- Added to NRHP: December 22, 1983

The J. W. Benn Building is a Beaux-Arts-Classic-styled commercial building located in downtown Medford, Wisconsin. John W. Benn had it built in 1912 as a private post office. It was added to the National Register of Historic Places in 1983.

John W. Benn was born in Germany in 1876 and arrived in Medford with his family in 1884, seven years old. In 1909 he was appointed Postmaster of Medford. At that time, the federal government had no publicly owned post office in Medford, so Benn proceeded to build his own (not unusual at the time), right in the center of the city's business district. For this important building he chose an elegant style, suggestive of ancient Rome.

The limestone front of his building is in Beaux-Arts Classical style, symmetric with Ionic columns flanking each door. Above the second-story windows are an entablature and cornice decorated with relief sculptures of leaves, a garland, and the name "J W BENN". (The NRHP nomination form linked below gives a more detailed architectural description.) Inside, the first floor housed the post office and the second floor was living quarters.

Benn served as postmaster only until 1913, when President Wilson appointed his replacement, but his building was Medford's post office until 1938, when the U.S. government built Medford's first public post office building, just up the street. Meanwhile, Benn went on to serve as Taylor County's Register of Deeds. He died in 1955. After 1938, Benn's building housed a tavern, Gruener's bakery, and now Damm Accounting.

Architectural historian Steve Sennott explains the building's significance in his NRHP nomination: In its correctness and adherence to architectural principles that guide the application of the Classical Orders, proportions, and symmetrical façade elements, the Benn block in Medford represents on a local level one of the finer Beaux-Arts Classical public buildings in Wisconsin.

== See also ==
- National Register of Historic Places listings in Taylor County, Wisconsin
