= Green Valley, Marathon County, Wisconsin =

Green Valley, Wisconsin
- Town
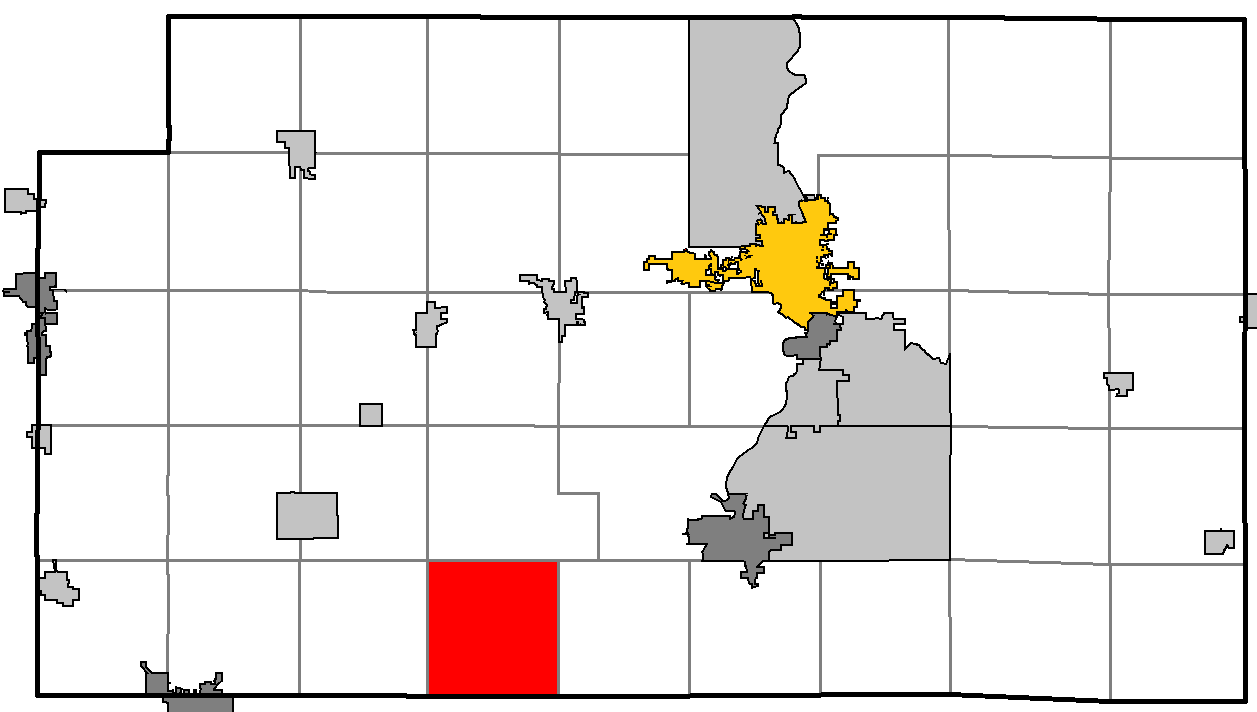
- Location of Green Valley, Marathon County

- Location of Marathon County, Wisconsin
- Coordinates: 44°44′43″N 89°54′23″W
- Country: United States
- State: Wisconsin
- County: Marathon

Area
  - Total: 35.2 sq mi (91.1 km^{2})
  - Land: 28.9 sq mi (74.9 km^{2})
  - Water: 6.2 sq mi (16.1 km^{2})
- Elevation: 1,129 ft (344 m)

Population (2020)
  - Total: 515
  - Density: 17.8/sq mi (6.88/km^{2})
- Time zone: UTC-6 (Central (CST))
  - Summer (DST): UTC-5 (CDT)
- Area codes: 715 & 534
- FIPS code: 55-31450
- GNIS feature ID: 1583320

Green Valley is a town in Marathon County, Wisconsin, United States. It is part of the Wausau, Wisconsin Metropolitan Statistical Area. The population was 515 at the 2020 census. The unincorporated community of Rangeline is located partially in the town.

== Geography ==
According to the United States Census Bureau, the town has a total area of 35.2 square miles (91.1 km^{2}), of which 28.9 square miles (74.9 km^{2}) is land and 6.2 square miles (16.2 km^{2}), or 17.74%, is water.

== Demographics ==
As of the census of 2000, there were 514 people, 192 households, and 149 families in the town. The population density was 17.8 people per square mile (6.9/km^{2}). There were 249 housing units at an average density of 8.6 per square mile (3.3/km^{2}). The racial makeup of the town was 99.61% White, 0.19% Native American and 0.19% Asian.

29.7% of the 192 homes had children under the age of 18, 69.8% were married couples living together, 3.1% had a female householder without a husband, and 21.9% were non-families.19.3% of households were one person and 6.8% were one person aged 65 or older. The average household size was 2.68 and the average family size was 3.07.

The age distribution was 22.8% under the age of 18, 7.2% from 18 to 24, 29.4% from 25 to 44, 27.2% from 45 to 64, and 13.4% 65 or older. The median age was 40 years. For every 100 females, there were 116.9 males. For every 100 females age 18 and over, there were 124.3 males.

The median household income was $49,250 and the median family income was $58,068. Males had a median income of $38,125 versus $24,063 for females. The per capita income for the town was $21,048. About 6.1% of families and 6.2% of the population were below the poverty line, including 6.7% of those under age 18 and 9.0% of those age 65 or over.
