= Taylor County Courthouse (Wisconsin) =

- U.S. National Register of Historic Places
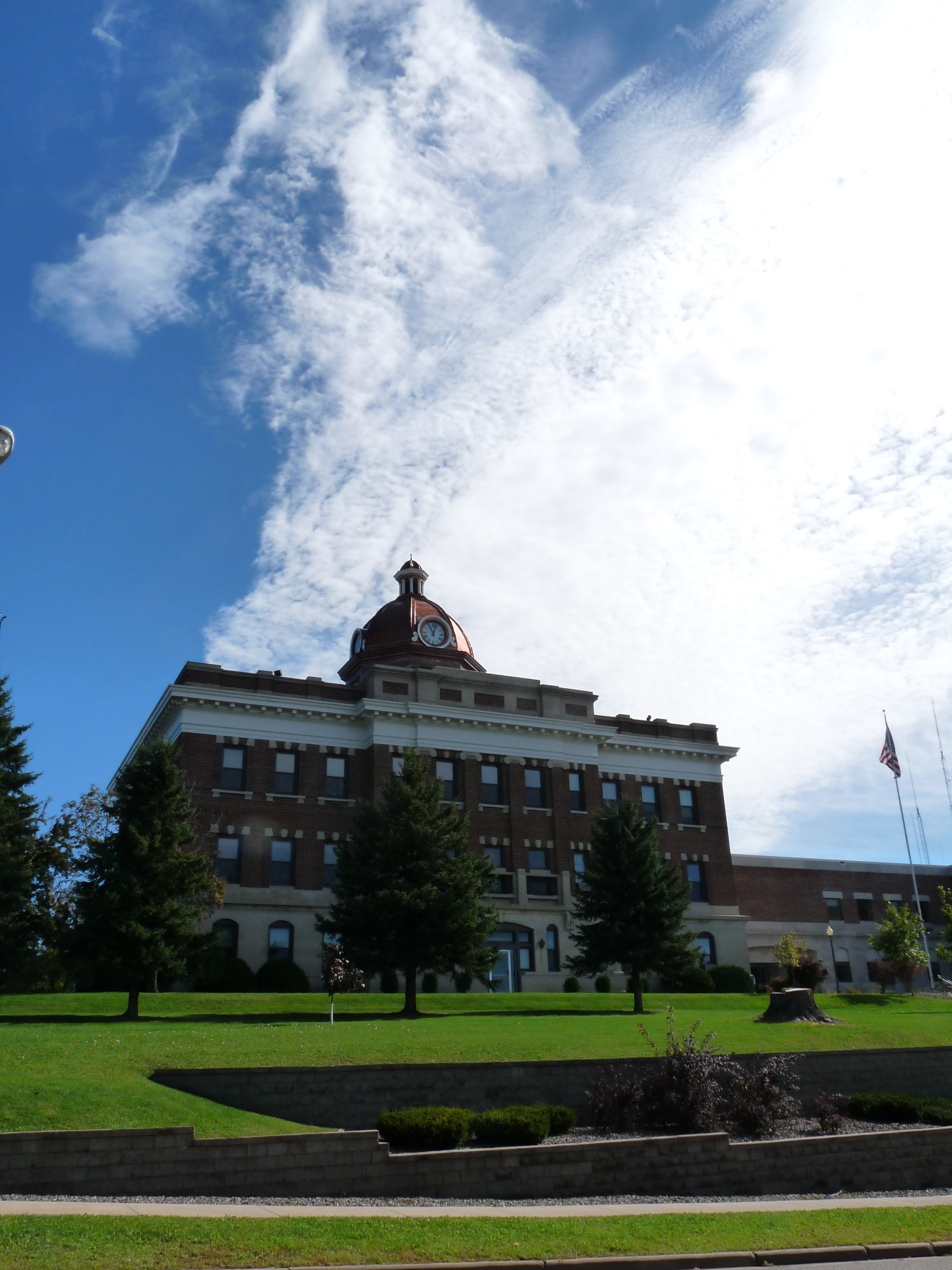
- Taylor County Courthouse

- Location within Wisconsin Location within the United States
- Interactive map showing the location for Taylor County Courthouse
- Location: 224 S. Courthouse Sq. Medford, Wisconsin
- Coordinates: 45.13729°N 90.34205°W
- Built: 1913
- Architectural style: Classical Revival
- NRHP reference No.: 80000198
- Added to NRHP: May 14, 1980

The current Taylor County Courthouse, built in 1914, is a Neoclassical-styled three-story building with a metal-clad dome, located in Medford, Wisconsin. It was added to the National Register of Historic Places in 1980. It was preceded by a courthouse built in 1876 on the same site.

== 1876 Courthouse ==
Taylor County was established on March 4, 1875, formed from parts of larger-than-today Clark, Marathon, Chippewa and Lincoln counties. Plans began almost immediately for a courthouse in Medford.

That first courthouse was built where the current courthouse sits, but the siting was controversial. Two local mill owners, Roberts and Whelen, offered five acres on the west side of the Black River for the courthouse, provided the county buy their lumber for construction at the usual price. The Wisconsin Central Railroad offered a different site for the courthouse, east of the river. Some residents supported Roberts and Whelen, but the County Board of Supervisors accepted the railroad's offer, claiming Roberts and Whelen's site was river bottom. The Board's selection of a bid for construction was itself controversial, because the $15,000 price was considered high, and was not the lowest bid. A town meeting followed in which Roberts and Whelen's site resoundingly won the vote. The county board nixed that and contracted for a courthouse at the railroad's site. But Whelen and his allies got an injunction against that plan and started building a courthouse west of the river. The mess ended up in the state Senate as a bill for the Whelen proposal, countered by a memorandum signed by 440 county citizens against the bill. The Senate passed the bill, but the Assembly sent it into committee, which buried it. In spring of 1876 the courthouse was built east of the river at the Wisconsin Central's site for a price of $5,360.75. Arthur Latton later wrote:

The fight caused so much hard feeling that it made enemies of former friends for a generation. ... Whelen, the energetic, public spirited citizen who had done so much for the new settlement in a business way, and who had almost single-handedly secured the creation of the new county and the location of the county seat at Medford, must have been a very disappointed man. After all the contention and wrangling, he died in September and was buried in Green Bay.

This first courthouse, built on the site of the modern courthouse, was an elegant two-story wooden building with narrow windows and a tall cupola. It was expanded in 1889 to meet growing needs for space.

== 1914 Courthouse ==
The 1876 courthouse was built in the boom of the county's railroad-logging era. By 1912, when the county began seriously thinking about replacing the old courthouse, most of the best timber had been cut off. The stated reasons for replacing the courthouse revolved around its vault, which was supposed to protect important records. People were aware that when the United States General Land Office in Eau Claire burned, documents in its supposedly safe vault were destroyed - documents which could not be replaced. Twenty years later, one of the members of the building committee wrote:

The [other] reason, not publicly discussed but fully considered by some progressive members of the board, was that the courthouse should be built now because the original wealth of Taylor County timber was fast disappearing, thus leaving the financing and payment of the new courthouse to the farmers and the endless slashings.... If the building had been postponed or had the plan for financing the building by long term bond issue been approved, as it was suggested by some lumbering interests, the farmers and bona fide citizens would have had to pay the bill."

Much of the original trim remains intact. Inside the ground floor.

The new courthouse was designed by Baldwin Mehner, a son of Dorchester, who had designed the Calumet County Courthouse shortly before. Hutter Construction won the building contract with a $57,203 bid and began building in 1913. The dedication ceremony was September 9, 1914, with fireworks, a $150 prize for best decorated automobile, a $30 prize for best driving horses, and $15 for a tug-of-war contest between the different townships.

The final building (today's building, pictured above) is three stories, with the first floor clad in limestone and upper two in red brick. The dome on top is octagonal and metal-clad, with clocks on four sides. Initially the first floor and second floors were occupied by county offices and the third floor housed the circuit court. In the 1950s the building's electrical system was upgraded. In 2007, windows were replaced and the exterior brick was cleaned and repointed. The county celebrated the 100-year anniversary of the building on September 6, 2014.

Door to the Register of Deeds' vault. The courthouse ended up with a 2-story deed vault with walls of 8-inch steel plus concrete - designed to be fireproof and storm-proof. Inside the vault, many of the records are bound in old deed books going back to the 1870s, on roller-shelving. The oldest are hand-written.

== See also ==
- National Register of Historic Places listings in Taylor County, Wisconsin
