= Historic St. Ann's (Greenwood, Taylor County, Wisconsin) =

Historic church in Wisconsin, United States

- Saint Ann's Catholic Church and Cemetery
- U.S. National Register of Historic Places
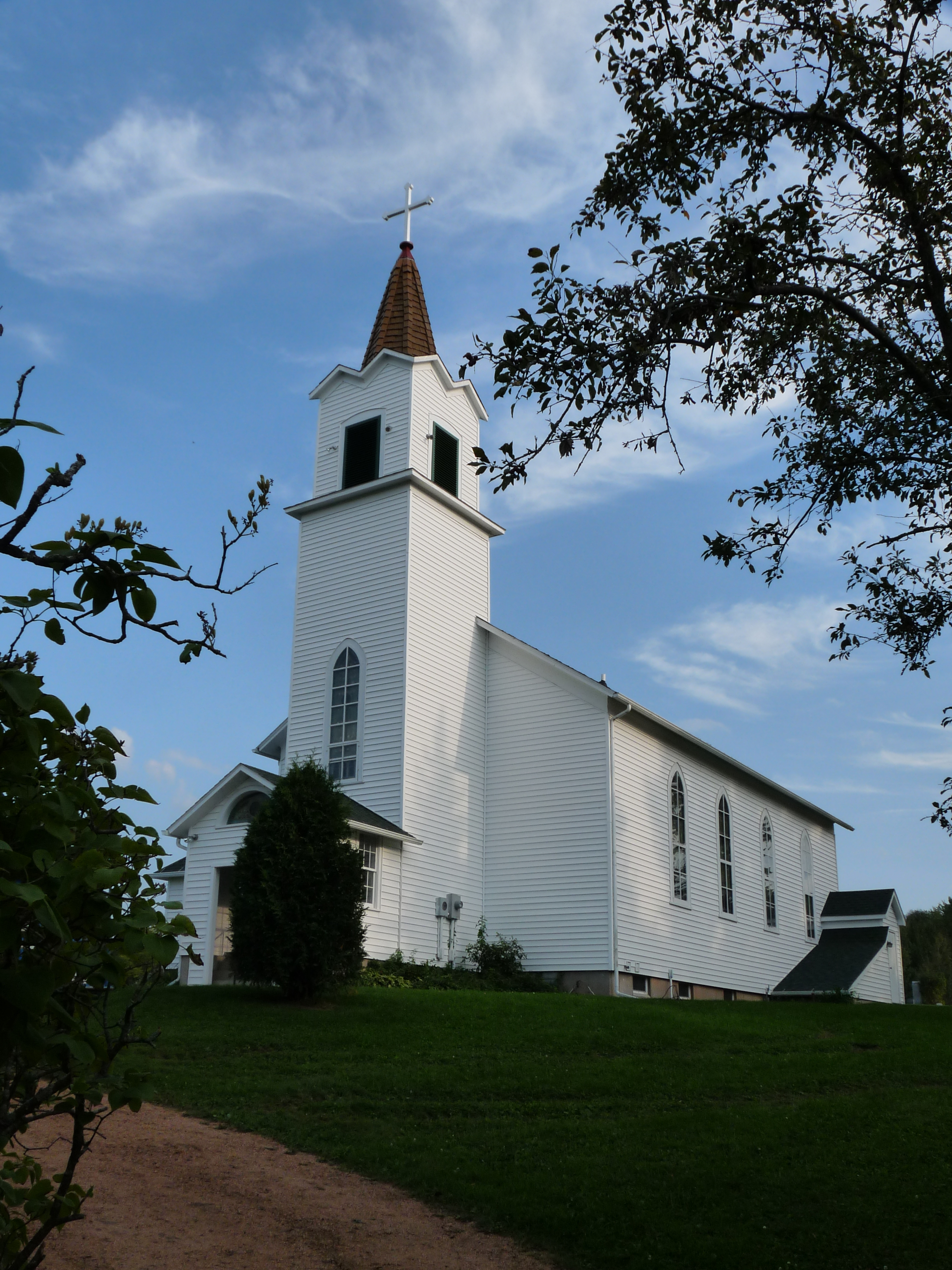

- Location within Wisconsin Location within the United States
- Location: W3963 Brehm Ave., Greenwood, Taylor County, Wisconsin
- Coordinates: 45°16′50″N 90°15′2″W
- Area: 3 acres (1.2 ha)
- Built: 1888
- Architectural style: Late Gothic Revival
- NRHP reference No.: 95001455
- Added to NRHP: December 14, 1995

Saint Ann's Catholic Church and Cemetery is a historic rural, Roman Catholic church in the town of Greenwood, Taylor County, Wisconsin, United States. It is located at W3963 Brehm Avenue, south of Rib Lake and north of Medford. The property was added to the National Register of Historic Places in 1995.

== History ==
=== St. Ann's Catholic Church and Cemetery ===
The community that built St. Anne's was chiefly German and German-Bohemian, mainly people who immigrated from around the border between Bohemia and Bavaria from 1881 to 1883. Clergy first came to St. Anne's community by horseback or rail for services in homes. In 1884 the Wisconsin Central Railroad donated a one-acre site for the church. In 1888, following approval of Bishop Kilian Caspar Flasch of the Diocese of La Crosse, construction of the church and adjacent cemetery began. Next to the church to the west was the Highland School: further, in 1892, the Thums General Store and Post Office was built across the road. With that, this rural crossroads formed the center of a fairly self-contained community.

The first Mass was offered at St. Anne's on September 25, 1888 by Rev. J. W. Ritz. When a rectory was built in 1902 at Rib Lake for St. John the Baptist Church, Rev. Joseph Heeger, that church's first resident pastor also served St. Ann's congregation. Services were conducted in German from the start until 1915.

In 1905, administration of St. Anne's was transferred to the new Diocese of Superior. In 1908, a statue of Mary was donated by St. Ann's Altar Society.

The cemetery immediately behind the church contains graves dating to 1887, including founders of the church. Two of the graves are marked by ornate iron crosses in a style which the old-timers knew from their home in "old country."

The church was wired for electricity in 1933, using light fixtures that had come from Medford State Bank, but electric power didn't become available until 1946. During the 1940s, a new oil burning furnace was installed.

In 1963, the diocese closed St. Ann's Church because of a shortage of clergy. After closing, the diocese maintained insurance coverage, but routine maintenance and upkeep declined. In 1983, parishioners were presented with several options, two of which involved demolition. They chose to form a non-profit organization responsible for care and maintenance of the building and grounds.

=== Historic St. Ann's ===
Local preservationists and former parish members purchased the church and cemetery from the Diocese of Superior and formed Historic St. Ann's Inc.. Articles of incorporation were filed on August 12, 1988. Over the years, through annual work bees, members have enhanced the building, grounds and cemetery property. The 2013 annual St. Anne's newsletter describes the many projects completed in the past 25 years.

== See also ==
- National Register of Historic Places listings in Taylor County, Wisconsin
