= Calumet County Courthouse =

- U.S. National Register of Historic Places
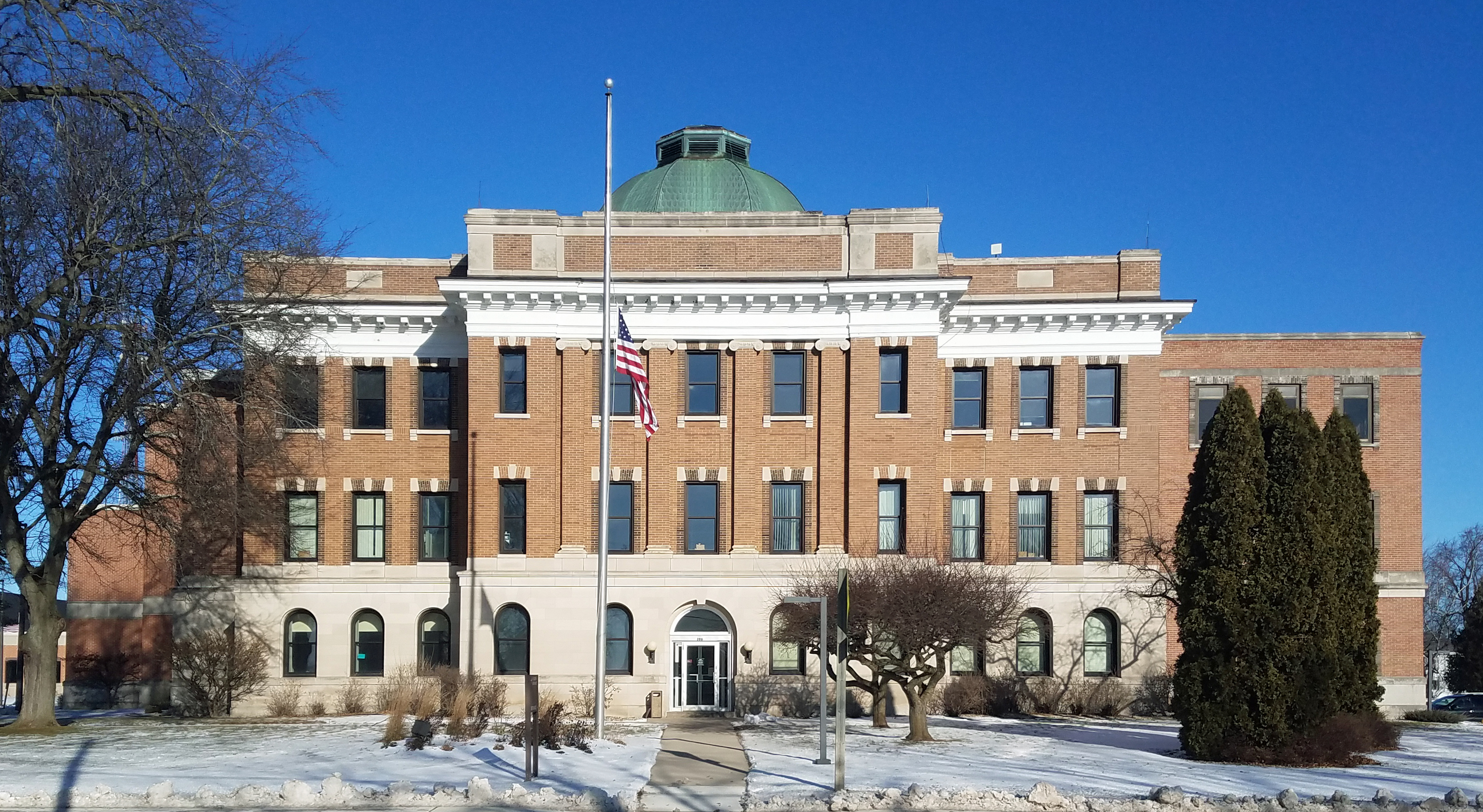
- The Calumet County Courthouse from the south

- Location within Wisconsin Location within the United States
- Interactive map showing the location for Calumet County Courthouse
- Location: 206 Court Street, Chilton, Wisconsin
- Coordinates: 44°1′48″N 88°10′6″W
- Area: 4.2 acres (1.7 ha)
- Built: 1913
- Architect: B. Mehner
- Architectural style: Classical Revival
- MPS: County Courthouses of Wisconsin TR
- NRHP reference No.: 82000640
- Added to NRHP: March 9, 1982

The Calumet County Courthouse, built in 1913, is an historic copper-domed county courthouse building located at 206 Court St in Chilton, Wisconsin. Designed by B. Mehner in the Classical Revival style, it was built of red brick.

In 1978, it was added to the National Register of Historic Places.

It is a three-story building with a low center dome. It has a concrete-block ground story and two red brick stories. Inside, it had a three-story rotunda but that was reduced in the 1960s. It was designed by architect Baldwin Mehner of Dorchester, Wisconsin, who soon after designed the Taylor County Courthouse (1913, which was NRHP-listed in 1980). The two courthouses have only minor differences.
