= Day, Wisconsin =

- Town
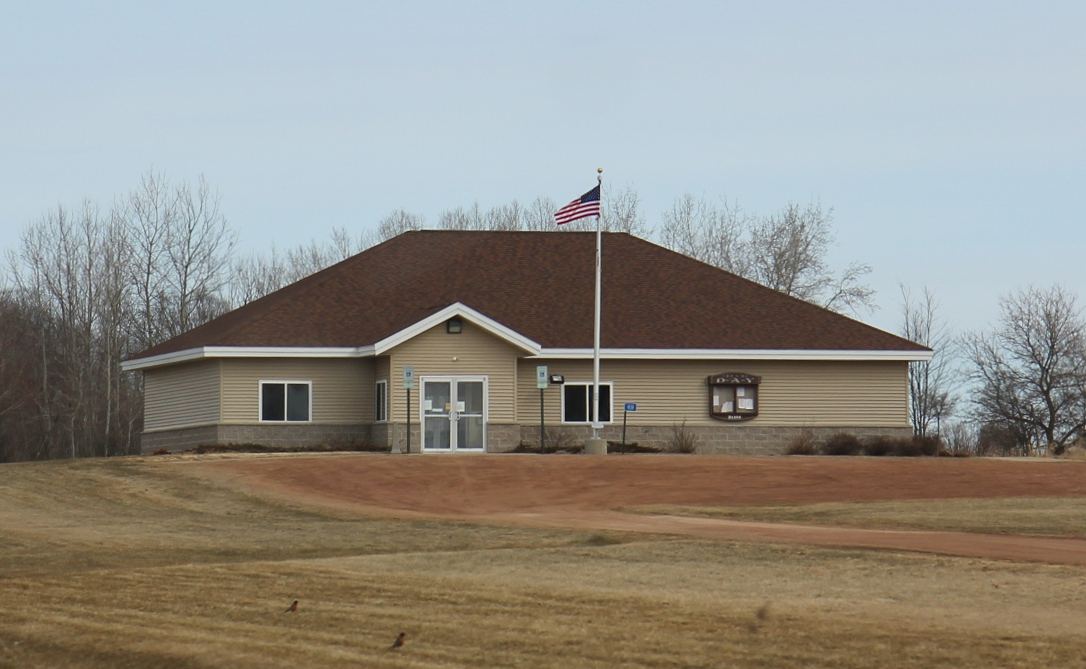
- Town hall by Rozellville

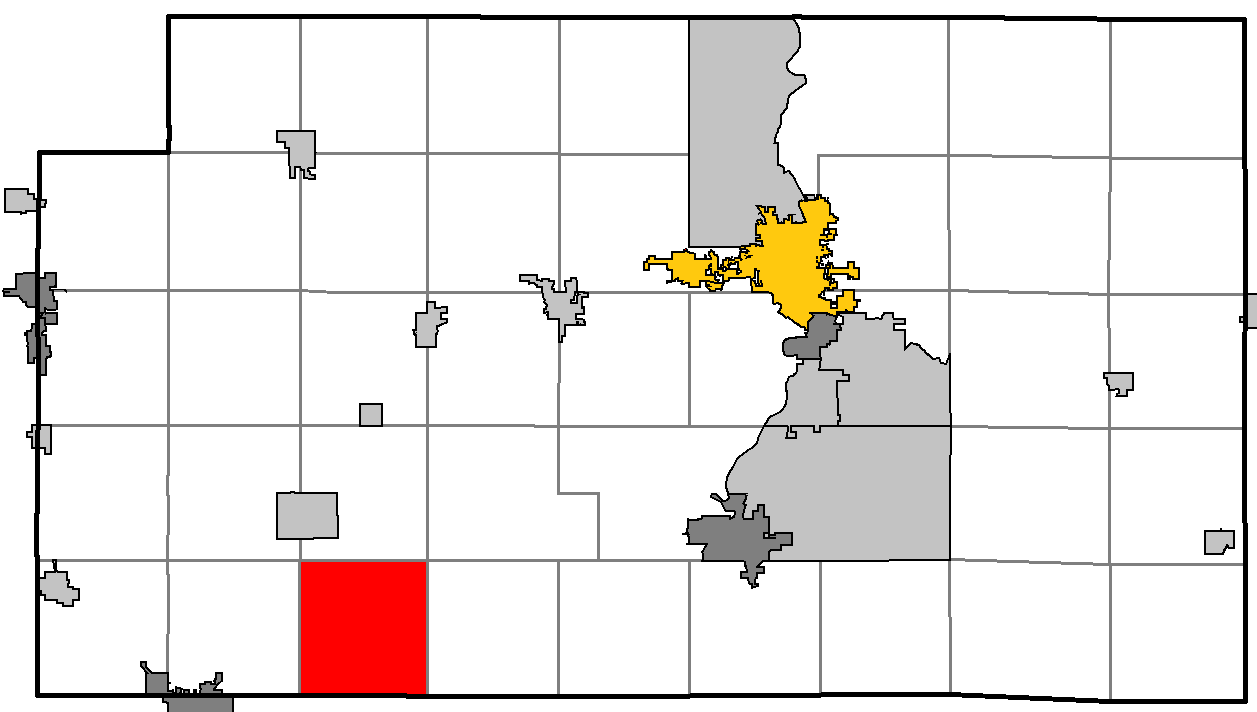
- Location of Day, Marathon County

- Location of Marathon County, Wisconsin
- Coordinates: 44°43′40″N 90°1′43″W
- Country: United States
- State: Wisconsin
- County: Marathon

Area
  - Total: 34.0 sq mi (88.0 km^{2})
  - Land: 33.7 sq mi (87.4 km^{2})
  - Water: 0.23 sq mi (0.6 km^{2})
- Elevation: 1,211 ft (369 m)

Population (2020)
  - Total: 1,063
  - Density: 31.5/sq mi (12.2/km^{2})
- Time zone: UTC-6 (Central (CST))
  - Summer (DST): UTC-5 (CDT)
- Area codes: 715 & 534
- FIPS code: 55-18950
- GNIS feature ID: 1583054
- PLSS township: T26N R4E
- Website: https://townofdaywi.gov/

Day is a town in southwestern Marathon County, Wisconsin, United States. It is part of the Wausau, Wisconsin Metropolitan Statistical Area. The population was 1,063 at the 2020 census. The unincorporated community of Rozellville is located in the town. The unincorporated community of Rangeline is also located partially in the town.

== Geography ==
According to the United States Census Bureau, the town has a total area of 34.0 square miles (88.0 km^{2}), of which 33.7 square miles (87.4 km^{2}) is land and 0.2 square miles (0.6 km^{2}), or 0.71%, is water.

== History ==
The outline of the six-mile square that would become Day was first surveyed in August and September 1851 by a crew working for the U.S. government. Around Christmas of 1852 another crew marked its section corners, walking through the woods and wading the streams, measuring with chain and compass. When done, the deputy surveyor filed this general description:

This Township contains no marshes: There is a Tamarac Swamp in the SouthEast corner unfit for cultivation. The Surface is generally level rather more than half of it is covered with Hardwood timber Where the soil is 1st and 2nd rate. This Township is heavily timbered the low land produces Hemlock(?) Black Ash Tamarac and Birch: the more elevated land produces Sugar-Maple White(?) Elm, Linden(?) Oak, White Ash and Birch with Scattering Hemlock and Pine. The Little O'Plane Enters the Township on Section 19 and runs in a south-Easterly direction to the corner of sections 29, 30, 31 and 32 Thence in an Easterly direction passing out on Section 25. It is a shallow rapid stream not sufficient water for mills. There is very little Pine timber in this Township and no improvements.

== Demographics ==
At the 2000 census there were 1,023 people, 357 households, and 294 families living in the town. The population density was 30.3 people per square mile (11.7/km^{2}). There were 367 housing units at an average density of 10.9 per square mile (4.2/km^{2}). The racial makeup of the town was 98.92% White, 0.10% Asian, and 0.98% from two or more races. Hispanic or Latino of any race were 0.10%.

Of the 357 households 37.0% had children under the age of 18 living with them, 71.1% were married couples living together, 5.6% had a female householder with no husband present, and 17.6% were non-families. 15.1% of households were one person and 8.4% were one person aged 65 or older. The average household size was 2.87 and the average family size was 3.18.

The age distribution was 25.8% under the age of 18, 9.2% from 18 to 24, 29.5% from 25 to 44, 24.6% from 45 to 64, and 10.9% 65 or older. The median age was 36 years. For every 100 females, there were 109.2 males. For every 100 females age 18 and over, there were 110.2 males.

The median household income was $47,500 and the median family income was $50,288. Males had a median income of $30,455 versus $21,417 for females. The per capita income for the town was $17,725. About 3.7% of families and 4.1% of the population were below the poverty line, including 1.9% of those under age 18 and 13.0% of those age 65 or over.

== Notable person ==
- Frank Nikolay, Wisconsin State Representative, was born in the town
