= Medford Free Public Library =

- U.S. National Register of Historic Places
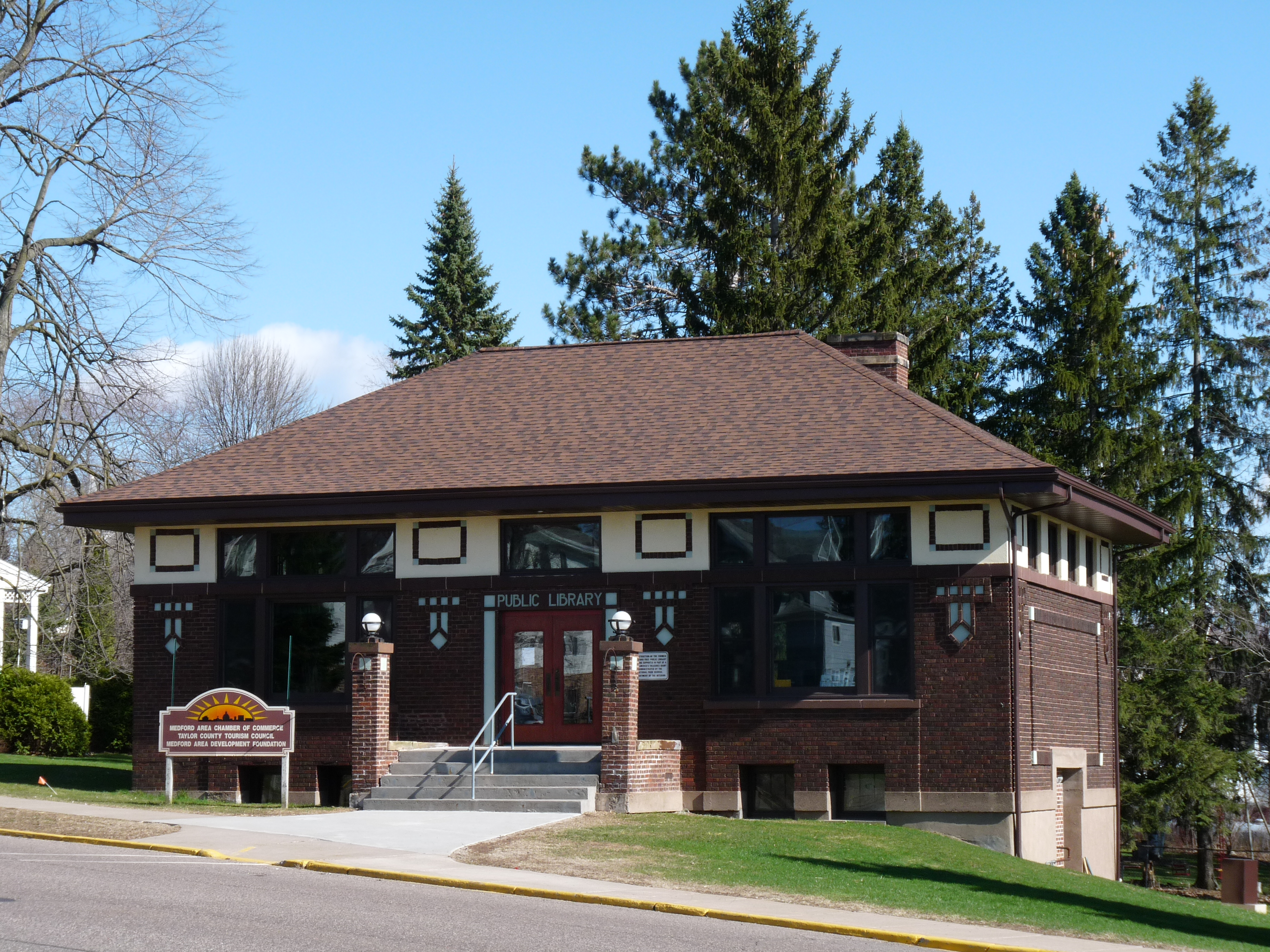
- Medford Free Public Library

- Location within Wisconsin Location within the United States
- Location: 104 E. Perkins St. Medford, Wisconsin
- Coordinates: 45°8′2″N 90°20′30″W
- Built: 1916
- Architect: Hans T. Liebert
- Architectural style: Prairie School
- NRHP reference No.: 93000259
- Added to NRHP: April 1, 1993

The Medford Free Public Library is a Carnegie library in Medford, Wisconsin, built in 1916. It was added to the National Register of Historic Places in 1993.

The first library in Medford was a reading room in Temperance Hall, opened in 1903 and operated by the local chapter of the Woman's Christian Temperance Union and the Medford Women's Club. In 1909 the reading room moved to a larger room in the same building, but it soon outgrew that space, too.

In 1913, the library board applied to the Carnegie Foundation for support in building a free-standing library with more space. The city agreed to give $600 a year to operate the library if the Carnegie Foundation would give $6000 for the new building. Architect Hans Theodore Liebert (1877-1966) of Wausau designed the building and H. A. Giles built it. In 1915 the Medford Woman's Alliance was formed to support the library. February 22, 1917 was the grand opening, with the library holding 2,221 books.

Liebert designed the building in the Prairie School style. Hallmarks of that style present in this building are the emphasis on horizontal lines, the hip roof, the stucco, and the abstract geometric patterns in the frieze.

This building served the community as a library until 1998. By the 1990s needs had again outgrown the space of the building. After debating whether to expand the existing building or construct a new library at a different site, the community decided on the latter. The Simeks gave a large contribution toward a new building, the Frances L. Simek Memorial Library was built, and 20,000 books were moved in late 1998. Since the library moved, the local Chamber of Commerce has taken up residence in the 1916 building.

== See also ==
- National Register of Historic Places listings in Taylor County, Wisconsin
