= Medford Post Office =

- U.S. National Register of Historic Places
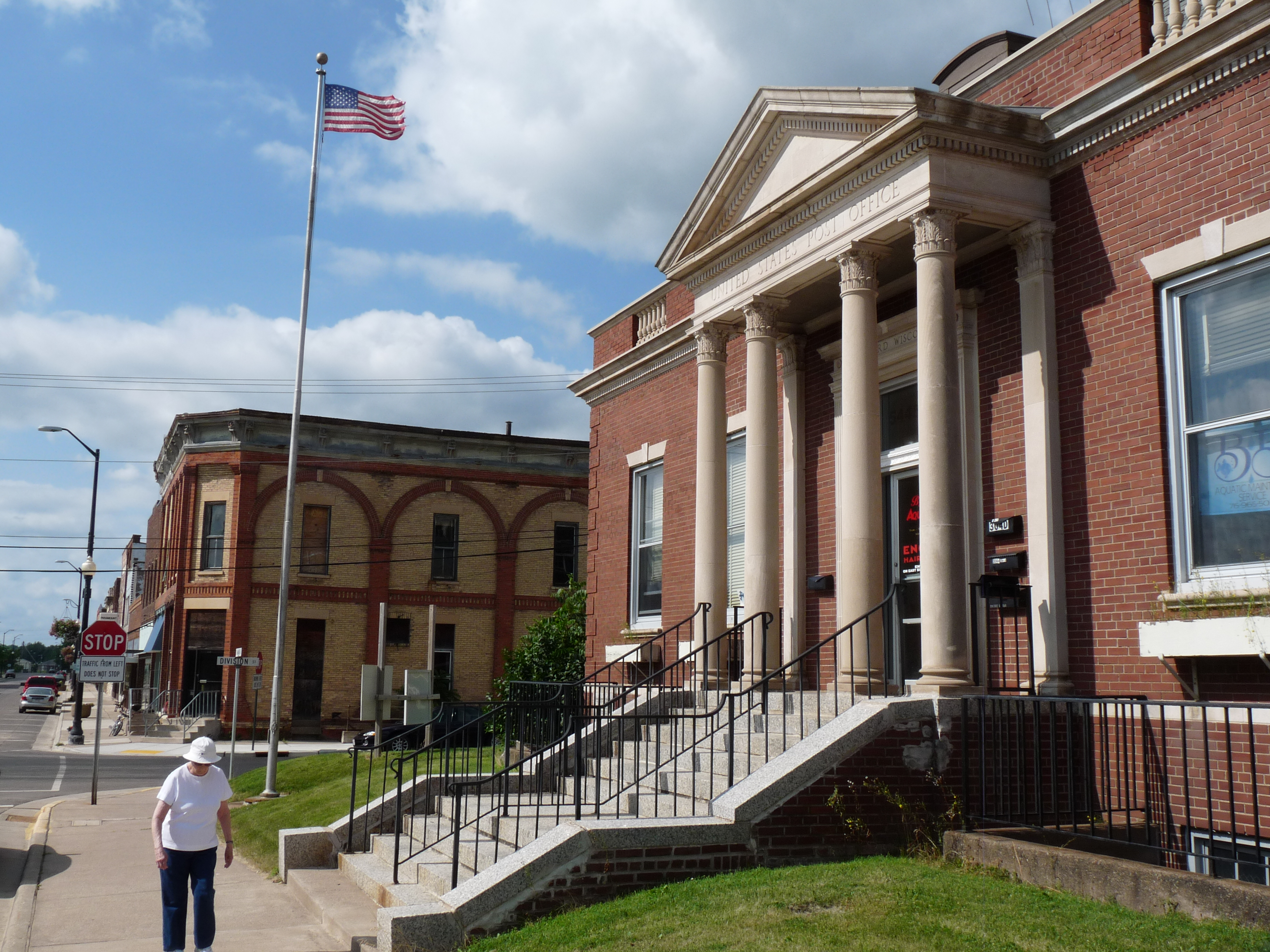
- Medford Post Office

- Location within Wisconsin Location within the United States
- Interactive map showing the location of Medford Post Office
- Location: 304 S. Main St. Medford, Wisconsin
- Coordinates: 45.13629°N 90.34344°W
- Architect: Neal A. Melick/Louis A. Simon
- Architectural style: Georgian Revival
- NRHP reference No.: 00001244
- Added to NRHP: October 24, 2000

The 1937 Medford Post Office is located in downtown Medford, Wisconsin. It was added to the National Register of Historic Places in 2000.

Until 1937, Medford's post office was housed in the J. W. Benn Building, just up the street. Benn was appointed Medford's postmaster in 1909, and moved the post office to his own private commercial building. His term ended in 1913, when the new president appointed a new postmaster, but the post office remained in his building for years, through subsequent postmasters. By the 1930s there was a general move to get post offices into dedicated public buildings.

In Medford the Postal Service constructed this building in 1937, with help from the Works Progress Administration. The main block is red brick, trimmed in limestone, with brick quoins on the corners. The front entrance is a classical portico, like a shallow Greek temple with simple columns decorated with acanthus leaves supporting a pediment that says UNITED STATES POST OFFICE. At the top of the exterior wall is a parapet and above that limestone balusters. The roof behind is hipped, broken by dormers. Inside are the original the terrazzo floor, marble wainscot, wood trim and doors. Some doors and fixtures have been replaced.

== See also ==
- National Register of Historic Places listings in Taylor County, Wisconsin
