= Rangeline, Wisconsin =

- Unincorporated community
- Location within Wisconsin Location within the United States
- Coordinates: 44°44′37″N 89°57′50″W
- Country: United States
- State: Wisconsin
- County: Marathon
- Elevation: 1,201 ft (366 m)
- Time zone: UTC-6 (Central (CST))
  - Summer (DST): UTC-5 (CDT)
- Area codes: 715 and 534
- GNIS feature ID: 1572074

Rangeline is an unincorporated community located in the towns of Day and Green Valley, Marathon County, Wisconsin, United States. It is located along County Road C, approximately six miles east of State Highway 97, or three miles east of Rozellville.
