= Powers Bluff =

- U.S. National Register of Historic Places
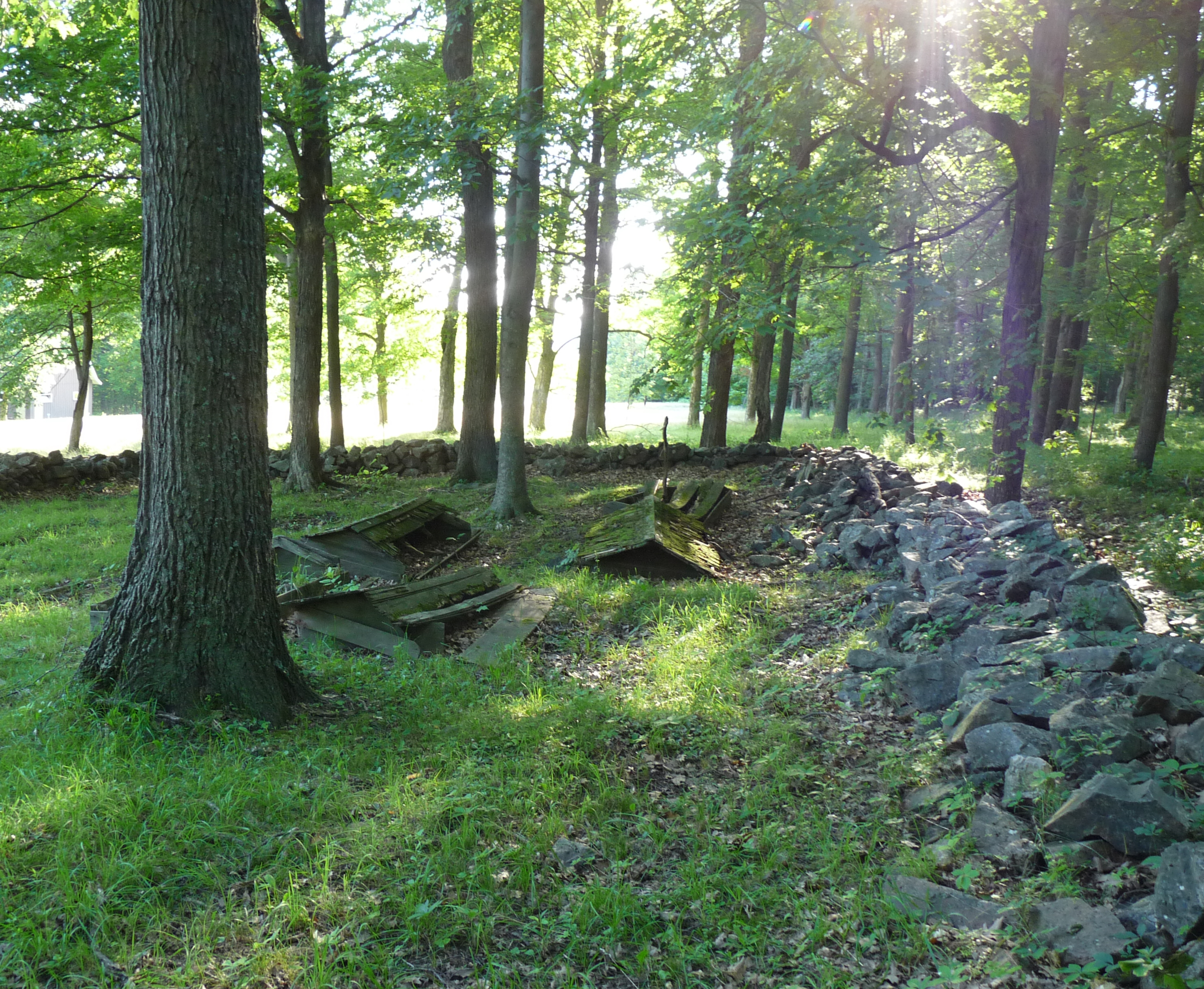
- Location: Arpin, Wisconsin
- NRHP reference No.: 02000732
- Added to NRHP: July 5, 2002

Powers Bluff is a wooded hill in central Wisconsin near Arpin. American Indians lived there until the 1930s, calling it Tah-qua-kik, or Skunk Hill. Because of their religious and ceremonial activities, Tah-qua-kik is listed on the National Register of Historic Places.

Today part of the hill is occupied by Powers Bluff County Park, locally known for its inner-tube hill on winter weekends. At 1472 feet above sea level, it is the highest point in Wood County.

== Natural history ==
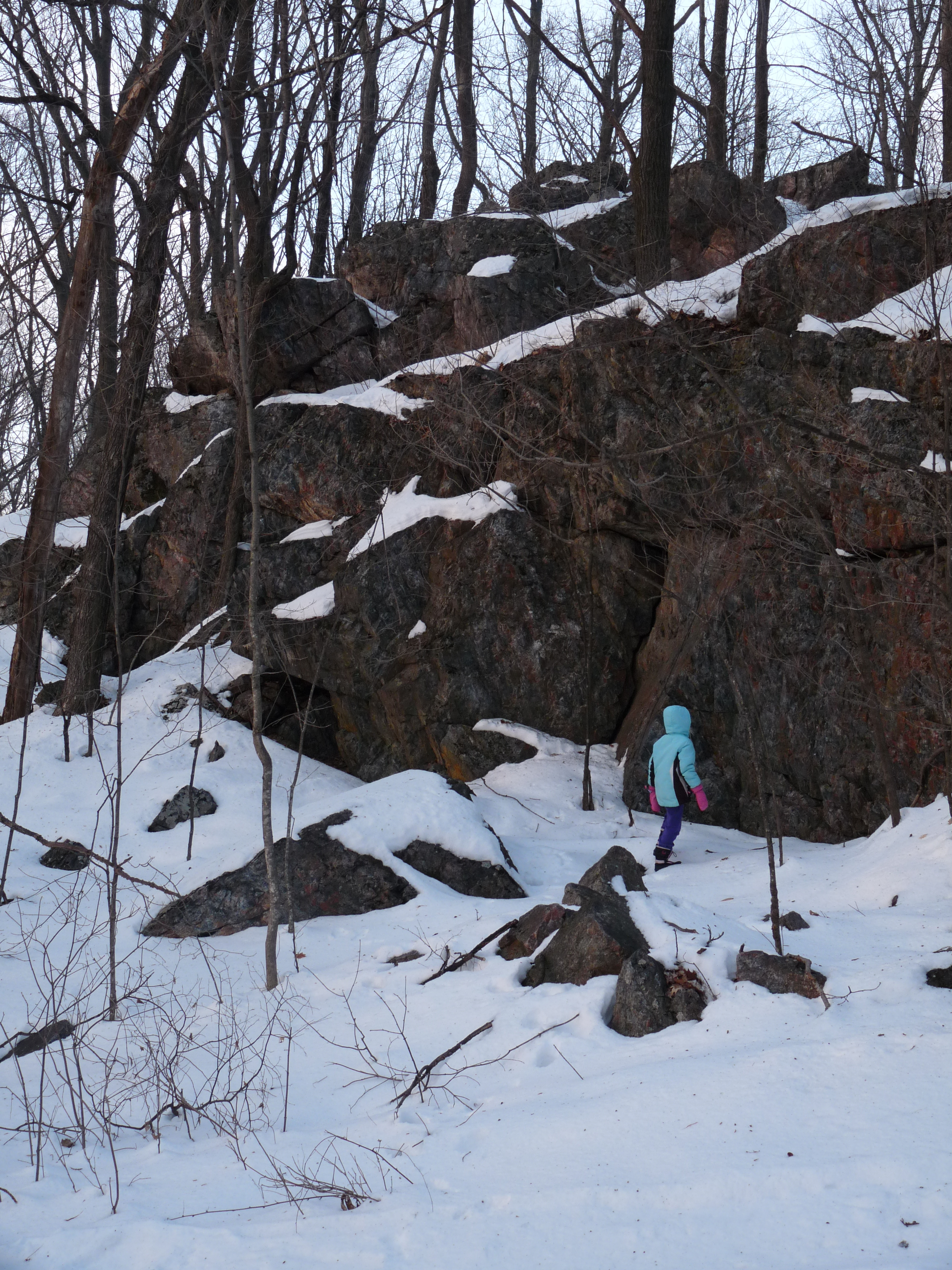
Quartzite outcrops like this run along the crest of the bluff, generally WNW to ESE.

The most striking geological feature at Powers Bluff is the stone outcrops poking out the top of the hill. In some places they rise 25 feet above the forest floor. The bluff is quartzite with a peak of chert. Geologists believe the quartzite to be from the Proterozoic era, 1.6 billion years old, similar in age and composition to Rib Mountain to the northeast and the Baraboo Hills to the south, and much older than the Himalayas. The quartzite is pretty pink, a semi-precious stone, and very hard. The softer materials which once surrounded it have been gradually stripped away by erosion, leaving the bluff.

Boulders and pebbles of the unusual chert from Powers Bluff are concentrated in a fan shape with its point at Powers Bluff and spreading to the southeast for 20 km, almost to the west side of Rapids. This indicates that a glacier once moved over the bluff heading southeast, breaking off stones and carrying them for miles.

Most of the bluff is covered by mesic forest dominated by sugar maples - some very old and large. Beneath the trees, spring wildflowers begin to bloom around the second week of April, with mayflowers and Dutchman's breeches plentiful, and some spring beauties, trout lilies, and wild oats eventually giving way to trilliums. During summer, ferns and blue cohosh grow in the shade. The maples turn red and yellow around the start of October, and soon the forest floor is blanketed in leaves.

Gray squirrels, chipmunks, and white-tailed deer are commonly seen on the bluff.

== Human history ==
East of the bluff are five large man-made mounds two to three feet high and twenty-five to thirty feet in diameter. These mounds show that the bluff was visited by American Indians before recorded times, though their identity is unknown.

Potawatomis under a spiritual leader named John Young probably settled briefly at Powers Bluff in the 1870s or 1880s. Since the Indian Removal Act of 1830, these people had been kicked around. Some were moved to reservations in Kansas, then drifted back. Other "stray bands" had stayed in Wisconsin. They called their settlement at Powers Bluff Tah-qua-kik. Tah-qua-kik was not an Indian reservation managed by the U.S. government, so the people here were less influenced by Indian schools and overt efforts to Americanize them. Communities like this were important for preserving native culture.

At this time, the bluff was a secluded refuge poking up out of the forest - not hemmed in by farms and roads as it is today. But Europeans were coming into the area. In 1871 the Wisconsin Central Railway pushed its line through the woods seven miles to the north. Young and most of his people probably stayed only briefly, then moved fifteen miles north to Indian Farms near Rozellville and eventually Perkinstown, McCord, and Forest County.

The John Arpin Logging Company cut the timber on the bluff in the 1890s. The lumber operation closed in 1904.

Shortly after the logging finished, more Potawatomi from Kansas returned. In 1905 or 1906, their homes were described in an article in a local newspaper:

...In the silent, somnolent forest they formed their round bark houses, as the Hebrew of old constructed the beautiful temple 'so that there was neither hammer nor ax nor any tool of iron heard while it was building.' A frame work of poles and branches was made and bound together. Then this frame work was entirely covered with large pieces of bark, firmly held in place by the tough, pliable, rope-like strips of dogwood bark.... Around the inner wall of this house is a platform 30 inches high and seven and eight feet wide. This is used for a lounging place by day and a bed by night. Their blankets were neatly folded up against the wall. In the center was an open place with a dirty floor and a pile of ashes where they had cooked their meals on rainy days. On the bough rafters were hung roots of various kinds....

The heart of the community was at the top of the bluff, on the warm south side of the rock outcrops. Other homes were scattered below on the south slope. The Medicine Society was housed in a canvas-covered longhouse and there was a building for the drums.

A smattering of other people settled with the Potawatomi at Tah-qua-kik, including some Chippewa, Ho-Chunk, Kickapoo, and later Menominee. The 1910 census tallied 100 Indians in 21 households in Arpin township led by a Ho-Chunk man named White Pigeon and a Potawatomi named John Nuwi.

In spring the people made maple sugar, to use and for trade. They supported themselves by hunting, gathering, gardening, trapping, working at local farms, and selling crafts.

The dance rings at that time did not have spruce trees growing on them. Instead, a wood rail circled each. These dances were held several times a year, drawing hundreds of visitors from around Wisconsin and as far as Kansas, some riding the train into Arpin. Some visitors were from other tribes and some were non-Indian neighbors. Ceremonies ran for several days, with traditional costumes, drumming, dancing, and speaking. There was a thanksgiving dance in May, a religion or thanksgiving dance in July, and a harvest dance in late summer/early fall. A Medicine Lodge dance was held at various times.

As years passed, some of the homes at Tah-qua-kik became more like those of neighbors in nearby Arpin - log cabins and frame houses. Some families cooked on iron stoves, lit their homes with kerosene lanterns, and ate from ceramic dishes. By 1930, the population had declined and the village center at the top of the hill was abandoned.

In 1936 the town of Arpin gave the land at the top of the bluff to Wood County, which developed it as a park. The ski runs on the north side of the bluff opened in 1948 and the warming house in 1950.

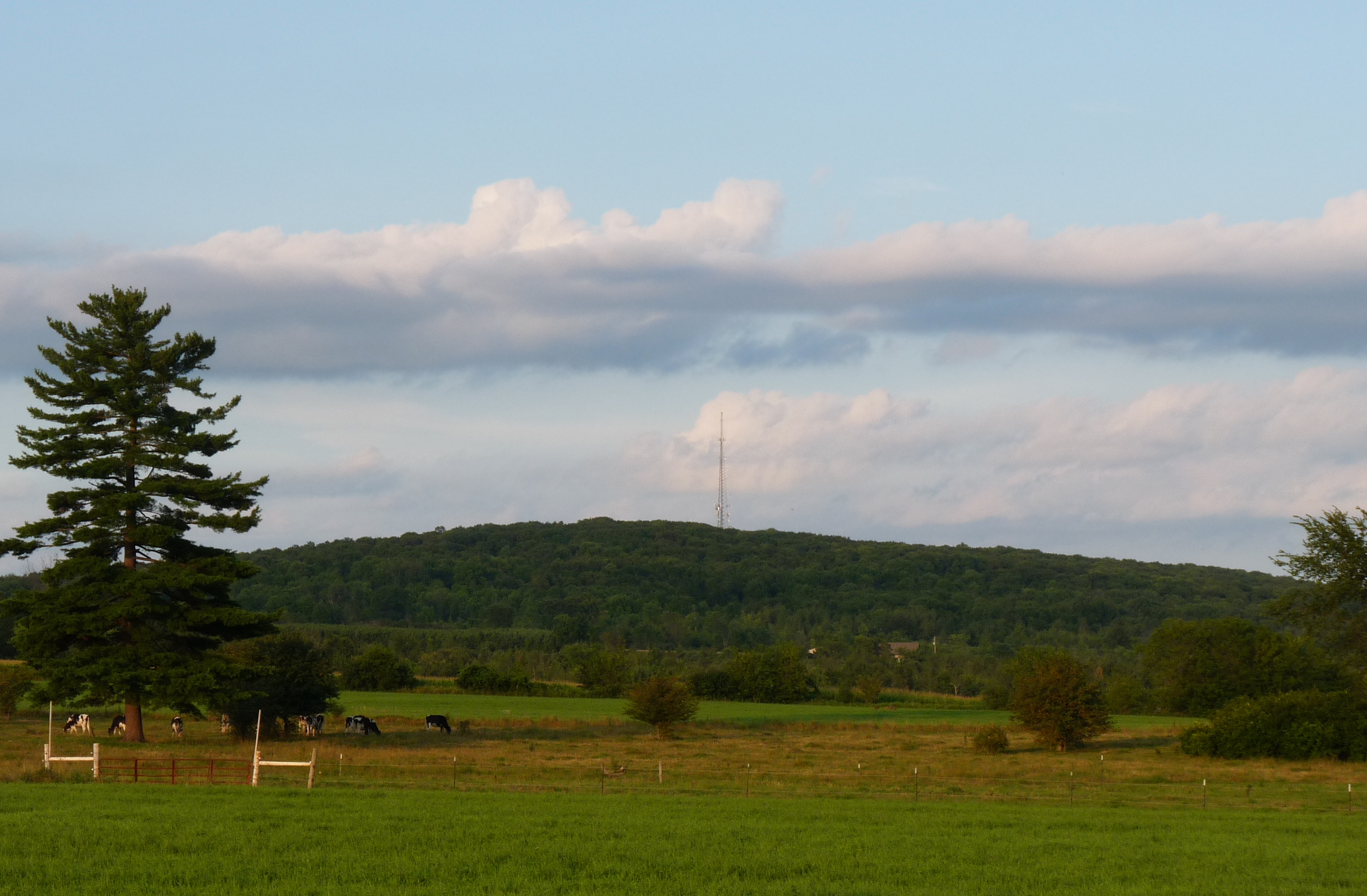
View from the west

In 1999 the county planned to expand the ski hill, but Indians objected that it would mean cutting grave marker trees and disturbing burials. In 2012 Wood County added 223 acres to the north side of the park. With that, in 2023 a new plan is being implemented, adding 4.5 miles of mountain bike trails and a new entrance from the north to take pressure off the hilltop, where the village was.

== Powers Bluff County Park ==
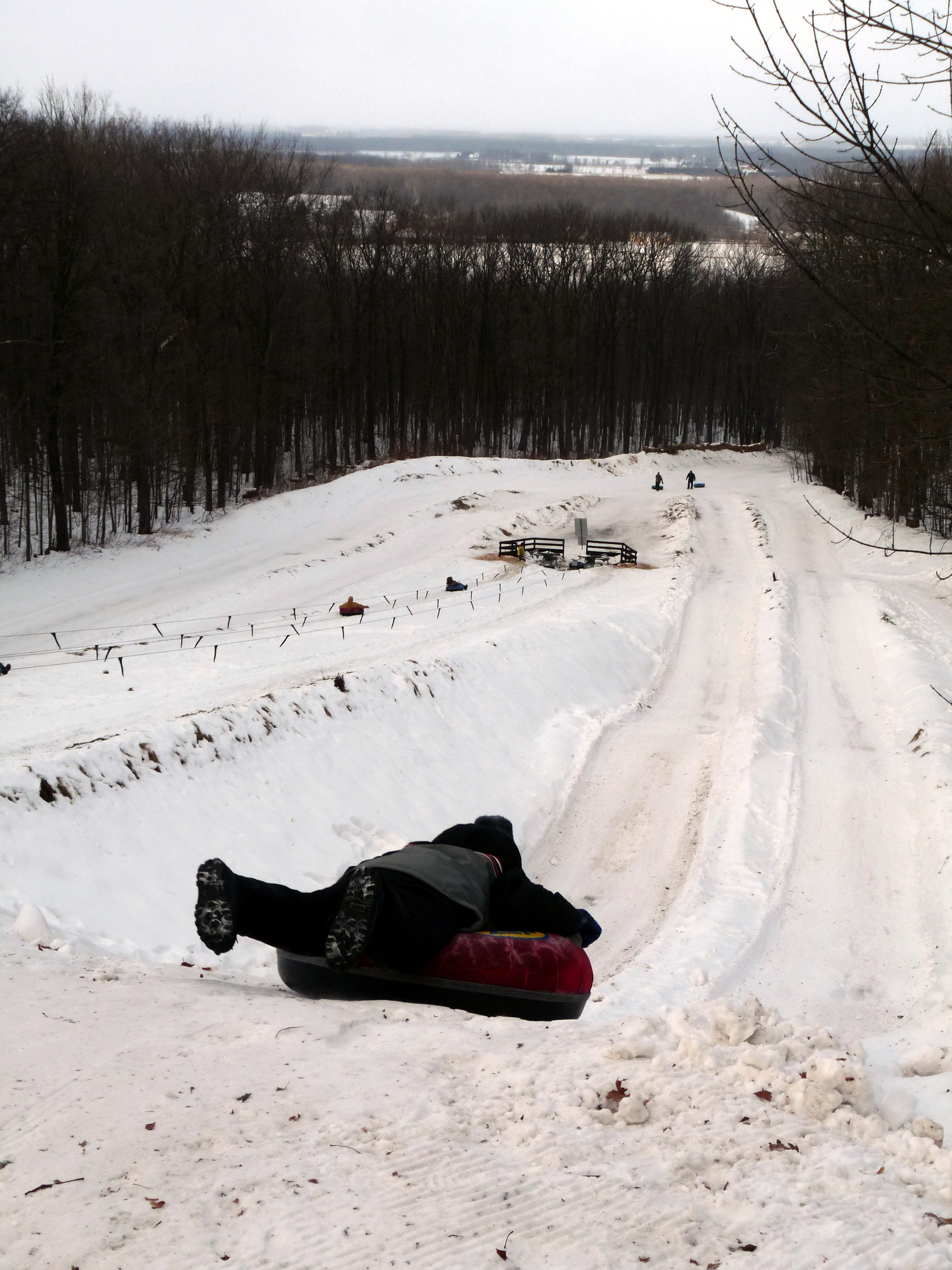
Inner-tubing on the north side of the bluff, on New Year's Day.

Powers Bluff County Park was established in 1936 from land given to the county. The park offers inner-tubing and downhill skiing with tows and a warming house on weekends, and cross-country skiing during the winter season.

Seventy acres to the east of the park is a state Natural Area called Powers Bluff Maple Woods.

The park occupies an area across the top of the bluff. Parts of the bluff outside the park are privately owned, used for homes and farming.
