= Greenwood, Taylor County, Wisconsin =

Greenwood, Wisconsin
- Town
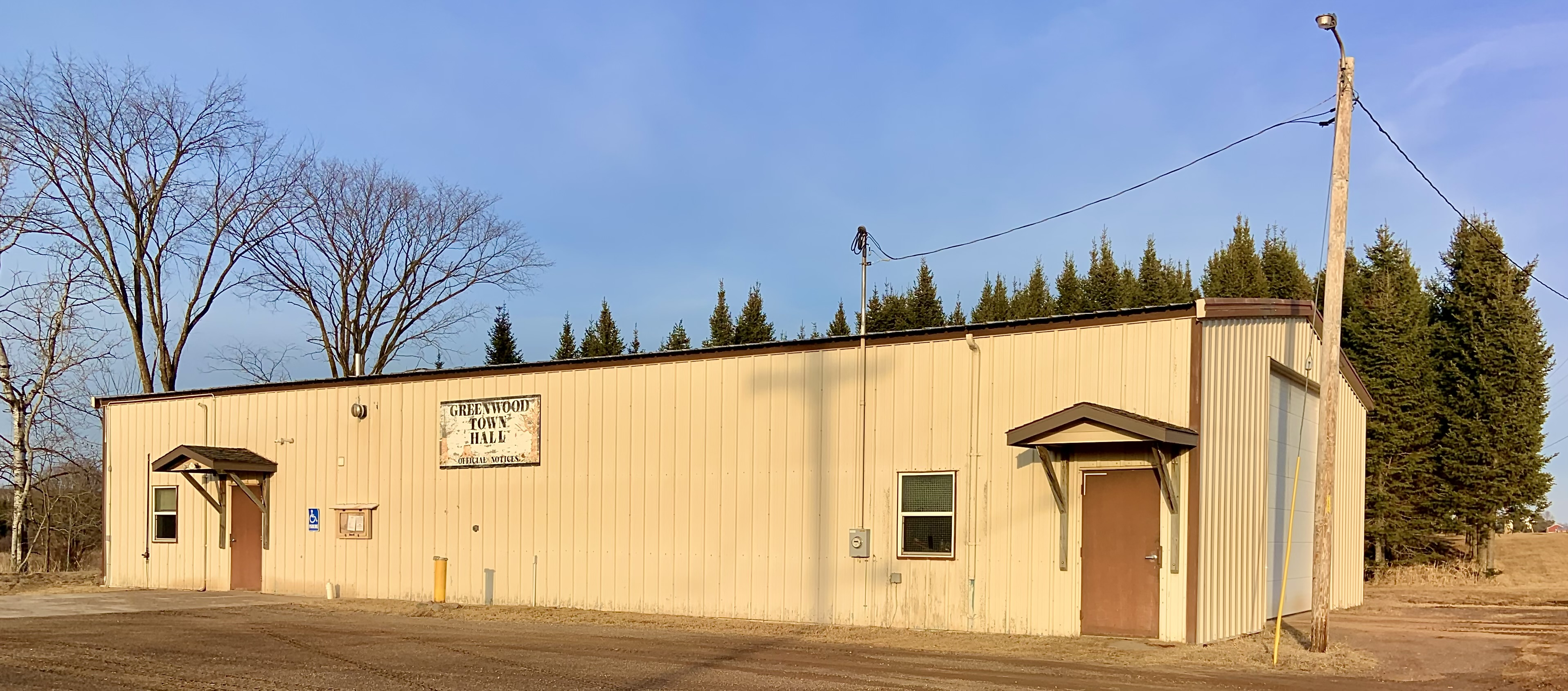
- Town hall

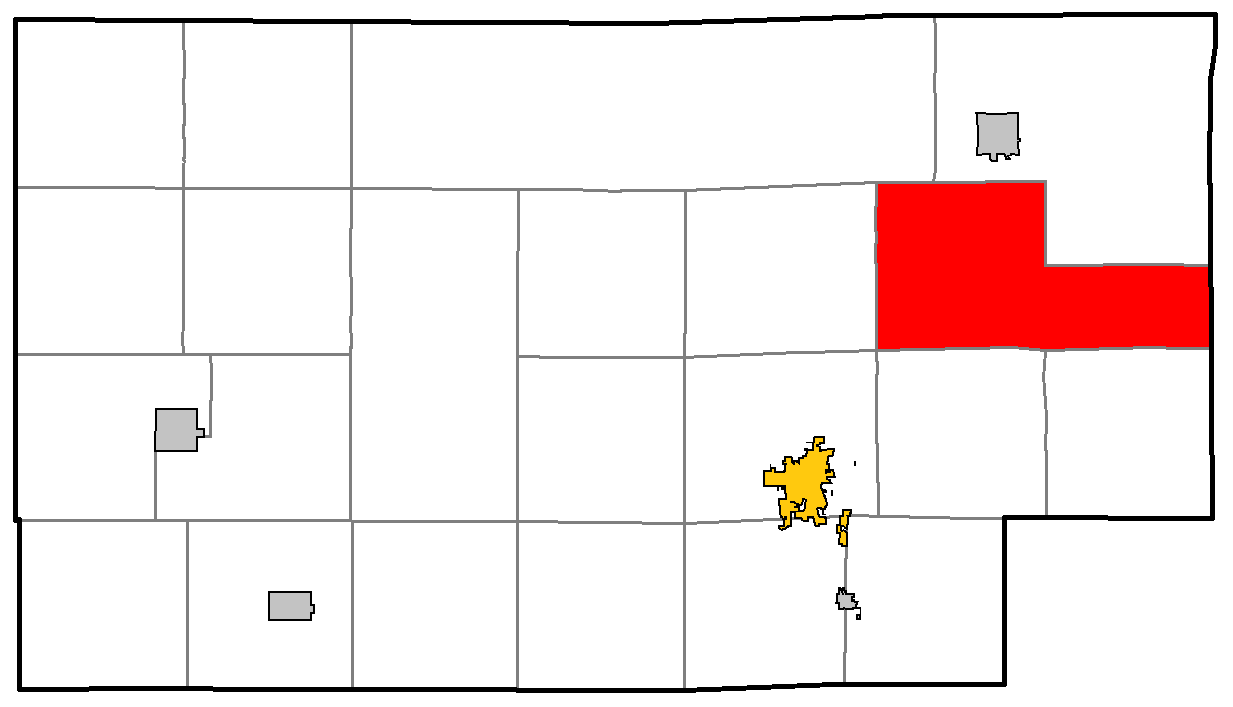
- Location of Greenwood, within Taylor County

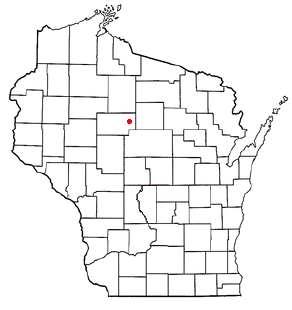
- Location of Greenwood, Taylor County, Wisconsin
- Coordinates: 45°14′40″N 90°10′42″W
- Country: United States
- State: Wisconsin
- County: Taylor

Area
  - Total: 54.3 sq mi (140.7 km^{2})
  - Land: 54.3 sq mi (140.6 km^{2})
  - Water: 0.039 sq mi (0.1 km^{2})
- Elevation: 1,519 ft (463 m)

Population (2020)
  - Total: 621
  - Density: 11.4/sq mi (4.42/km^{2})
- Time zone: UTC-6 (Central (CST))
  - Summer (DST): UTC-5 (CDT)
- Area codes: 715 & 534
- FIPS code: 55-31600
- GNIS feature ID: 1583324
- PLSS township: T32N R2E and southern half of T32N R3E
- Website: https://www.townshipofgreenwood.com/

Greenwood is a town in Taylor County, Wisconsin, United States. The population was 621 at the 2020 census. The unincorporated community of Interwald is located in the town.

== Geography ==
According to the United States Census Bureau, the town has a total area of 54.3 square miles (140.7 km^{2}), of which 54.3 square miles (140.6 km^{2}) is land and 0.1 square mile (0.1 km^{2}) (0.09%) is water. The Big Rib River crosses the eastern end of the town.

Other than stream valleys, the eastern and middle sections of the town roll gently, laid down by some unknown glacier and eroded long before the last glacier. The soil of these areas is called Merrill till, except for meltwater stream sediment along the Big Rib River. The western end is the terminal moraine of that last glacier, with choppy glacial sediment interrupted by the sandy bottoms left by ice-walled lakes.

== History ==
Most of the edges of the six by six squares that would become Greenwood were surveyed in October 1861 by a crew working for the U.S. government. In early 1862, the same crew marked all the section corners in the township, walking through the woods and swamps, measuring with chain and compass. When done, the deputy surveyor filed this general description for the western six by six square:

The surface of this Township is level and the soil good - well adapted for agricultural purposes. The Timber is large, among which is scattering White Pine of a Superior quality.

Around 1873, the Wisconsin Central Railroad built its line just west of what would become Greenwood, up through the forest that would become Medford heading for Ashland. To finance this undertaking, the railroad was granted half the land for eighteen miles on either side of the track laid - generally the odd-numbered sections.

An 1880 map of the area shows no roads in what would become Greenwood. It shows two wagon roads touching the southwest corner, and a road following the course of modern Highway 13 a half mile west of Greenwood.

When Taylor County was formed in 1875, the land that would become Greenwood was part of a larger Town of Chelsea, which spanned the county east to west. In 1895 Greenwood was split off as its own town.

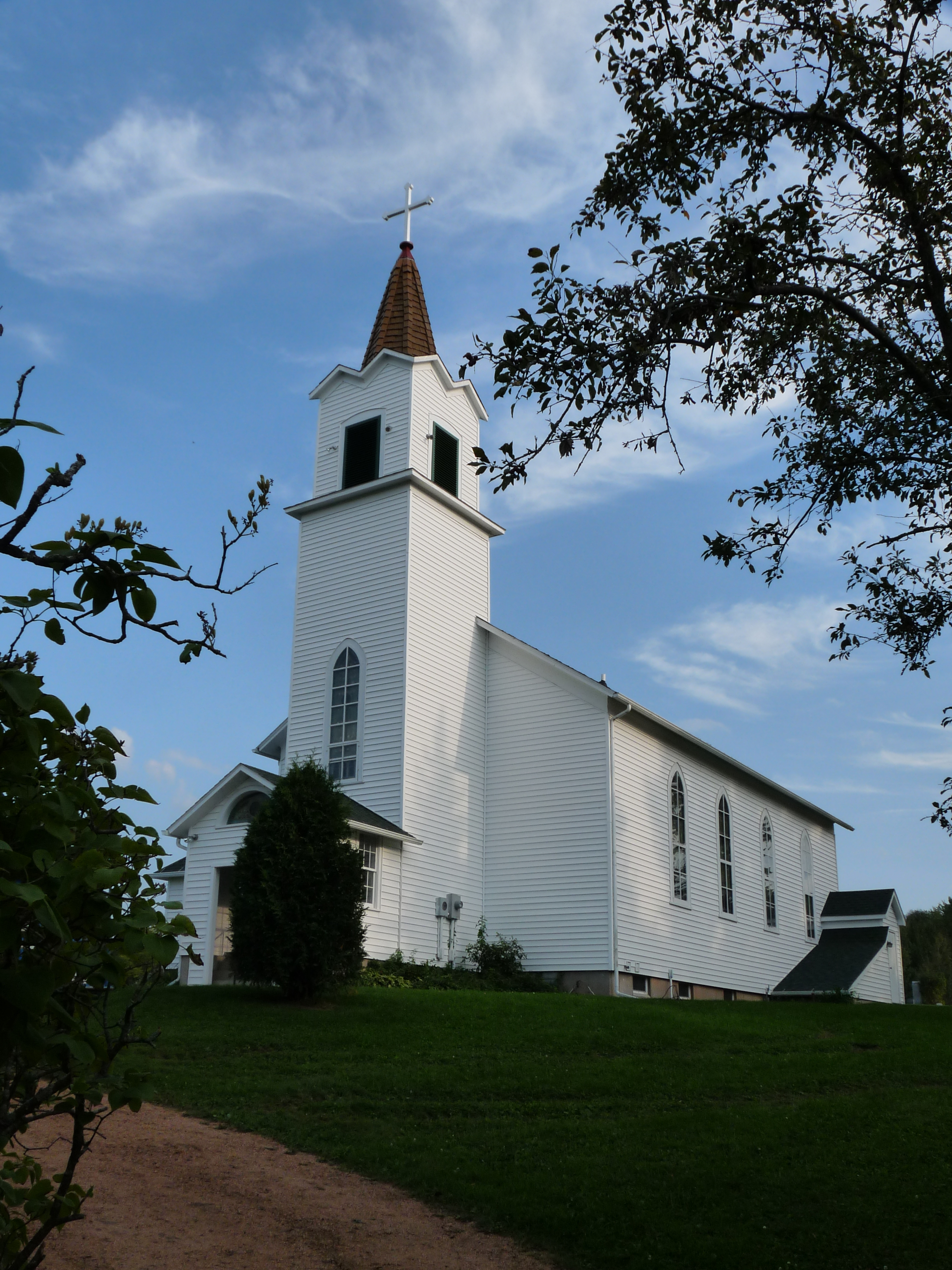
St Anne's was once part of a rural crossroads community. Now the church and cemetery are on the National Register of Historic Places.

A map from around 1900 shows some roads and settlers in place. By that time some sort of road followed the course of modern County M for 12 miles across the township. Another road followed modern Wellington Lake Road north and south. Others followed modern Brehm Avenue, Trout Avenue, and County C. Settlers' homesteads were sprinkled along all these roads. The map also shows two sawmills and four rural schools on the future County M, Urquhart Post Office at the west end, and Interwald Post Office toward the east. Another school was where the predecessor of County C crossed the Rib River, and another school and church on Brehm Avenue, where St. Ann's church still stands. The remainder of the land was still mostly in large blocks, with the Wisconsin Central Railroad still holding many of the odd-numbered sections. The next largest land-owner is J.J. Kennedy, owner of the sawmill at Rib Lake.

The 1911 plat map showed the roads extended, with more settlers along them. The school at C and the Rib River had become the town hall. A Brehm Post Office had appeared on the future Trout Avenue. By this time, the Wisconsin Central had sold most of its land. The surviving large blocks are distributed between various owners, including U.S. Leather, Medford Manufacturing Co., and Wausau Lumber Co. on the east end. Two years later, on a 1913 plat map, Brehm Post Office is shown in a different location, across from St Ann's church.

== Demographics ==
As of the census of 2000, there were 642 people, 234 households, and 186 families residing in the town. The population density was 11.8 people per square mile (4.6/km^{2}). There were 295 housing units at an average density of 5.4 per square mile (2.1/km^{2}). The racial makeup of the town was 98.60% White, 0.16% Native American, 0.16% Asian, 0.31% from other races, and 0.78% from two or more races. Hispanic or Latino of any race were 0.62% of the population.

There were 234 households, out of which 33.3% had children under the age of 18 living with them, 71.4% were married couples living together, 2.6% had a female householder with no husband present, and 20.1% were non-families. 17.5% of all households were made up of individuals, and 6.8% had someone living alone who was 65 years of age or older. The average household size was 2.74 and the average family size was 3.12.

In the town, the population was spread out, with 26.3% under the age of 18, 6.5% from 18 to 24, 28.8% from 25 to 44, 24.3% from 45 to 64, and 14.0% who were 65 years of age or older. The median age was 38 years. For every 100 females, there were 115.4 males. For every 100 females age 18 and over, there were 112.1 males.

The median income for a household in the town was $34,000, and the median income for a family was $42,500. Males had a median income of $27,321 versus $21,528 for females. The per capita income for the town was $14,120. About 10.2% of families and 12.7% of the population were below the poverty line, including 14.2% of those under age 18 and 16.3% of those age 65 or over.
