= Rozellville, Wisconsin =

- Unincorporated community
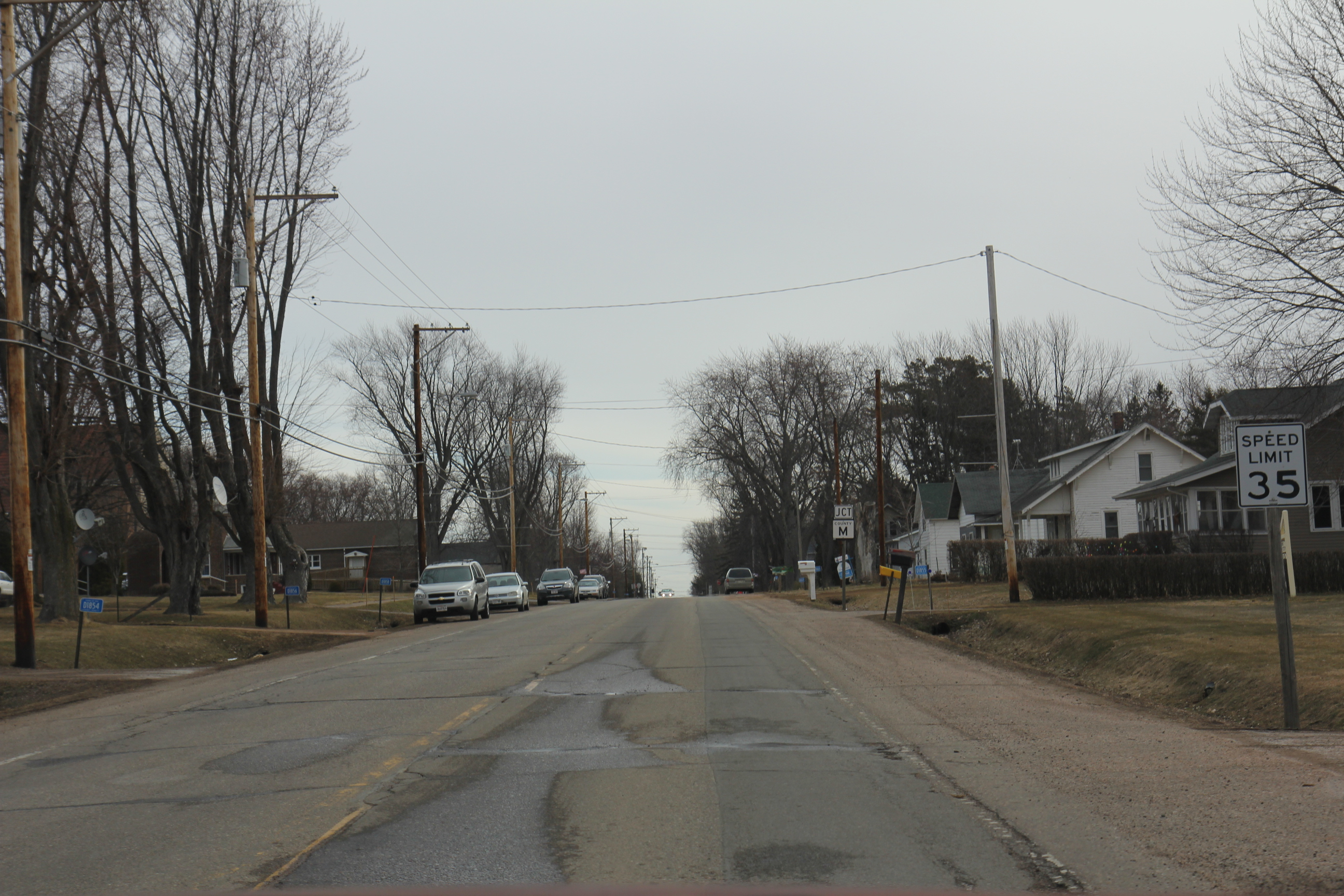
- Looking east at Rozellville on County C

- Location within Wisconsin Location within the United States
- Coordinates: 44°44′36″N 90°01′28″W
- Country: United States
- State: Wisconsin
- County: Marathon
- Elevation: 1,260 ft (380 m)
- Time zone: UTC-6 (Central (CST))
  - Summer (DST): UTC-5 (CDT)
- Area codes: 715 & 534
- GNIS feature ID: 1572702

Rozellville is an unincorporated community located in the town of Day, Marathon County, Wisconsin, United States, at the intersection of County Road M and County Road C, approximately three miles east of State Highway 97.

== Images ==
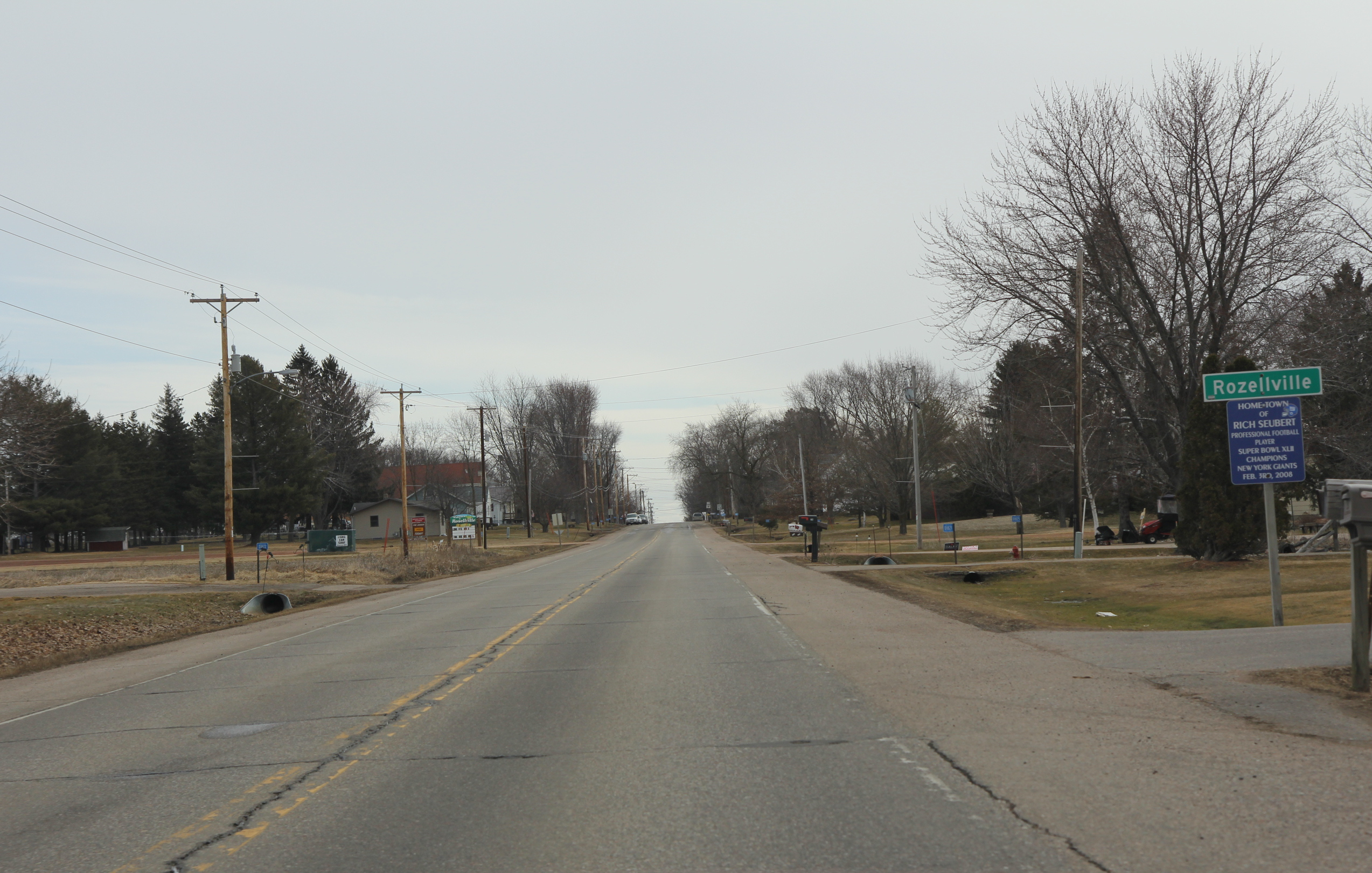
Looking east at the Rozellville sign on County C

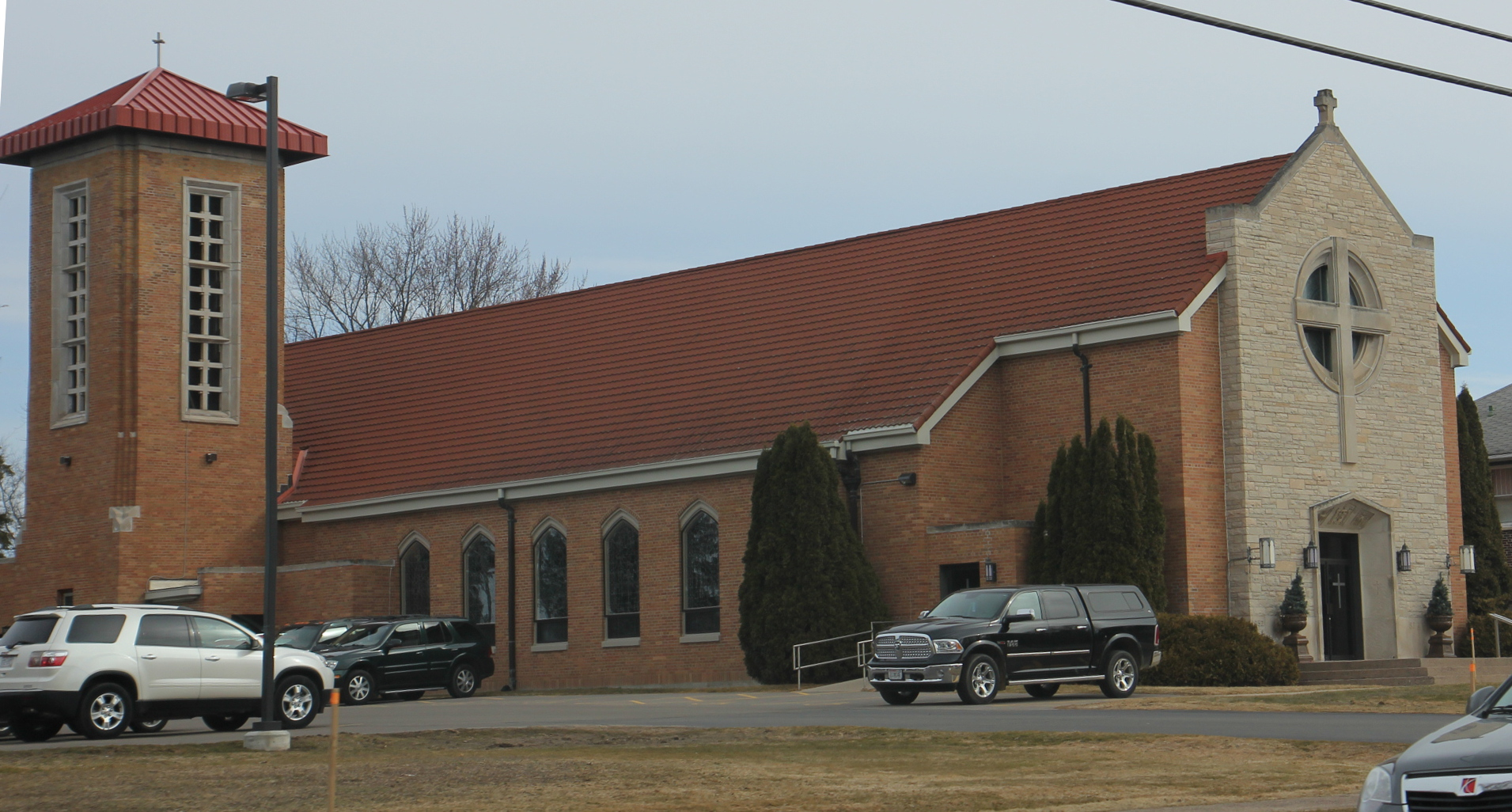
St. Andrew Catholic Church
